= Manharter =

Religious sect in Tyrol

Manharter was a politico-religious sect which arose in Tyrol in the first half of the nineteenth century.

== History ==
=== Founding ===
The founder of Manharter was a Roman Catholic priest, Kaspar Benedict Hagleitner of Aschau, who was the only one of the clergymen of Brixental to refuse to take the oath of allegiance prescribed by Napoleon's edict of 30 May 1809, for the ecclesiastical and secular authorities of the province of Salzburg, of which Brixenthal was then a part. His notion was that priests who took this oath were by that act excommunicated jointly with Napoleon. It was not long before zealous supporters rallied to him from among Austrian sympathizers and patriots in the Brixenthal villages of Westendorf, Brixen im Thale, Hopfgarten, Itter, and from Unter-Innthal, principally in the villages of Wörgl and Kirchbichl. There were two laymen also with Hagleitner at the head of this movement, Thomas Mair, a tanner, and Hagleitner's brother-in-law, and Sebastian Manzl, the parish magistrate of Westendorf. The latter was surnamed Manhart after his estate, the "Untermanhartsgut", and it was from him that the sect derived its name. Hagleitner himself lost his cure, and in 1811 went to Vienna, where he was appointed curate in Wiener-Neustadt. He kept in touch however with his partisans in Brixenthal, and on Tyrol being restored to Austrian rule, he was given once more a cure in Wörgl in November, 1814. But new intrigues again resulted in his removal the following summer. He thenceforth lived a private life in and around Innsbruck until the summer of 1818, when he was ordered by the Government to repair to Vienna. He was named Kaplan shortly after in Kalksburg near Vienna, and died there as parish priest in 1836.

=== Schism ===
The schism reached its full development at Easter, 1815, when for the first time Manzl and his household refused to receive the sacraments from the vicar of his home parish of Westendorf. Thenceforth Hagleitner was looked upon by the Manharter as the only priest of that region who "had the power" to confess and to administer Holy Communion. As a rule they no longer attended public Catholic worship, but held independent reunions of their own. They refused even to receive the Last Sacraments. Thus the Manharter first of all cut themselves off from their priests, because they considered them to have been excommunicated. They went further and proclaimed that the majority of French and German bishops and priests, as supporters of Napoleon in the established Church, had severed themselves from the supreme pontiff, and therefore from the Catholic Church itself. Consequently, they were now devoid of sacerdotal powers; all of their ecclesiastical functions were null and void; they could neither consecrate nor absolve validly. The Manharter thus believed themselves to be the only genuine Catholics in the land, and they professed to be true adherents of the pope. As strictly conservative champions of traditional custom, they protested likewise against a series of innovations which had been introduced into the Austrian Church, against the abolition of indulgences and pilgrimages, the abrogation of feast-days, the abolition of the Saturday fast, and the mitigation of that prescribed for the forty days of Lent. They likewise opposed textbooks recently brought into the schools, which were not Christian in tone, and finally they combated the vaccination of children, as an offence against faith, and for this additional reason reproached the clergy with countenancing and supporting this state regulation. A spell of apocalyptic extravagance took hold of the Manharter about this period, when they united with the so-called "Michael Confraternity", or the Order of the Knights of Michael. This was a fanatical secret society founded in Carinthia by the visionary Agnes Wirsinger and by a priest, Johann Holzer of Gmünd. Its adherents awaited the impending destruction of the wicked by the Archangel Gabriel, at which time they, the undefiled, were to be spared and to receive the earth in heritage. The heads of the Manharter began their relations with this society in the autumn of 1815, and in 1817 Hagleitner secured their formal admittance into it. One phase of this society's apocalyptic expectations led its members to regard Napoleon as Antichrist already come upon the earth.

=== Attempts at reconciliation ===
The administrator of the Archdiocese of Salzburg, Leopold Maximilian von Firmian, tried unsuccessfully on his pastoral visitations during the summer of 1819 to convince the Manharter that they were in error. The latter questioned the genuineness of his episcopal character and refused to hear anyone but the pope. Bernhard Galura, spiritual counsellor to the Government, could not persuade them either. Even punishments inflicted by the civil authorities for the holding of secret reunions and for continued disobedience did not succeed. The Manharter persisted in their request that they be permitted to send a deputation to Rome to obtain a decision from the pope in person, but this the Government refused to allow. Augustin Johann Joseph Gruber, the archbishop of Salzburg, was eventually able to convince most of them to reconcile with Rome. His endeavours in the course of a pastoral tour made through Brixenthal in 1824, and his appeals to them in a pastoral letter of 25 May 1825, failed, but he obtained their promise to believe in and to obey him, provided the pope himself should declare that he was their lawful bishop. Archbishop Gruber then secured leave from the emperor for Manzl, Mair, and Simon Laiminger, to make the journey to Rome with an interpreter. They started in September, 1825, were received affectionately in the Eternal City, and by order of the Pope were given a long course of instruction by Camaldolese abbot Mauro Capellari (afterwards Gregory XVI). Finally, on 18 December, they were received in private audience by Leo XII, who confirmed everything to them and received their submission. The three deputies returned home in January 1826, appeared before the archbishop, and declared to him their allegiance. Two canons, sent into Brixenthal as representatives of the archbishop, received the profession of allegiance of the remaining Manharter. However, in Innthatl, a minority of the sect, led by Maria Sillober of Kirchbichl, refused to submit and continued to persist in their sectarianism. They argued that Leo XII, having set himself in contradiction to Pius VII, was not a lawful pope, and that the Holy See was for the time vacant. Thus the sect endured still a few dozen years with a restricted following until at last it disappeared completely with the death of its last adherents.
