= Steinbergstein =

Mountain in Tyrol, Austria

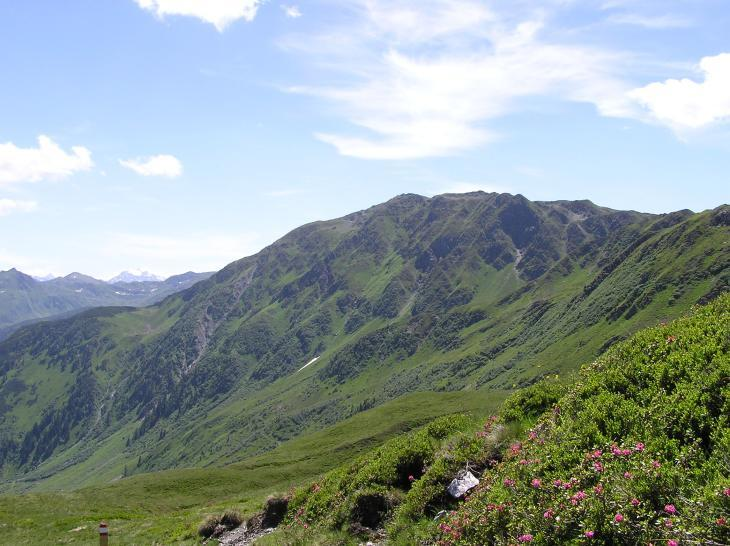
- View of the northern flank of the Steinbergstein

Highest point
- Elevation: 2,215 m (AA) (7,267 ft)
- Coordinates: 47°20′25″N 12°11′20″E

Geography
- Location within Austria
- Location: Tyrol, Austria
- Parent range: Kitzbühel Alps

Climbing
- Normal route: from Kelchsau through the Lodron alms (Lodronalmen) to the summit

The Steinbergstein is a mountain, 2,215 m (AA) (7,267 ft) high, in the Kitzbühel Alps in Austria.

== Location ==
The Steinbergstein rises between the valleys of the Windauer Ache and the Kelchsauer Ache. The cirque between the north face of the Steinbergstein, the Ramkarkopf (2,063 m) and the Steinberg (1,886 m), which is rich in springs, forms the Steinberggraben stream that empties into the Windauer Ache river. The source of the Trattenbach stream lies to the south of the Steinberg, feeding the Kurze Grundache, a tributary of the Kelchsauer Ache.

== Use ==
Above the tree line the open slopes are used as grazing grounds for sheep, goats, cows and horses. In summer, flocks of sheep are especially common around the summit. A material ropeway runs from the Gamskogel Hut to the Lagfelden Alm. The hiking trails are all marked with tree-mounted and ground-based signs.

== Ascent ==
From Kelchsau the route runs along the track past the Sonnblick snack bar to the Demmels Hut. From here it runs through the Lodron Alm through open alpine pasture up to the summit of the Lodron (1,925 m). From here it is a 1½ hour walk to the top of Steinbergstein. Five hours should be allowed for the whole journey.

Another route runs along the trafficable forest track in the Windautal valley then continues to the foot of the Kröndlhorn mountain, up to the Steinberghaus and the Gamskogel Hut. The shortest, but hardest, route runs along the eastern flank from the Gamskogel Hut through the Ahornau Alm steeply uphill to the Lagfelden Alm. From here it crosses open terrain on an unmetalled, but signposted route up to the summit. There is also an ascent from the Steinberghaus that runs alongside the Steinberggraben through the Neuhögen Alms and the Oberkar Alm up to the Lodronjoch saddle. From there it continues over the Ramkarkopf to the Steinbergstein.

The trails, particularly the one along the eastern flank, demand a steady footing from hikers. During the winter months, the Steinbergstein is a demanding location for ski touring.

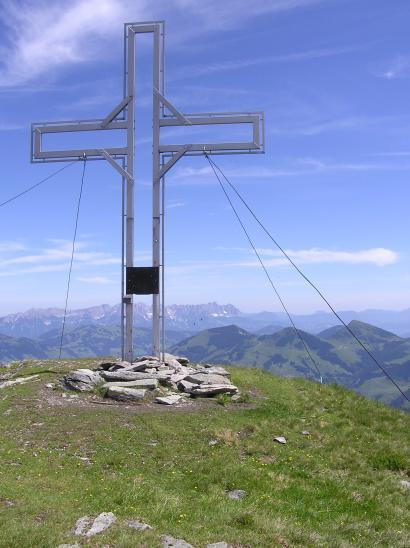
The summit cross of the Steinbergstein

== Summit ==
The Steinbergstein has a summit cross made of steel where there is a stamp and a summit register. The present cross was erected in summer 1978.

The summit offers an impressive view over the Brixental valley and the Kaisergebirge mountains to the north. The crest of the Kitzbühel Alps, with its prominent peaks of the Salzachgeier (2,466 m) and the Kröndlhorn (2,444 m) stretch away to the south.
