= Windautal =

Valley in the Kitzbühel Alps in Tyrol, Austria

Coordinates: 47°22′09″N 12°13′17″E

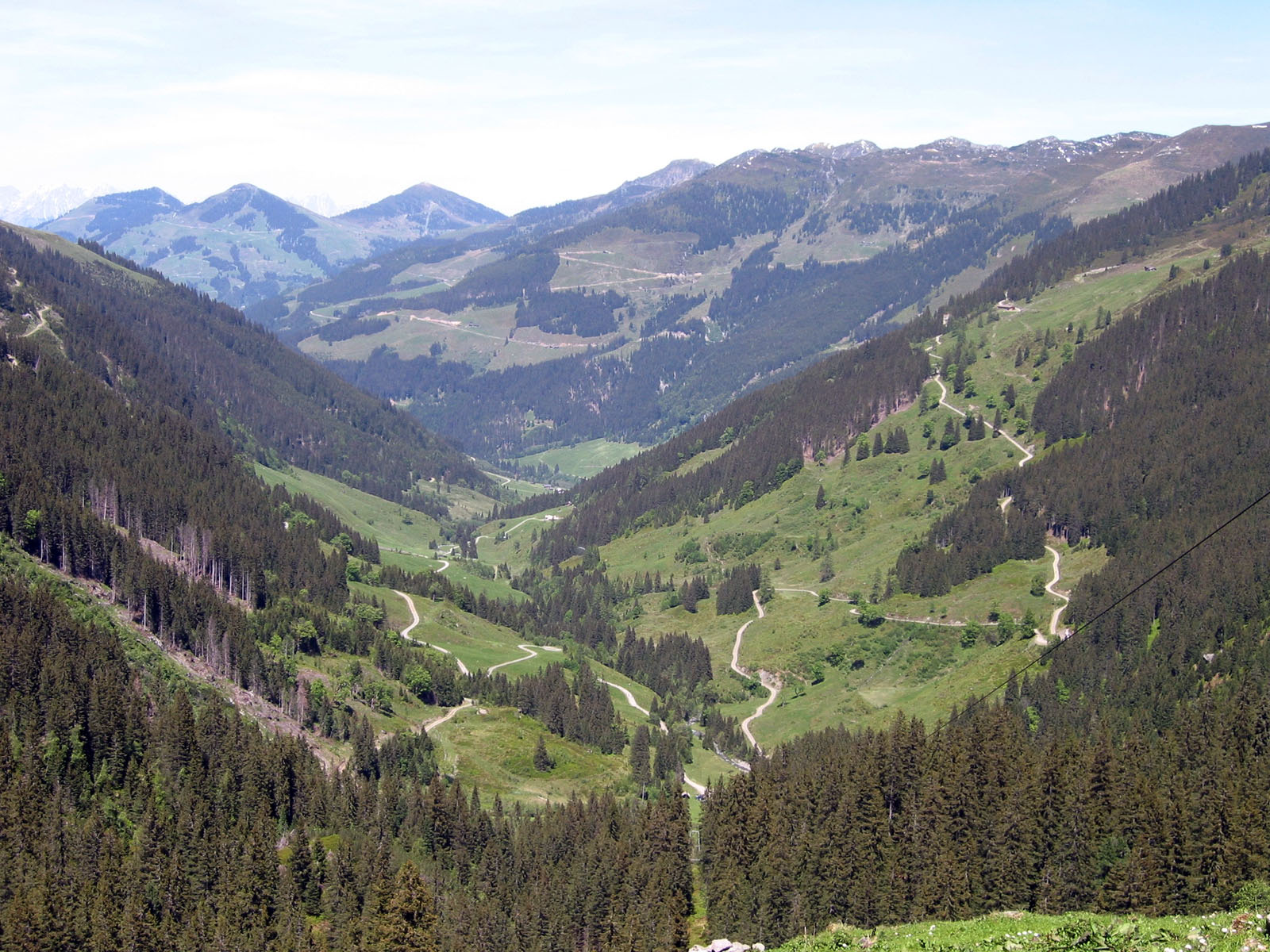
The Windautal looking out of the valley

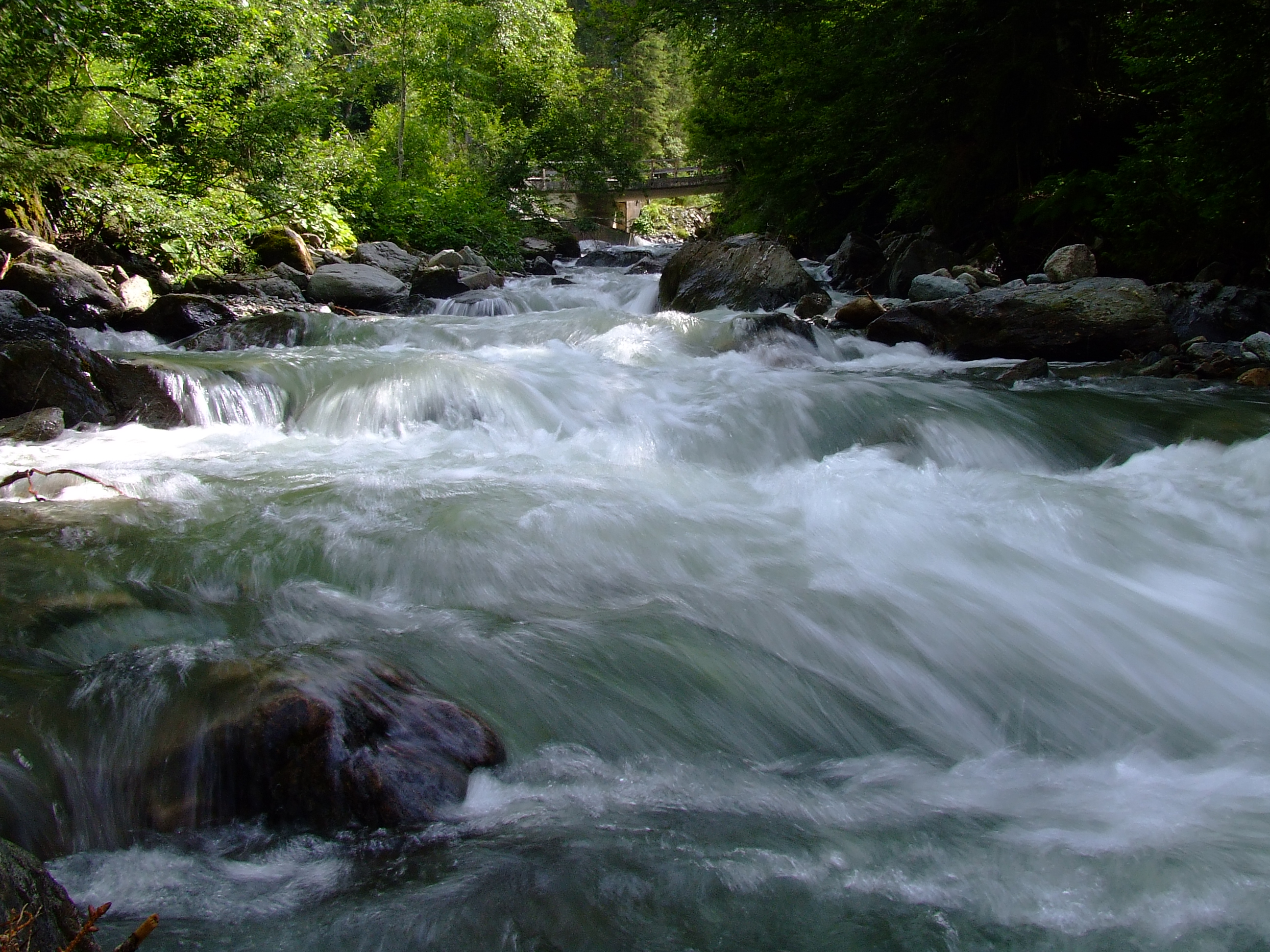
The Windauer Ache

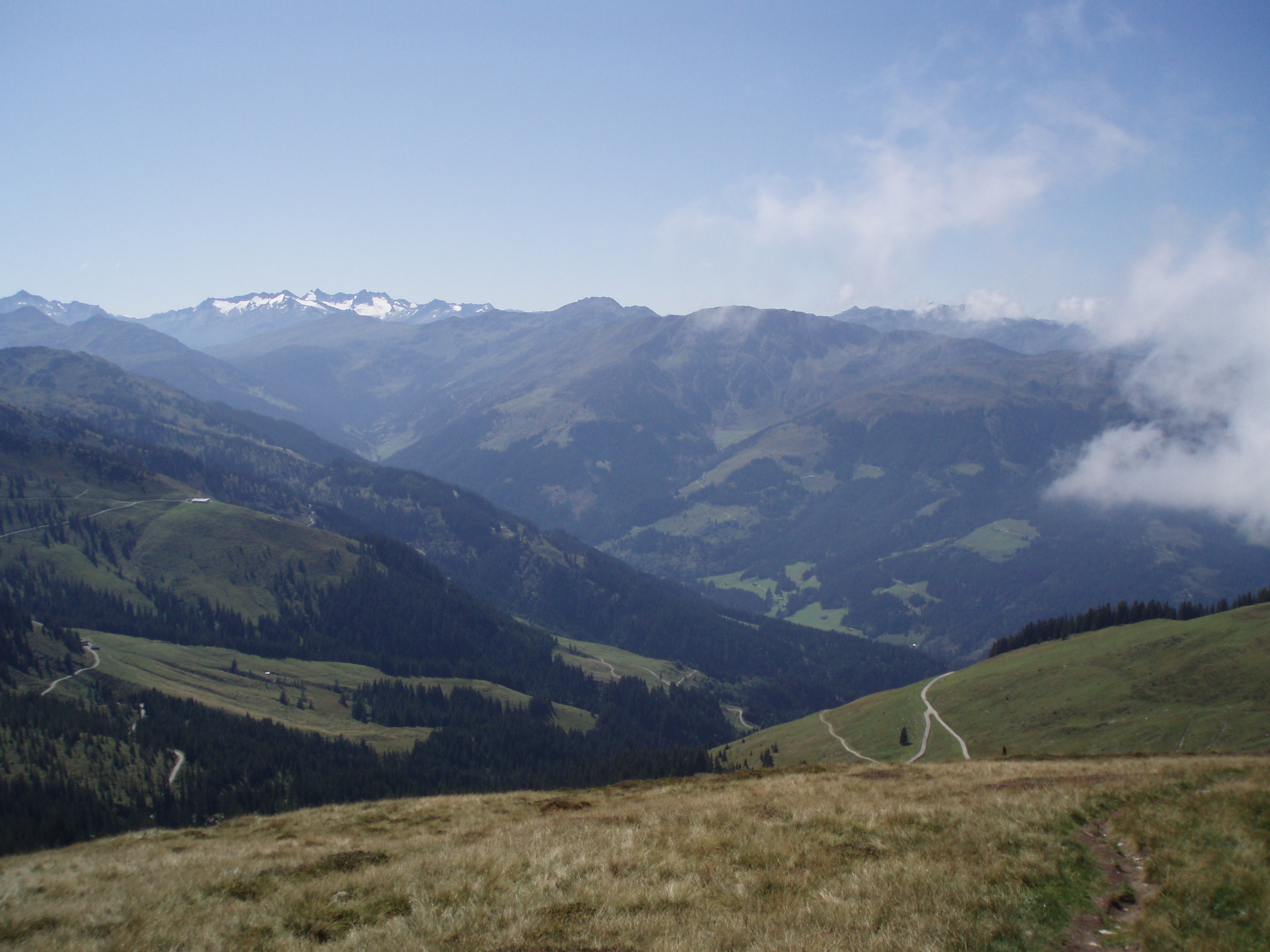
The Windautal from the Gampenkogel

The Windautal is a southern side valley of the Tyrolean Brixental in the Kitzbühel Alps in Austria with a length of about 16 km.

The valley is lies almost entirely within the territory of the parish of Westendorf; only its northernmost part lies in Hopfgarten. To the south the valley borders on the state of Salzburg. To the north - near Hopfgarten (623 m) - the Windautal and Brixental valleys merge. The stream of the Windauer Ache flows through the Windau and discharges into the Brixentaler Ache.

In the 16th and 17th centuries, copper, galena and pyrites were mined in the valley.

The Windautal is a popular recreation area and a particularly good for ski tours, hiking, mountain biking and cycling. The route through the valley along the lower reaches of the Windauer Ache is part of the "Kaiser Circuit (Kaiser-Runde), a long distance circular cycleway that starts and ends in Kufstein. The Windauer Ache is also popular with whitewater canoeists (grade WW II to WW V).

The southern part of the valley is only accessible by car over a toll road (partly unmetalled) and is very sparsely settled.

The Salzburg-Tyrol Railway runs along the slopes and through several tunnels of the lower (northern) Windautal, where, in the middle of a curve, a bridge spans the valley. On the northeastern perimeter of the valley is the halt of "Windau". This so-called Windauer Schleife ("Windau Curve"), which is used to gain height in the valley and is very scenic, is a popular photographic theme with railway photographers.

The landscape of the valley is characterised by wooded mountains and numerous alpine meadows (Almen). Above the tree line the open slopes are used as grazing pasture for sheep, goats, cows and horses.

The Windau is surrounded by a large number of peaks, most of them over 2,000 metres high. Important mountains are the Steinbergstein (2,215 m), the Kröndlhorn (2,444 m) and the Brechhorn (2,032 m).
