= Lumper =

Lumper may refer to:

- a scholar who assigns examples broadly, judging that differences are not as important as signature similarities, in various fields such as history, linguistics, software engineering, taxonomy, or liturgical studies, see Lumpers and splitters
- a dockworker who unloads fish at British fishing ports, or formerly in Australia anyone engaged in loading and unloading ships' cargo
- a person who loads or unloads a semi-trailer

As a proper noun, Lumper may refer to:

- Gottfried Lumper (1747–1800), German Benedictine patristic writer
- An Irish Lumper, a waxy potato whose vulnerability to blight resulted in mid-19th century famines

== See also ==
- Lumpenproletariat
