= Brechhorn =

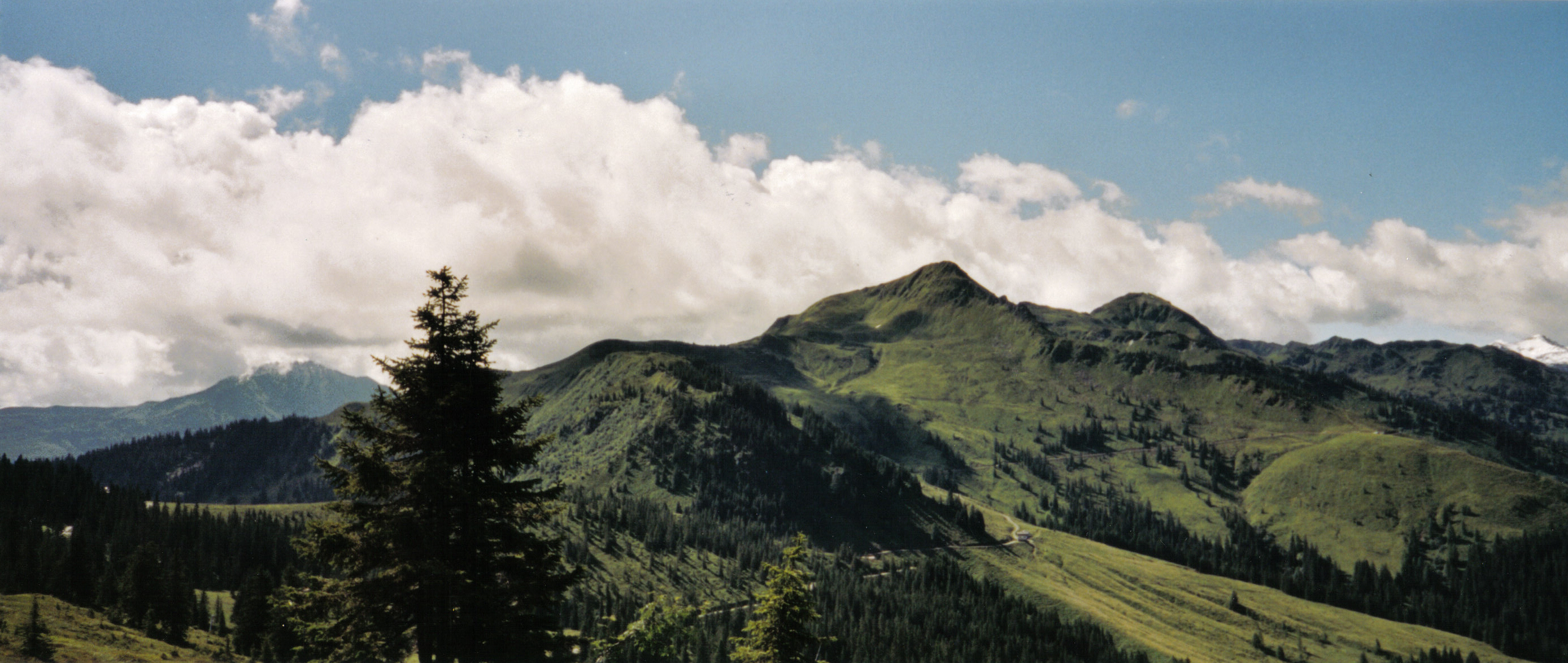
- Panorama of the northern flanks of the Brechhorn (centre)

Highest point
- Elevation: 2,032 m (AA) (6,667 ft)
- Coordinates: 47°22′41″N 12°15′57″E

Geography
- Location within Austria
- Location: Tyrol, Austria
- Parent range: Kitzbühel Alps

Climbing
- Normal route: from the Brechhornhaus over the Schledererkopf (1,801 m) to the summit

The Brechhorn is a 2,032 m above sea level (AA) high mountain in the Kitzbühel Alps in Austria. It lies between the valleys of the Aschauer Ache and the Windau.

== Use ==
The upper slopes of the mountain are used to some extent for grazing sheep, goats, cows and horses. No ski lifts, material ropeways or motor vehicle tracks run beyond the Brechhornhaus (1,660 m), which means that the scenery during an ascent remains largely unspoilt.

== Ascent ==
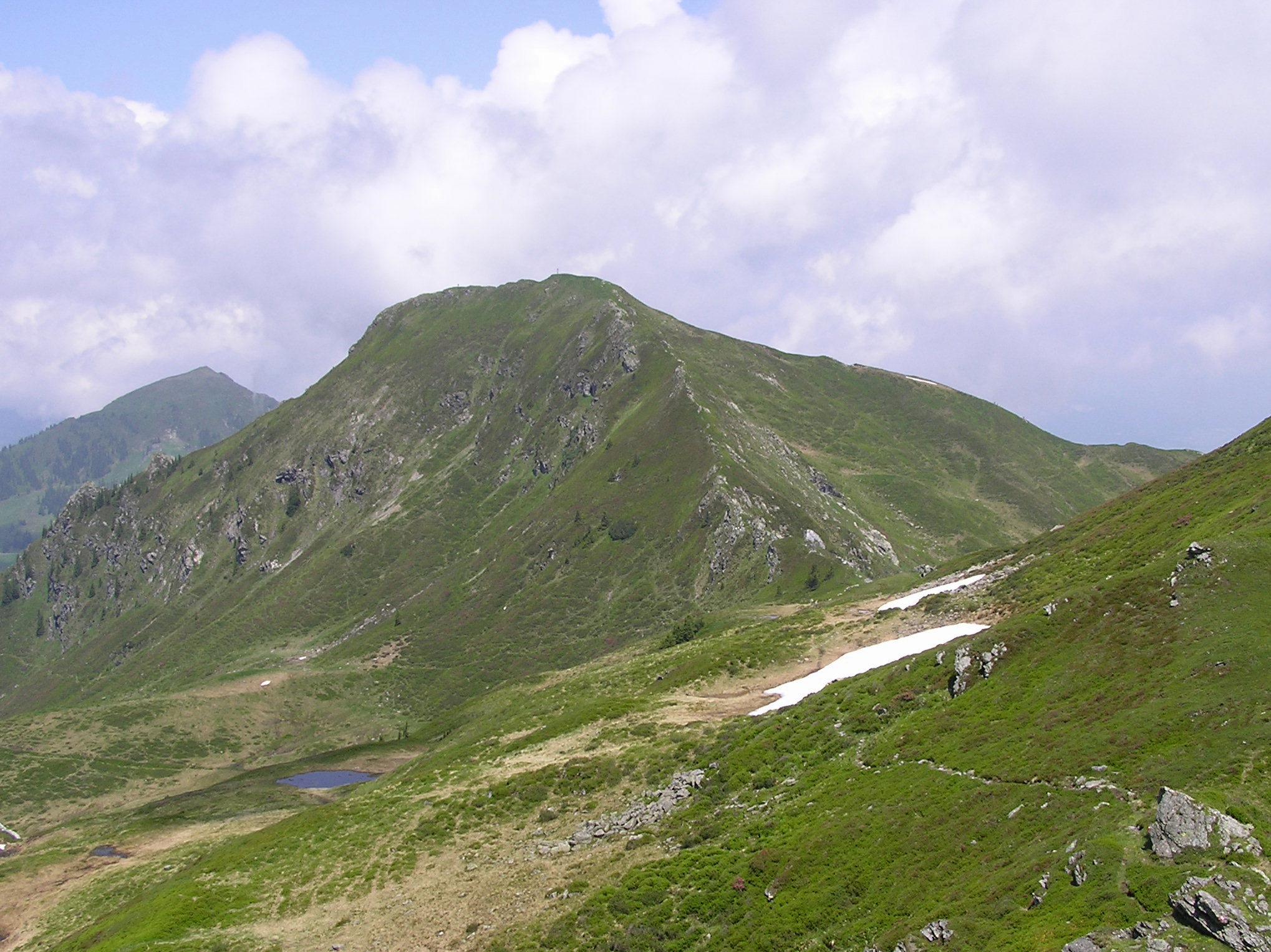
The Brechhorn from the south

The most commonly used bases for an ascent of the Brechhorn are Aschau and Westendorf. The trails are all marked and, in places, well-signposted.

From Westendorf, hikers catch the Alpenrosenbahn cableway on the Nachtsöllberg to the 1,760 m high Talkaser and can then reach the Brechhornhaus quickly over two routes (east and west of the Fleiding peak). The house lies on the Kreuzjoch between the Gampenkogel and the Brechhorn, and is a good base for the subsequent climb.

In winter the mountain is especially popular with ski tourists and snowshoe walkers, who usually set off from Kirchberg i.T. and Aschau. The road is cleared during normal winter conditions as far as the car park at the start of the toll road. This route runs along the eastern flank of the mountain through the alpine pastures of Ebenau Alm, Durach Alm and Breitlab Alm, passing the Duracher Kogel (1,773 m) peak on the way. It takes about 2 hours 50 minutes to reach the summit.

=== Link to the Floch ===
The summit of the Floch (2,057 m) may be reached from the top of the Brechhorn on a short, unmarked, southerly trail that descends and then climbs again. This route also enables a descent into the Windautal valley, the trail running over the western flank of the mountain and through the cirque between the Brechhorn and the Floch. From the Brandeggalm a track runs to the ridgeway at Fleiding. The descent from the Brechhorn in a southerly direction is however only recommended for sure-footed hikers with a head for heights.

== Summit ==
The summit has a summit cross made of wood and steel, where there is a stamp and a summit register.

To the north, the peaks of the Hohe Salve, Nachtsöllberg, Fleiding and Gampenkogel form an impressive array of high one-thousanders. To the south the view ranges over the Windautal valley and the main crest of the Kitzbühel Alps, including the Kröndlhorn (2,444 m) and Salzachgeier (2,466 m). To the southeast is the imposing and rugged flank of the Großer Rettenstein (2,366 m).
