= Reinkarsee =

- Location within Austria
- Location: Tyrol, Austria
- Coordinates: 47°17′54″N 12°09′52″E
- Type: lake
- Primary outflows: Windauer Ache

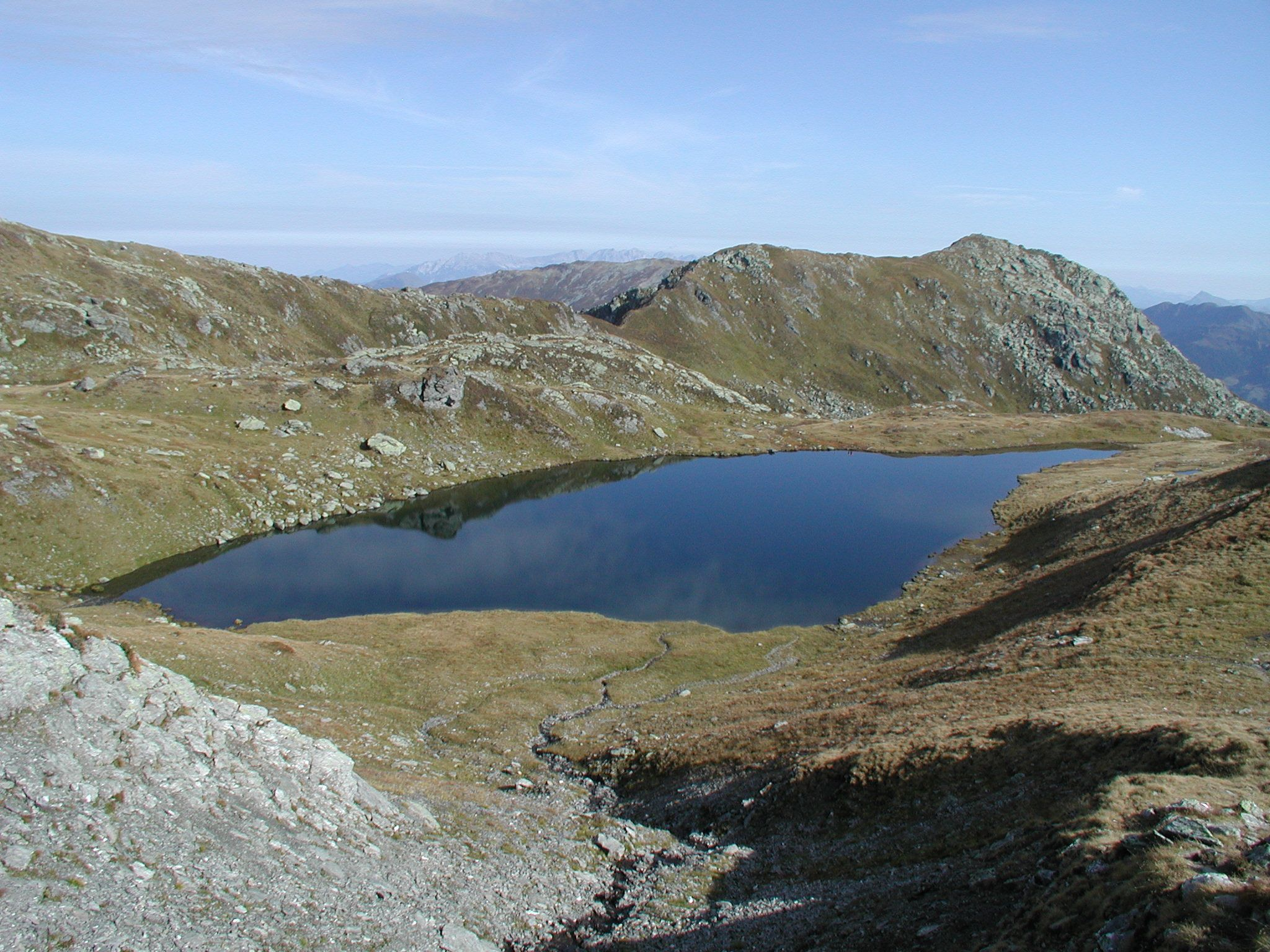
Reinkarsee seen from the south

Reinkarsee is a lake of Tyrol, Austria, northeast of the Kröndlhorn. It is drained by the Windauer Ache, a tributary of the Brixentaler Ache.
