= Kelchsauer Ache =

River in Austria

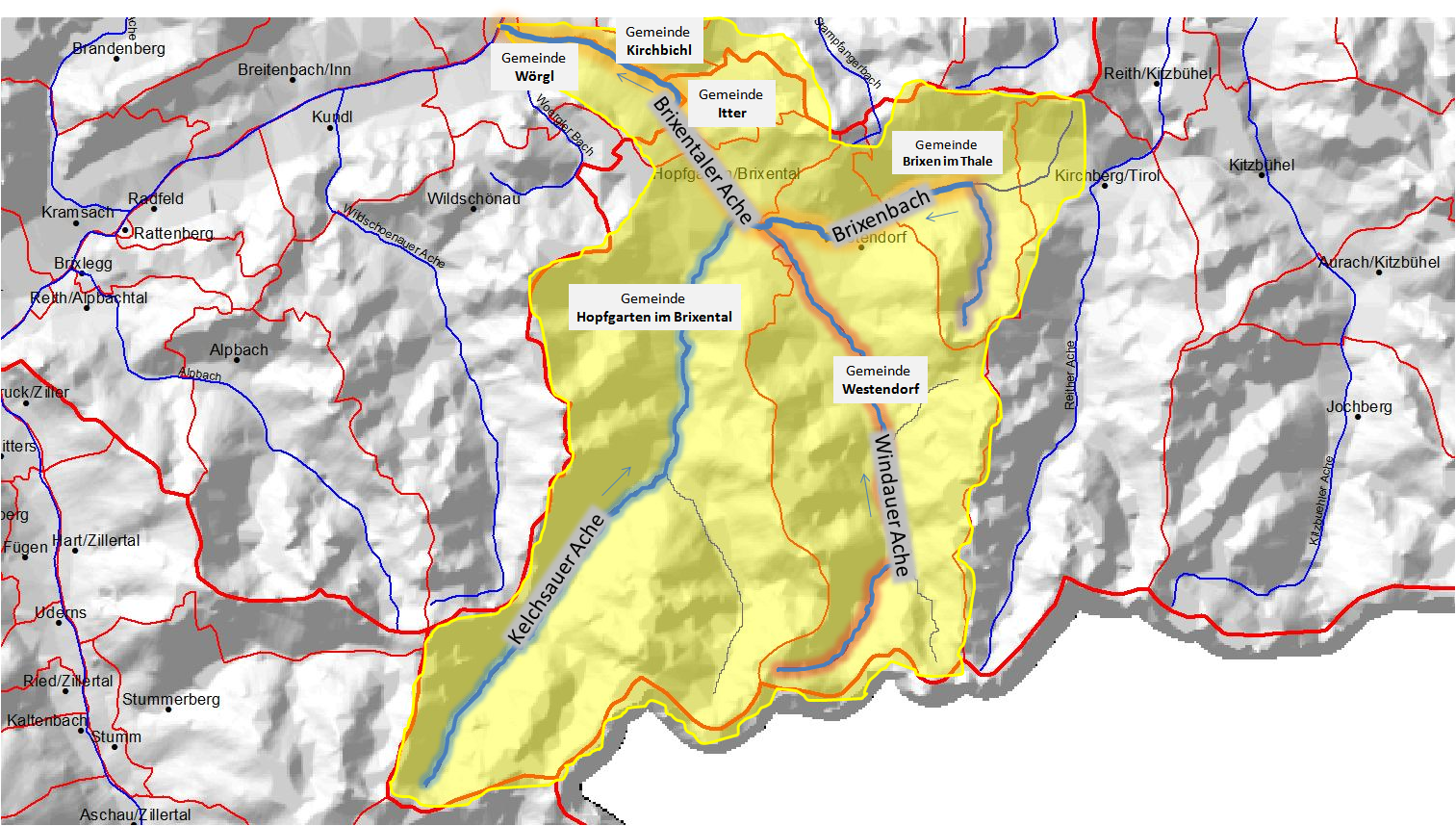
- Kelchsauer Ache (blue) in the catchment area of the Brixentaler Ache

Location
- Country: Austria
- State: Tyrol

Physical characteristics
- Source
  - location: confluence of the Langer-Grund-Ache and the Kurzer-Grund-Ache near Kelchsau
  - coordinates: 47.3683°N 12.1286°E
- Mouth
  - location: at Hopfgarten im Brixental into the Brixentaler Ache
  - coordinates: 47.4419°N 12.1615°E

Basin features
- Progression: Brixentaler Ache→ Inn→ Danube→ Black Sea

Kelchsauer Ache is a river of Tyrol, Austria.

The source of the Kelchsauer Ache is the confluence of its two headstreams, the Langer-Grund-Ache and the Kurzer-Grund-Ache near Kelchsau. It discharges into the Brixentaler Ache at Hopfgarten im Brixental.

== Background ==
In Hopfgarten im Brixental, the Kelchsauer Ache flows into the Brixentaler Ache. This is thus a large right tributary of the Inn River. The drainage area measures just about 138 square kilometres, all within the limits of the municipality of Hopfgarten. The Brixentaler Ache has an even larger catchment area of 329 square kilometres, being among the largest tributaries draining into the Inn on the Tyrolean Unterland side.

== Short summary and role ==
In short, the Kelchsauer Ache is a typical mountain river shaped by its high alpine sources and steep gradient with relation to the Kitzbühel Alps. It is important for the regional water cycle, serves as a recreational facility, and provides renewable energy to the locality.
