= Andreas Benedict Feilmoser =

Andreas Benedict Feilmoser (born 8 April 1777, in Hopfgarten, Tyrol; d. Tübingen, 20 July 1831) was a theologian and Biblical scholar.

== Life ==
He studied at Salzburg from 1789 to 1794, took a two years' course in philosophy at the University of Innsbruck (1794–96), and entered the Benedictine Order at Fiecht, Tyrol, in September, 1796. At this abbey he studied the Middle Eastern languages under Georg Maurer, a monk of St. George's Abbey, Villingen. For his theological studies he was sent to Villingen, where he again heard Maurer and Gottfried Lumper, both eminent scholars.

Returning to Fiecht in 1800, he taught Biblical exegesis and was ordained priest in 1801; late in the same year he was appointed master of novices, in 1802 professor of Christian ethics and in 1803 of ecclesiastical history. A number of theses which he published in 1803 aroused the suspicions of the ecclesiastical authorities of the Diocese of Brixen. The Abbot of Fiecht was sharply rebuked for permitting Feilmoser to teach what was considered unsound doctrine. In 1804 appeared Feilmoser's Animadversiones in historiam ecclesiasticam, which did not meet the approval of the diocesan authorities, who threatened, in case Feilmoser did not desist from advancing dangerous opinions, to institute proceedings against the abbot. To Feilmoser's request for a specification of the objectionable passages in his writings no reply was made, but the entire matter was reported to the emperor in Vienna. An investigation instituted by order of the emperor resulted favourably for Feilmoser. He was, nevertheless, removed from the office of master of novices and in 1806 was made assistant in the parish of Achenthal.

By the Treaty of Pressburg (26 December 1805) Tyrol was cut off from Austria and became a part of Bavaria. The new Government, in November, 1806, appointed him professor of Semitic languages and of introduction to the Old Testament at the University of Innsbruck. The monastery of Fiecht having been suppressed in 1807, he left the order. At Innsbruck he received the degree of Doctor of Theology in 1808 and was appointed to the chair of New Testament exegesis. During the Tyrolese insurrection, August, 1809, he, with a number of other professors, was taken prisoner and carried to Pusterthal by order of Andreas Hofer.

In 1810 he returned to Innsbruck, in 1811 he was made professor of catechetics, in 1812 of Latin and Greek philology, and in 1817 was reappointed professor of New-Testament exegesis in the face of much opposition. About this time the old charges against him were revived, and in 1818 he was bitterly attacked in an anonymous work published at Augsburg. He was denied the opportunity of publicly defending himself, inasmuch as the imperial censor in Vienna, on 17 July 1819, decided that since the anonymous work was published in a foreign country, it was under Austrian censure and must be regarded as non-existent. On 25 April 1820, he was formally appointed a professor at the University of Tübingen, where he continued to teach New Testament exegesis until his death.

== Works ==
Feilmoser's exegetical writings are influenced by the rationalistic spirit of his day. He denied the genuineness of the Comma Johanneum and maintained that the Books of Job, Jonas, Tobias, and Judith are merely didactic poems.

- Sätze aus der christlichen Sittenlehre für die öffentliche Prüfung in dem Benedictinerstifte zu Fiecht (Innsbruck, 1803)
- Sätze aus der Einleitung in die Bücher des alten Bundes und den hebraischen Alterhumern (Innsbruch, 1803)
- Animaversiones in historiam ecclesiasticam (Innsbruck, 1803)
- Sätze aus der Einleitung in die Bücher des neuen Bundes und der bibli. Hermeneutik (Innsbruck, 1804)
- Einleitung in die Bücher des neuen Bundes (Innsbruck, 1810)
- Auszug des hebr. Sprachlehre nach Jahn (Innsburck 1812)
- Die Verketzerrungssucht (Rottweil, 1820)
- His principal work, Einleitung in die Bucher des neuen Bundes, published in a revised edition (Tübingen, 1830) considered to be inaccurate.
- Papers and criticisms in the Annalen der osterreichischen Litteratur und Kunst and the Theologische Quartal-schrift of Tübingen.
