= Brixentaler Ache =

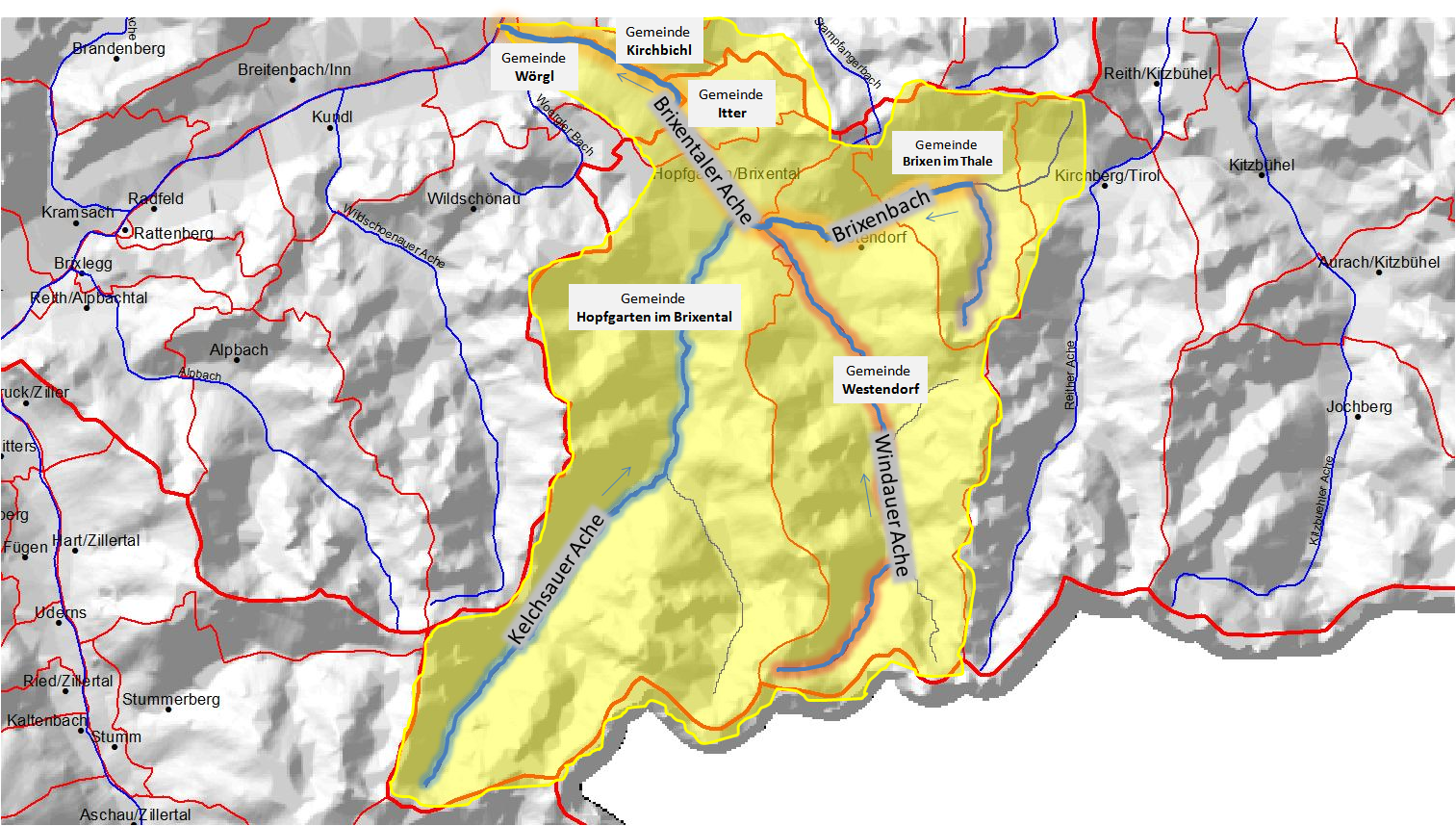
- The diagram shows the tributaries coming from the south, the Kelchsauer Ache (blue highlights) and Windauer Ache (red highlights); the Brixentaler Ache (orange) rises as the Brixenbach (violet) in Brixen im Thale and empties in Wörgl into the Inn. The catchment area of the Brixentaler Ache is shaded in yellow.

Location
- Country: Austria
- State: Tyrol
- Districts: Kufstein and Kitzbühel

Physical characteristics
- Source
  - location: Einködlscharte on the mountain Gampenkogel in Brixen im Thale
  - coordinates: 47°24′09″N 12°15′21″E
  - elevation: 1,700 m (AA)
- Mouth
  - location: near Wörgl into the Inn
  - coordinates: 47°29′59″N 12°03′33″E
  - elevation: 500 m (AA)
- Length: 26.4 km (16.4 mi)
- Basin size: 329 km^{2} (127 sq mi)

Basin features
- Progression: Inn→ Danube→ Black Sea
- Landmarks: Small towns: Wörgl; Villages: Brixen im Thale, Westendorf, Hopfgarten im Brixental, Itter, Kirchbichl, Angath
- Population: ca. 14,000
- Tributaries
  - left: Windauer Ache, Kelchsauer Ache
- Navigable: not navigable

The Brixentaler Ache is a river of Tyrol, Austria, a right tributary of the Inn. It passes through the districts of Kitzbühel and Kufstein. It is one of the largest tributaries of the Inn in the Tyrolean Unterland by catchment area (329 km^{2} (127 sq mi)), but is only 26.4 km (16.4 mi) long.

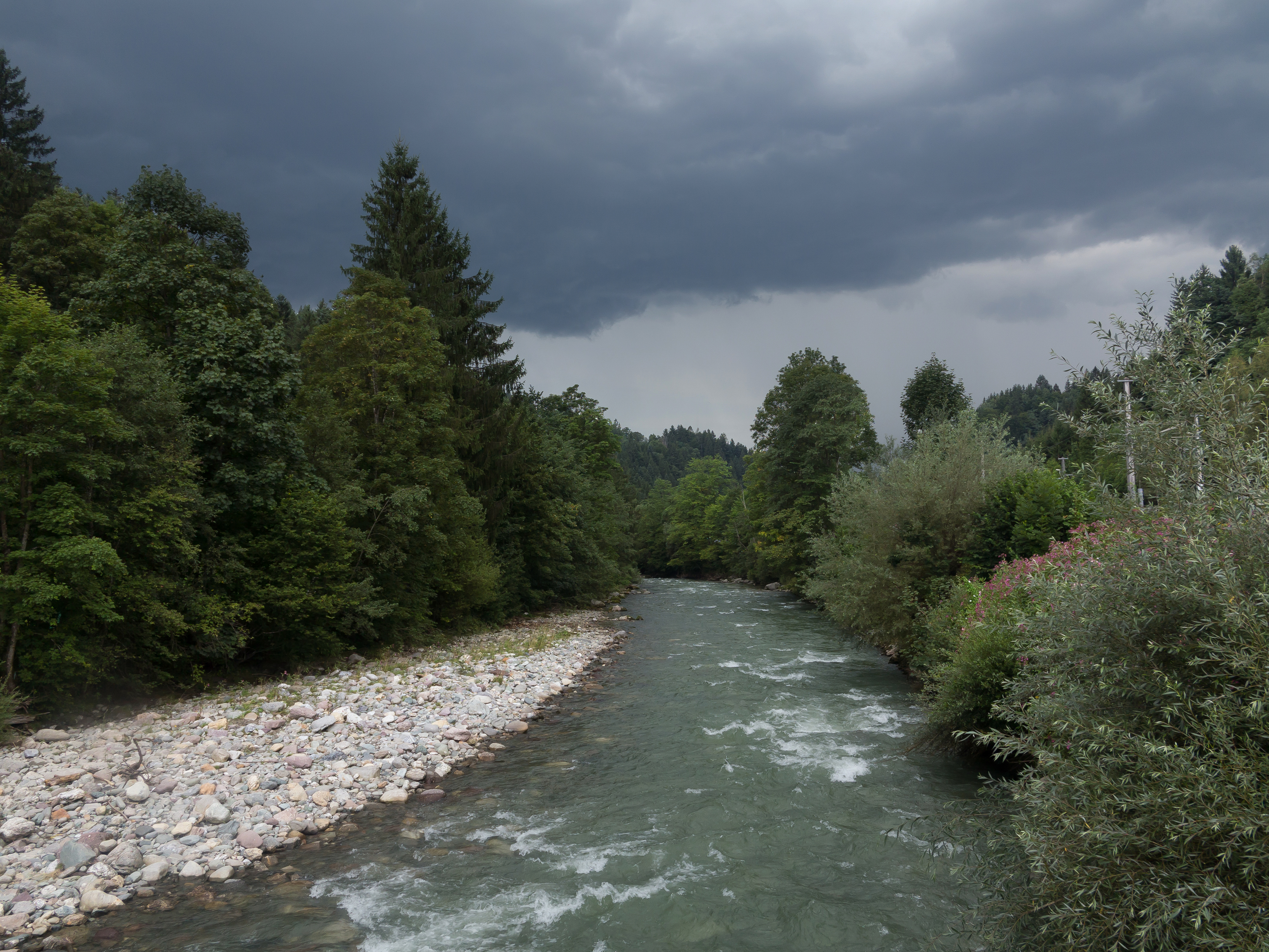
Brixentaler Ache in Hopfgarten

== Course ==
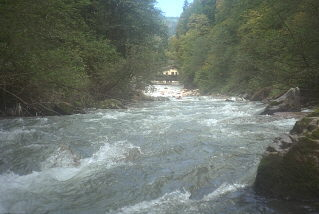
The Ache in the Itter Gorge

The Brixentaler Ache rises as the Brixenbach in the territory of Brixen im Thale and flows westwards through the Brixental, a southeastern valley of the Lower Inn Valley. Between Westendorf and Hopfgarten im Brixental (the main village in the valley), the valley floor narrows. Immediately after this bottleneck the Windauer Ache joins the Brixenbach from the south. From this confluence the Brixenbach is known as the Brixentaler Ache. After about one kilometre the larger Kelchsauer Ache joins the river (also from the south). The 26 km (16 mi) long Kelchsauer Ache drains the entire Kelchsau area.

Between Hopfgarten and the section of river forming the boundary between Kirchbichl and Wörgl, the Ache is again forced through a gorge, before it breaks out into the plains of the Inn Valley. On leaving the gorge the Ache is impounded by a large weir and part of the water is diverted into a channel that leads to a small power station run by Tiroler Wasserkraft. Below the weir the Luecher Bach enters the main stream from the direction of Söll to the north. After having been fed by so much water from its large tributaries the Ache now dominates the landscape of the broad and densely settled Brixental valley. After the now around 16 metres (52 ft) wide Brixentaler Ache has flowed through Wörgl, it discharges from the south into the Inn.

The river's catchment area is relatively large, especially as a result of its tributaries, the Windauer Ache and Kelchsauer Ache, and covers about a third of the territory of Kitzbühel District.
