= Westendorf, Tyrol =

Westendorf
- Municipality
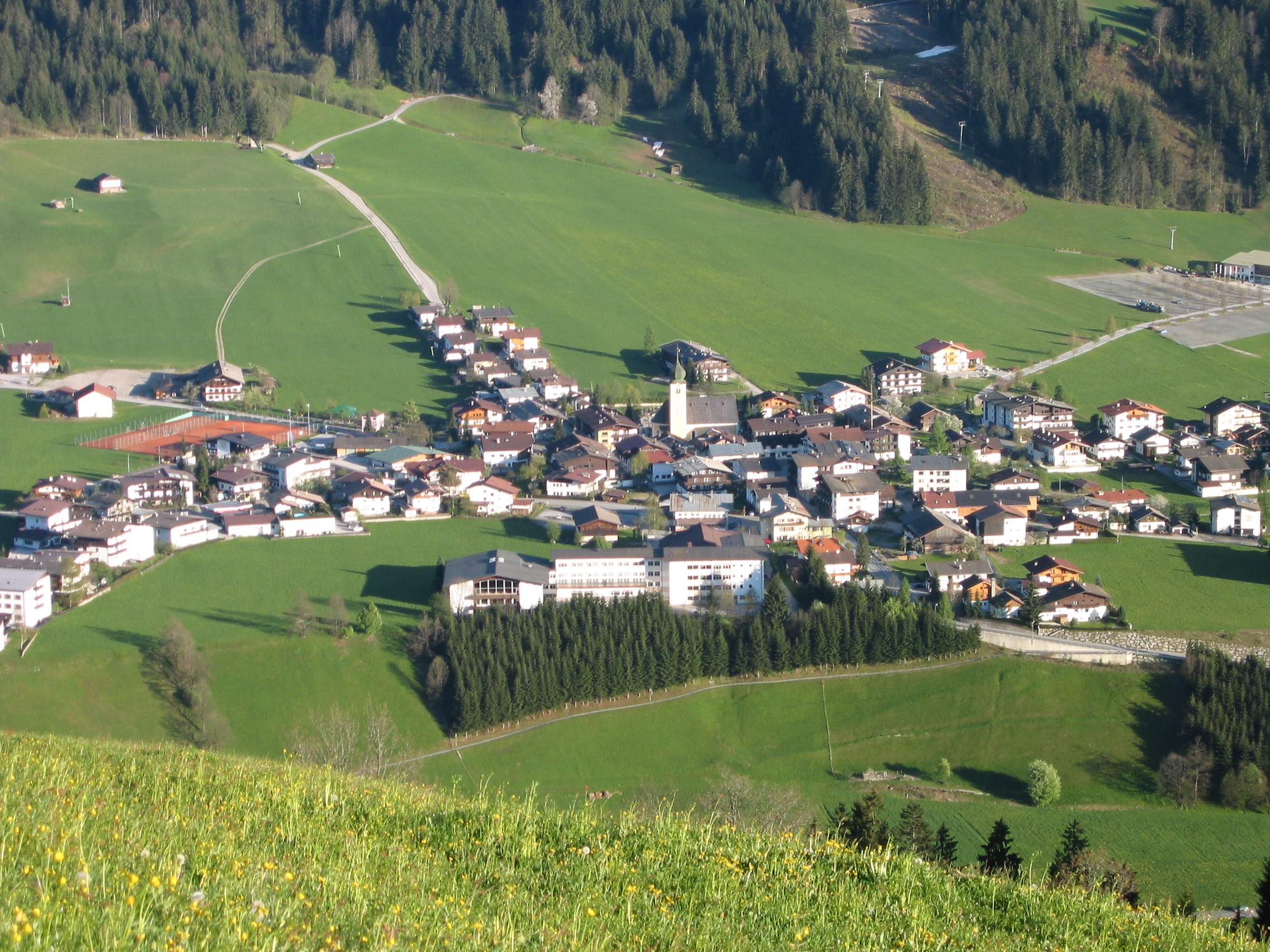
- Center of Westendorf

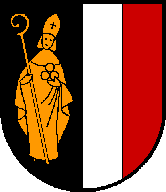
- Coat of arms

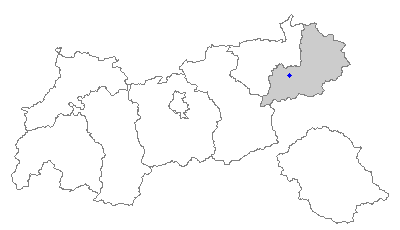
- Location of Westendorf within Tyrol

- Location within Austria
- Coordinates: 47°24′00″N 12°12′00″E
- Country: Austria
- State: Tyrol
- District: Kitzbühel

Government
  - Mayor: Annemarie Plieseis

Area
  - Total: 95.49 km^{2} (36.87 sq mi)
- Elevation: 783 m (2,569 ft)

Population (2021)
  - Total: 3,664
  - Density: 38.37/km^{2} (99.38/sq mi)
- Time zone: UTC+1 (CET)
  - Summer (DST): UTC+2 (CEST)
- Postal code: 6363
- Area code: 05334
- Vehicle registration: KB
- Website: www.westendorf.tirol.gv.at

Westendorf (Austrian German pronunciation: [ˈvɛstn̩ˌdɔrf]) is a municipality and a village in the Kitzbühel district in the Austrian state of Tyrol located 13.7 km west of Kitzbühel and 12 km southeast of Wörgl in the Brixental valley. The community is a popular ski resort as well as a popular location for Summer tourism especially for excursions and walking-tours. Westendorf was mentioned for the first time in documents in 1234. It has 21 village parts.

== Geography ==
Westendorf lies on a sunny terrace of the Brixental valley at the foot of the Choralpe. The parish consists of a clustered village (Haufendorf) and other hamlets and farmsteads in the surrounding area, as well as an industrial estate. To the south the Windautal, a popular recreation area, branches off.

A large part of the woods was cleared for agricultural purposes.

Rivers: The Brixentaler Ache and the Windauer Ache flows through the parish.

Mountains: Important mountains are the Hohe Salve (1,828m), the Steinbergstein (2,215m), the Kröndlhorn (2,444m) and the Brechhorn (2,032m).

== Population ==
Historical population
Year	Pop.	±%
1869	1,324	—
1880	1,370	+3.5%
1890	1,300	−5.1%
1900	1,367	+5.2%
1910	1,605	+17.4%
1923	1,648	+2.7%
1934	1,802	+9.3%
1939	1,783	−1.1%
1951	2,034	+14.1%
1961	2,228	+9.5%
1971	2,681	+20.3%
1981	2,810	+4.8%
1991	3,157	+12.3%
2001	3,454	+9.4%
2011	3,597	+4.1%

== See also ==
- Manharter
