= Windauer Ache =

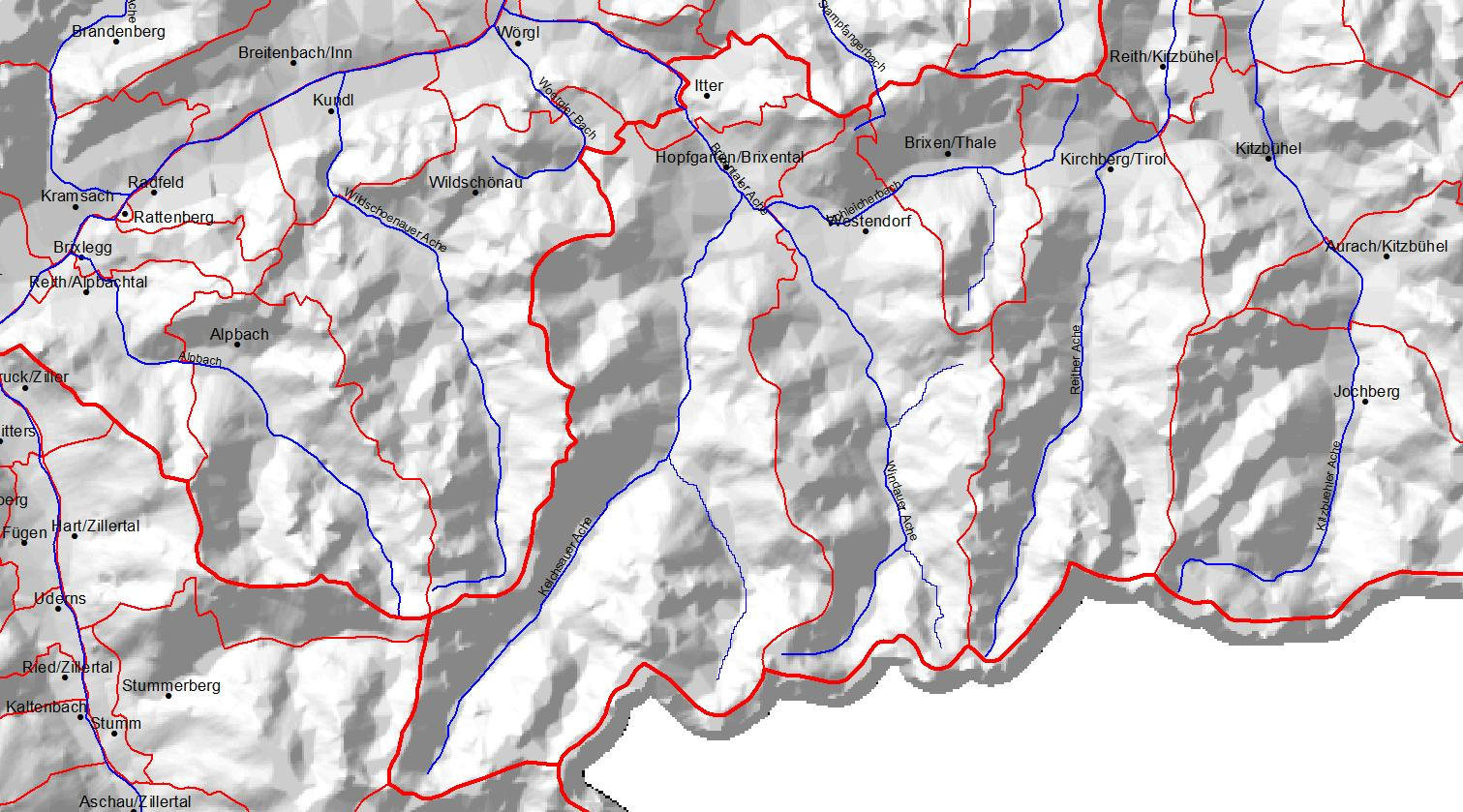
- The diagram shows the course of the Windauer Ache, which flows in a northerly direction - from the Salzburg border to Hopfgarten.

Location
- Country: Austria
- State: Tyrol
- Location: in the Windautal / Kitzbühel Alps

Physical characteristics
- Source
  - location: Reinkarsee on the Kröndlhorn
  - coordinates: 47°18′25″N 12°10′15″E
  - elevation: 2,200 m (AA)
- Mouth
  - location: In Haslau / Hopfgarten into the Brixentaler Ache
  - coordinates: 47°26′17″N 12°10′18″E
  - elevation: 630 m (AA)
- Length: 22.0 km (13.7 mi)

Basin features
- Progression: Brixentaler Ache→ Inn→ Danube→ Black Sea
- Landmarks: Villages: Westendorf and Hopfgarten
- Tributaries
  - left: Falberbach, Dürrnbach
  - right: Miesenbach, Rettenbach
- Waterbodies: Lakes: Reinkarsee

The Windauer Ache is a mountain stream in Tyrol, Austria, in the scenic Windautal valley in the Kitzbühel Alps.

The Ache rises on the Reinkarsee at about 2,200 m (AA), at the foot of the Kröndlhorn, and its middle reaches run through a roughly 4 km (2.5 mi) long gorge. In Hopfgarten the Windauer Ache discharges into the Brixentaler Ache at a narrow point in the valley; the Brixentaler Ache in turn empties into the River Inn at Wörgl.

The Ache flows through the municipalities of Westendorf and Hopfgarten.

The Windauer Ache is very popular for whitewater canoeing (grade WW II to WW V).

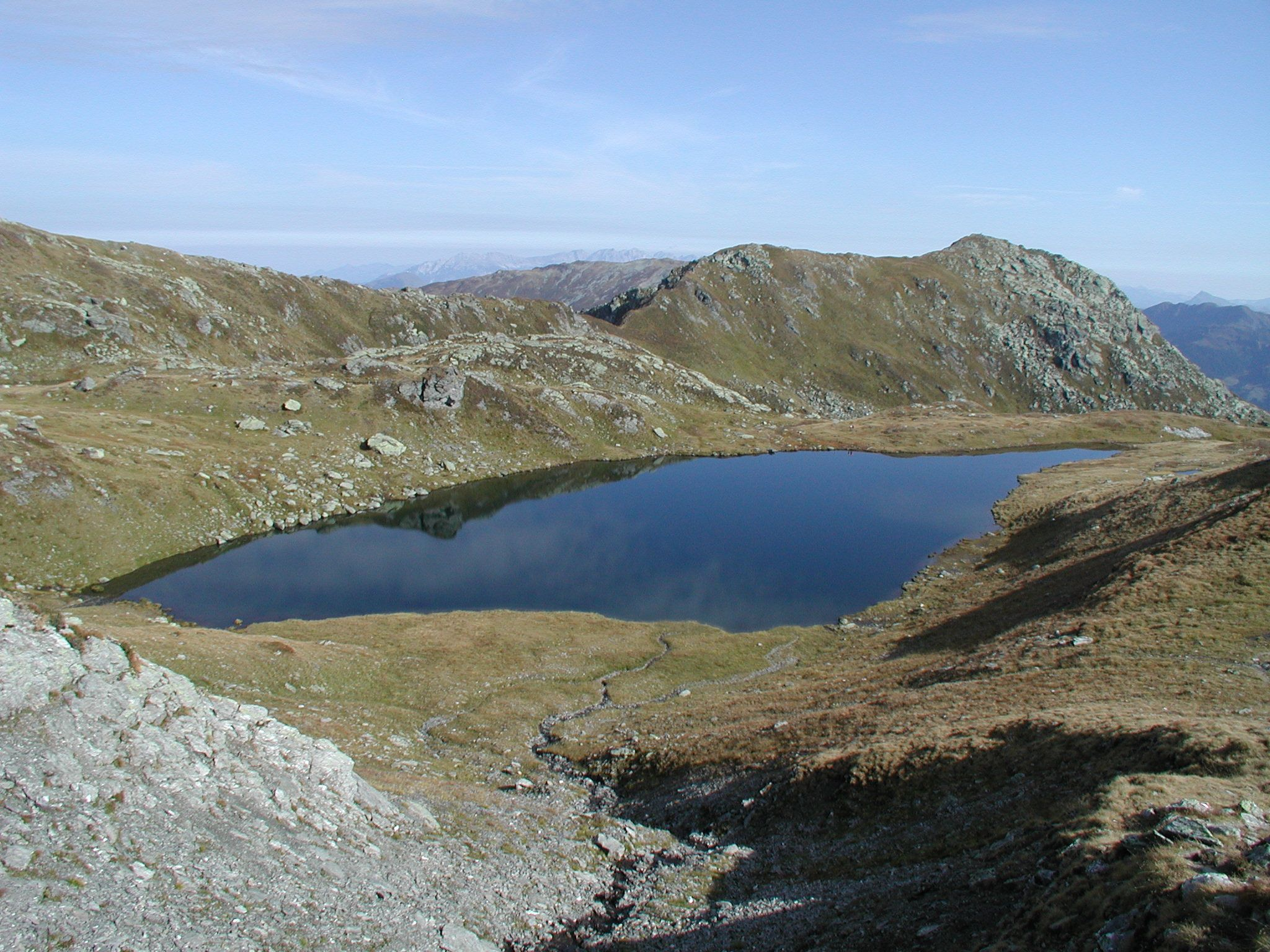
The source region on the Rainkarsee

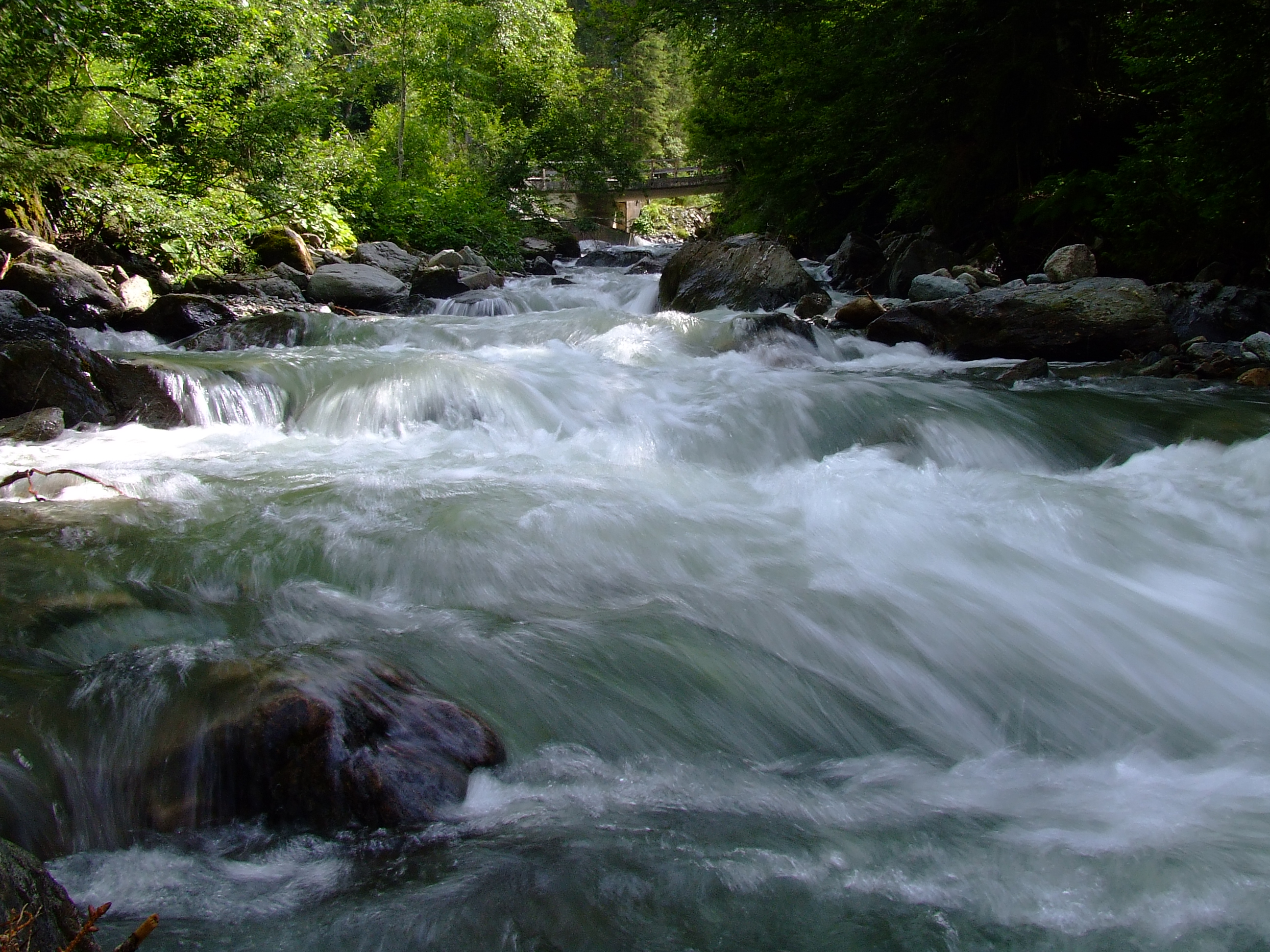
The Ache downstream

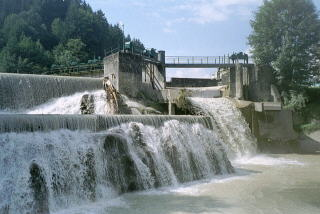
The large weir of Brixentaler Ache near its confluence with the Windauer Ache in Hopfgarten

== High water ==
At the end of July 2006, a severe storm caused enormous damage throughout the entire Windau valley. The flood of the Windauer Ache tore away the stream shoring, bridges and road sections. The investment sum for the restoration - and simultaneous shoring and regulation of the river - amounted to approximately 860,000 euros.
