= Brixen im Thale =

- Municipality
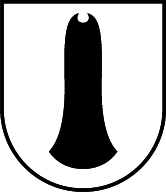
- Coat of arms

- Location within Austria
- Coordinates: 47°27′00″N 12°15′00″E
- Country: Austria
- State: Tyrol
- District: Kitzbühel

Government
  - Mayor: Ernst Huber (ÖVP)

Area
  - Total: 31.41 km^{2} (12.13 sq mi)
- Elevation: 794 m (2,605 ft)

Population (2021)
  - Total: 2,636
  - Density: 83.92/km^{2} (217.4/sq mi)
- Time zone: UTC+1 (CET)
  - Summer (DST): UTC+2 (CEST)
- Postal code: 6364
- Area code: 05334
- Vehicle registration: KB
- Website: www.brixen.tirol.gv.at

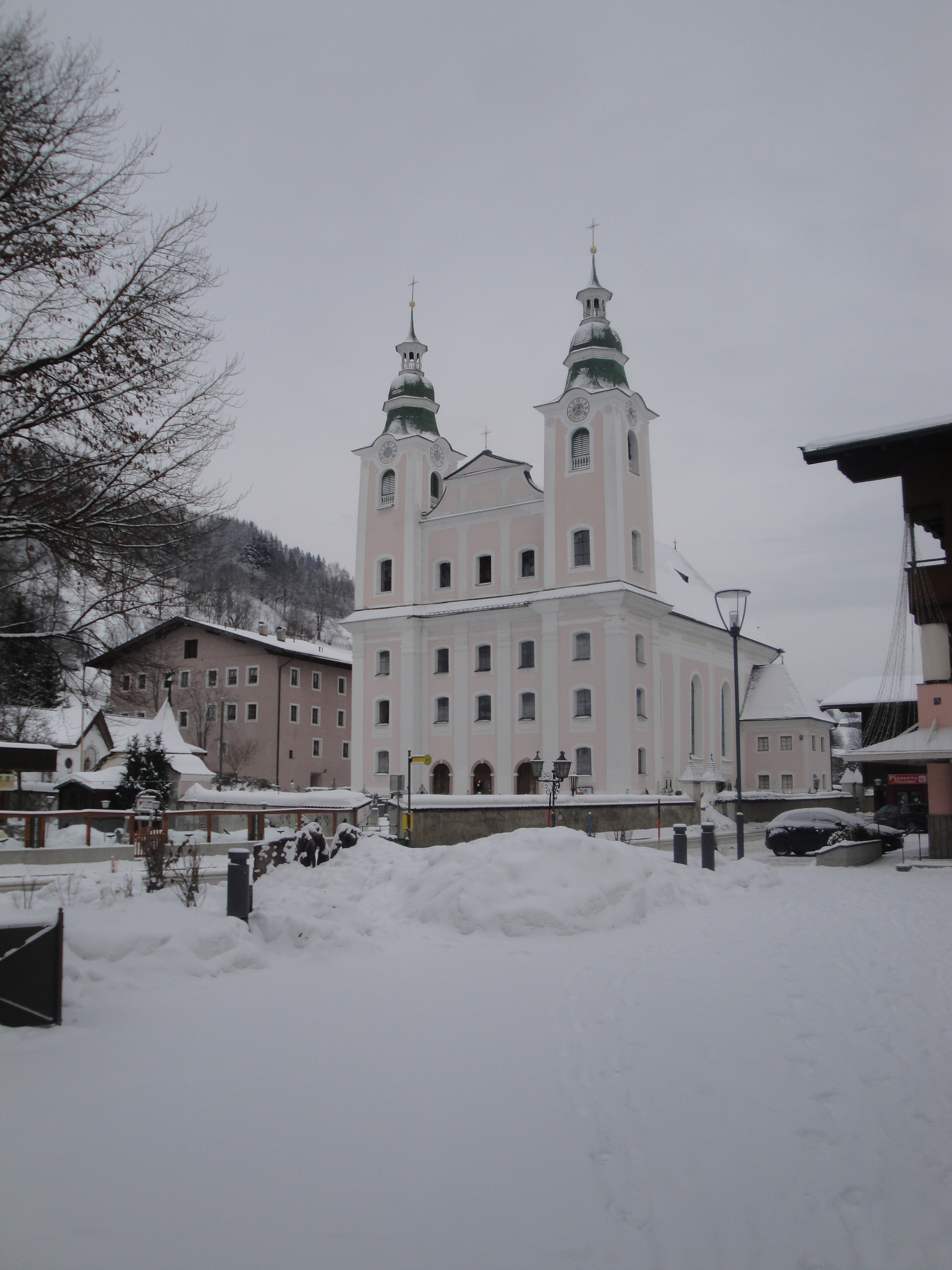
Brixen im Thale

Brixen im Thale is a municipality situated at the highest point of the Brixental valley in the Austrian state of Tyrol. Every year on the Feast of Corpus Christi, the village celebrates the traditional Antlassritt.

== Geography ==
=== Location ===
Brixen im Thale lies in Kitzbühel District about 10 km west of the district town of Kitzbühel at the head of the Brixental at 794 m above sea level, nestling amongst the grass-covered mountains of the Kitzbühel Alps. The highest mountain in the municipality is the Fleiding at 1,892 metres above the Adriatic. North of the village rises the mountain ridge of the Hohe Salve. South of the village are the Nachtsöllberg and the Gaisberg, separated by the valley of the Brixenbach. The slopes north of the municipality (known as Sonnberg or Sonseitn - sunny side) are mainly used for farming and only sparsely covered in conifers. The slopes south of the village (referred to as Schattseitn - shadow side) are covered by spruce forest, apart from a few alpine meadows.

=== Municipal divisions ===
Brixen im Thale consists of the following villages and sub-districts: Achenberg, Brixen-Zentrum, Buchberg, Buchschwent, Feuring, Griesberg, Hof, Lauterbach, Maria-Luisenbad, Ritschberg, Salvenberg, Schön, Sonnberg, Vordermoosen und Winkl.

== Village development ==
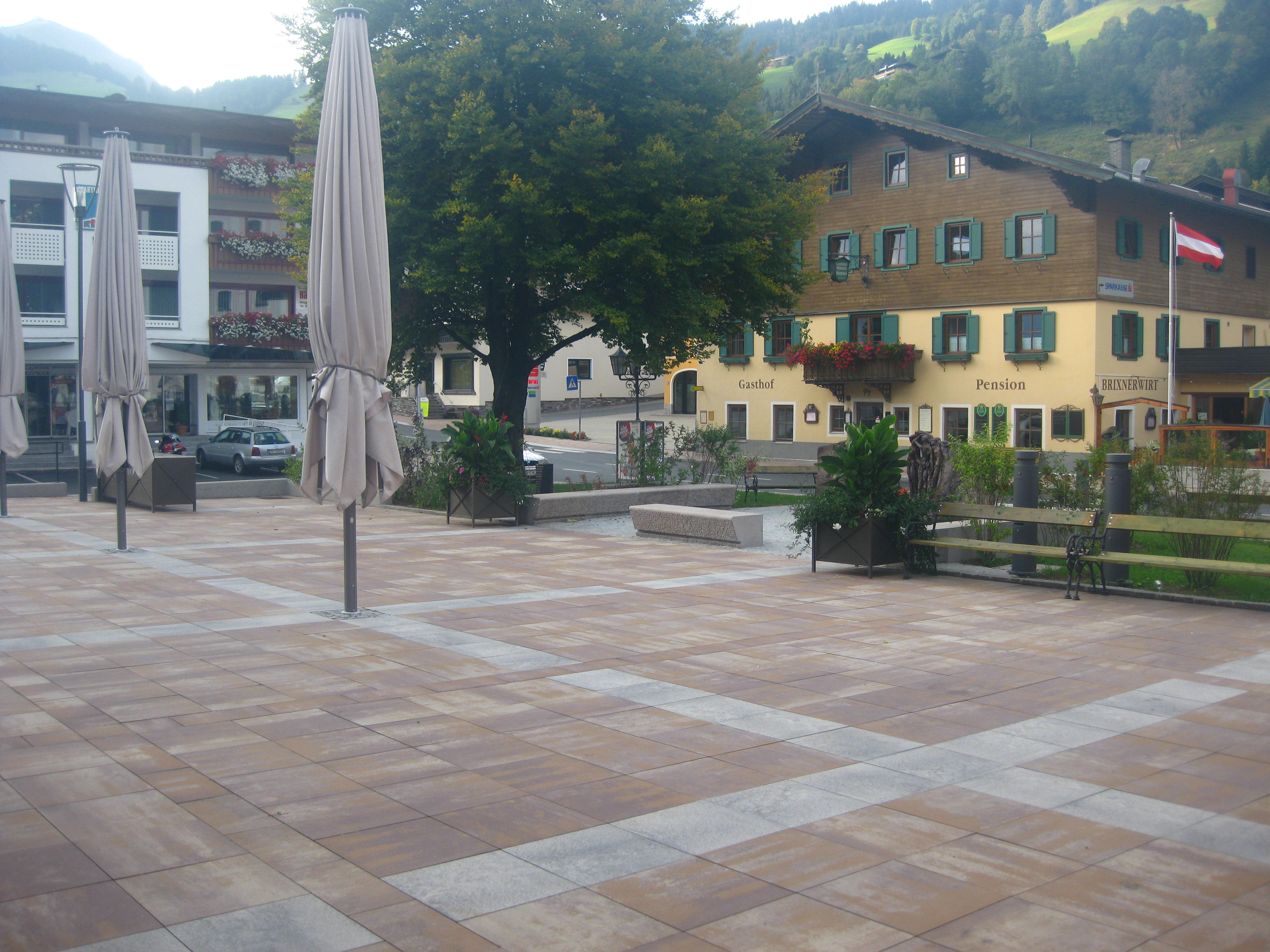
New village square

In 2009 and 2010 the village square in front of the community hall was thoroughly renovated and extended. The cobblestones were replaced and the square enlarged and raised. The fountain was moved to a new site, next to the beech tree, which had to stay where it was. Red and white bricks were used for the cobbles. Seating was built around the fountain and for the bus stop. The road was renewed from the Brixner Höhe/Aschaber to the Brixnerwirt, with the aim of slowing traffic down through the village centre.

Since the ring road was opened in April 2011, quality of life in the village has improved considerably. In the last four years, large homes have been built, especially for local people. The parish encourages newcomers and especially the growth of the economy. in the future other land for building will be made available in the south of the area so that the actual village centre can come more into its own.

The village centre has gondola links to take visitors and locals higher into the mountains towards Hochbrixen in one direction and towards Westendorf in the other. These are particularly busy in winter, when Brixen im Thale becomes a key point in the Ski Welt winter sports circuit.

== History ==
Brixen im Thale has a long and varied history. The Celts first settled the valley and built small villages there, as evidenced by archaeological finds of axes and swords, as well as an urn cemetery.

The name Brixen im Thale appears to be Celtic in origin and indicates that there has always been a settlement here. In the 3rd century A.D., there was a kind of temple, built by the Romans, on the site of the present church.

In 788 A.D., the name Indiculus Arnonis, which means "a church with own fields", was given to the church by Bishop Arno. At that time, it was the only church in the Brixental. It is therefore the oldest parish in the Tyrolean Unterland along with those in of St. Johann in Tirol, Ebbs, Söll, Radfeld and St. Ulrich am Pillersee.

In 1481, a library (the Taz Library) was founded by Wilhelm Taz, who was a teacher and a priest, in Brixen im Thale. It still exists today.

Around 1600, copper was mined; but mining ceased at the end of the 18th century.

On Corpus Christi, the traditional Antlassritt takes place. This is a eucharistic procession by farmers from the towns of Kirchberg in Tirol, Brixen im Thale and Westendorf (Tirol). The Antlassritt commemorates the 30 Years' War in the 17th century, when the villagers of those communities beat back Swedish troops on the Klausenbach river. The farmers' ride to the Klausenkapelle chapel in Kirchberg in Tirol commemorates their victory.

== Population ==
Historical population

Year	Pop.	±%
1869	992	—
1880	1,044	+5.2%
1890	1,083	+3.7%
1900	1,074	−0.8%
1910	1,195	+11.3%

Year	Pop.	±%
1923	1,314	+10.0%
1934	1,446	+10.0%
1939	1,401	−3.1%
1951	1,620	+15.6%
1961	1,707	+5.4%

Year	Pop.	±%
1971	2,011	+17.8%
1981	2,148	+6.8%
1991	2,269	+5.6%
2001	2,574	+13.4%
2011	2,676	+4.0%

== Notable people ==
This list contains some of the notable people who were either born in Brixen im Thale, lived there for a longer time or were in some significant way related to it.

- Matthäus Hetzenauer - Austrian sniper in the 3rd Mountain Division on the Eastern Front of the World War II, who was credited with 345 kills.

== Panorama ==
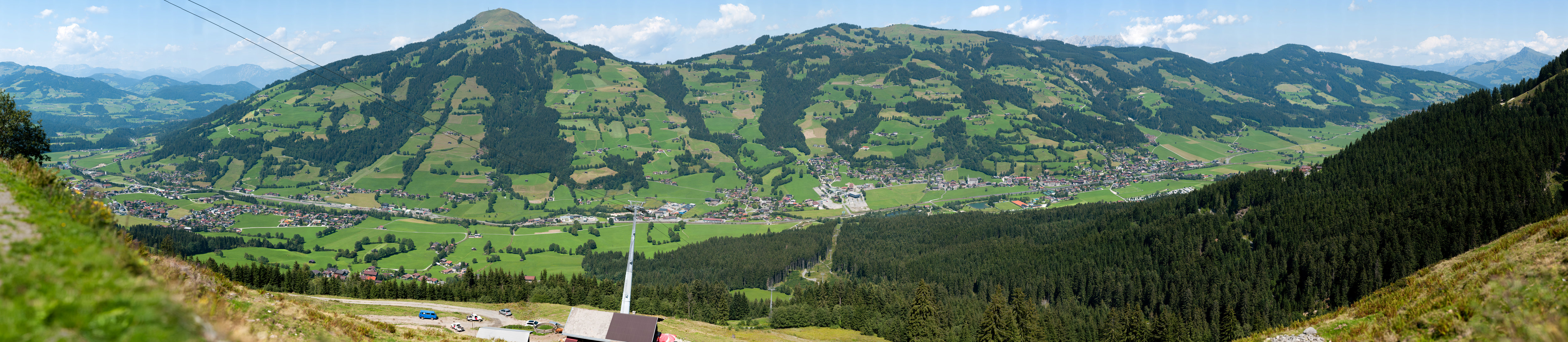
