= Brixental =

Valley in Tyrol, Austria

Coordinates: 47°27′N 12°17′E

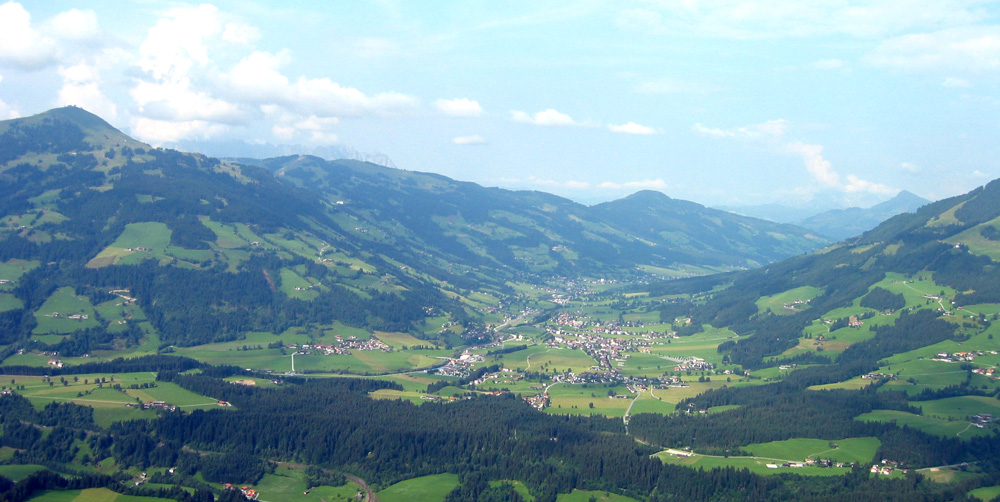
The Brixental looking east

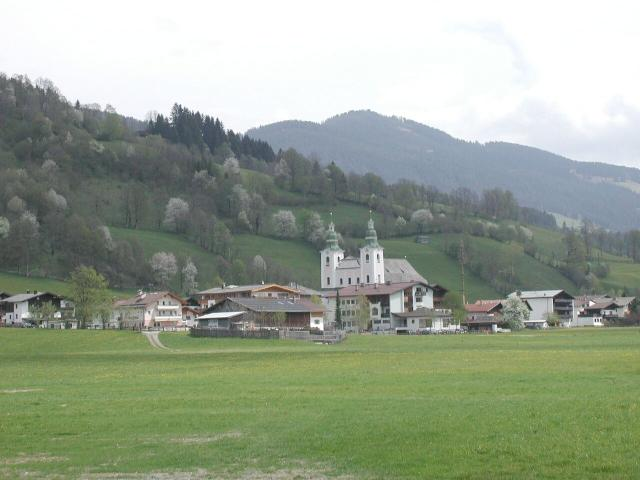
Near Brixen im Thale

The Brixental ("Brixen Valley") is a southeastern side valley of the Tyrolean Lower Inn Valley in Austria with a length of about 30 km (18.6 mi). Near Wörgl (513 m AMSL; 318 mi) the Brixental and Inn valleys meet. The Brixental had belonged to Salzburg since 1312 and first joined Tyrol in 1816 when the new European order came into being.

The valley lies in the Kitzbühel Alps and its main river of the valley is the Brixentaler Ache. Behind a gentle mountain saddle near Brixen im Thale it reaches the ski resort of Kitzbühel, which is also the district capital and lies on the federal road (Bundesstraße) to Salzburg. Since 1875 the Salzburg-Tyrol Railway has also followed the course of the valley.

The landscape of the Brixental is characterised by smooth, mainly wooded mountains. Two peaks almost reach 2,000 metres in height: the Hohe Salve (1,828 m, also called "the Rigi of the Tyrol"), visible from a long way off, and the Gampenkogel (1,957 m).

The main settlement is Hopfgarten im Brixental (623 m), where the valley changes direction by 70°. Other large villages are not found until the upper reaches because, there, the valley floor is wider (see picture): Brixen im Thale (794 m), where several headstreams unite, and especially Kirchberg in Tirol (837 m), where the Spertental joins the Brixental not far from Kitzbühel.

In its lower reaches - between Westendorf and Hopfgarten - the Ache flows through a narrow gorge, through which only the Bundesstraße snakes - the railway line branches away in the so-called Windau bend. Another narrow section is the gully near the village of Itter.

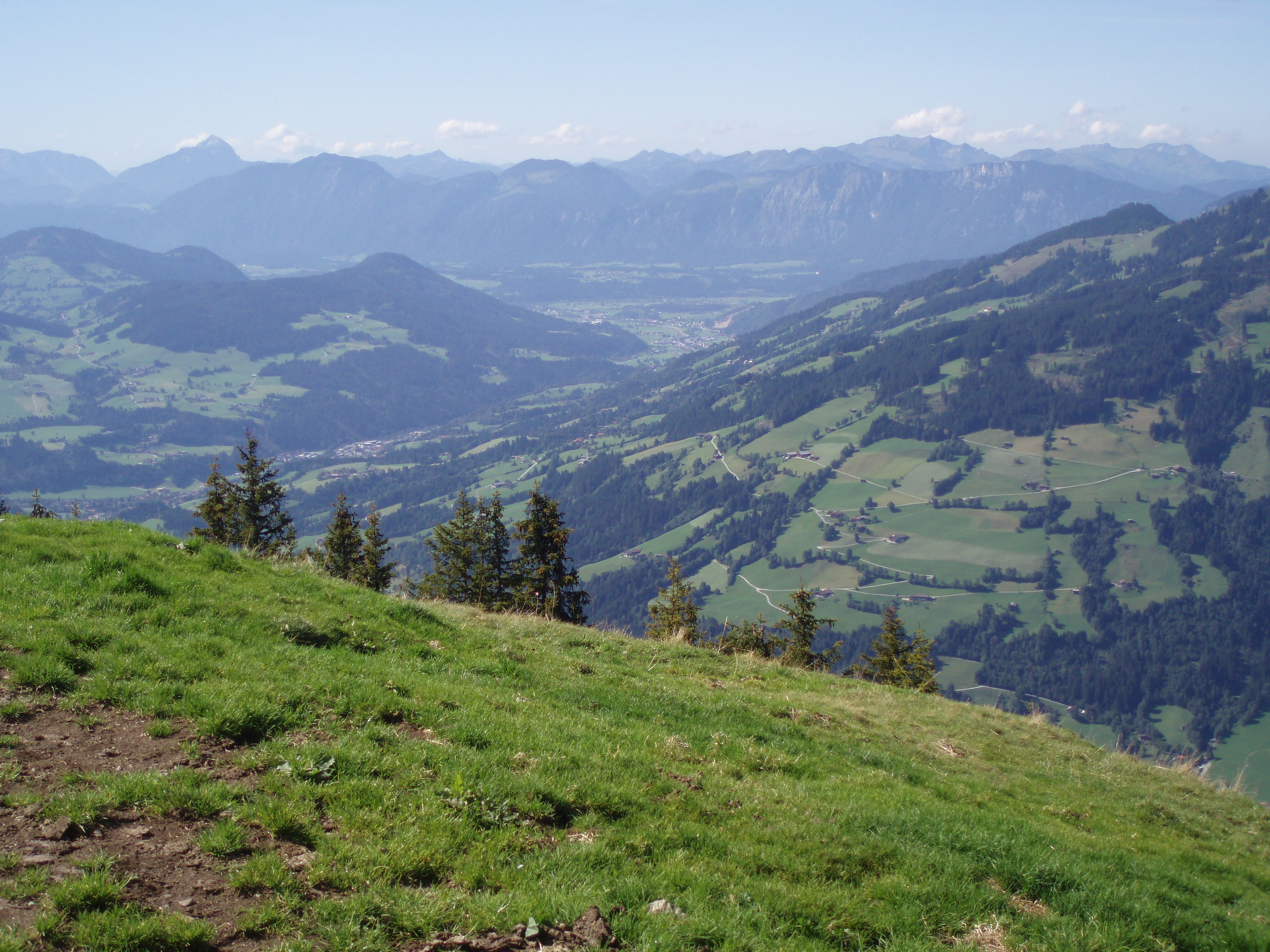
Here the bend of the Brixental valley, near the confluence of the Kelchsau and the Windautalin Hopfgarten, is visible. In the background the junction of the Brixental and the Inn valley can be seen.

Its larger side valleys are (listed from Wörgl upstream):

- in the lower reaches the Nasenbachtal from Söll, the Luechertal (near Bruckhäusl) and the Bruggtal (near Gries);
- the Schönbachtal near Hopfgarten and the two long valleys coming from the south, the Kelchsauer Ache and the Windauer Ache;
- in the wide upper reaches (valley width over 1 km) there are initially only small side streams; not until Brixen do the valleys of the headstreams enter: the Lauterbach, Schleicherbach and Brixenbach. Not far from the saddle towards Kitzbühel the Spertental opens up near Kirchberg, although, orographically it drains towards the north.

The catchment area of the Brixentaler Ache covers about a third of the district of Kitzbühel, most of which is due to the Windauer and Kelchsauer Ache tributaries. The Brixentaler Ache discharges into the Inn in Wörgl.

== Panorama ==
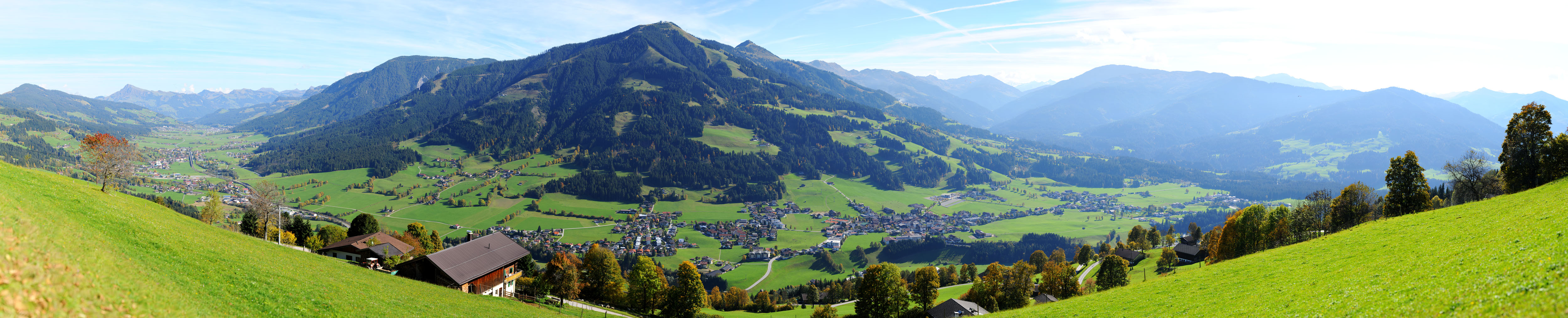
View of the Brixental from the Salvenberg

== See also ==
- Brixen im Thale
- Lauterbach
