= Kröndlhorn =

Mountain in the Kitzbühel Alps, Austria

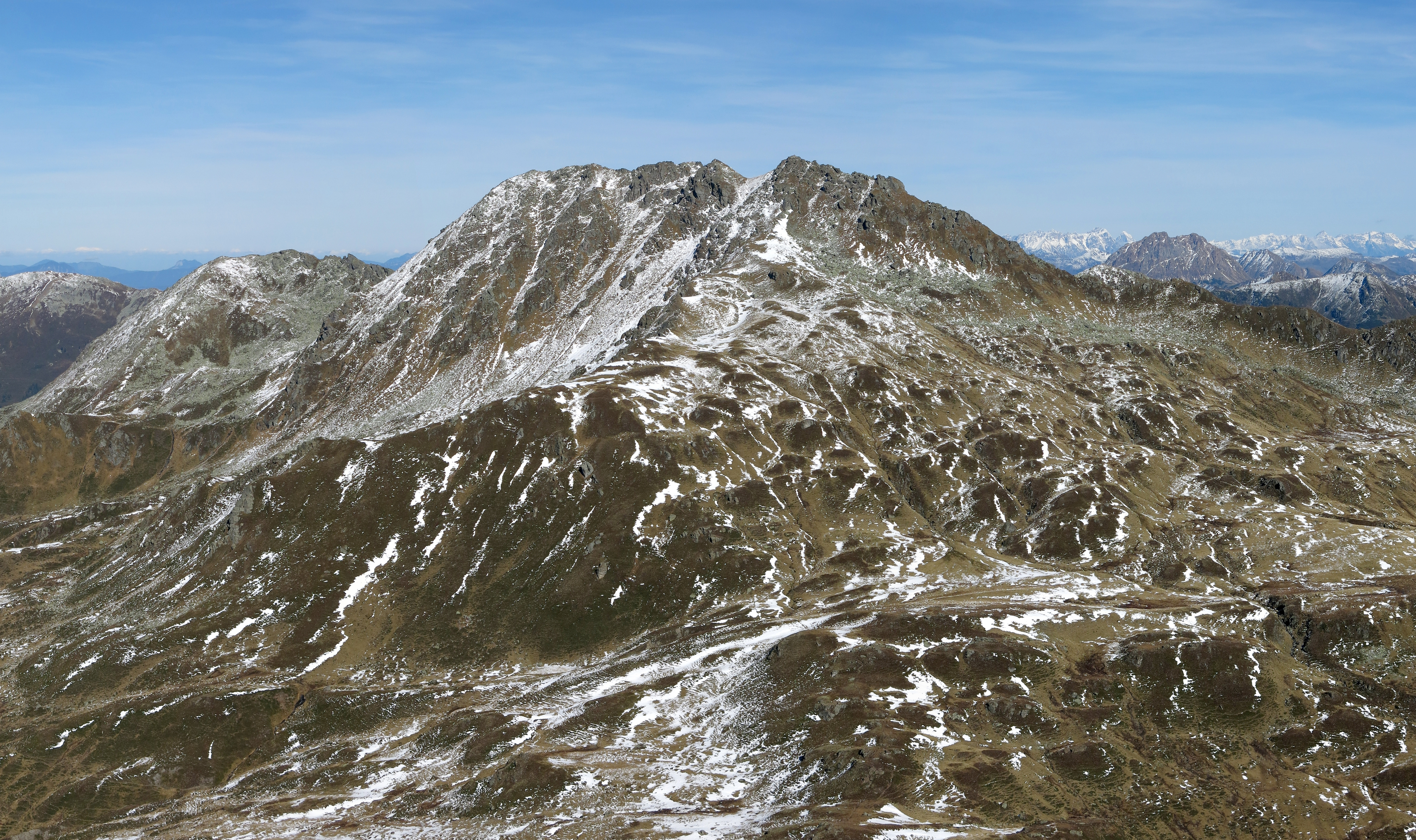
- View of the Kröndlhorn from southwest

Highest point
- Elevation: 2,444 m (AA) (8,018 ft)
- Coordinates: 47°17′54″N 12°09′52″E

Geography
- Location within Austria
- Location: Tyrol and Salzburg, Austria
- Parent range: Kitzbühel Alps

Climbing
- Normal route: From the Windau valley via the Reinkarsee lake and the Kröndlberg

The Kröndlhorn is a 2,444 m above sea level (AA) high mountain in the Kitzbühel Alps in Austria. It is one of the highest mountains on the main crest of the Kitzbühel Alps. The state border between Tyrol and Salzburger Land runs over its summit.

== Location ==
The Kröndlhorn rises north of the Salzach valley, southeast of the Kelchsau valley and southwest of the Windau valley. A secondary ridge to the main crest of the Kitzbühel Alps runs from the summit of the Kröndelhorn northwards in a curve. This ridge surrounds the cirque in which the mountain lake of the Reinkarsee has formed, at a height of 2,134 m. This cirque is the main source region of the Windauer Ache stream.

In front of the summit of the Kröndlhorn to the north is another peak, the Kröndlberg, only four metres lower, which looks like the actual summit when approaching from the north.

== Summit ==
On the summit of the Kröndlhorn is a small chapel that only accommodates two people. It contains a stamp and a summit register. On the interior walls of the chapel obituary notices have been posted for many years.

In fine weather the summit offers a long view to the south into the Pinzgau region and the Reichenspitz Group and the High Tauern and the Krimml Waterfalls.

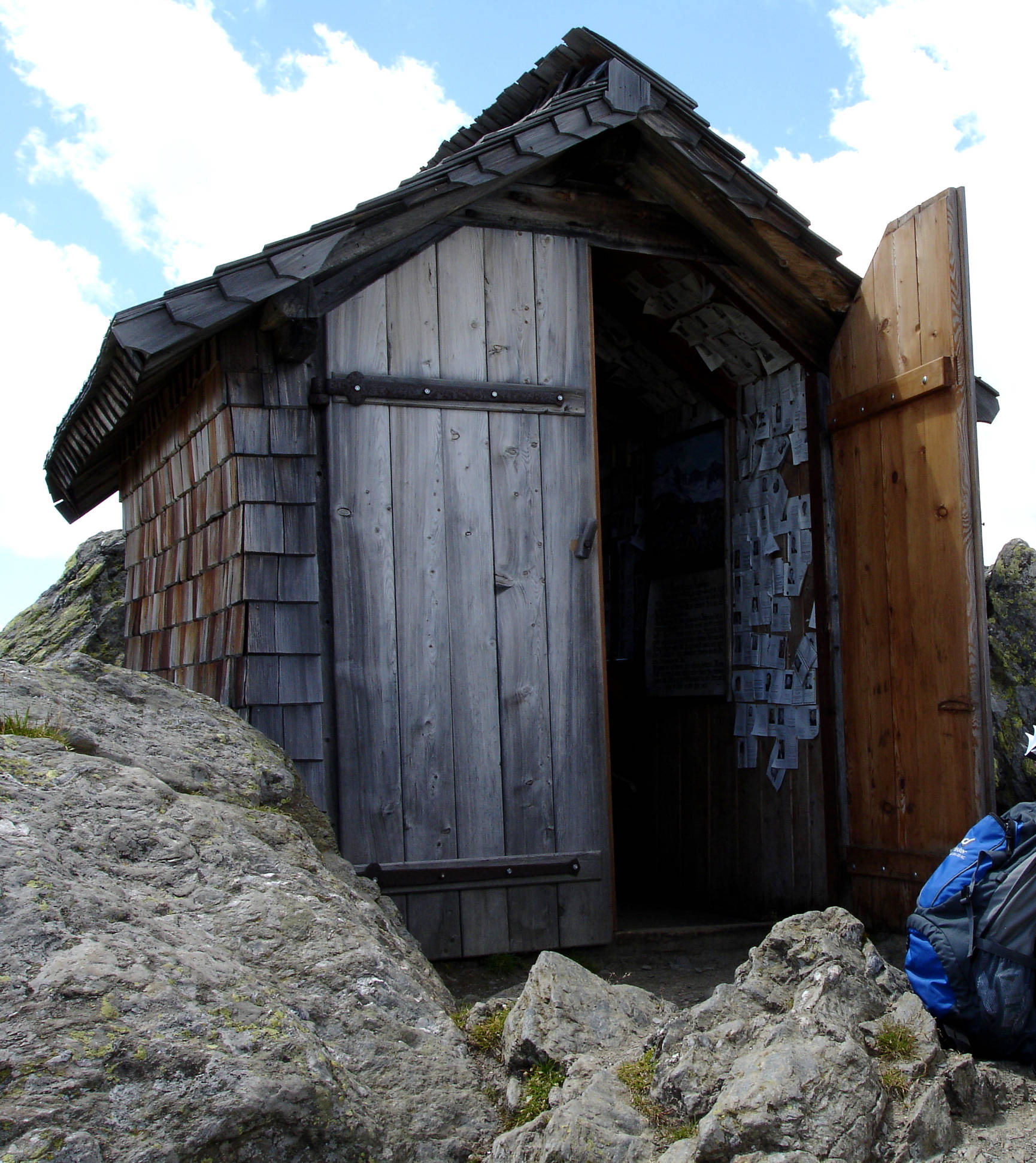
The chapel on the summit

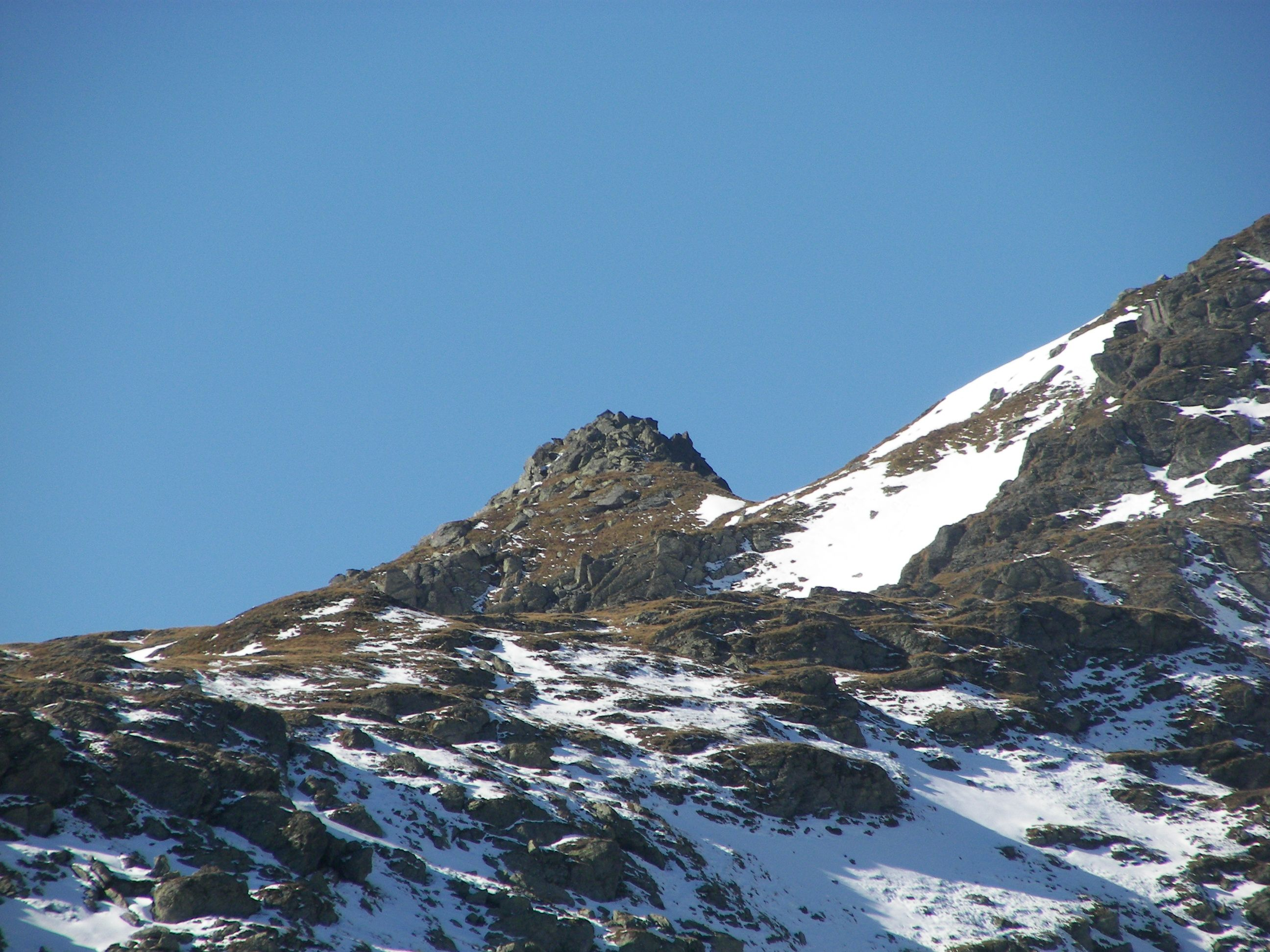
The Kröndlhorn in autumn from the Windau valley ascent

== Use of the mountain ==
Above the tree line the open slopes are used as grazing for sheep, goats, cows and horses. Herds of sheep, in particular, may be seen in summer around the Reinkarsee. A material ropeway runs from Holzlagerplatz to the Rotwand Grundalm. The trails are all signed with tree and ground markers.

== Reinkarsee ==
A scenic high point of an ascent of the Kröndlhorn is the Reinkarsee, which lies at a height of 2,194 m. The area around the lake is a good place to observe sunrises.

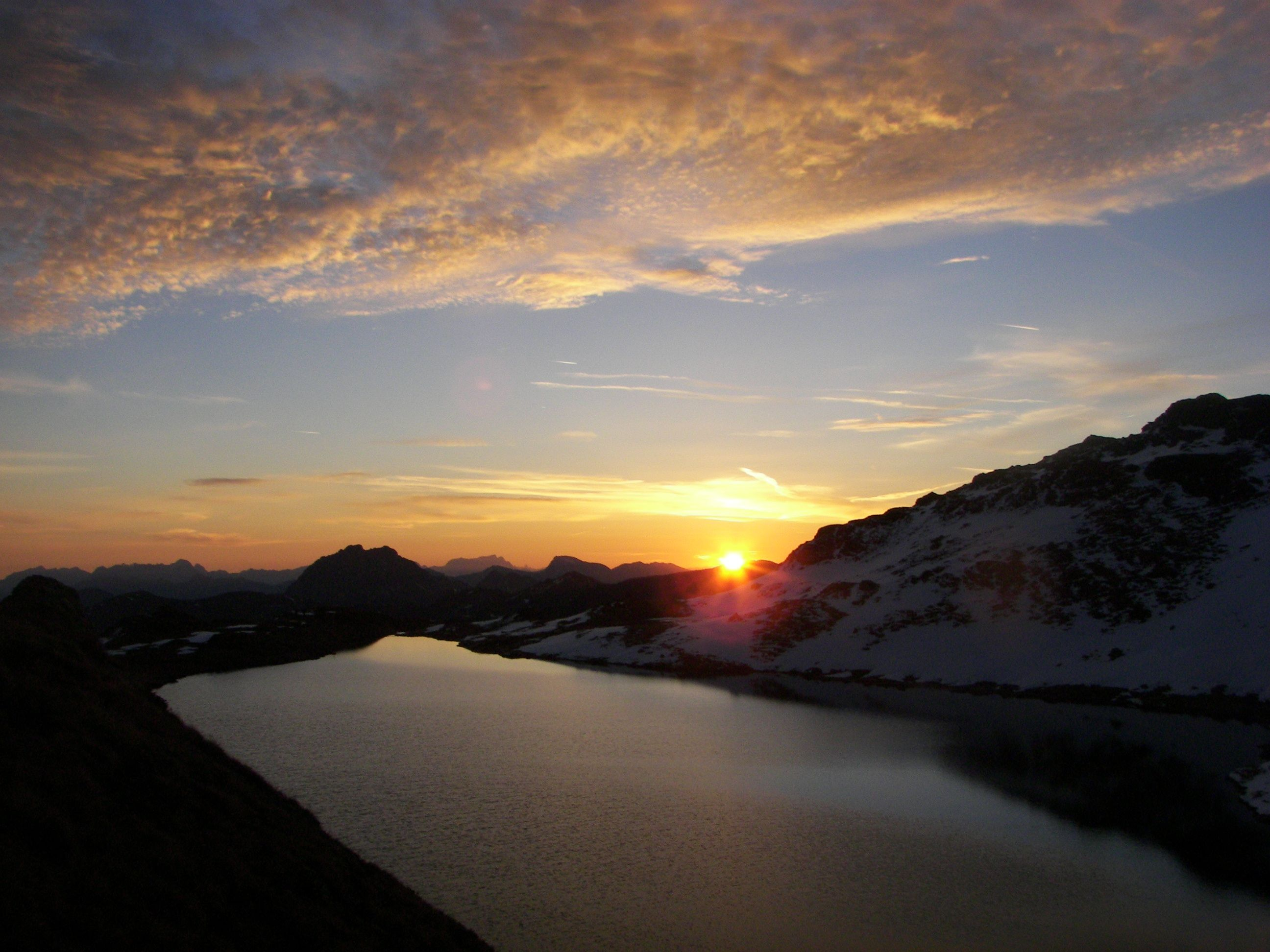
Sunrise

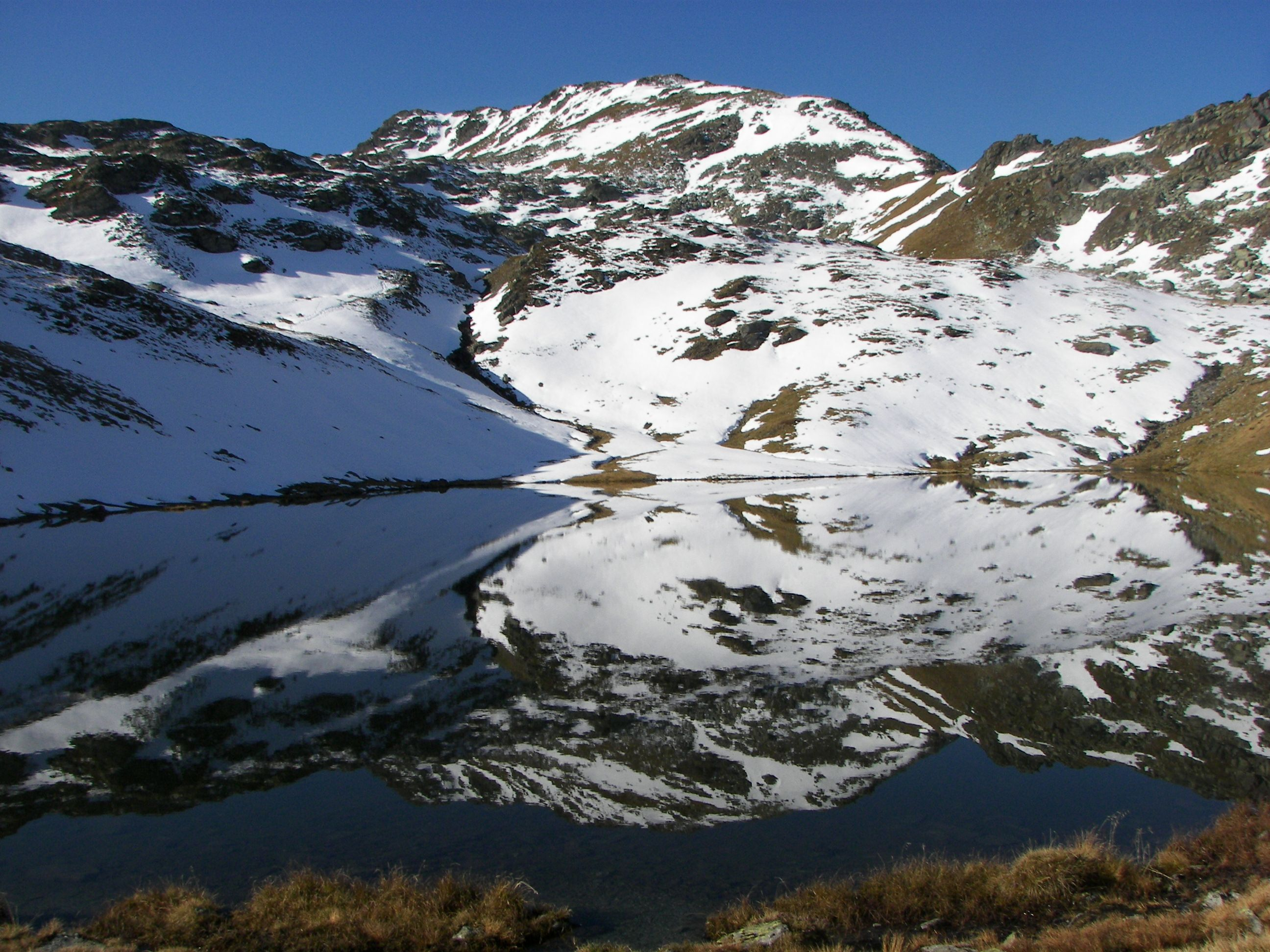
In autumn

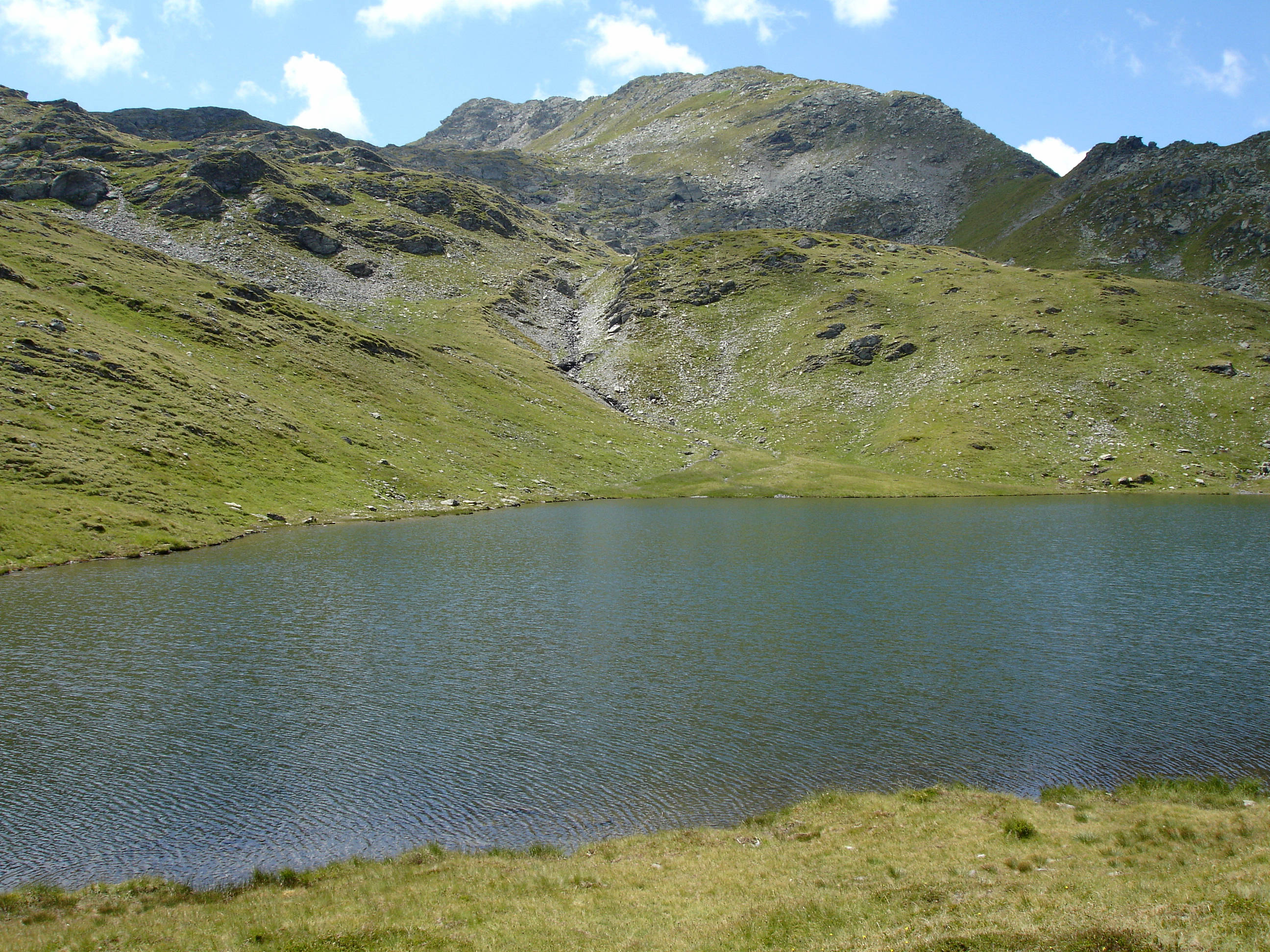
View towards the Kröndlhorn

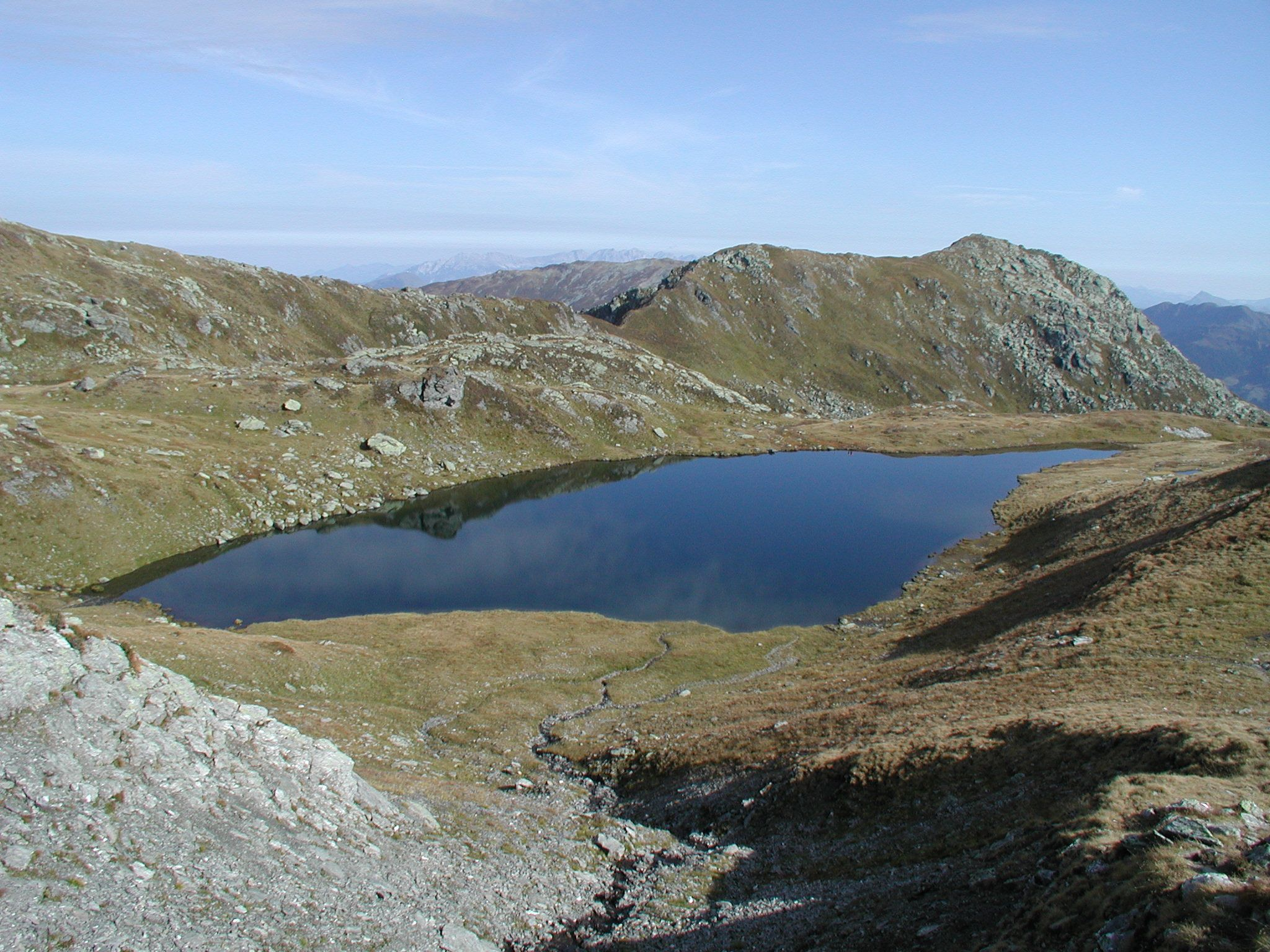
View from the area of the Kröndlhorn summit looking north

== Ascents ==
The most frequently used ascent route is from the Windautal, which may be reached via Hopfgarten im Brixental and Westendorf in the north. Cars can also get to the foot of the mountain on a partly unmetalled toll road. There are parking areas by the Gamskogel Hut, a little way above the valley, and at the Holzlagerplatz (1,297 m) in the valley below the Rotwand Grundalm.

An ascent may be made over two main routes. The technically easier, but longer, way runs from the Baumgartenalm through the Oberkaralm along the southeast face of the Schneegrubenspitze (2,237 m) to the Reinkarsee (2,134 m). The shorter way goes from the car park at Holzlagerplatz and runs steeply through a short section of wood up to the Rotwand Grundalm (1,588 m). From there it continues to the Rotwand Hinttalalm (1,830 m). Next the way crosses the slope 200 to 400 m north of the crest to reach the Reinkarsee. Here the two routes meet and run in a southwesterly direction up to the zum Kröndlberg (2,440 m). From here the route is steep in places and requires sure-footedness to reach the summit some 300 metres further south.

Another ascent approaches from the east through the Trattenbachalm running alongside the Trattenbach stream to the summit.

The peak may also be scaled from the south (Pinzgau) and west (Kelchsau, kurzer Grund). For example, from the New Bamberg Hut in the Kelchsau valley, from which other trails run to the Salzachgeier or the Schafsiedel mountains.

== Sources ==
- Sepp Brandl (2008), Kitzbüheler Alpen. Wildschönau - Hopfgarten - Kirchberg - Fieberbrunn. 50 Touren (in German) (3rd ed.), München: Bergverlag Rother, ISBN 978-3-7633-4134-4
- ÖK 50 mit Wegmarkierungen
