= Kirchbichl =

- Municipality
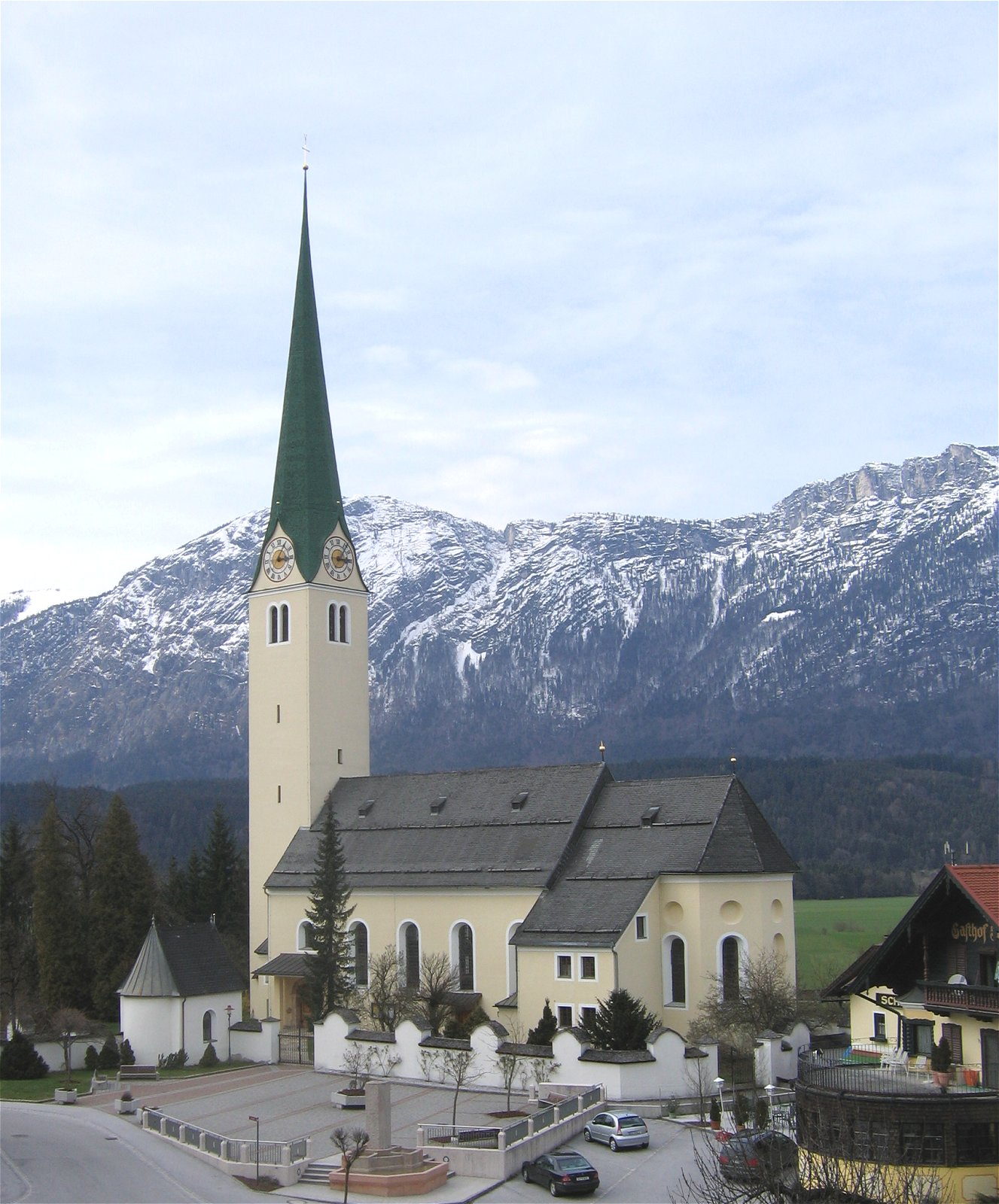
- Kirchbichl parish church

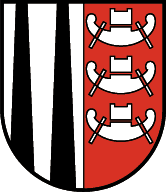
- Coat of arms

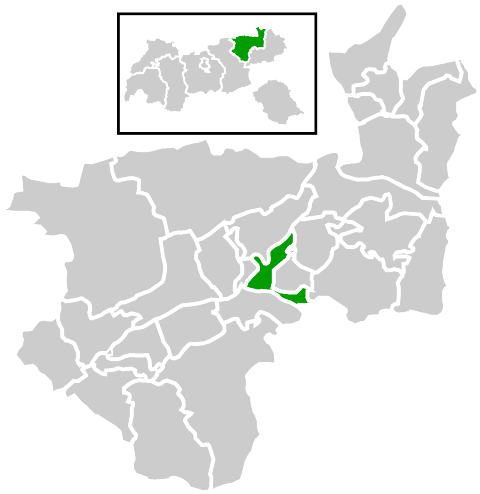
- Location within Kufstein district

- Location within Austria
- Coordinates: 47°31′00″N 12°04′00″E
- Country: Austria
- State: Tyrol
- District: Kufstein

Government
  - Mayor: Herbert Rieder (SPÖ)

Area
  - Total: 14.97 km^{2} (5.78 sq mi)
- Elevation: 515 m (1,690 ft)

Population (2018-01-01)
  - Total: 5,855
  - Density: 391.1/km^{2} (1,013/sq mi)
- Time zone: UTC+1 (CET)
  - Summer (DST): UTC+2 (CEST)
- Postal code: 6322
- Area code: 05332
- Vehicle registration: KU
- Website: www.kirchbichl.at

Kirchbichl is a municipality in the Kufstein District in the Austrian state of Tyrol located 10 km south of Kufstein and 3 km northeast above Wörgl. It has six parts and its main source of income is cement industry.

== Climate ==
Climate data for Kirchbichl (1971–2000)
Month	Jan	Feb	Mar	Apr	May	Jun	Jul	Aug	Sep	Oct	Nov	Dec	Year
Record high °C (°F)	16.0 (60.8)	18.2 (64.8)	25.0 (77.0)	26.8 (80.2)	31.0 (87.8)	35.4 (95.7)	36.1 (97.0)	33.8 (92.8)	29.0 (84.2)	27.0 (80.6)	24.2 (75.6)	19.0 (66.2)	36.1 (97.0)
Mean daily maximum °C (°F)	2.1 (35.8)	4.6 (40.3)	9.8 (49.6)	13.9 (57.0)	19.2 (66.6)	21.2 (70.2)	23.3 (73.9)	23.2 (73.8)	19.6 (67.3)	14.6 (58.3)	7.2 (45.0)	2.7 (36.9)	13.5 (56.3)
Daily mean °C (°F)	−2.2 (28.0)	−0.5 (31.1)	3.8 (38.8)	7.8 (46.0)	12.9 (55.2)	15.5 (59.9)	17.4 (63.3)	17.1 (62.8)	13.5 (56.3)	8.7 (47.7)	2.7 (36.9)	−1.2 (29.8)	8.0 (46.4)
Mean daily minimum °C (°F)	−5.4 (22.3)	−4.1 (24.6)	−0.5 (31.1)	2.9 (37.2)	7.3 (45.1)	10.5 (50.9)	12.4 (54.3)	12.4 (54.3)	9.2 (48.6)	4.9 (40.8)	−0.3 (31.5)	−4.0 (24.8)	3.8 (38.8)
Record low °C (°F)	−24.2 (−11.6)	−19.8 (−3.6)	−18.6 (−1.5)	−6.8 (19.8)	−4.3 (24.3)	0.2 (32.4)	3.8 (38.8)	0.0 (32.0)	−0.5 (31.1)	−6.0 (21.2)	−18.8 (−1.8)	−20.2 (−4.4)	−24.2 (−11.6)
Average precipitation mm (inches)	73.9 (2.91)	62.0 (2.44)	76.3 (3.00)	72.7 (2.86)	95.7 (3.77)	140.3 (5.52)	158.0 (6.22)	142.4 (5.61)	90.8 (3.57)	64.5 (2.54)	81.0 (3.19)	77.6 (3.06)	1,135.2 (44.69)
Average snowfall cm (inches)	25.5 (10.0)	27.1 (10.7)	17.3 (6.8)	3.1 (1.2)	0.0 (0.0)	0.0 (0.0)	0.0 (0.0)	0.0 (0.0)	0.0 (0.0)	0.0 (0.0)	11.7 (4.6)	23.8 (9.4)	108.5 (42.7)
Average precipitation days (≥ 1.0 mm)	9.7	8.2	10.9	11.3	12.1	15.2	15.0	14.3	10.3	9.0	10.2	10.5	136.7
Average relative humidity (%) (at 14:00)	71.2	61.5	53.0	49.0	48.5	54.0	53.7	55.2	56.5	57.9	67.5	75.5	58.6
Mean monthly sunshine hours	78.6	104.1	135.5	147.8	190.7	169.9	206.0	206.1	163.1	143.2	83.4	67.4	1,695.8
Percentage possible sunshine	32.4	40.0	41.5	41.2	45.2	39.4	47.4	51.8	48.6	47.4	33.3	29.3	41.5
Source: Central Institute for Meteorology and Geodynamics

== Population ==
Historical population
Year	Pop.	±%
1869	1,259	—
1880	1,330	+5.6%
1890	1,892	+42.3%
1900	2,510	+32.7%
1910	3,028	+20.6%
1923	3,126	+3.2%
1934	3,456	+10.6%
1939	3,549	+2.7%
1951	3,914	+10.3%
1961	4,064	+3.8%
1971	4,689	+15.4%
1981	4,784	+2.0%
1991	4,960	+3.7%
2001	5,060	+2.0%
2013	5,359	+5.9%
