= Gottfried Lumper =

German patristic writer (1747–1800)

Gottfried Lumper (6 February 1747 – 8 March 1800 (Hefele says 1801)) was a German Benedictine patristic writer.

== Life ==
Lumper was born at Füssen in Bavaria. At an early age, he commenced his education at the abbey school, received in the course of time the habit of the order, made his solemn profession in 1764, and was ordained priest in 1771. After this, he never left the Abbey of St. George at Villingen in the Black Forest except for occasional assistance in the sacred ministry.

He was appointed director of the gymnasium, and professor of church history and dogmatic theology. Later he was made prior to his monastery.

== Works ==
All his spare time was employed in the study of early Christian literature. His major work was "Historia theologico-critica de vita, scriptis atque doctrina SS. Patrum aliorumque scriptorum eccl. trium priorum sæculorum", which was published in thirteen volumes at Augsburg between 1783 and 1789.

Smaller works were:

- A translation of "Historia religionis in usum prælectionum catholicarum" of Matthew Schröckh, of which two editions appeared at Augsburg in 1788 and 1790;
- two works in German, "Die römisch-kath. hl. Messe in deutscher Sprache", with various additional prayers (Ulm, 1784), and "Der Christ in der Fasten, d. i. die Fasten-Evangelia nach dem Buchstaben und sittlichen Sinne" (Ulm, 1786).

He also assisted in the publication of the periodical "Nova Bibliotheca Eccl. Friburgensis".
