= Hopfgarten im Brixental =

- Municipality
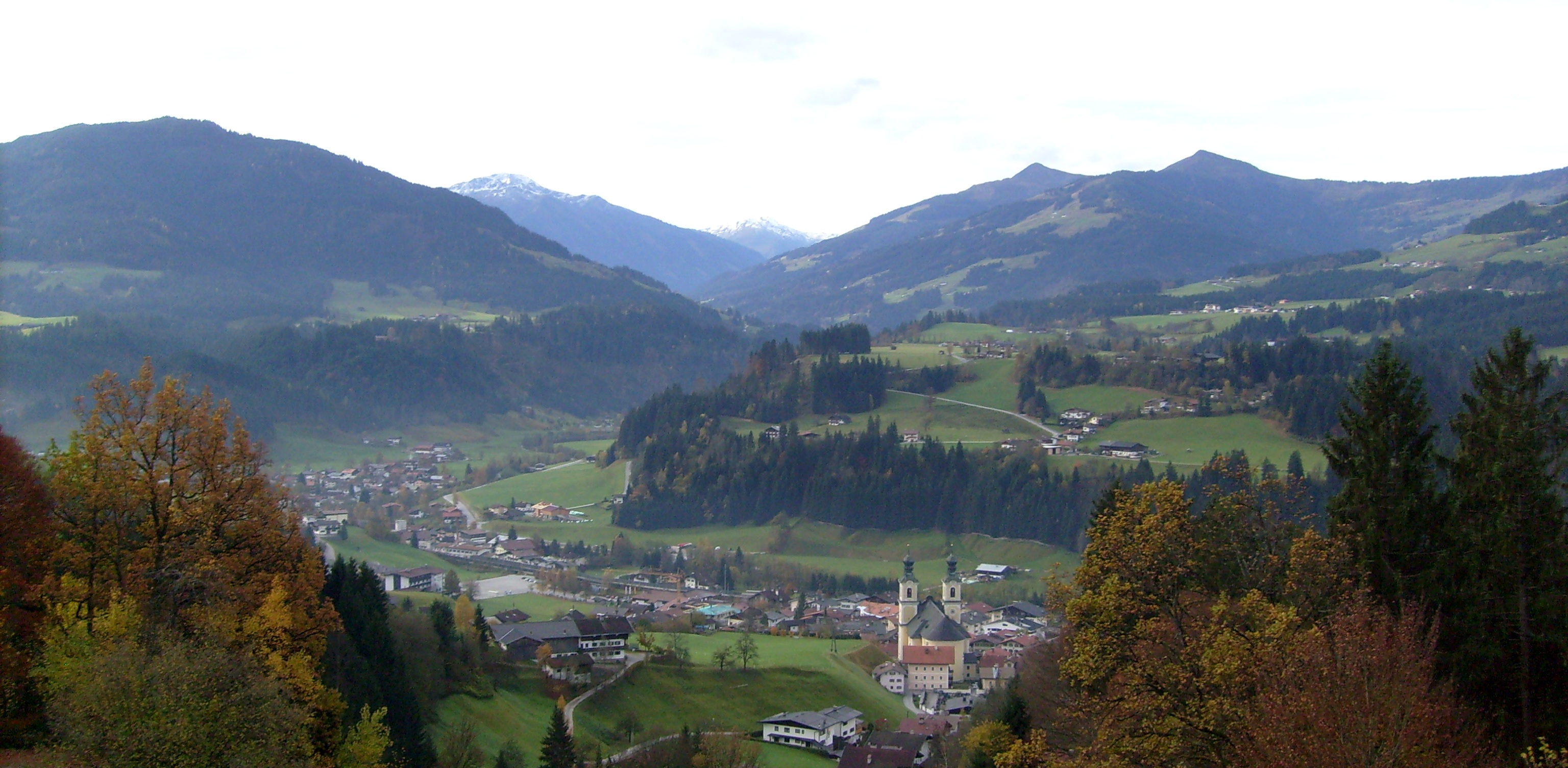

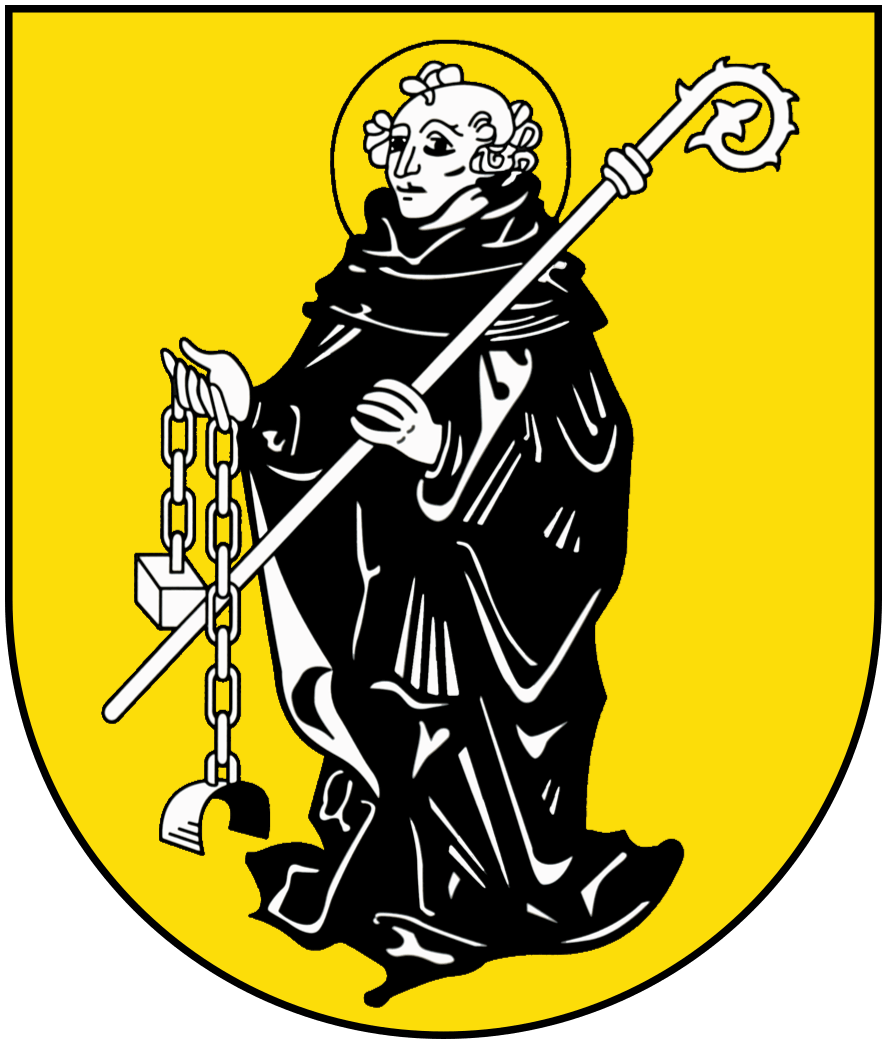
- Coat of arms

- Location within Austria
- Coordinates: 47°27′00″N 12°10′00″E
- Country: Austria
- State: Tyrol
- District: Kitzbühel

Government
  - Mayor: Paul Sieberer (ÖVP)

Area
  - Total: 166.54 km^{2} (64.30 sq mi)
- Elevation: 622 m (2,041 ft)

Population (2020)
  - Total: 5,630
  - Density: 33.8/km^{2} (87.6/sq mi)
- Time zone: UTC+1 (CET)
  - Summer (DST): UTC+2 (CEST)
- Postal code: 6361
- Area code: 05335
- Vehicle registration: KB
- Website: www.hopfgarten.tirol.gv.at

Hopfgarten im Brixental is a market town in the Austrian state of Tyrol in the Kitzbühel district. It is located at an elevation of 622 m above sea level. With an area of 166.57 km² it is the largest municipality in the district, and among the largest in Tyrol.

== Population ==
Historical population
Year	Pop.	±%
1869	2,757	—
1880	2,769	+0.4%
1890	2,790	+0.8%
1900	2,844	+1.9%
1910	3,197	+12.4%
1923	3,062	−4.2%
1934	3,339	+9.0%
1939	3,247	−2.8%
1951	3,909	+20.4%
1961	4,163	+6.5%
1971	4,799	+15.3%
1981	4,952	+3.2%
1991	5,196	+4.9%
2001	5,266	+1.3%
2011	5,544	+5.3%

== Tourism ==
It is a popular place for all levels of skier with a variety of slopes ranging from black slopes for expert skiers to nursery slopes for beginners, and featuring a ski school.

== Notable people ==
- Andreas Benedict Feilmoser, theologian

== Panorama ==
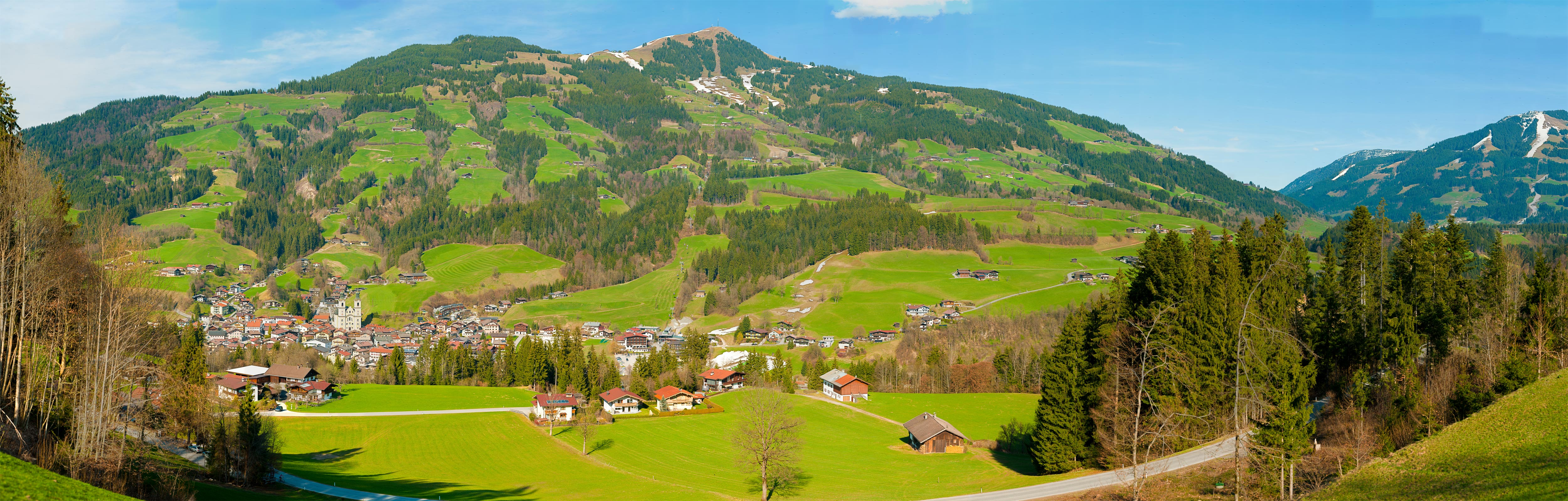
