= Kundl =

- Municipality
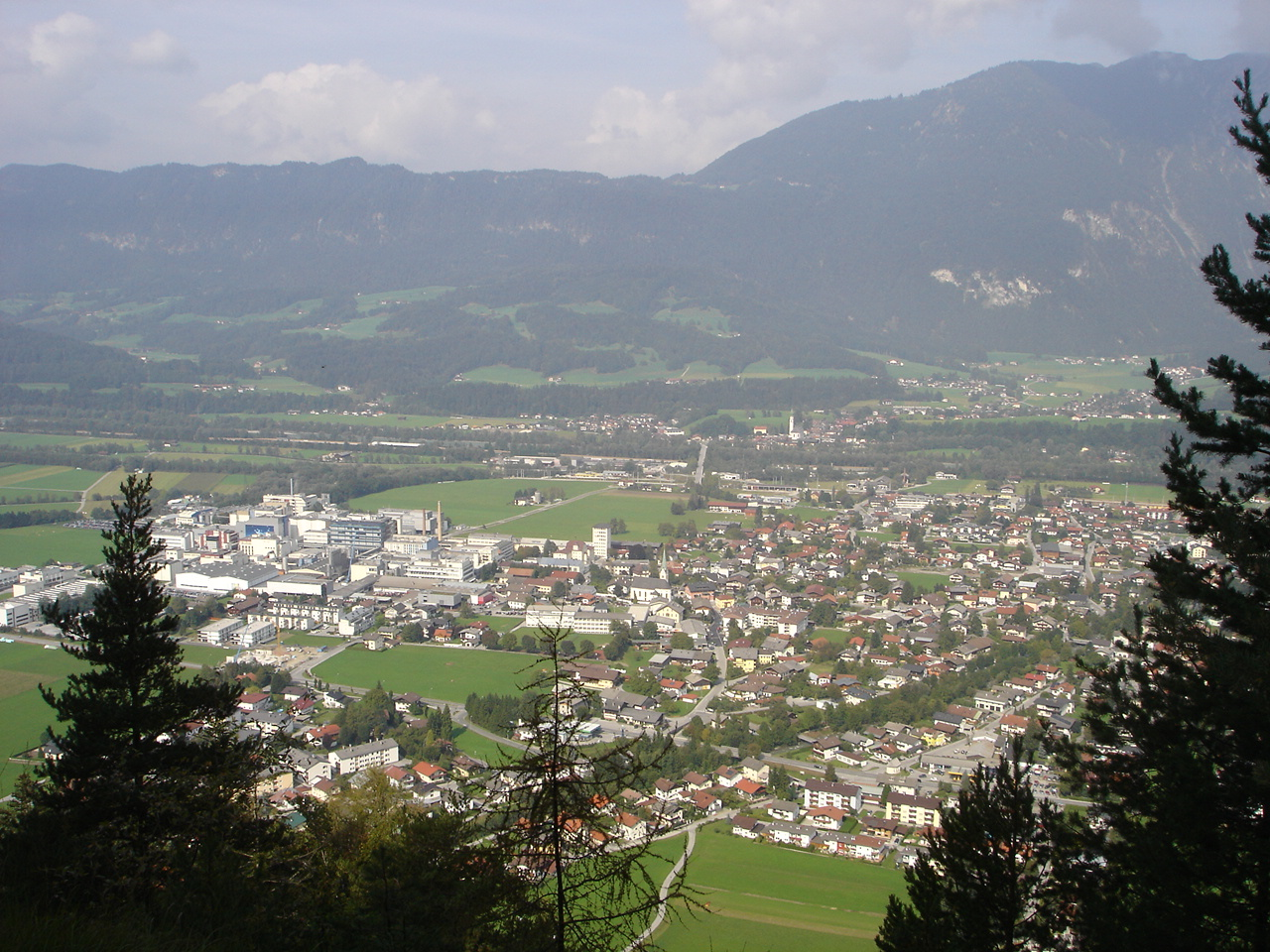
- Kundl

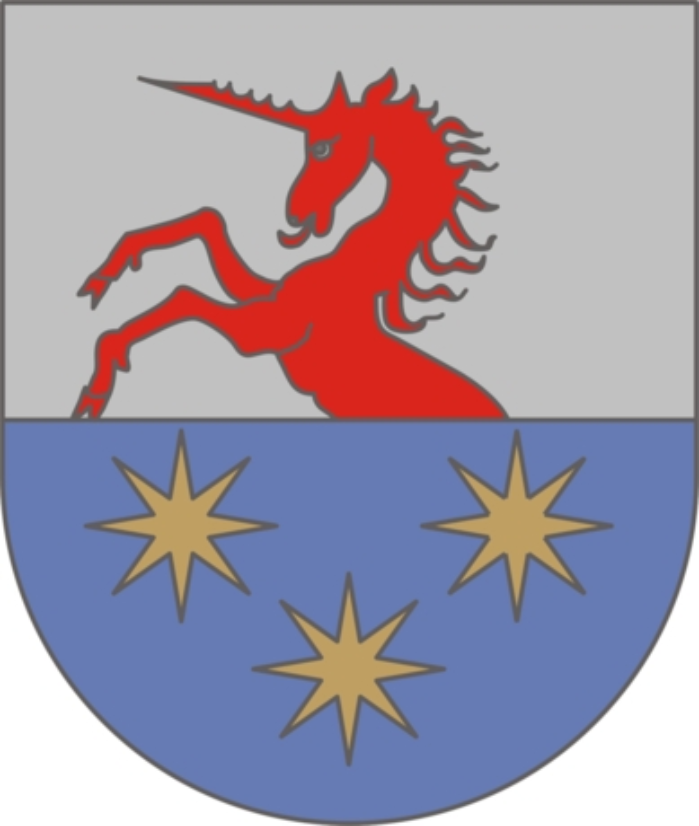
- Coat of arms

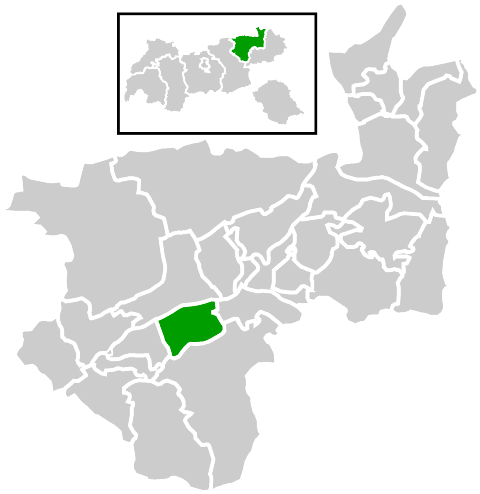
- Location within Kufstein district

- Location within Austria
- Coordinates: 47°28′00″N 11°59′00″E
- Country: Austria
- State: Tyrol
- District: Kufstein

Government
  - Mayor: Anton Hoflacher (SPÖ)

Area
  - Total: 21.94 km^{2} (8.47 sq mi)
- Elevation: 526 m (1,726 ft)

Population (2021)
  - Total: 4,762
  - Density: 217.0/km^{2} (562.1/sq mi)
- Time zone: UTC+1 (CET)
  - Summer (DST): UTC+2 (CEST)
- Postal code: 6250
- Area code: 05338
- Vehicle registration: KU
- Website: www.kundl.tirol.gv.at

Kundl is a market town in the Kufstein district in the Austrian state of Tyrol.

== Geography ==
Kundl is situated 7.70 km west of Wörgl as well as 18.30 km southwest of Kufstein at the southern side of the Inn River and is made up of 4 parts, namely Kundl, Liesfeld (in the north), Saulueg (in the south) and St. Leonhard (in the west).

=== Neighbouring municipalities ===
Breitenbach am Inn, Radfeld, Wörgl, Wildschönau

== History ==
Eastward of Kundl some cremation graves with other remains were found which dated from the La Tène Culture and are now publicly exhibited in the Landesmuseum Ferdinandeum in Innsbruck.

Kundl was first mentioned in a directory by bishop Arno of Salzburg in 788 under the name ad Quantalas, which means at the white river. This should also be the origin of the current name of the market town. In 1213 the noble line of the Kummersbrucker resided in the fortress of Kundl, of which nowadays only the ruins remain. In the 15th and 16th century the mining gained importance and some current street names (e.g. Hüttstraße, Schieferrollstraße) still bear evidence of that.

In 1658 Bartlmä Plank founded a brewery which produced the Kundler Bier. This brewery was converted into a pharmaceutical plant, the Biochemie Kundl, in 1946 nowadays Sandoz.

== Nowadays ==
Due to the settlements of several companies in the 1950s, the village became a commuter community. The most well- known companies in Kundl are probably the pharmaceutical company Sandoz (former: Biochemie), the tractor factory Lindner and the timber factory Pfeifer.

In the summer a lot of tourists visit Kundl and stroll through the picturesque gorge of Kundl, in German called Kundler Klamm, which connects Kundl with the valley of Wildschoenau.

== Population ==
Historical population
Year	Pop.	±%
1869	865	—
1880	911	+5.3%
1890	920	+1.0%
1900	1,183	+28.6%
1910	1,443	+22.0%
1923	1,438	−0.3%
1934	1,765	+22.7%
1939	1,934	+9.6%
1951	2,121	+9.7%
1961	2,508	+18.2%
1971	3,089	+23.2%
1981	3,267	+5.8%
1991	3,468	+6.2%
2001	3,716	+7.2%
2013	4,034	+8.6%

== Miscellaneous ==
- During the Second World War, the bronze statues of the emperor Maximilian I, which are now on display at the Hofkirche, Innsbruck, were kept in a cave in Kundl.
- In 1951 the two chemists Hans Margreiter and Ernst Brandl developed Penicillin V in Kundl and from this time on the drug could be administered orally.

== Gallery ==
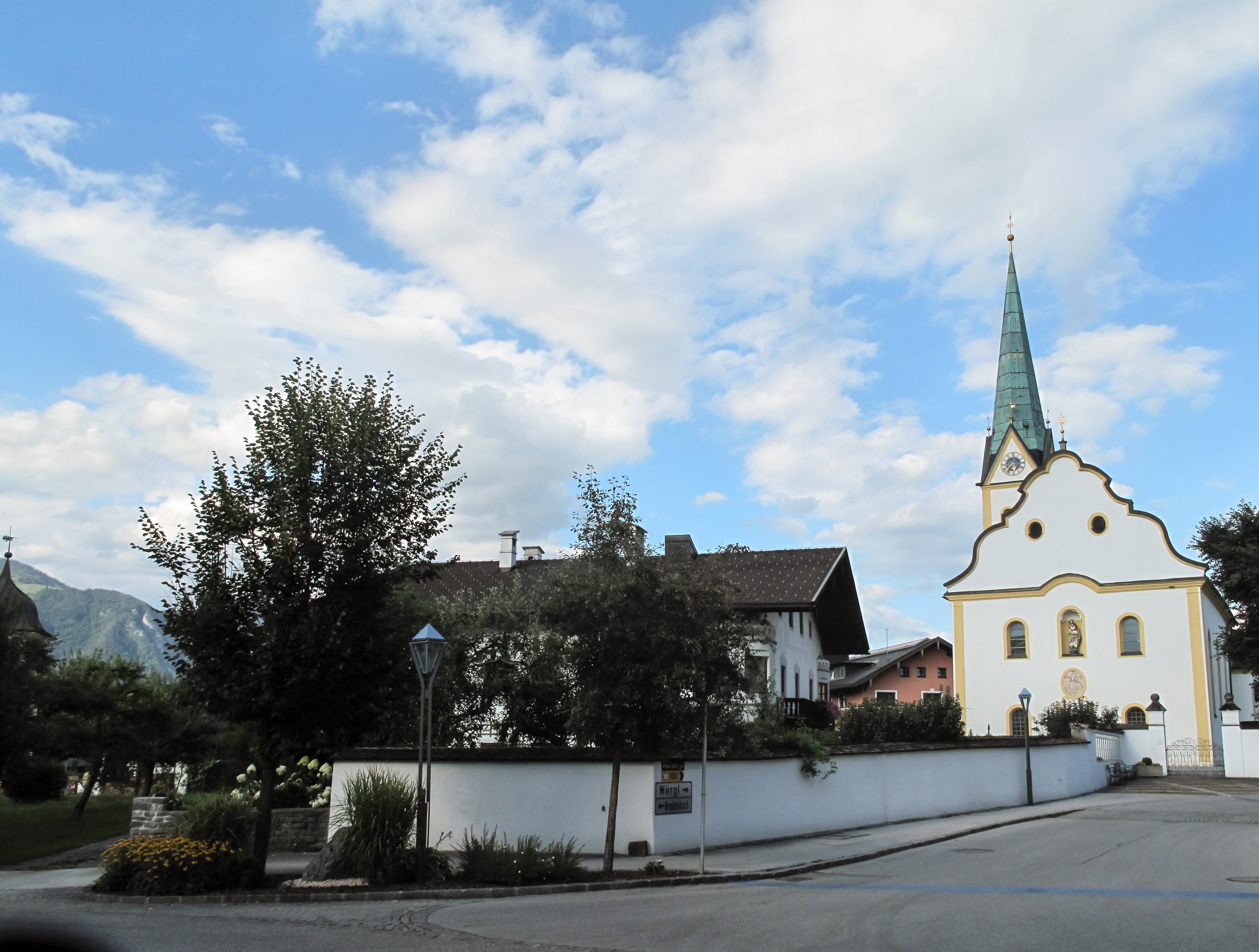
Kundl, church: Katholische Pfarrkriche Mariä Himmelfahrt

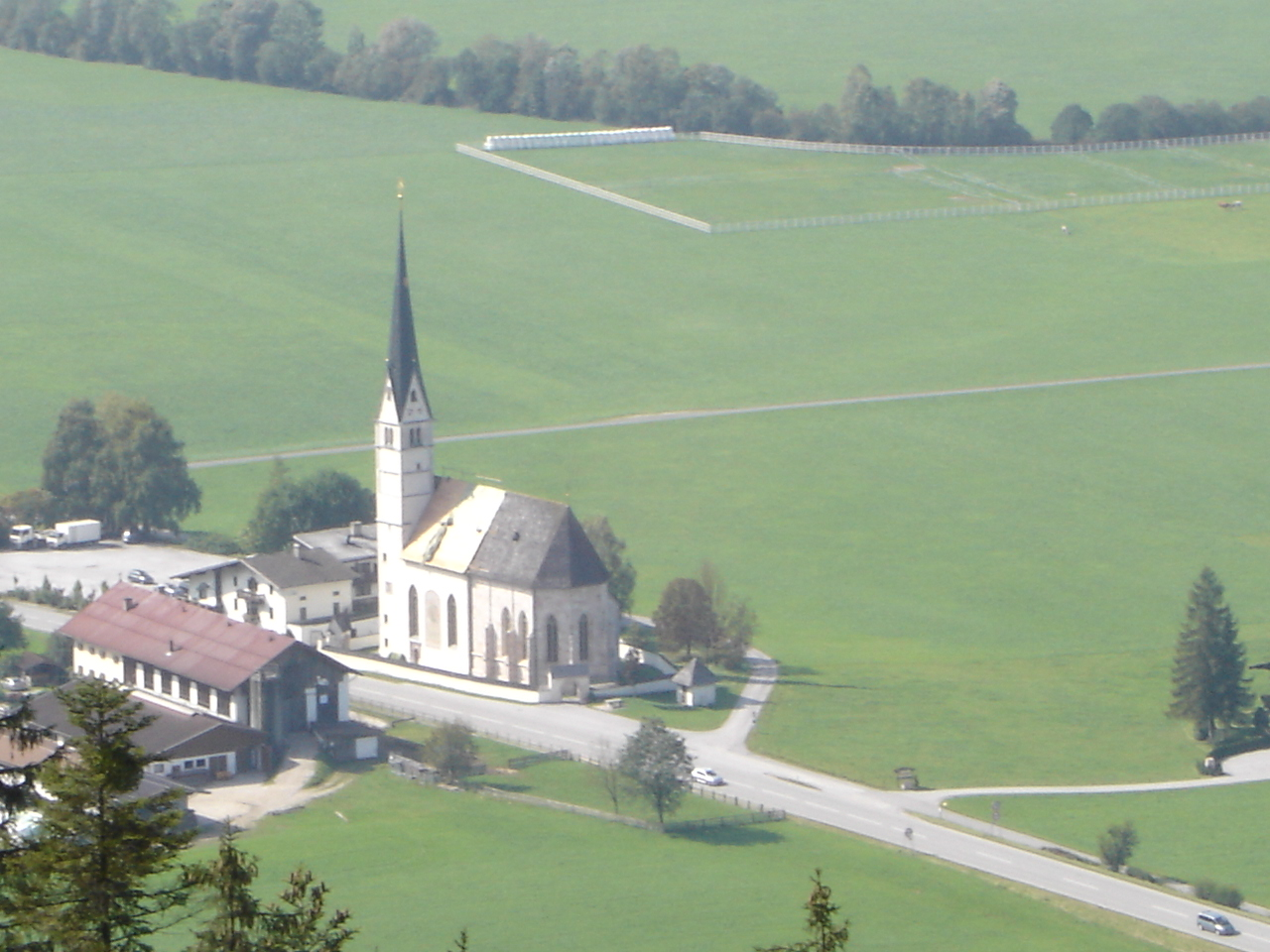
Church of St. Leonhard.

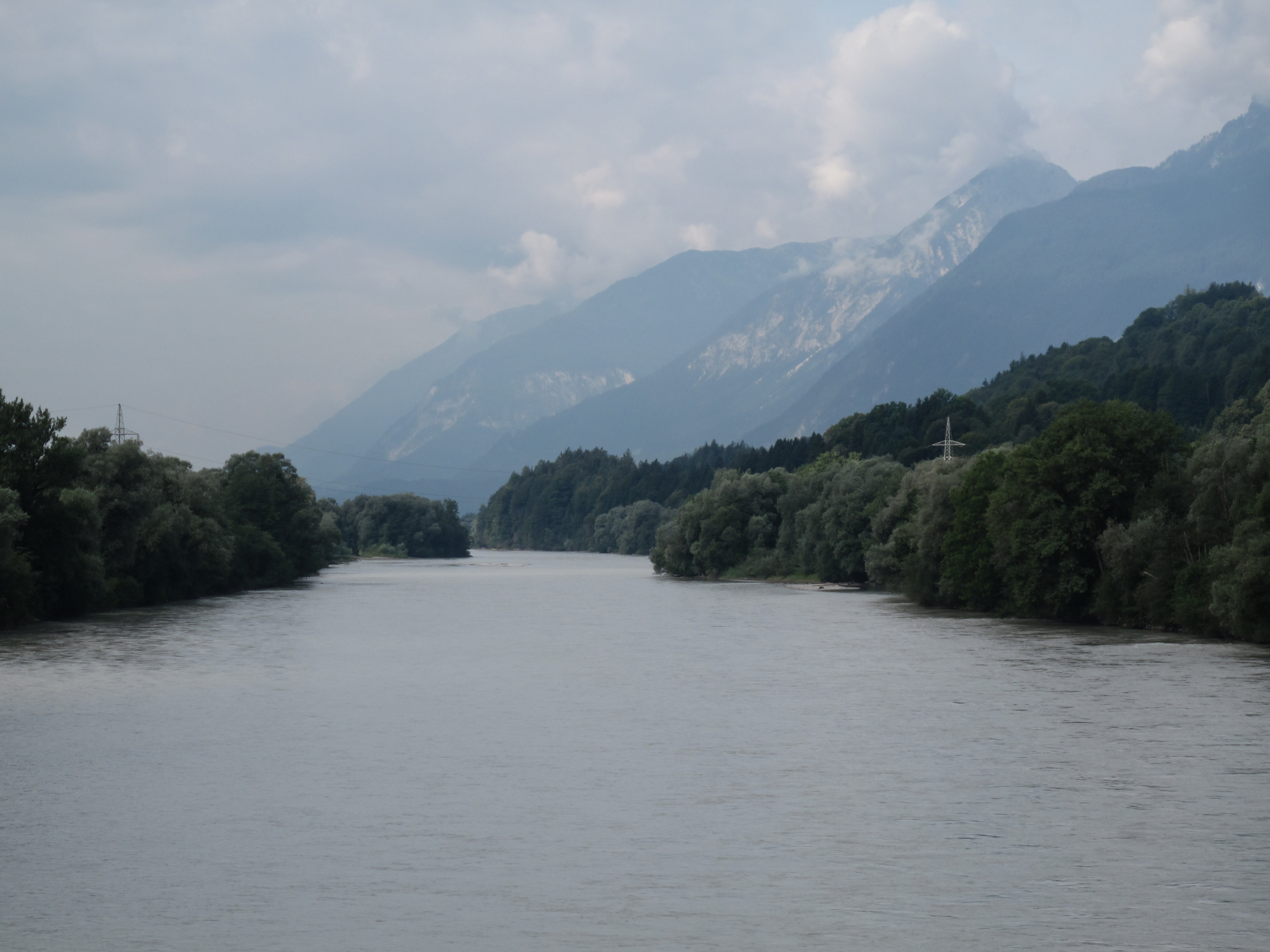
Kundl, river (der Inn) from the bridge
