= Brandenberg =

- Municipality
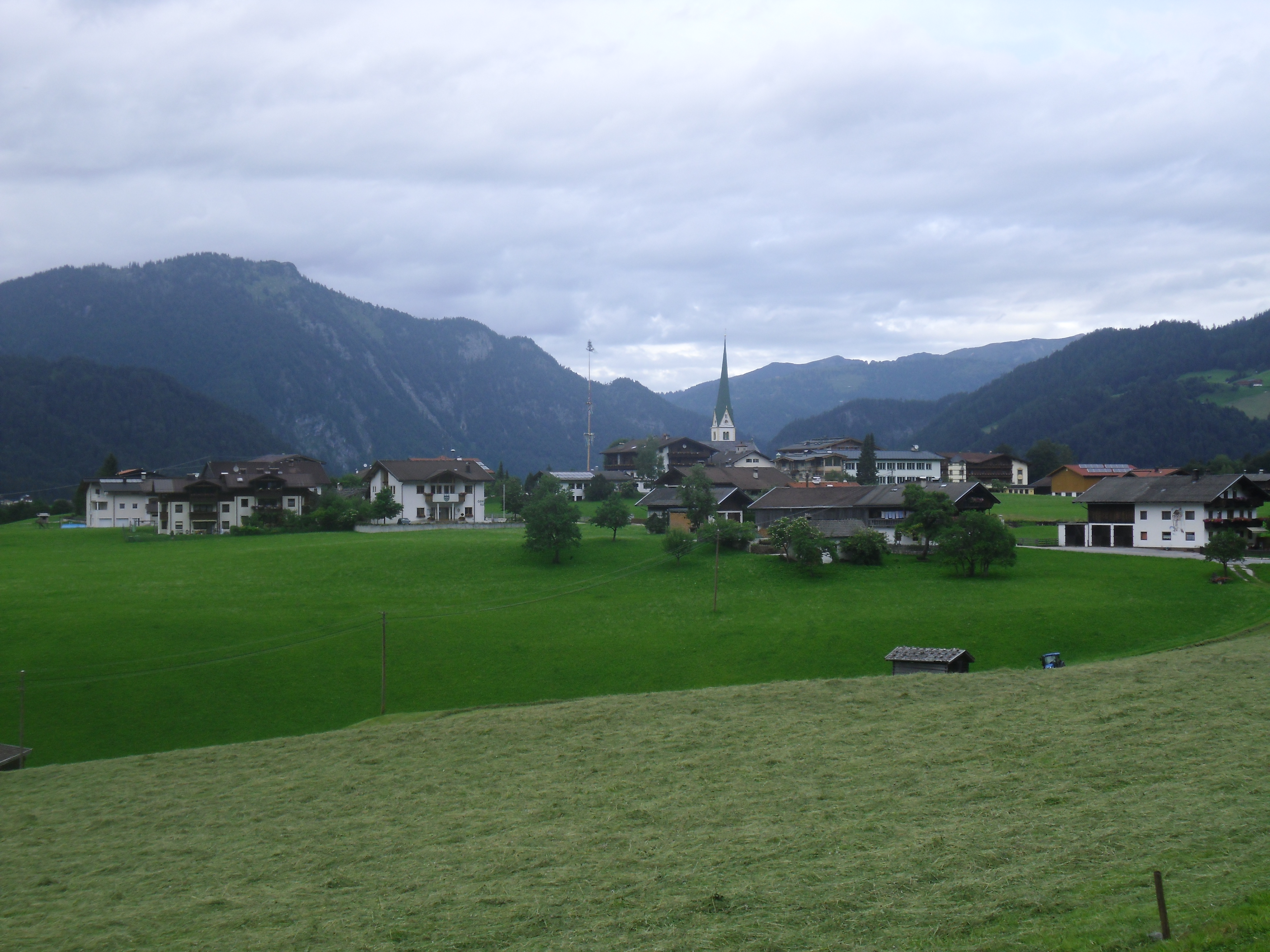
- View of Brandenberg

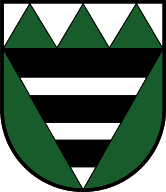
- Coat of arms

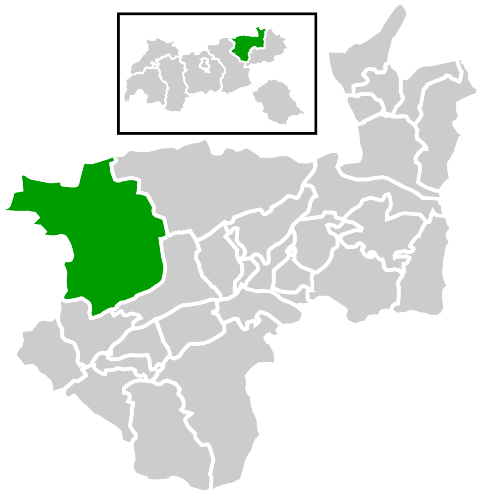
- Location within Kufstein district

- Location within Austria
- Coordinates: 47°30′29″N 11°53′27″E
- Country: Austria
- State: Tyrol
- District: Kufstein

Government
  - Mayor: Hans Jürgen Neuhauser

Area
  - Total: 130.17 km^{2} (50.26 sq mi)
- Elevation: 919 m (3,015 ft)

Population (2021)
  - Total: 1,531
  - Density: 11.76/km^{2} (30.46/sq mi)
- Time zone: UTC+1 (CET)
  - Summer (DST): UTC+2 (CEST)
- Postal code: 6234
- Area code: 05331
- Vehicle registration: KU
- Website: www.brandenberg. tirol.gv.at

Brandenberg is a municipality in the Austrian state of Tyrol in the district Kufstein. It consists of the Brandenberg village and the Aschau locality (German: Ortsteil).

Brandenberg was first mentioned in 1140, and became an independent municipality in the beginning of the 19th century. The municipality is located in the valley of the Brandenberger Ache river, a tributary of the Inn River. To the north, it shares a border with Germany. Neighbouring Austrian and German municipalities are Achenkirch, Breitenbach am Inn, Kramsach, Kreuth, Rottach-Egern, Steinberg am Rofan, and Thiersee.

A local specialty is the Prügeltorte cake.
