= Niederndorf =

Niederndorf is the name of following places:

- Niederndorf (Austria), Kufstein District, Austria
- Niederndorf (Freudenberg), Freudenberg, Westphalia, Germany

== See also ==
- Niederdorf (disambiguation)
- Niederndorferberg, Tyrol, Austria
