= Erl =

- Municipality
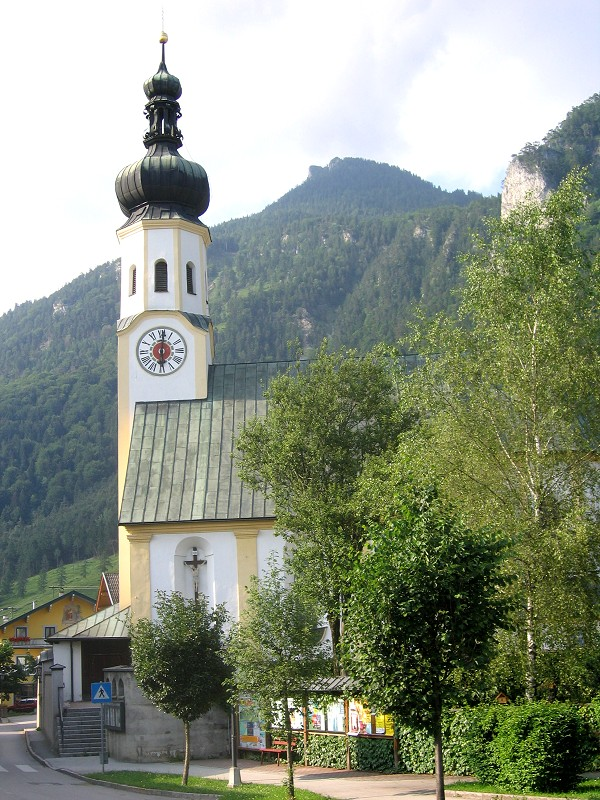

- Coat of arms

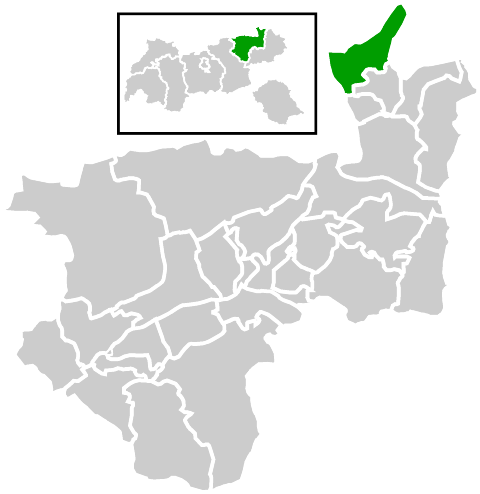
- Location within Kufstein district

- Location within Austria
- Coordinates: 47°40′54″N 12°10′51″E
- Country: Austria
- State: Tyrol
- District: Kufstein

Government
  - Mayor: Georg Aicher-Hechenberger (GFE)

Area
  - Total: 26.97 km^{2} (10.41 sq mi)
- Elevation: 476 m (1,562 ft)

Population (2021)
  - Total: 1,553
  - Density: 57.58/km^{2} (149.1/sq mi)
- Time zone: UTC+1 (CET)
  - Summer (DST): UTC+2 (CEST)
- Postal code: 6343
- Area code: 05373
- Vehicle registration: KU
- Website: www.erl.at

Erl is a municipality of 1,400 inhabitants in the Kufstein district in western Austria. It lies 15 km north of the administrative town of Kufstein in the northern part of the Tyrol, at the border with Bavaria, Germany.

Settlement began in the third century; Erl is mentioned in documents dating back to A.D. 788. The village has hosted a Passion play every six years since 1613 as well as the more recently founded summer and wintertime Tyrolean Festival, founded by Gustl Kuhn, which is devoted to classical music and opera.

== Neighbouring municipalities ==
- Nußdorf am Inn, B, North
- Samerberg, B, NE
- Aschau im Chiemgau, B, East
- Niederndorferberg, T, SE
- Niederndorf T, South
- Oberaudorf, B, SW
- Flintsbach am Inn, B, West

T = Tirol, Austria, B = Bayern, Germany
