= Stöffl Hut =

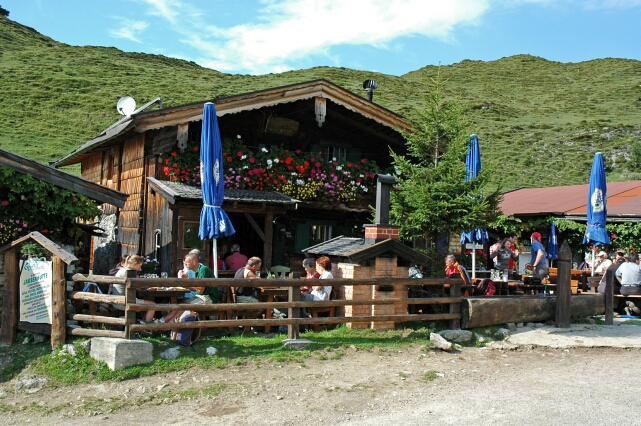
- The Stöffl Hut on the Walleralm
- Interactive map of the Stöffl Hut area

General information
- Location: Walleralm
- Coordinates: 47.55667°N 12.20556°E
- Elevation: 1,170 m (3,840 ft)
- Owner: Bichler family

Website
- www.walleralm.at

The Stöffl Hut (German: Stöfflhütte) is a very old mountain hut at the foot of the Wilder Kaiser in the Austrian state of Tyrol.

== Location ==
The hut lies at a height of 1,170 m (AA) in an alpine pasture known as the Walleralm. It is an easy stroll from Lake Hinterstein but may also be used as meal stop (Jausenstation) for a range of hiking and climbing tours around the Wilder Kaiser.

== History ==
The Stöffl Hut was built over 350 years ago on the Walleralm. In summer the local alp is traditionally farmed (for cattle and the production of cheese, etc.); in recent years it has become a focal point for hikers and walkers.

== Facilities ==
During the summer months the Stöffl Hut is run by the Bichler family from Schwoich and is a popular stop for hikers, walkers and mountain bikers.
