= Mariastein =

Mariastein may refer to:

- Mariastein Abbey at Metzerlen-Mariastein, in the canton of Solothurn, Switzerland
- Mariastern Abbey, Banja Luka in Banja Luka, Bosnia and Herzegovina
- Mariastein, Tyrol, a town in the district of Kufstein in Tyrol, Austria
