= Coat of arms of Tyrol =

Historic coat of arms of the region of Tyrol

The coat of arms of the region

The Coat of Arms of Tyrol is the historic coat of arms of the region of Tyrol. It shows a red eagle. It was used by the Princely County of Tyrol and is today used by the states of Tyrol in Austria, South Tyrol in Italy, and numerous municipalities.

== The Tyrolean Eagle ==
Coat of arms of Tyrol, Austria.

Coat of arms of South Tyrol, Italy.

The Tyrolean eagle is red on a silver shield, with a golden beak, claws, and "clover-stems" which line the wings. It has been used as a symbol of the region since the early 13th century.

The eagle originates as the hereditary coat of arms of the Counts of Tyrol, who resided at Tyrol Castle, which gave its name to the greater region. The seal of Albert IV, Count of Tyrol, dating from 1205, displays the Tyrolean eagle. It developed independently from the similar Coat of Arms of Brandenburg. The oldest colored representations date to the years 1271 and 1286. In 1416, under the Habsburg monarchy, the eagle was crowned and the shield surmounted with a princely cap.

== Austrian State of Tyrol ==
The coat of arms of the Austrian State of Tyrol show the Tyrolean Eagle crowned and its head surrounded by a laurel wreath. This design is based on that of the coins (Andreas Hofer-Kreutzer) produced during the Tyrolean Rebellion against Napoleon in 1809. However, a laurel wreath has been incorporated into some depictions of the arms since the 17th century.

The coat of arms in its current form was granted in 1946, and the Law of 17 May 2006 on the use of the State Coat of Arms (Tyrolean State Coat of Arms Act) specifies the blazon and use of the coat of arms.

== Italian Autonomous Province of South Tyrol ==
The arms of the Italian Autonomous Province of South Tyrol and of the greater autonomous region of Trentino-Alto Adige/Südtirol both feature the Tyrolean eagle, although the design of the eagle is different from the one used by the Austrian State. It was designed by the Bolzano-based architect and artist Helga von Aufschnaiter on behalf of the South Tyrolean Regional Government under Silvius Magnago. The design is based on the original coat of arms of the Counts of Tyrol, which can be seen on the altar in Tyrol Castle dating back to 1370, and omits the laurel wreath, wing trefoils, and crown used in the coat of arms of the Austrian State.

== Use in municipal coats of arms ==
The coats of arms of numerous Tyrolean municipalities contain the Tyrolean eagle or parts of it to demonstrate that they belong to Tyrol. The red eagle as a whole is used in the coats of arms of Brixlegg, Landeck, Mareo, Merano, Radfeld, St. Anton am Arlberg, Sterzing, Tirol Commune, Ton, Vomp, and Wiesing. The coats of arms of Glurns and Ulten show the eagle divided with other charges, those of Gerlos and Spiss show the eagle's head, Jungholtz's the eagle's wing, and Rettenschöss the eagle's talons.

== Gallery ==
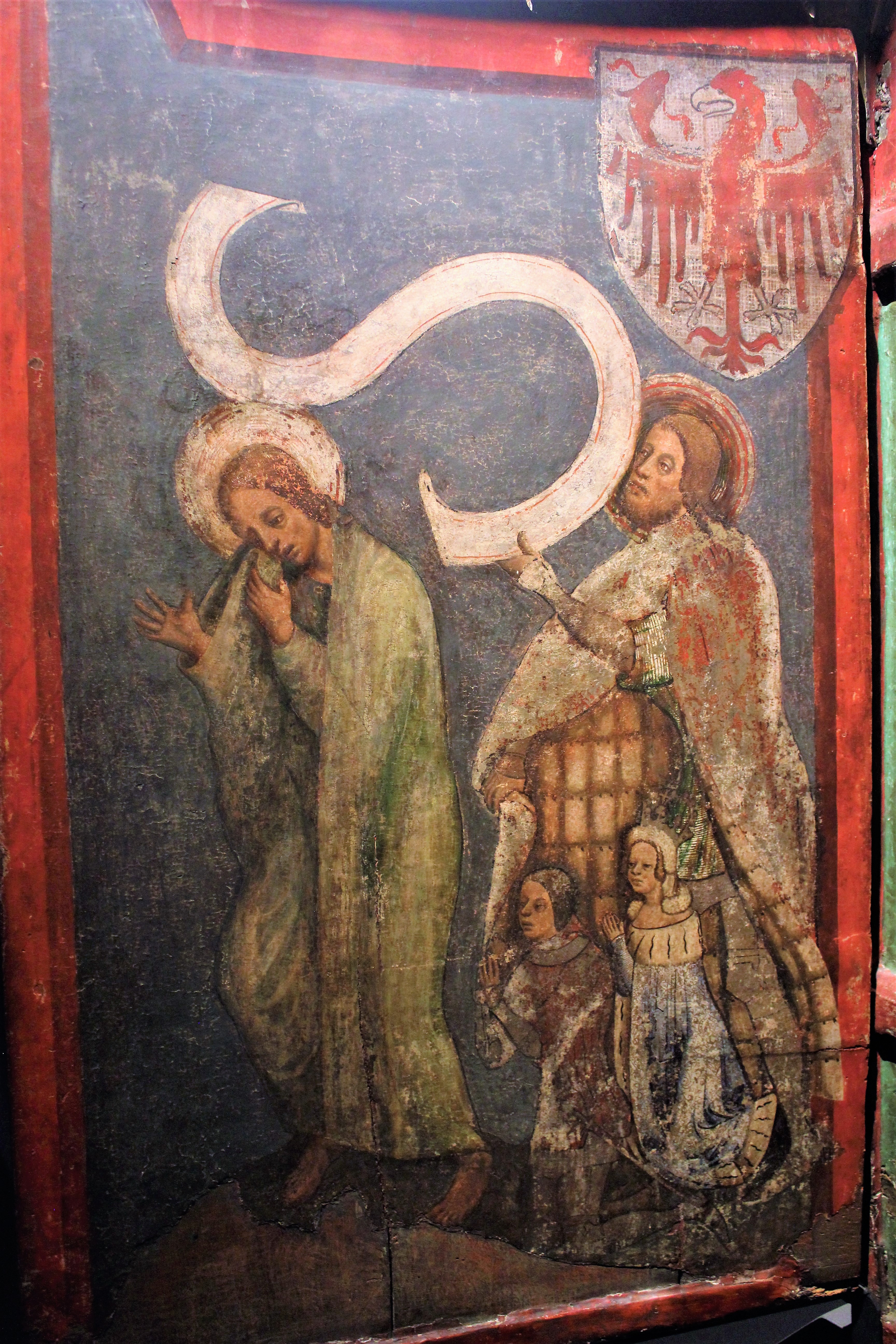
The coat of arms on the Altar at Tyrol Castle, also the basis for the modern arms of South Tyrol, 1370

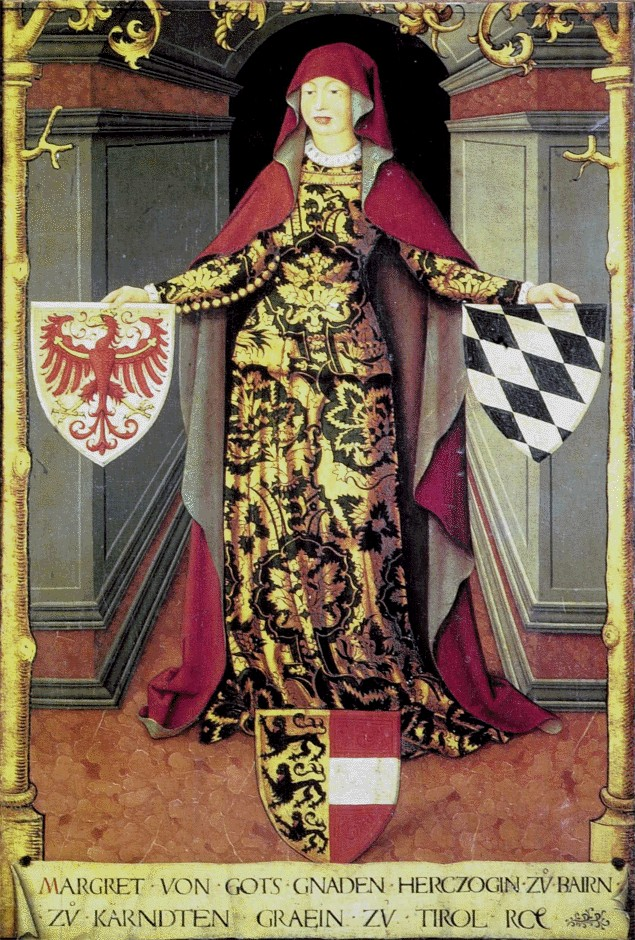
Margaret, Countess of Tyrol holds the coat of arms of Tyrol in her right hand, 16th century

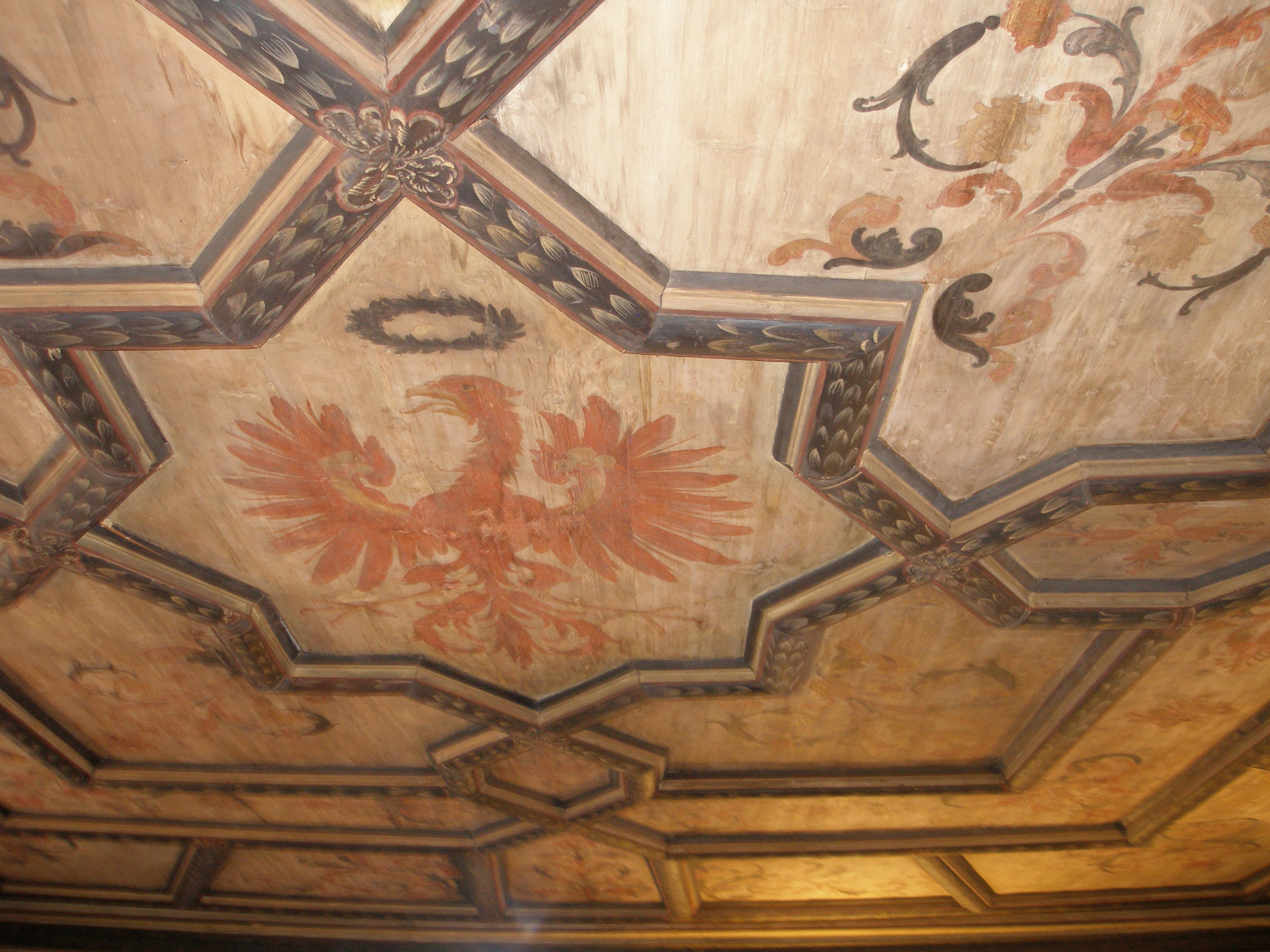
The eagle shown with a laurel wreath, old Town Hall of Bolzano, 1600

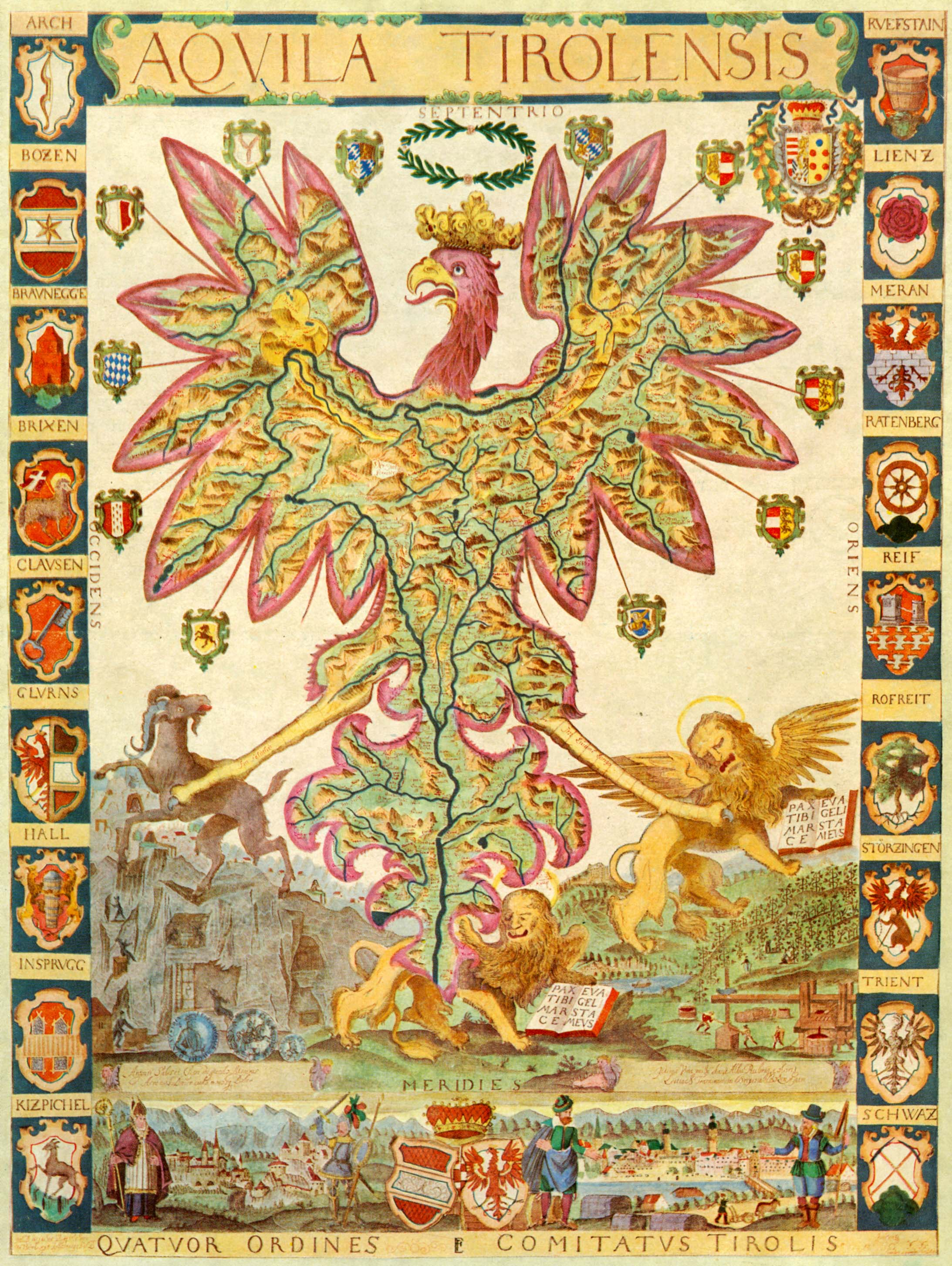
The Tyrolean Eagle on an allegorical depiction of the County of Tyrol, Matthias Burglechner, 1626

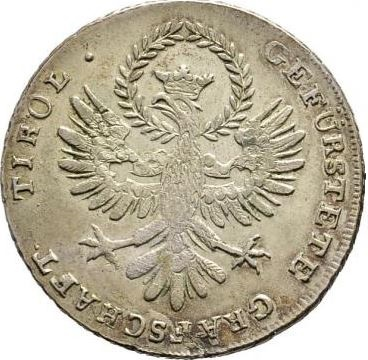
The eagle on the obverse of an Andreas Hofer Kreutzer, also the basis for the modern arms of Austrian Tyrol, 1808

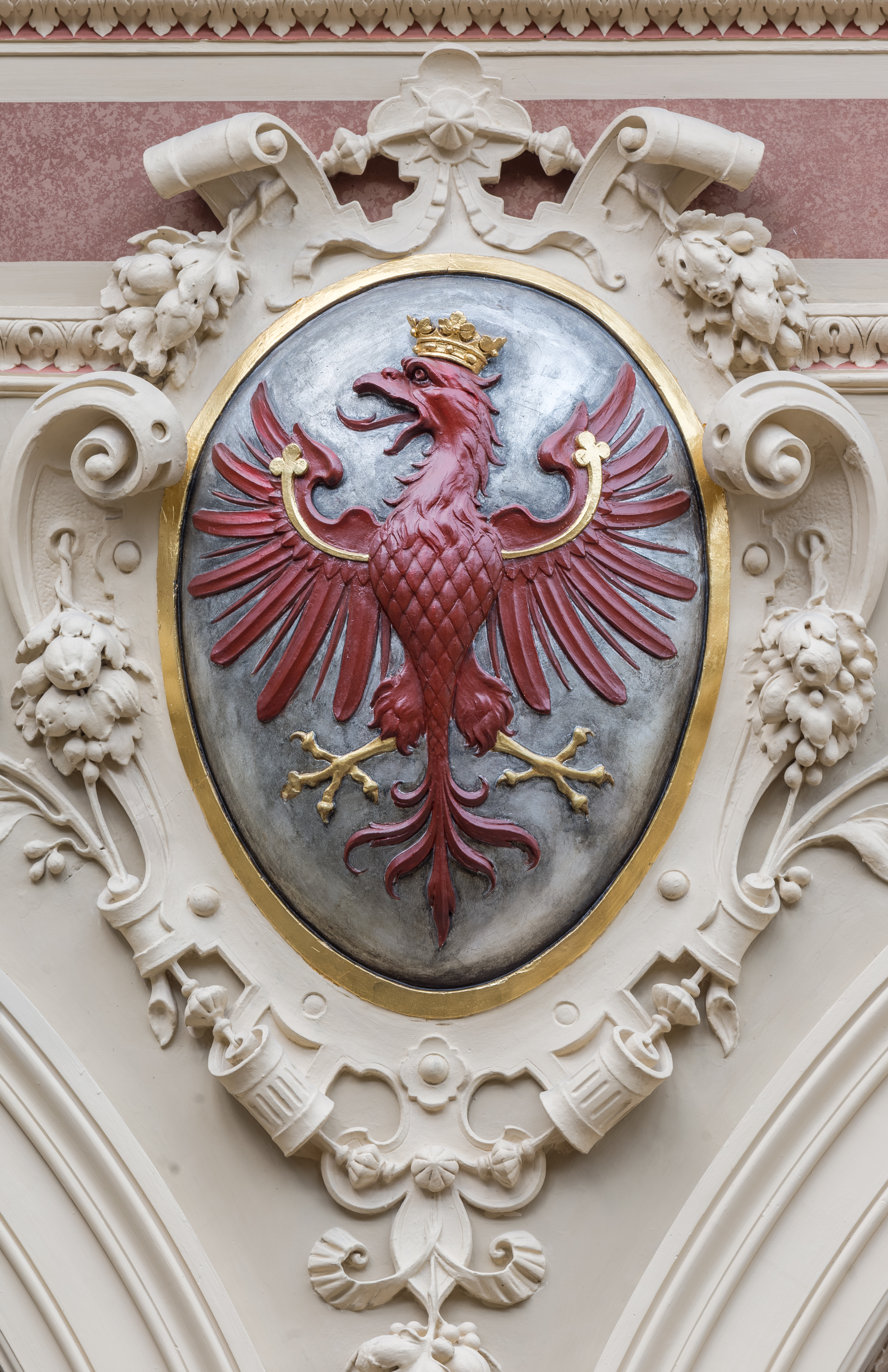
The coat of arms of the County of Tyrol in the Aula at the Palace of Justice in Vienna, 1880

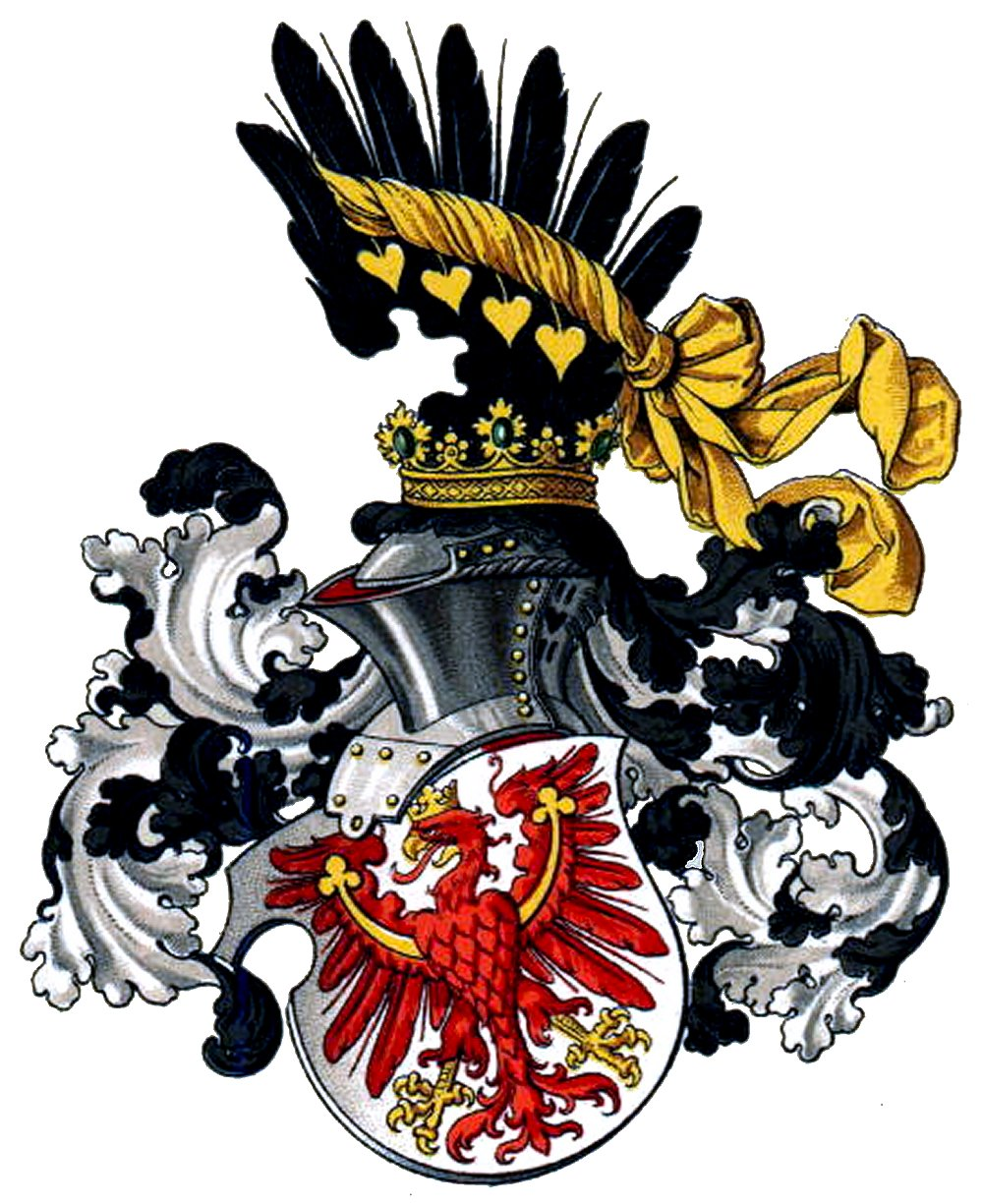
The coat of arms of the County of Tyrol, Hugo Gerard Ströhl, 1890

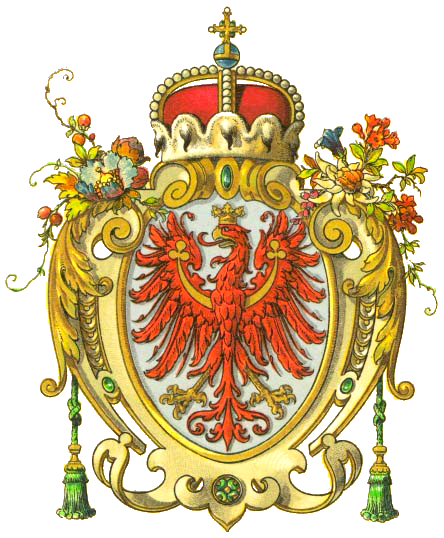
The coat of arms of the County of Tyrol in a botanically adorned console, Hugo Gerard Ströhl, 1890

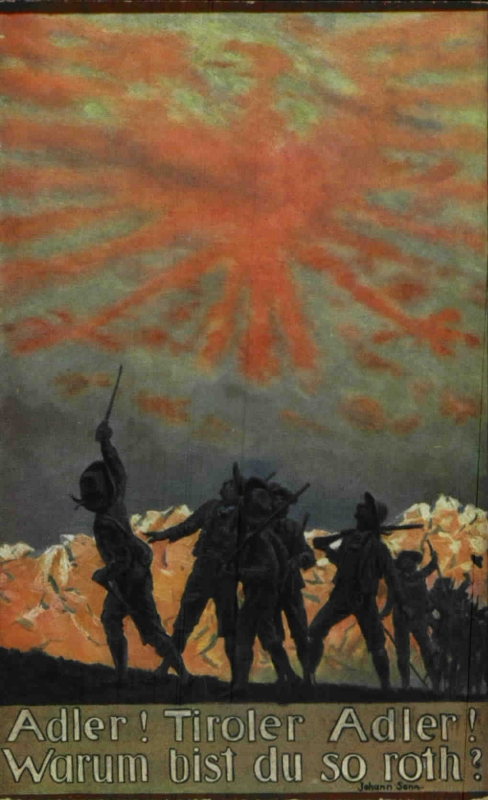
The Tyrolean Eagle on an Austrian WWI-era postcard

The Tyrolean Eagle on the coat of arms of Merano

The wing of the Tyrolean Eagle on the coat of arms of Jungholz

== See also ==
- Coat of Arms of Brandenburg, a very similar coat of arms
