= Andreas Hofer Kreuzer =

The Andreas Hofer Kreuzer, also called the Hofer Kreuzer or Sandwirtszwanziger, was the name of the 20- and 1-kreuzer coins that were minted during the Tyrolean Rebellion in Hall in Tirol in 1809. The obverse depicts the Tyrolean Eagle and the inscription Gefürstete Grafschaft Tirol; the reverse shows the nominal value.

== Historical linkages ==
As a result of the Treaty of Pressburg and the establishment of French and Bavarian foreign rule in 1805, Andreas Hofer Tyrols became a popular leader of the rebellious Tyrolese peasants against Napoleon I and Bavarian occupation. The Tyrolean freedom fighter came from the countryside. His birthplace at the so-called Sandhof in the Passeiertal valley was also an inn.

After the victorious Battle of Bergisel over the French general, the Duke of Danzig, François-Joseph Lefebvre, on 13 August 1809, Hofer moved into Innsbruck on 15 August and formed the Provisional General State Administration (provisorische Generallandesverwaltung). However, the liberation of Tyrol from foreign rule was short-lived. In the treaty concluded between Austria and Revolutionary France on 14 October 1809, the Vienna-Schönbrunn Treaty, Tyrol as a Bavarian province was excluded. The enemy advanced in superior numbers into the state and Hofer was defeated at Bergisel on 1 November after heavy resistance.

According to Rudolf Granichstaedten-Czerva, the Hofer Kreuzer was emergency money intended to cover the urgent need for money during the Tyrolean struggle for freedom. The silver came from the Brixlegg Smelt Works and from purchases. Non-essential church silver was also supposedly used for the coinage. Emperor Francis II/I (1792–1806–1835) actually had minting rights for minting the kreuzer pieces. Nevertheless, the coinage was not an encroachment on the rights of coinage, because it was ordered by Intendant Joseph von Hormayr, who was endowed with imperial authority by the decree of Innsbruck, 26 July 1809. The view that its minting was a violation of mint law is thus refuted.

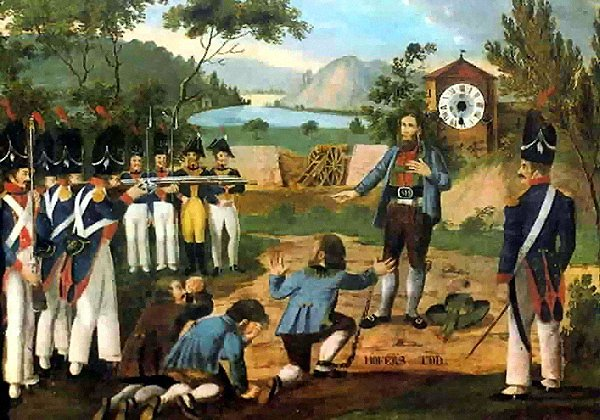
Hofer's execution on 20 February 1810 in Mantua. A legend about the execution relating to a Sandwirtszwanziger was mentioned by Granichstaedten-Czerva in Andreas Hofer's alte Garde (contemporary work with a picture clock)

Andreas Hofer was arrested on 28 January 1810 for treason and shot on 20 February in Mantua by French Grenadiers.

The Hofer family was ennobled by Austrian Emperor Francis I in 1818. Hofer himself had already been raised to the nobility. Due to the events of the war, however, the decree was sent to the Tyrol.

=== Legend ===
A legend about Hofer's execution, in which a Sandwirtszwenzig is significant, is recounted by Granichstaedten-Czerva as follows:

When Andreas Hofer was facing the grenadiers of the second battalion of the 13th French Infantry Regiment, who had been ordered to execute him up against the fortress wall in the square at Mantua, he gave the commander of the troops, Corporal Michel Eiffes (b. 1780, d. 1849), the last piece of money he still had: one Haller Zwanziger and said that the coin reminded him of his beloved fatherland. Then Hofer shouted: Open fire!

— Rudolf Granichstaedten-Czerva, Andreas Hofer's alte Garde (1932), pp. 59-60 (version by Wolfgang Morschner 2009)

== Description ==
The Andreas Hofer Kreuzer was struck in the mint at Hall in Tirol under the mintmaster, Hubert Josef Jolliot, without a mintmaster's mark. Clockmaker Joseph Bayerer of Innsbruck worked as coin cutter. The coin denominations from the time of the Tyrolean struggle for freedom are 20 kreuzer pieces in silver and 1 kreuzer pieces in copper dated 1809. They were minted in large numbers and in numerous variants with small differences due to the large number of coin dies used.

=== 20 Kreuzer coin ===
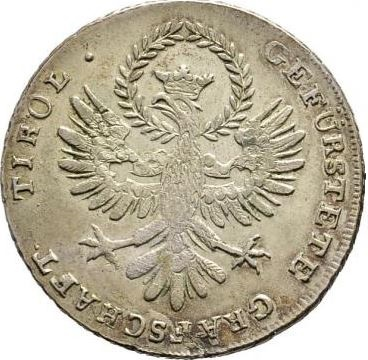
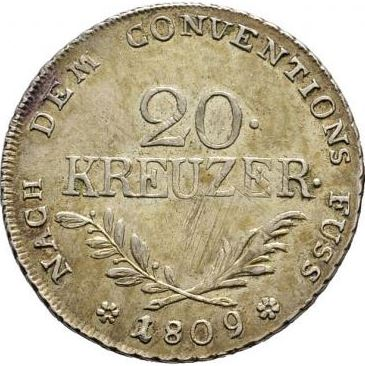
Sandwirtszwanziger, 1809, diameter 27 mm, testing marks)
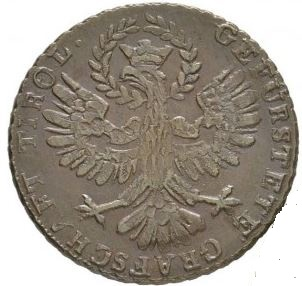
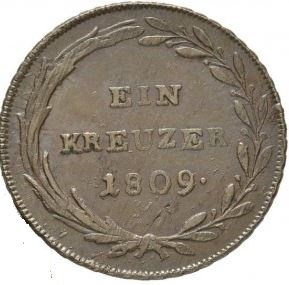
1 Kreuzer coin, 1809, diameter 24 mm

The 20 Kreuzer coin is also known as the Sandwirtszwanziger ("Sandwirt 20-er"), since the coins were minted during the Tyrolean uprising, which took place under the leadership of Andreas Hofer of the Sandwirt Inn.

The diameter of the piece is 27 millimetres, its gross weight is 6.65 g. The coin edge was executed in a leaf pattern.

- The obverse shows the crowned Tyrolean eagle adorned with a wreath of honour. wing stems with clover leaves have been embossed into the eagle wings. Some 20 Kreuzer pieces come with raised wing stems; they are rarer. The inscription reads GEFRSTETE GRAFSCHAFT TIROL.
- The reverse bears the denomination 20 / KREUZER, below which a laurel and a palm branch are crossed. Below between rosettes is the year 1809. The inscription on the reverse reads NACH DEM CONVENTIONS FUSS.

=== 1 Kreuzer coin ===
The copper kreuzer is a state coin (Scheidemünze) dated 1809. Its diameter is 24 millimetres and its weight is about 4.5 g. The obverse corresponds to the Hofer 20-Kreuzer coins. On the reverse is the value EIN / KREUZER within the laurel and palm branch tied to the wreath. The rim of the coin was designed in a leaf pattern.

== Literature ==
- Heinz Fengler, Gerd Gierow, Willy Unger: transpress-Lexikon Numismatik. transpress Verlag, Berlin, 1976
- Helmut Kahnt: Das große Münzlexikon von A bis Z. H. Gietl Verlag, Regenstauf, 2005
- Friedrich von Schrötter, N. Bauer, K. Regling, A. Suhle, R. Vasmer, J. Wilcke: Wörterbuch der Münzkunde, Berlin, 1970 (reprint of the original edition of 1930)
- Heinz Tillmann (ed.): Biographien zur Weltgeschichte, Lexikon, Deutscher Verlag der Wissenschaften, Berlin 1989
- BI-Universallexikon Leipzig, Bibliographisches Institut 1989, Vol. 2
- Josef v. Kolb: Die Tiroler Zwanziger und Kreuzer vom Jahre 1809 (Tyrolean State Museum, Ferdinandeum, Innsbruck)
- Granichstaedten-Czerva: Andreas Hofers alte Garde, Innsbruck 1932, pp. 59–60 (version by Wolfgang Morschner 2009)
- 1991 edition standard catalog of WORLD COINS by Chester L. Krause and Clifford Mishler, p. 156, No. 148/149: Tyrol, 1 Kreuzer und 20 Kreuzer, Rebellion, Andreas Hofer
