= Angerberg =

- Municipality
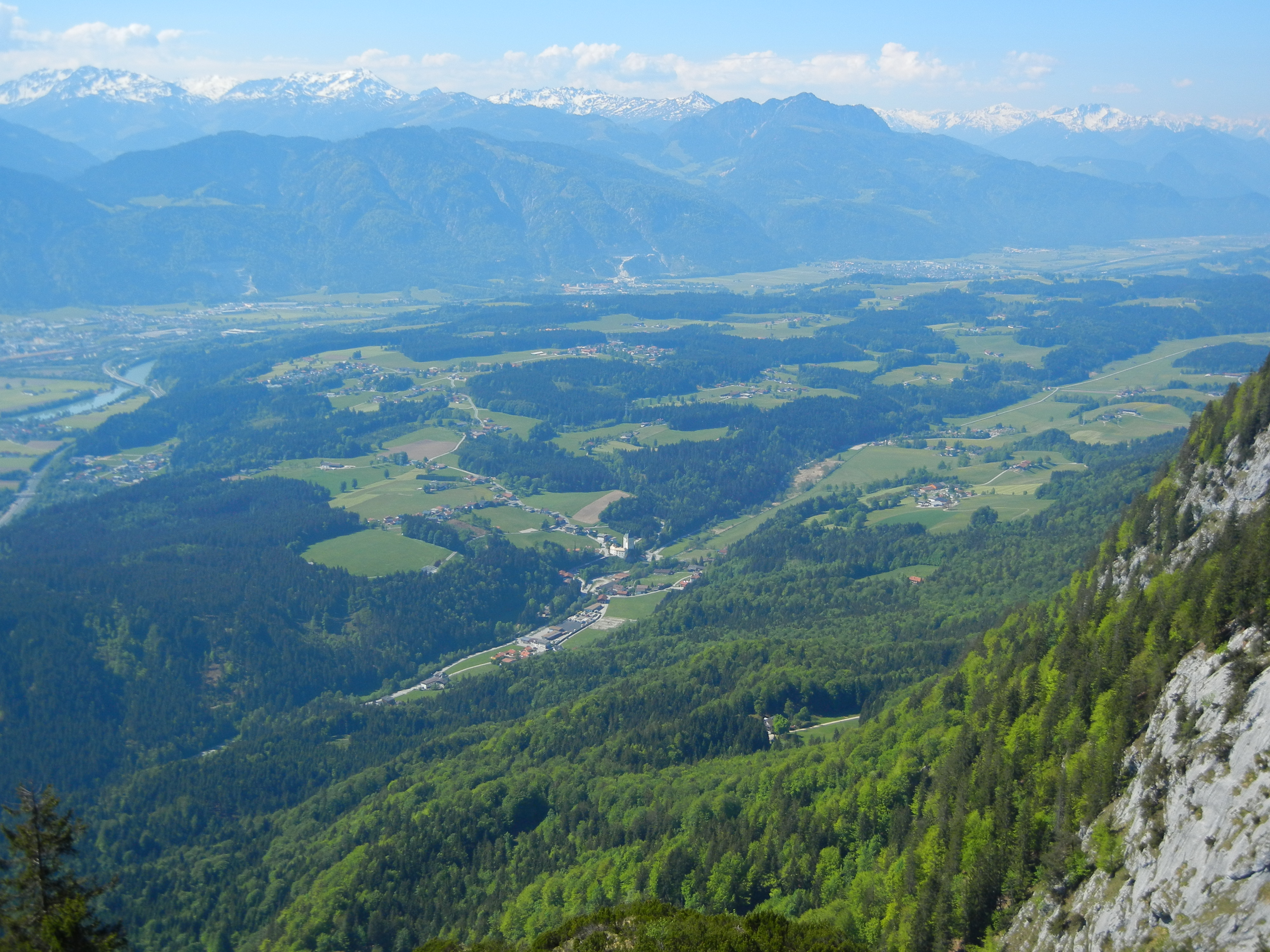
- Remote view of Angerberg

- Coat of arms

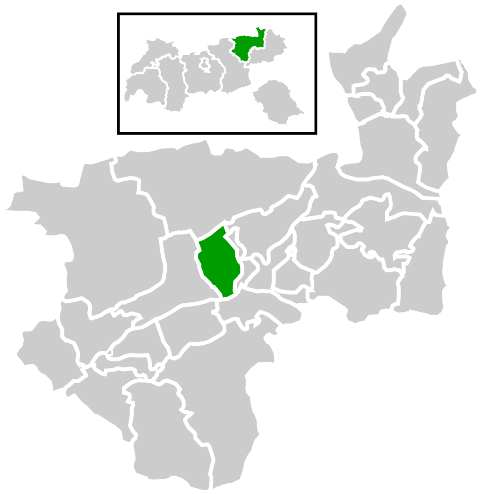
- Location within Kufstein district

- Location within Austria
- Coordinates: 47°30′00″N 12°01′00″E
- Country: Austria
- State: Tyrol
- District: Kufstein

Government
  - Mayor: Walter Osl

Area
  - Total: 19.54 km^{2} (7.54 sq mi)
- Elevation: 650 m (2,130 ft)

Population (2021)
  - Total: 1,925
  - Density: 98.52/km^{2} (255.2/sq mi)
- Time zone: UTC+1 (CET)
  - Summer (DST): UTC+2 (CEST)
- Postal code: 6320
- Area code: 05332
- Vehicle registration: KU
- Website: www.angerberg.at

Angerberg is a municipality in the Kufstein district of Austria. It is located 2.7 kilometres (1.7 mi) north of Wörgl and 14 kilometres (9 mi) southwest of Kufstein. The village was mentioned for the first time in documents in 1190.

== Population ==
Historical population
Year	Pop.	±%
1869	665	—
1888	645	−3.0%
1900	614	−4.8%
1910	682	+11.1%
1923	711	+4.3%
1934	763	+7.3%
1951	840	+10.1%
1961	802	−4.5%
1971	884	+10.2%
1981	1,124	+27.1%
1991	1,377	+22.5%
2001	1,664	+20.8%
2011	1,739	+4.5%
