= Angath =

- Municipality
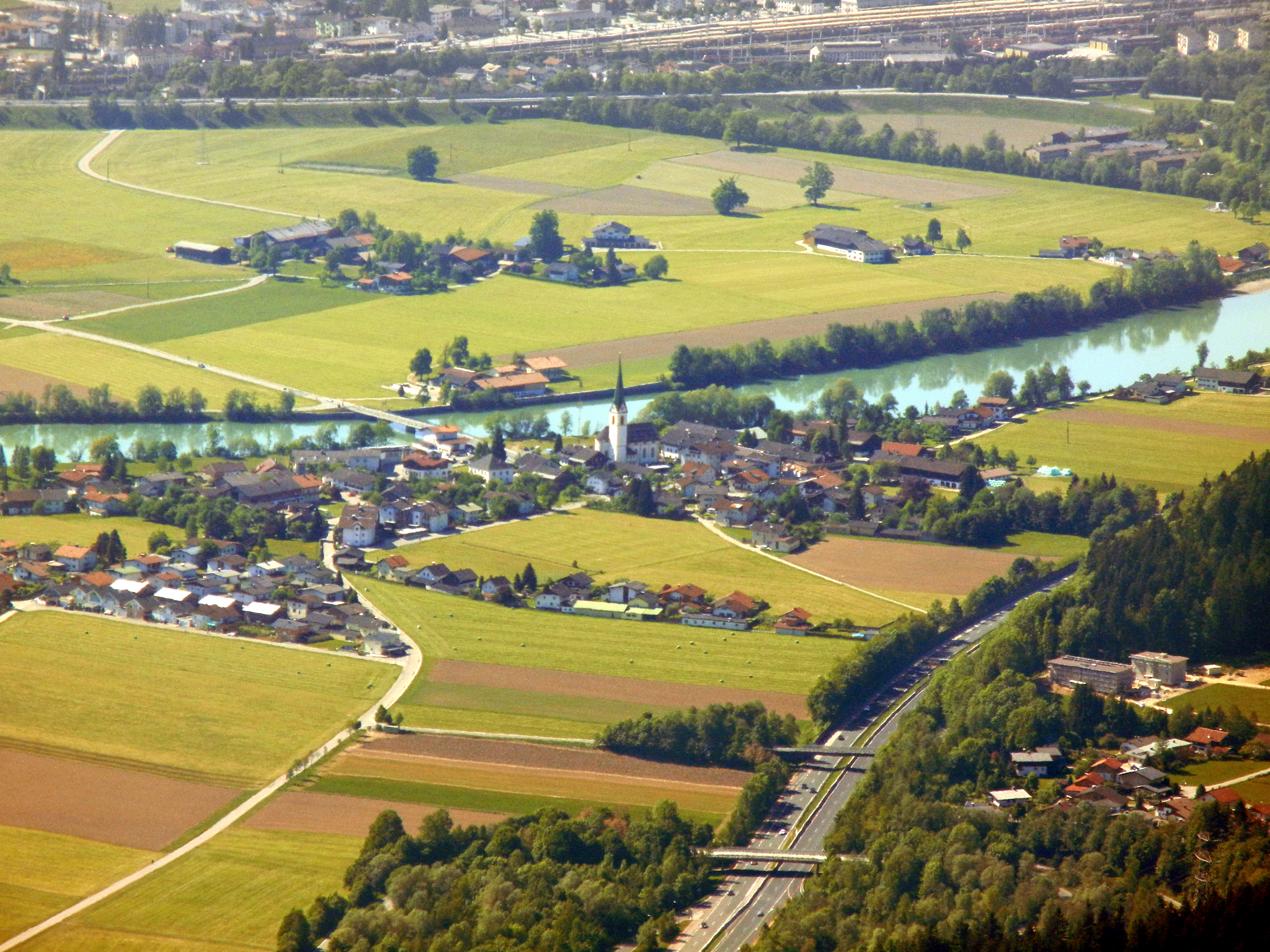

- Coat of arms

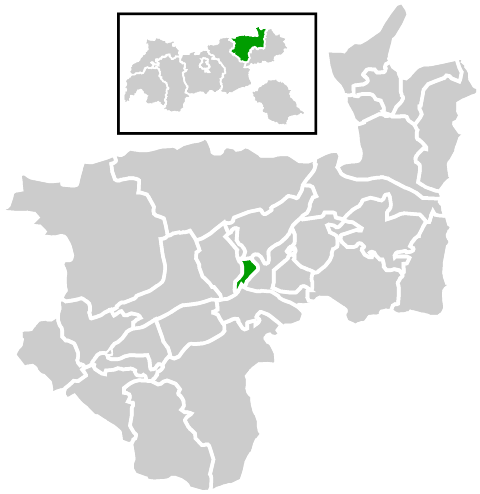
- Location within Kufstein district

- Location within Austria
- Coordinates: 47°30′00″N 12°04′00″E
- Country: Austria
- State: Tyrol
- District: Kufstein

Government
  - Mayor: Josef Haaser (ÖVP)

Area
  - Total: 3.5 km^{2} (1.4 sq mi)
- Elevation: 500 m (1,600 ft)

Population (2021)
  - Total: 1,031
  - Density: 290/km^{2} (760/sq mi)
- Time zone: UTC+1 (CET)
  - Summer (DST): UTC+2 (CEST)
- Postal code: 6321
- Area code: 0 53 32
- Vehicle registration: KU

Angath is a municipality in the Kufstein district in the Austrian state of Tyrol located 2 km north of Wörgl and 13 km southwest of Kufstein on the northern shore of the Inn River. The village has 6 parts and acts as a dormitory suburb for commuters from Wörgl and Kufstein.
