= Langkampfen =

- Municipality
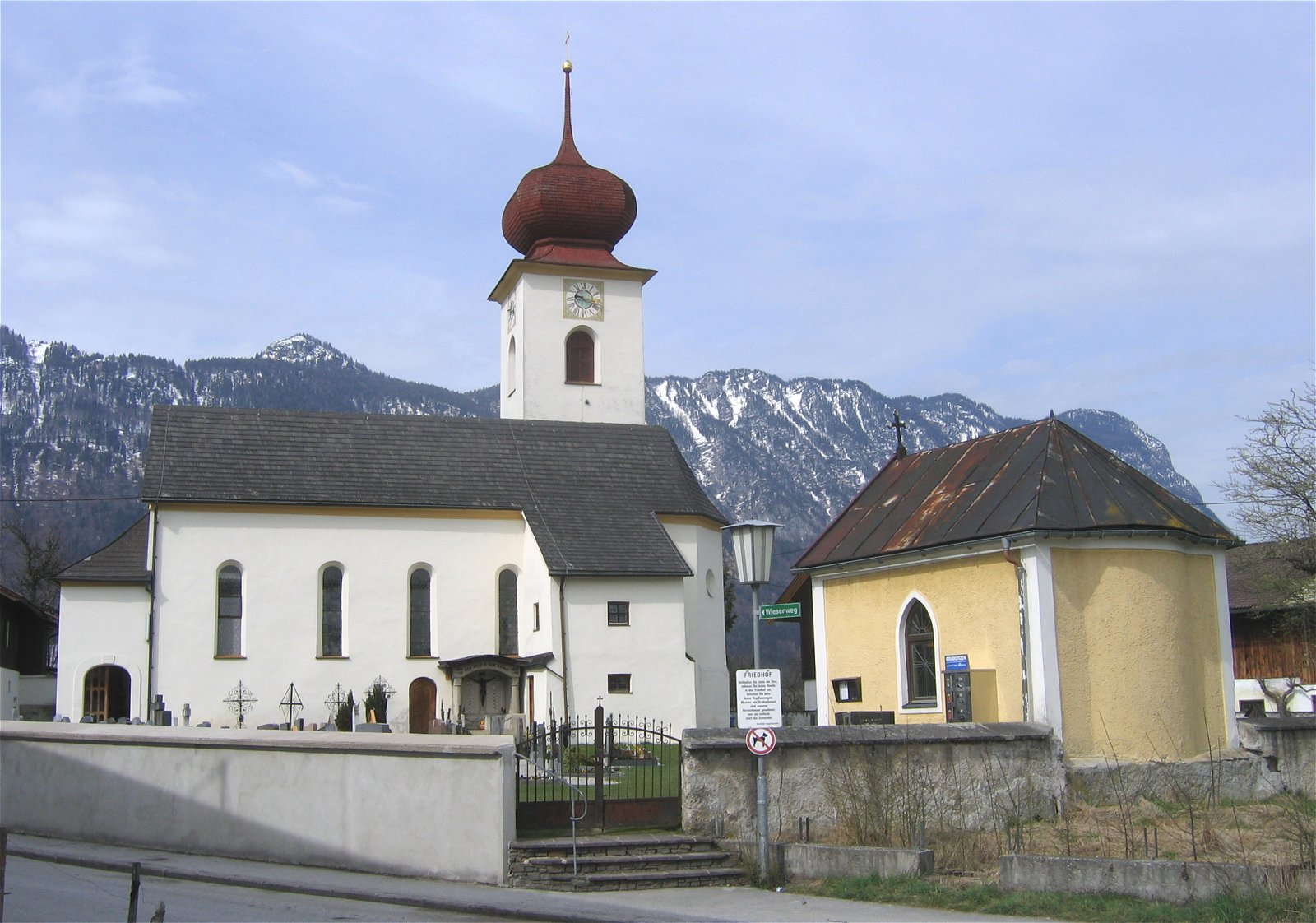

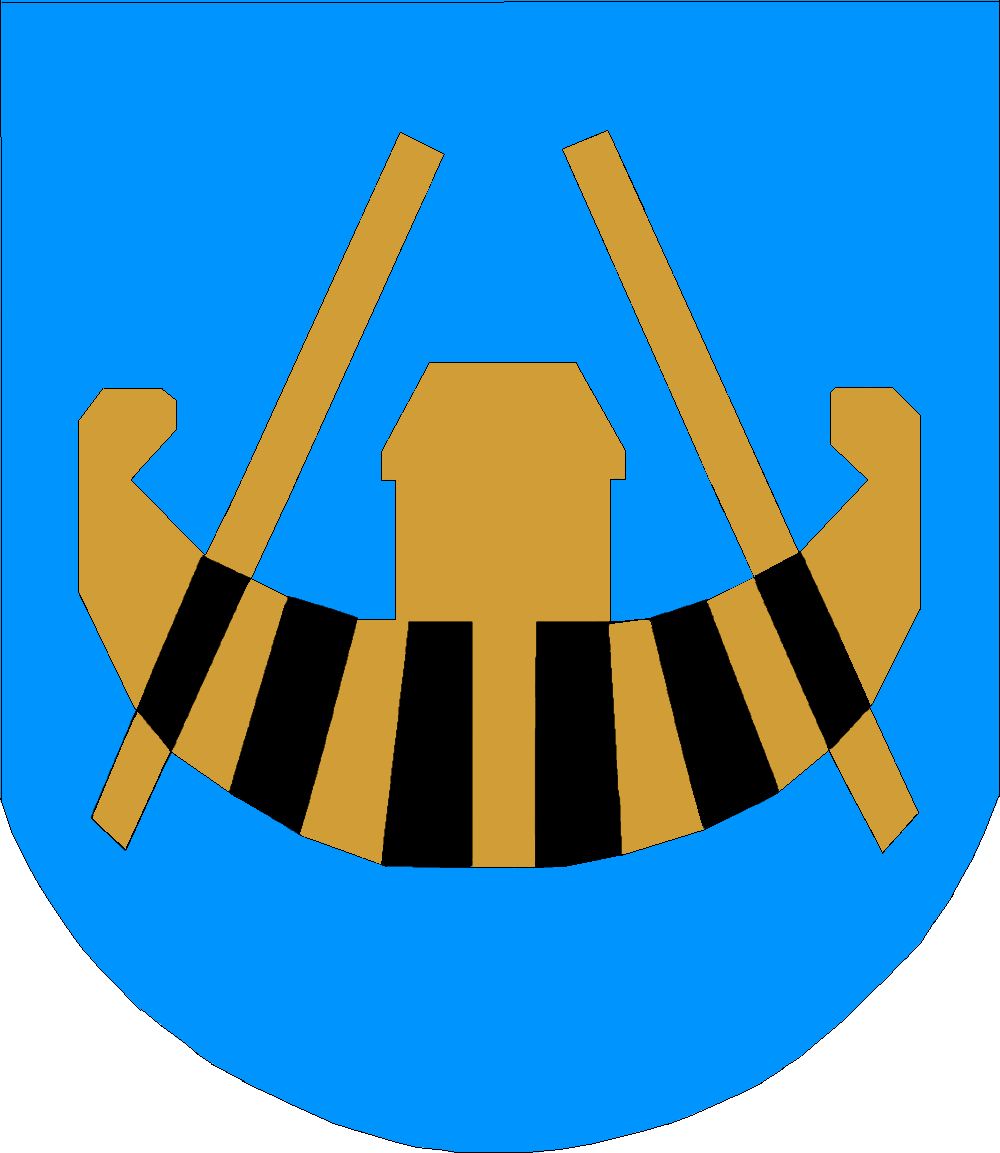
- Coat of arms

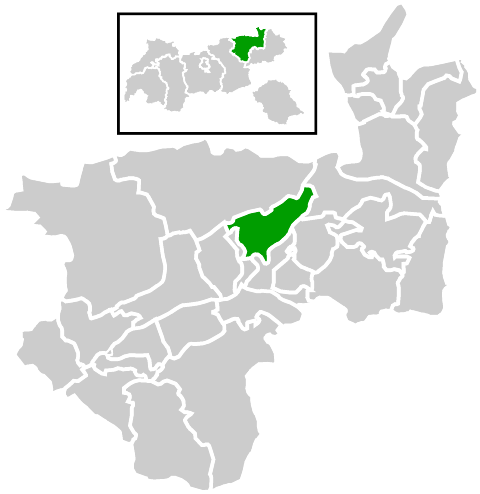
- Location within Kufstein district

- Location within Austria
- Coordinates: 47°33′07″N 12°06′14″E
- Country: Austria
- State: Tyrol
- District: Kufstein

Government
  - Mayor: Andreas Ehrenstrasser (ÖVP)

Area
  - Total: 26.51 km^{2} (10.24 sq mi)
- Elevation: 504 m (1,654 ft)

Population (2018-01-01)
  - Total: 4,108
  - Density: 155.0/km^{2} (401.3/sq mi)
- Time zone: UTC+1 (CET)
  - Summer (DST): UTC+2 (CEST)
- Postal code: 6336
- Area code: 05332
- Vehicle registration: KU
- Website: www.langkampfen.tirol.gv.at

Langkampfen is a municipality in the Austrian state of Tyrol between Kufstein (8 km southwest below) and Wörgl (8 km north above). The name comes from the Latin Longus campus, which means the long field.
