= Niederdorf =

Niederdorf may refer to:

== Places ==
=== Germany ===
- Niederdorf, Saxony

=== Italy ===
- Niederdorf, South Tyrol, a municipality in South Tyrol

=== Switzerland ===
- Niederdorf, Basel-Landschaft
- Niederdorf, Zürich, a section of the old town in the City of Zürich
- Niederdorf district

== See also ==
- Niederndorf (disambiguation)
