= Münster, Tyrol =

Münster
- Municipality
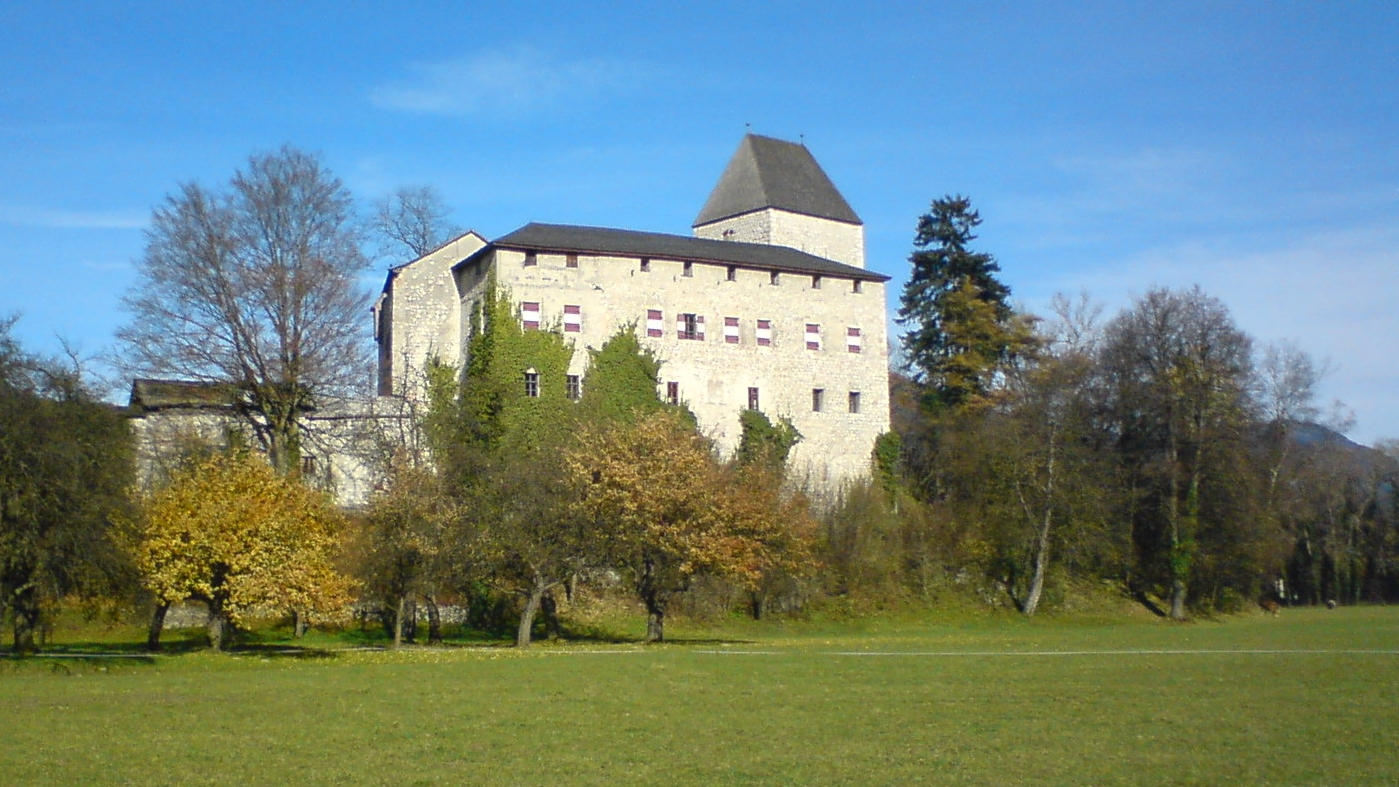
- Lichtenwerth Castle in Münster, Tyrol

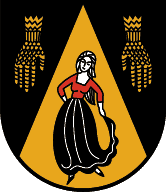
- Coat of arms

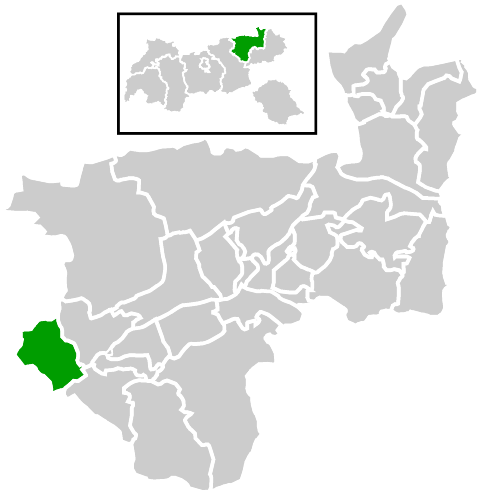
- Location within Kufstein district

- Location within Austria
- Coordinates: 47°25′16″N 11°50′02″E
- Country: Austria
- State: Tyrol
- District: Kufstein

Government
  - Mayor: Werner Entner

Area
  - Total: 27.82 km^{2} (10.74 sq mi)
- Elevation: 534 m (1,752 ft)

Population (2021)
  - Total: 3,459
  - Density: 124.3/km^{2} (322.0/sq mi)
- Time zone: UTC+1 (CET)
  - Summer (DST): UTC+2 (CEST)
- Postal code: 6232
- Area code: 05337
- Vehicle registration: KU
- Website: www.muenster.at

Münster (German pronunciation: [ˈmʏnstɐ]) is a municipality in the Kufstein district in the Austrian state of Tyrol located 20 km west of Wörgl and 34 km southwest of Kufstein. It is the westernmost community of the district and lies at the northern side of the Inn River. The main sources of income are tourism, agriculture and a bottling factory for mineral water.
