= Rettenschöss =

- Municipality
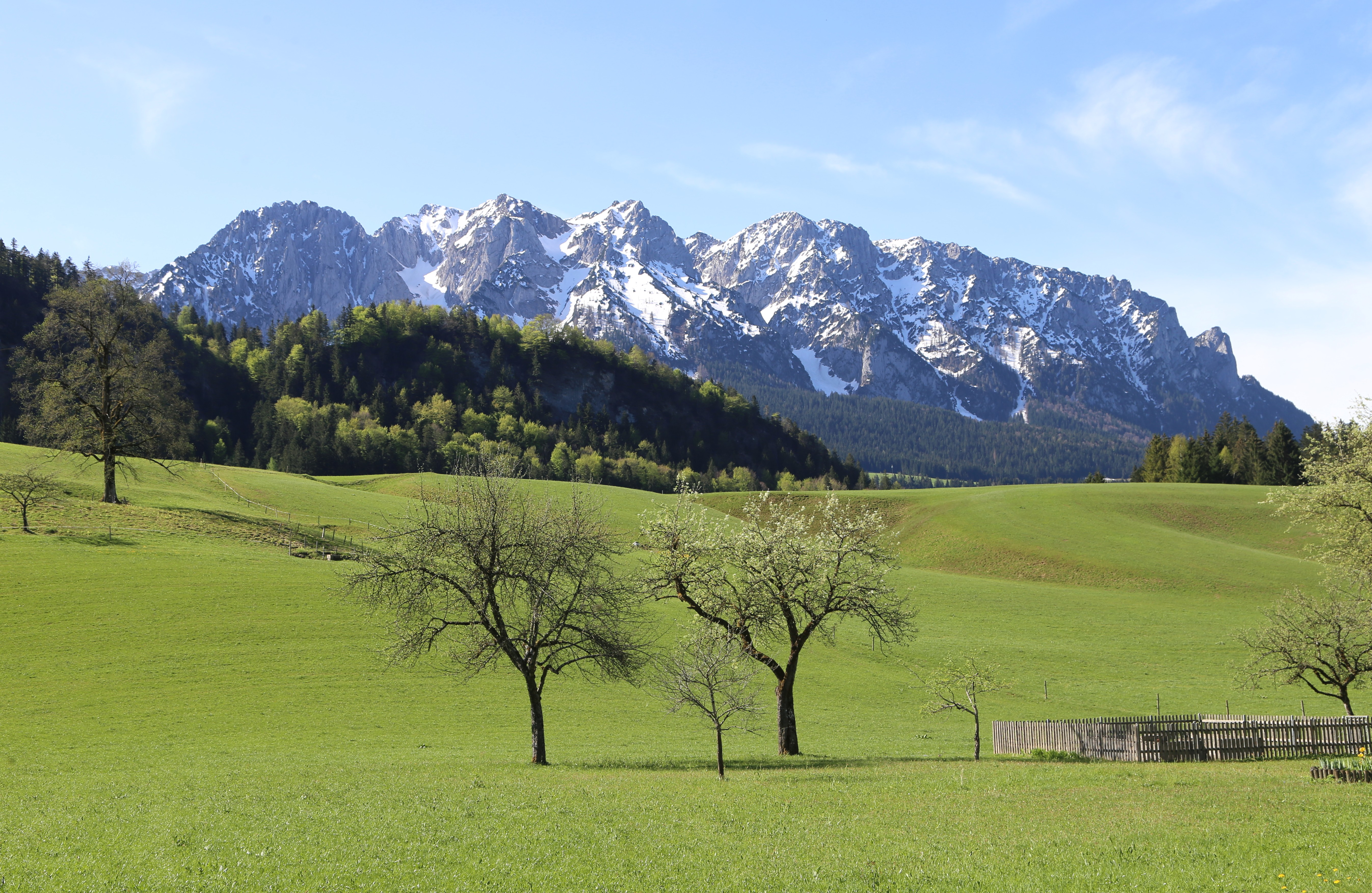

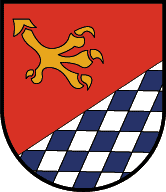
- Coat of arms

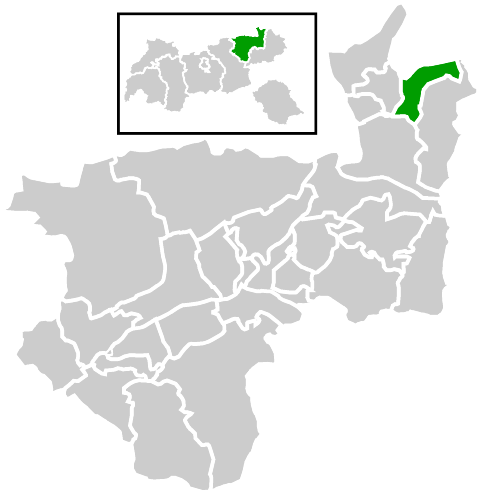
- Location within Kufstein district

- Location within Austria
- Coordinates: 47°39′00″N 12°16′00″E
- Country: Austria
- State: Tyrol
- District: Kufstein

Government
  - Mayor: Georg Kitzbichler

Area
  - Total: 16.27 km^{2} (6.28 sq mi)
- Elevation: 680 m (2,230 ft)

Population (2018-01-01)
  - Total: 513
  - Density: 31.5/km^{2} (81.7/sq mi)
- Time zone: UTC+1 (CET)
  - Summer (DST): UTC+2 (CEST)
- Postal code: 6347
- Area code: 05373
- Vehicle registration: KU
- Website: www.rettenschoess.at

Rettenschöss is a municipality in the Kufstein district in the Austrian state of Tyrol located 10.20 km northeast of Kufstein and 6 km northeast of Ebbs below the northern border to Bavaria, Germany.
