= Kufstein District =

Coordinates: 47.5°N 12.1°E

Kufstein District Bezirk Kufstein
- District
- Country: Austria
- State: Tyrol
- Number of municipalities: 30
- Administrative seat: Kufstein

Government
  - District Governor: Kurt Berek

Area
  - Total: 969.81 km^{2} (374.45 sq mi)

Population (2012)
  - Total: 101,321
  - Density: 104.48/km^{2} (270.59/sq mi)
- Time zone: UTC+01:00 (CET)
  - Summer (DST): UTC+02:00 (CEST)
- Vehicle registration: KU

The Bezirk Kufstein is an administrative district (bezirk) in Tyrol, Austria. It borders Bavaria (Germany) in the north, the Kitzbühel district in the southeast, and the Schwaz district in the southwest.

The district has a geographical area of 969.81 km^{2}, and a population of 101,321 (2012) giving a population density of 104 people per km^{2}. The administrative center is Kufstein.

The district comprises the lower part of the Tyrolean Inn valley as far as the Bavarian border, the Alpbach valley, the Brandenberg valley, Wildschönau, and Thiersee. Mountain ranges within the district include the Brandenberg Alps, Kitzbühel Alps, and the Kaisergebirge. The largest lakes are the Reintal lakes, Thiersee, Hechtsee, Hintersteiner See and Walchsee.

Historical population
Year	Pop.	±%
1869	27,032	—
1880	29,371	+8.7%
1890	31,296	+6.6%
1900	34,375	+9.8%
1910	39,598	+15.2%
1923	41,334	+4.4%
1934	44,834	+8.5%
1939	46,160	+3.0%
1951	56,093	+21.5%
1961	60,022	+7.0%
1971	70,875	+18.1%
1981	76,966	+8.6%
1991	84,627	+10.0%
2001	93,702	+10.7%
Source: Statistik Austria

== Administrative divisions ==
The district is divided into 30 municipalities, three of them are towns, and two of them are market towns.

=== Towns ===
1. Kufstein (17,550)
2. Rattenberg (405)
3. Wörgl (12,723)

=== Market towns ===
1. Brixlegg (2,809)
2. Kundl (3,967)

=== Municipalities ===
1. Alpbach (2,600)
2. Angath (946)
3. Angerberg (1,768)
4. Bad Häring (2,568)
5. Brandenberg (1,547)
6. Breitenbach am Inn (3,321)
7. Ebbs (5,239)
8. Ellmau (2,659)
9. Erl (1,452)
10. Kirchbichl (5,363)
11. Kramsach (4,609)
12. Langkampfen (3,707)
13. Mariastein (323)
14. Münster (3,044)
15. Niederndorf (2,631)
16. Niederndorferberg (673)
17. Radfeld (2,292)
18. Reith im Alpbachtal (2,673)
19. Rettenschöss (469)
20. Scheffau am Wilden Kaiser (1,323)
21. Schwoich (2,314)
22. Söll (3,556)
23. Thiersee (2,855)
24. Walchsee (1,789)
25. Wildschönau (4,146)
