= Thiersee =

- Municipality
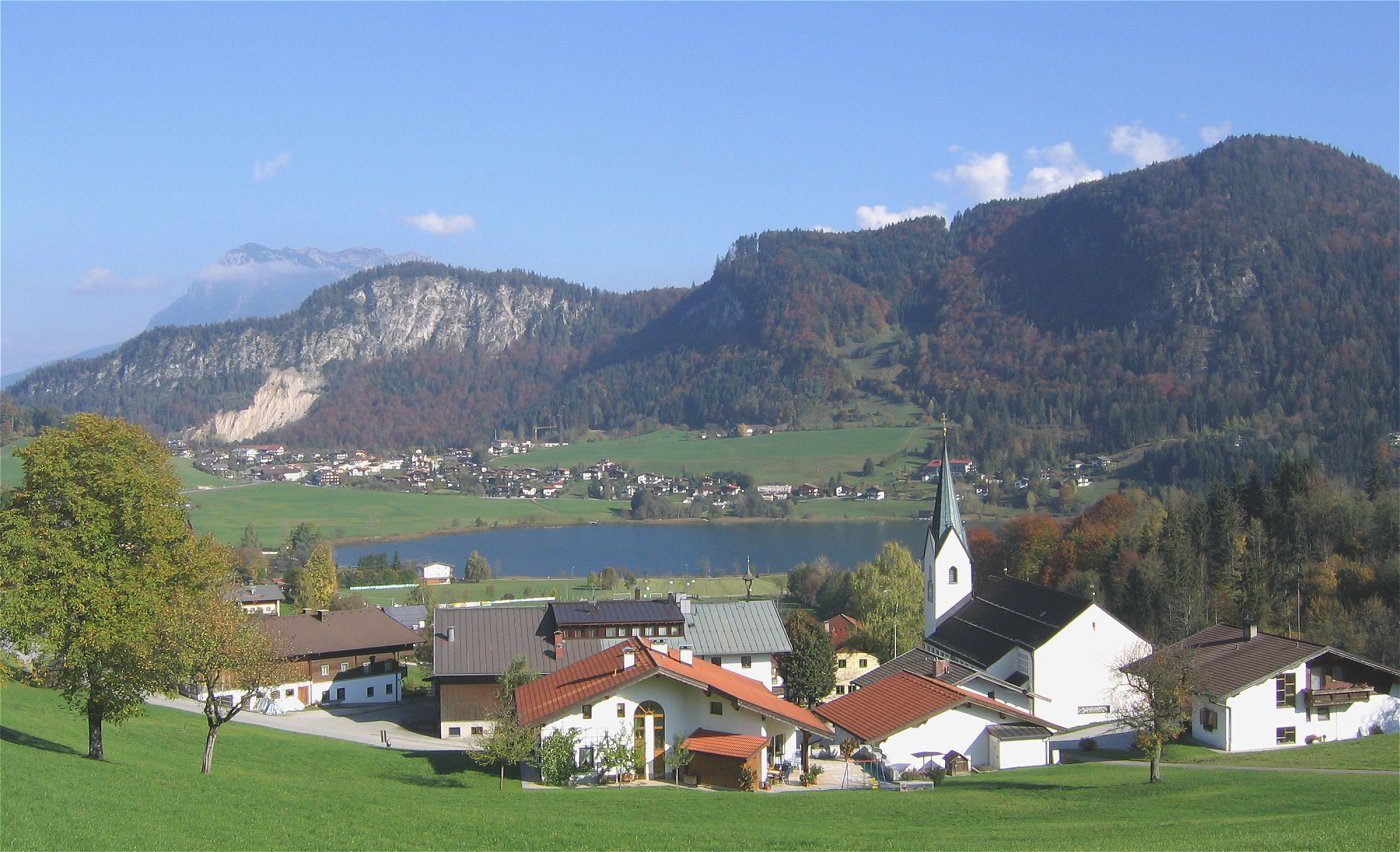
- Thiersee

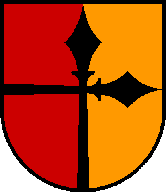
- Coat of arms

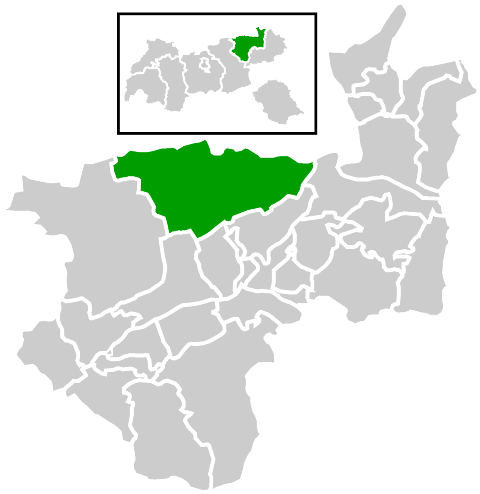
- Location within Kufstein district

- Location within Austria
- Coordinates: 47°34′00″N 12°05′00″E
- Country: Austria
- State: Tyrol
- District: Kufstein

Government
  - Mayor: Hannes Juffinger (ÖVP)

Area
  - Total: 108.6 km^{2} (41.9 sq mi)
- Elevation: 678 m (2,224 ft)

Population (2018-01-01)
  - Total: 2,990
  - Density: 27.5/km^{2} (71.3/sq mi)
- Time zone: UTC+1 (CET)
  - Summer (DST): UTC+2 (CEST)
- Postal code: 6335
- Area code: 05376
- Vehicle registration: KU
- Website: www.thiersee. tirol.gv.at

Thiersee is a large municipality in the Kufstein district in the Austrian state of Tyrol located 5 km west of Kufstein, below the northern border with Bavaria, Germany.

== Geography ==
The municipality is embedded in a hilly landscape with many forests and streams. Entities (Ortschaften) are (in brackets: inhabitants as of January 2023):

- Almen (0)
- Hinterthiersee (523), also a village
- Landl (494), also a village
- Mitterland (573)
- Schmiedtal (201)
- Vorderthiersee (1371), also a village

The village Thiersee was mentioned for the first time in documents in 1224 and belonged to Bavaria until 1504. At the beginning of the 20th century, it was a peasant community without concerning traffic engineering. A street from Kufstein to Thiersee was built during World War I.

From 1946 to 1952, the village was center of the Austrian film production. Main sources of income at present are agriculture, passion play and tourism.
