= Mariastein, Tyrol =

Mariastein
- Municipality
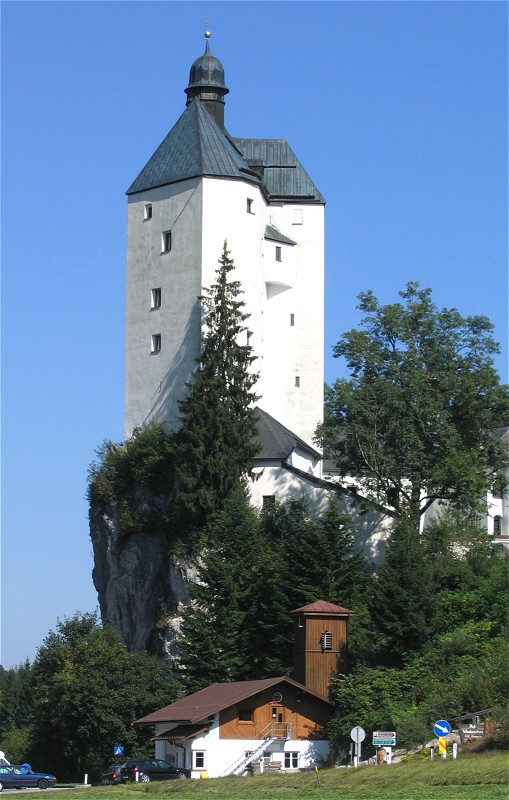

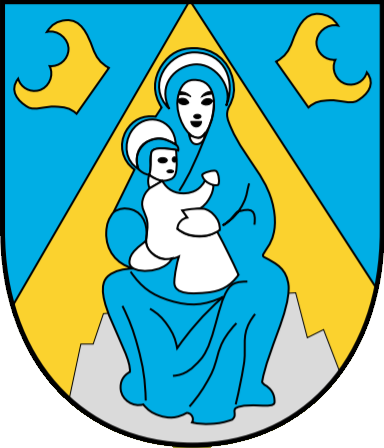
- Coat of arms

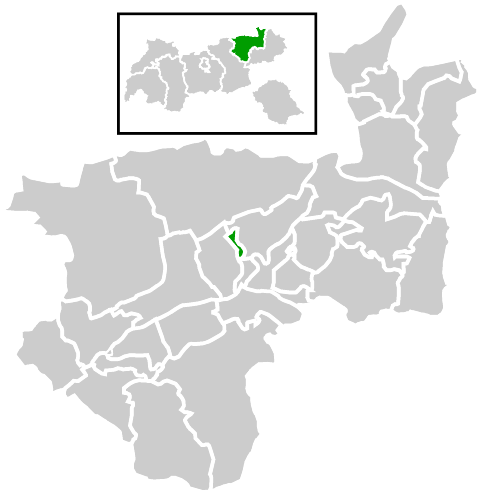
- Location within Kufstein district

- Location within Austria
- Coordinates: 47°31′31″N 12°03′13″E
- Country: Austria
- State: Tyrol
- District: Kufstein

Government
  - Mayor: Dieter Martinz

Area
  - Total: 2.37 km^{2} (0.92 sq mi)
- Elevation: 575 m (1,886 ft)

Population (2018-01-01)
  - Total: 362
  - Density: 153/km^{2} (396/sq mi)
- Time zone: UTC+1 (CET)
  - Summer (DST): UTC+2 (CEST)
- Postal code: 6324
- Area code: 05332
- Vehicle registration: KU
- Website: www.mariastein.gv.at

Mariastein is the smallest municipality in the Kufstein district in the Austrian state of Tyrol located 4 kilometers north of Wörgl and 11.5 kilometers southwest of Kufstein. Already a fifteenth century pilgrimage destination, it became more popular after a local statue of Mary, which had been removed to Bavaria in the late seventeenth century, was said to have returned to the church in Mariastein on its own.

At the center of the community is a 42-metre-tall Wohnturm, a castle built in the fourteenth century atop a rock outcropping, and which contains 250 stairs. It now houses multiple chapels and a museum.
