= Schwoich =

- Municipality
- View of Schwoich

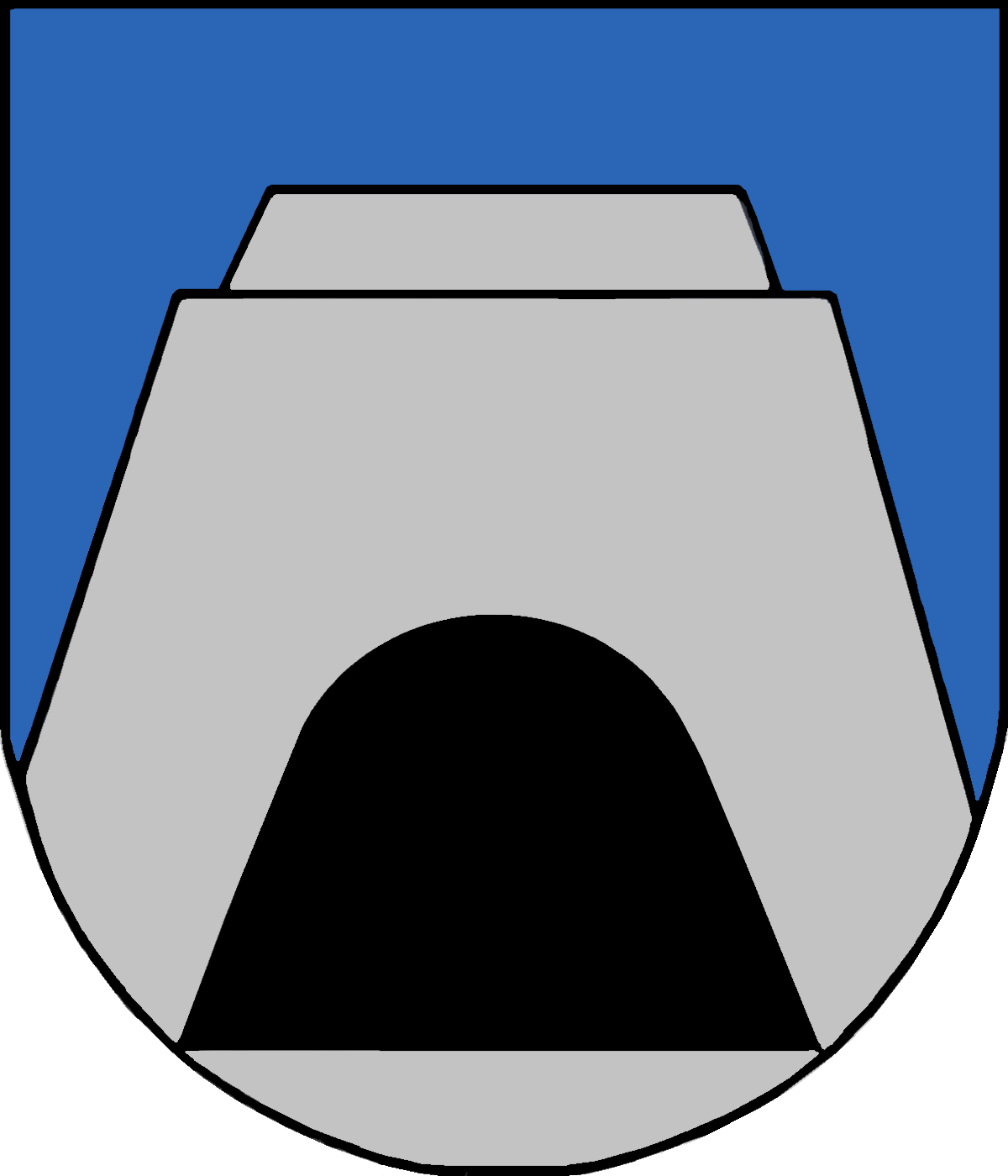
- Coat of arms

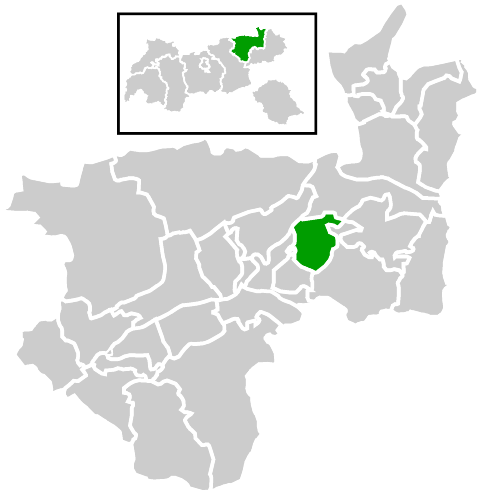
- Location within Kufstein district

- Location within Austria
- Coordinates: 47°33′00″N 12°08′00″E
- Country: Austria
- State: Tyrol
- District: Kufstein

Government
  - Mayor: Josef Dillersberger (ÖVP)

Area
  - Total: 18.79 km^{2} (7.25 sq mi)
- Elevation: 583 m (1,913 ft)

Population (2021)
  - Total: 2,562
  - Density: 136.3/km^{2} (353.1/sq mi)
- Time zone: UTC+1 (CET)
  - Summer (DST): UTC+2 (CEST)
- Postal code: 6334
- Area code: 05372
- Vehicle registration: KU
- Website: www.schwoich.tirol.gv.at

Schwoich is a municipality in the Kufstein district in the Austrian state of Tyrol located 5.50 km south of Kufstein on the southern bank of the Inn River. The village has nine hamlets. Settlement of the area began in the 6th century but the community was mentioned for the first time as "Swiuch / Schweng" in 1280.

The area became famous because of a large deposit of blueberries. Other important sources of income are cement industry and tourism (particularly associated with sport activities).

The municipality is a member of the Kufsteinerland Tourism Association.
