= Niederndorf (Austria) =

- Municipality
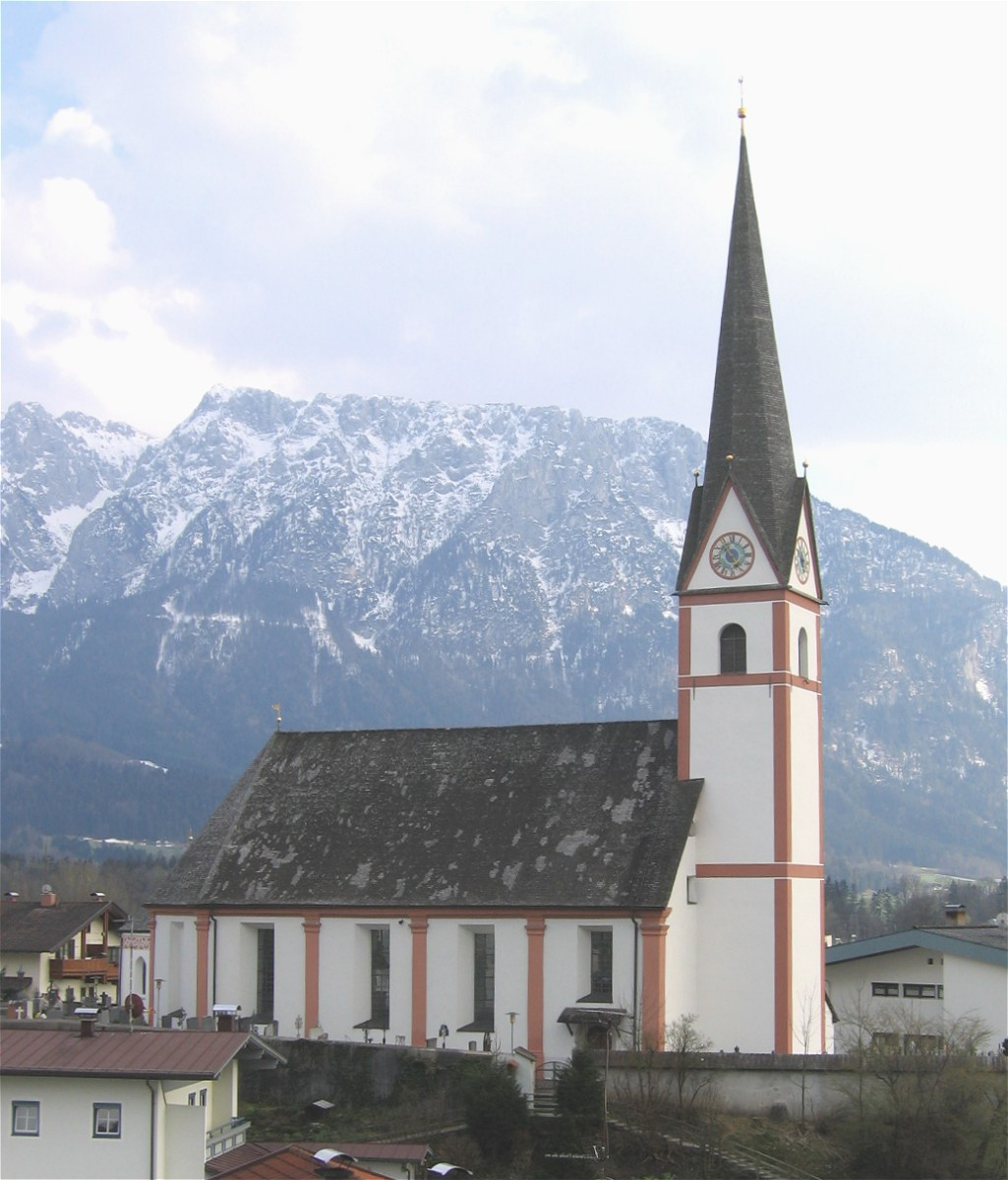

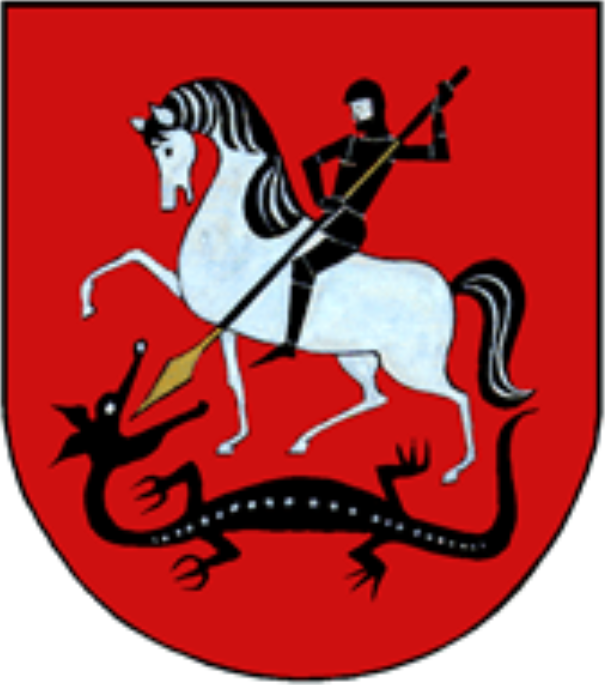
- Coat of arms

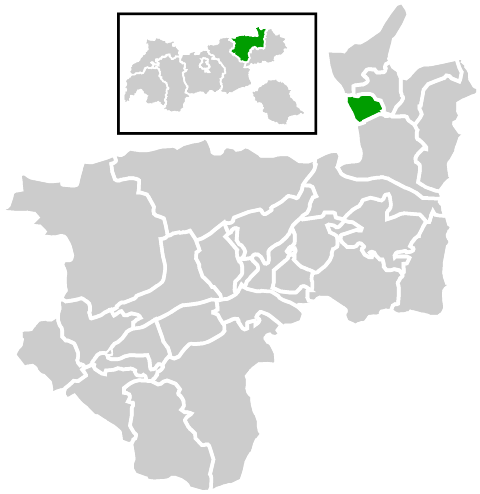
- Location within Kufstein district

- Location within Austria
- Coordinates: 47°39′00″N 12°12′56″E
- Country: Austria
- State: Tyrol
- District: Kufstein

Government
  - Mayor: Christian Ritzer

Area
  - Total: 7.21 km^{2} (2.78 sq mi)
- Elevation: 500 m (1,600 ft)

Population (2021)
  - Total: 2,820
  - Density: 391/km^{2} (1,010/sq mi)
- Time zone: UTC+1 (CET)
  - Summer (DST): UTC+2 (CEST)
- Postal code: 6342
- Area code: 05373
- Vehicle registration: KU
- Website: www.niederndorf.tirol.gv.at

Niederndorf is a municipality in the Kufstein district in the Austrian state of Tyrol located 7 km north of Kufstein and 2 km north above Ebbs near the border to Bavaria, Germany. The main source of income is agriculture. The village was mentioned for the first time in documents in 1230.
