= Niederndorferberg =

- Municipality
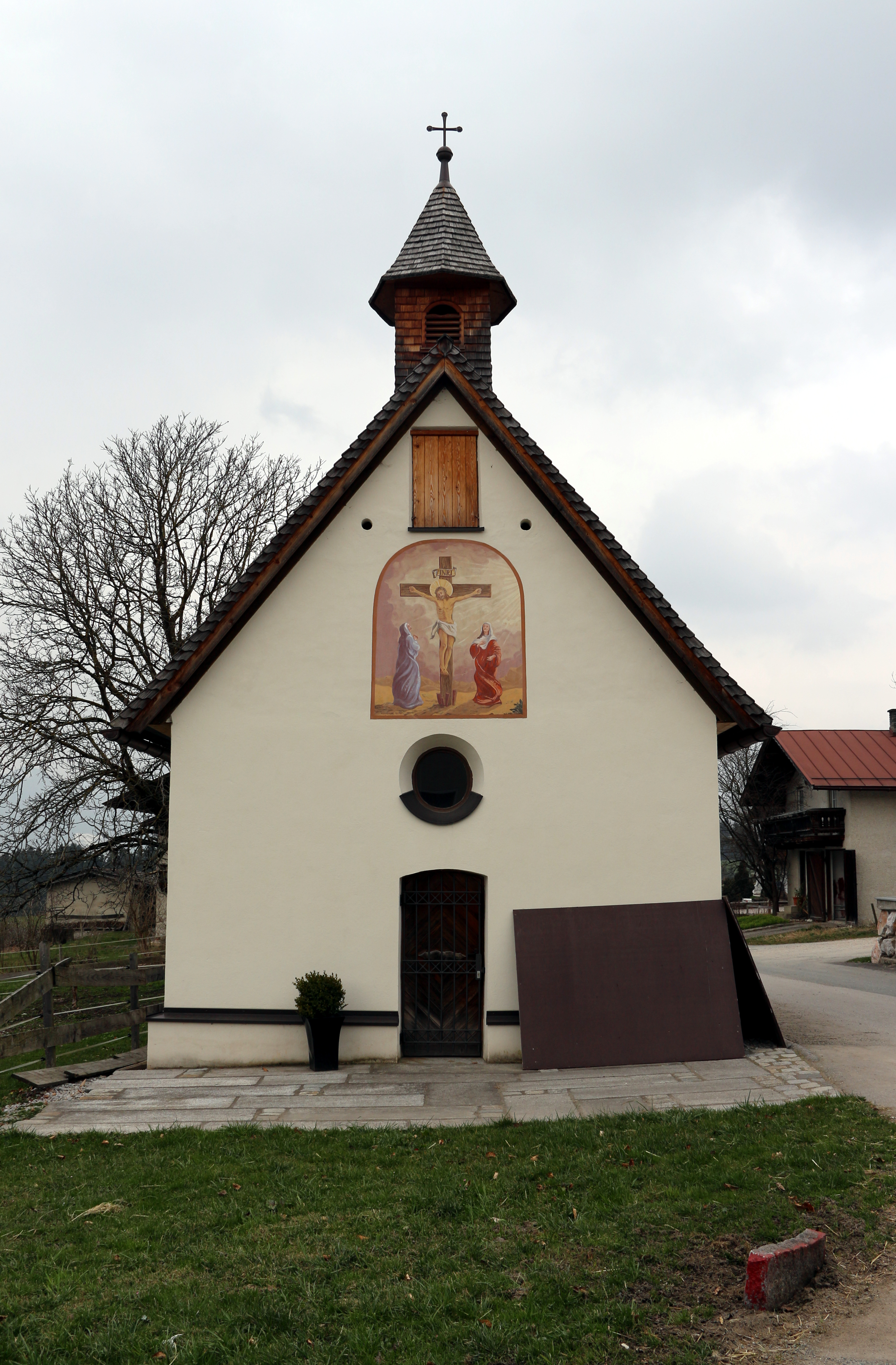
- Noppenberg chapel in Niederndorferberg

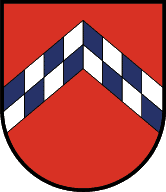
- Coat of arms

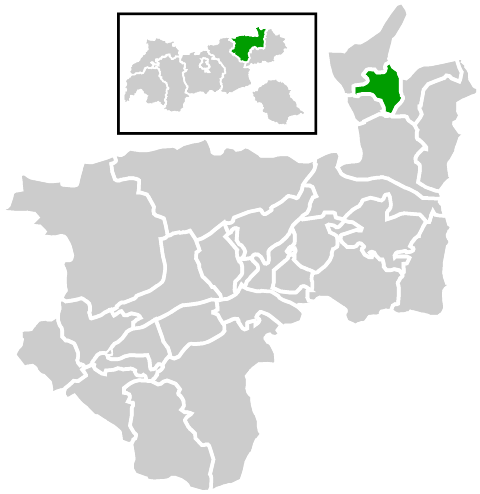
- Location within Kufstein district

- Location within Austria
- Coordinates: 47°40′34″N 12°15′24″E
- Country: Austria
- State: Tyrol
- District: Kufstein

Government
  - Mayor: Wolfgang Baumgartner (ALN)

Area
  - Total: 12.14 km^{2} (4.69 sq mi)
- Elevation: 738 m (2,421 ft)

Population (2021)
  - Total: 720
  - Density: 59/km^{2} (150/sq mi)
- Time zone: UTC+1 (CET)
  - Summer (DST): UTC+2 (CEST)
- Postal code: 6342
- Area code: 05373
- Vehicle registration: KU
- Website: www.riskommunal.net/ niederndorferberg

Niederndorferberg is a municipality in the Kufstein district in the Austrian state of Tyrol located 8 km north of Kufstein and 3.4 km north above Ebbs near the border to Bavaria, Germany. It has six parts and was once connected with Niederndorf before it became an own community. The main source of income is the production of milk & cheese.
