= Radfeld =

- Municipality
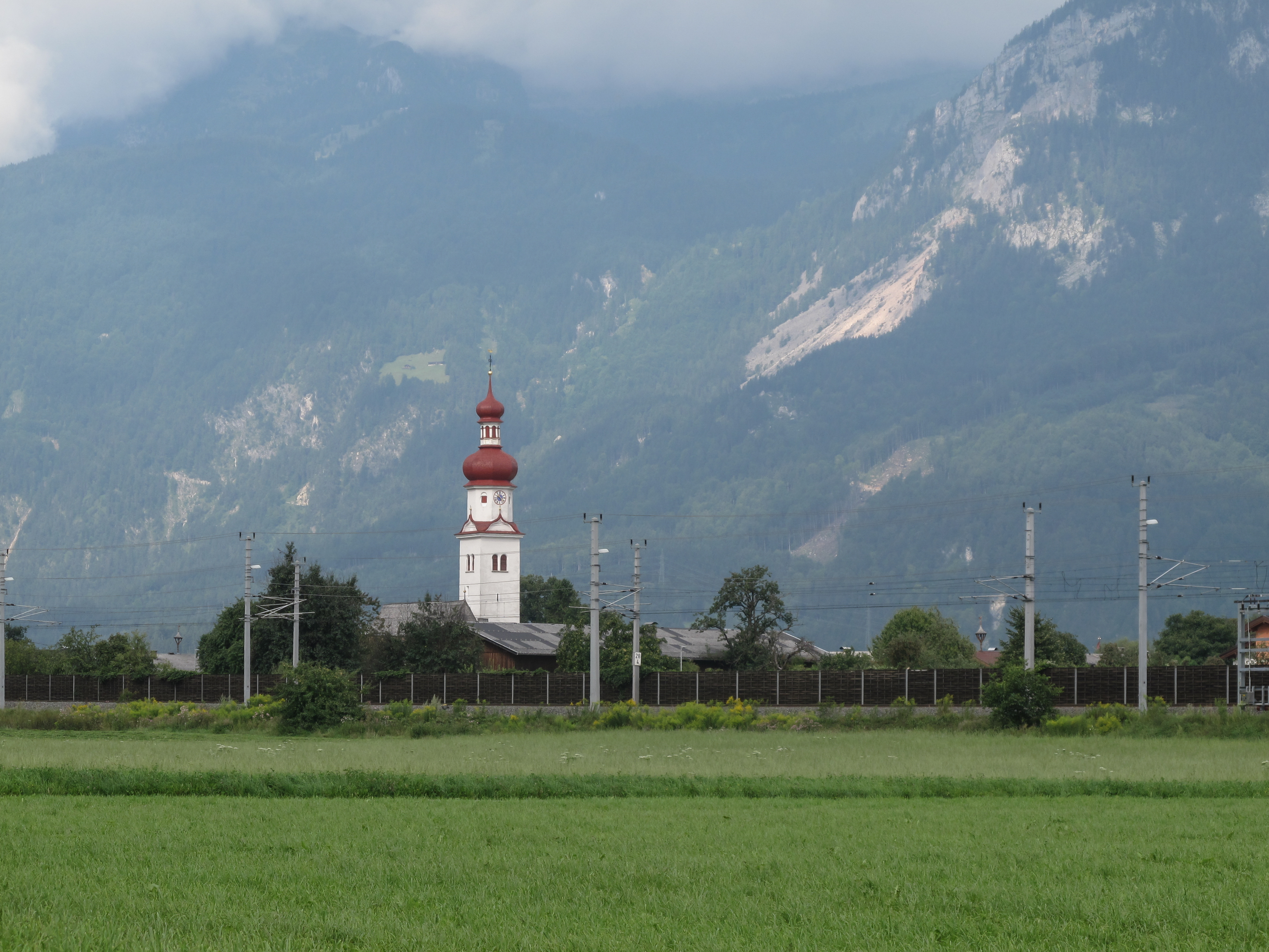

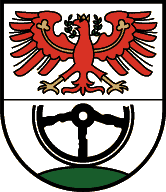
- Coat of arms

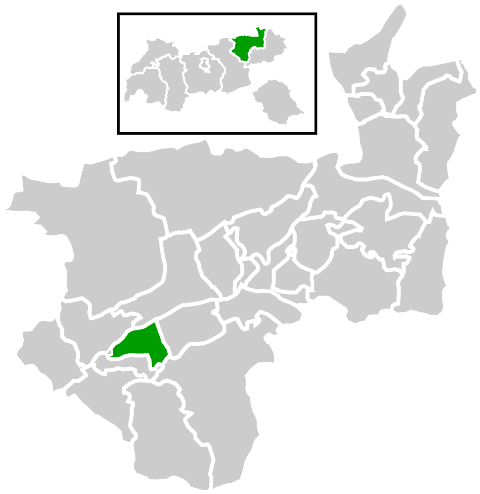
- Location within Kufstein district

- Location within Austria
- Coordinates: 47°26′46″N 11°54′41″E
- Country: Austria
- State: Tyrol
- District: Kufstein

Government
  - Mayor: Josef Auer (Zukunft für Radfeld)

Area
  - Total: 14.32 km^{2} (5.53 sq mi)
- Elevation: 512 m (1,680 ft)

Population (2021)
  - Total: 2,551
  - Density: 178.1/km^{2} (461.4/sq mi)
- Time zone: UTC+1 (CET)
  - Summer (DST): UTC+2 (CEST)
- Postal code: 6241
- Area code: +43 5337
- Vehicle registration: KU
- Website: www.radfeld.tirol.gv.at

Radfeld is a municipality in the Kufstein district in the Austrian state of Tyrol located 1 km east of the town of Rattenberg, 13 km west of Wörgl, and 24 km southwest of Kufstein.

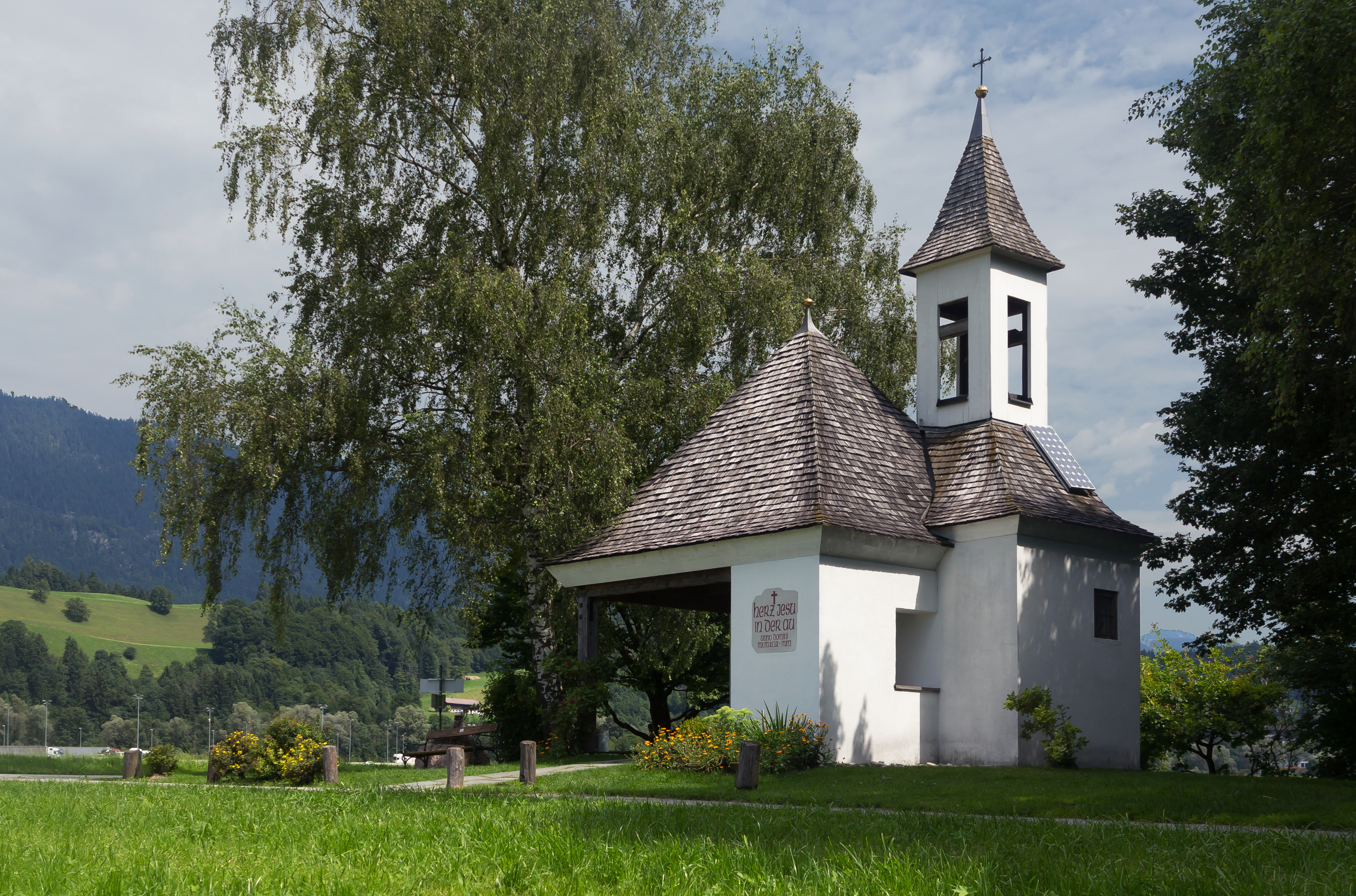
Radfeld, chapel: die Schützenkapelle Herz-Jesu in der Au
