= Breitenbach am Inn =

Breitenbach am Inn Broadnbåch am Inn
- Municipality
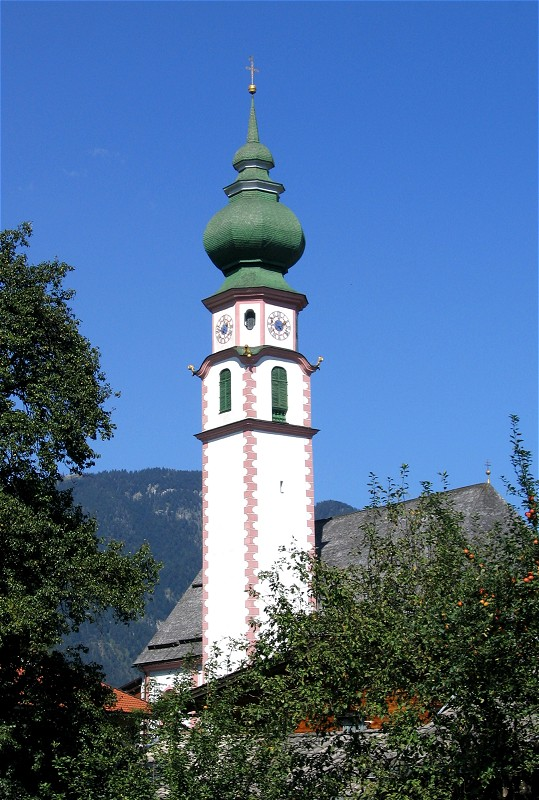
- Breitenbach parish church

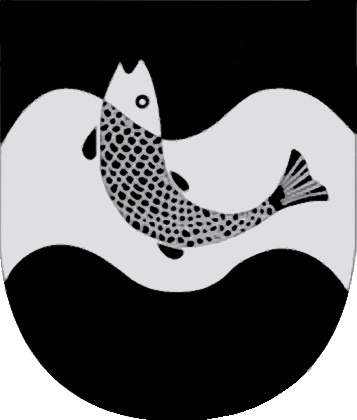
- Coat of arms

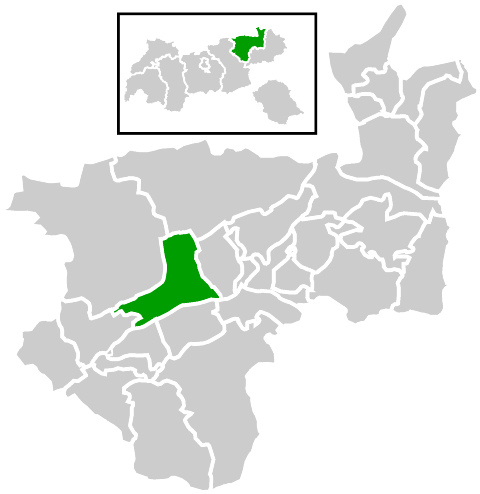
- Location within Kufstein district

- Location within Austria
- Coordinates: 47°28′44″N 11°58′24″E
- Country: Austria
- State: Tyrol
- District: Kufstein

Government
  - Mayor: Alois Margreiter (ÖVP)

Area
  - Total: 37.99 km^{2} (14.67 sq mi)
- Elevation: 510 m (1,670 ft)

Population (2025-01-01)
  - Total: 3,563
  - Density: 93.79/km^{2} (242.9/sq mi)
- Time zone: UTC+1 (CET)
  - Summer (DST): UTC+2 (CEST)
- Postal code: 6252
- Area code: +43 5338
- Vehicle registration: KU
- Website: breitenbach. tirol.gv.at

Breitenbach am Inn (Central Bavarian: Broadnbåch am Inn) is a municipality in the Kufstein district in the Austrian state of Tyrol located 5.5 km west of Wörgl and 19 km southwest of Kufstein. The village has five parts and received new parts and house numbers in 2006. It was founded in the middle of the 19th century.

The lake Berglsteiner See is located in the municipality of Breitenbach am Inn.

== History ==
Shortly before 800 AD Breitenbach has been mentioned as "Mensalpfarre" for the monk's cell in Kufstein, the parish church of St. Peter is one of the oldest churches in Tyrol. Breitenbach is one of three Freising's "Urpfarren" in Tyrol. Breitenbach occurs relatively late on documents, for the first time in 1157 as a parish of the panel Kanonikerstift St. Andrae in Freising. The original boundaries of the ancient and mother parish Breitenbach include the areas of the parishes Brandenberg, Steinberg, Mariatal, Voldöpp and Mosen (Kramsach), all of which until 1891 was eliminated permanently from this association. 739-1818 of the Inn formed by the confluence of the Habach (between Munster and Kramsach) to Kufstein, the boundary between the territory of the Archdiocese of Salzburg in the right and that of Freising on the left bank of the river. With the ecclesiastical territorial division was accompanied by the secular and more than 900 years, from the Bavarian land acquisition by the year 1504, Breitenbach shared the fortunes of the Duchy of Bavaria.

Breitenbach was originally a purely agricultural village which largely provided itself. What was needed, and was not available in the local area, was delivered by ship on the river Inn. That there is also a "Schopper establishment" was (repair shop for Innschiffe) in Breitenbach proves is still the name "Schopper host". In the years around 1860, resulting on the south side of the Inn Railway caused a tremendous economic development, was initially excluded from the Breitenbach because of the absence of a bridge. If you wanted to get from Breitenbach on the other river side to Kundl, so it was only a "Überfuhr" (ferry). In 1894, the council negotiations to build a bridge, and in 1896 it was opened. The municipality Breitenbach is within its limits since the mid-19th Century and is located next to the main village of Breitenbach through the wide scatter location of their hamlet. Previously, there were three elementary schools, today only two and a secondary school.

Coat of Arms three-dimensional emblem on the roundabout, in the background the inn Schopper

== Population ==
Historical population
Year	Pop.	±%
1869	1,050	—
1880	1,068	+1.7%
1890	1,052	−1.5%
1900	1,046	−0.6%
1910	1,176	+12.4%
1923	1,211	+3.0%
1934	1,381	+14.0%
1939	1,402	+1.5%
1951	1,573	+12.2%
1961	1,699	+8.0%
1971	2,048	+20.5%
1981	2,393	+16.8%
1991	2,663	+11.3%
2001	3,150	+18.3%
2013	3,330	+5.7%
2018	3,475	+4.4%

== Coat of arms ==
By order of the Tyrolean provincial government of 23 July 1963 the municipality Breitenbach was awarded today's coat of arms. Coat Description:. "In the black box, a silver cross river with a right ascending, changing color, silver and black fish, the silver transverse flow indicates the trickling through the village stream which also always the name of the town determinant and its abundance of fish for this was important.
