= Ebbs =

- Municipality
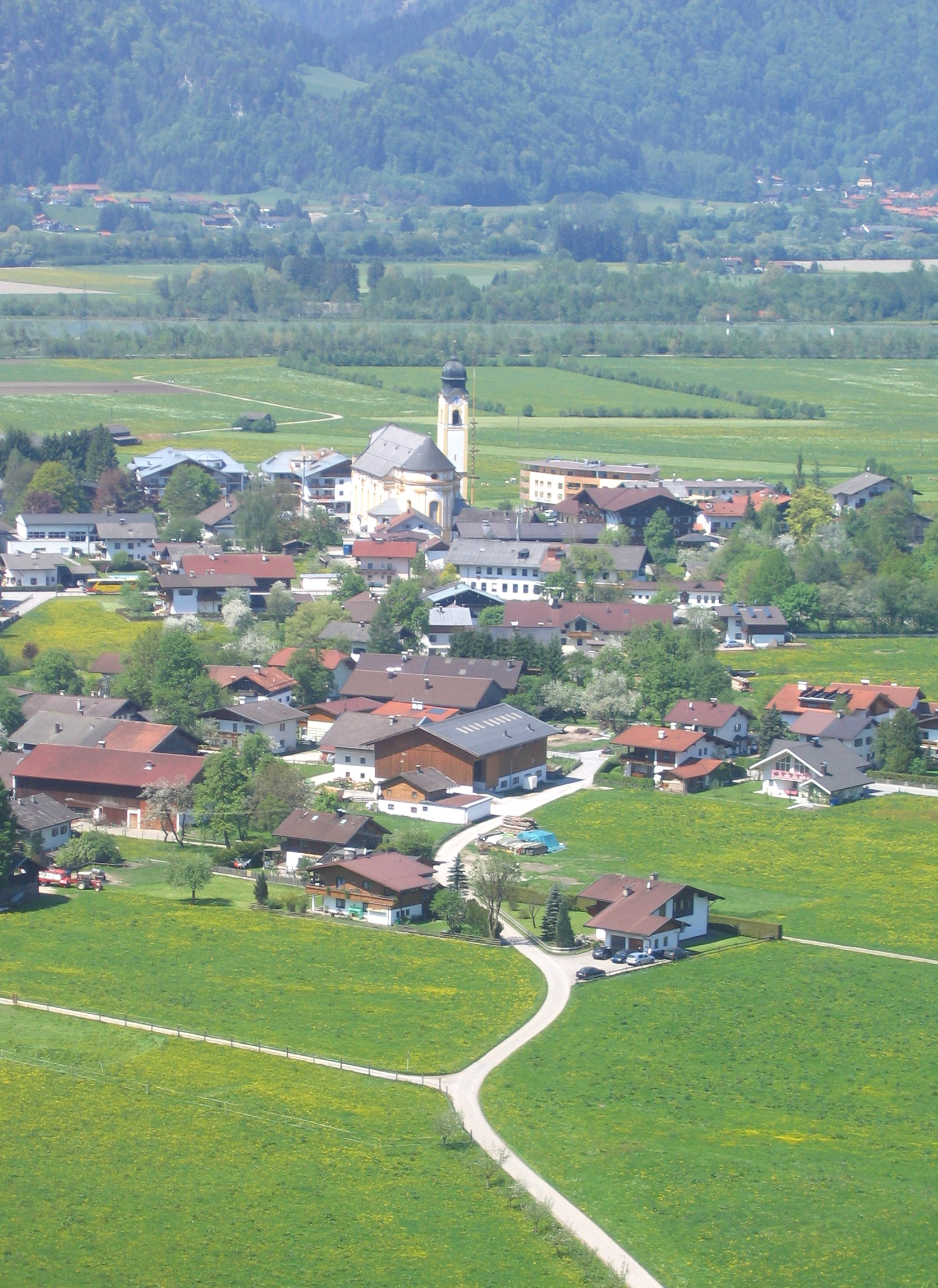
- Ebbs

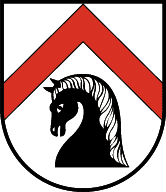
- Coat of arms

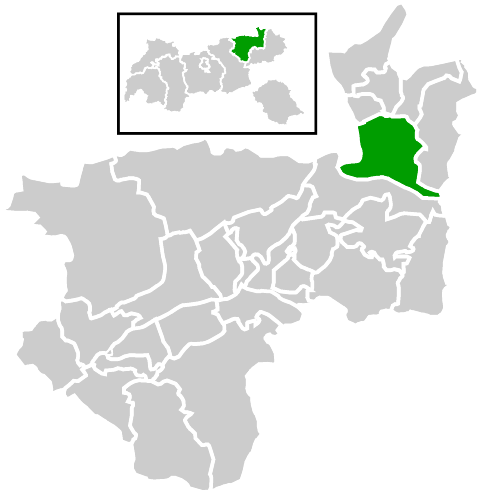
- Location within Kufstein district

- Location within Austria
- Coordinates: 47°37′48″N 12°12′52″E
- Country: Austria
- State: Tyrol
- District: Kufstein

Government
  - Mayor: Josef Ritzer (ÖVP)

Area
  - Total: 40.08 km^{2} (15.47 sq mi)
- Elevation: 475 m (1,558 ft)

Population (2018-01-01)
  - Total: 5,601
  - Density: 139.7/km^{2} (361.9/sq mi)
- Time zone: UTC+1 (CET)
  - Summer (DST): UTC+2 (CEST)
- Postal code: 6341
- Area code: 05373
- Vehicle registration: KU
- Website: www.ebbs.tirol.gv.at

Ebbs is a municipality in the Kufstein district of Tyrol in Austria. The village is located in the Judicial district of Kufstein and in 2016 had a population of 5,480.

== Geography ==
Ebbs is located in the Lower Inn Valley near Kufstein, to the east of the Inn river at the foot of the Kaiser Mountains. Ebbs is among the largest municipalities in the Kufstein district and one of the largest villages in Tyrol. At 475 m above sea level, it is also the lowest village in Tyrol. The Inn forms the border with Bavaria, Germany.
