= Weißache =

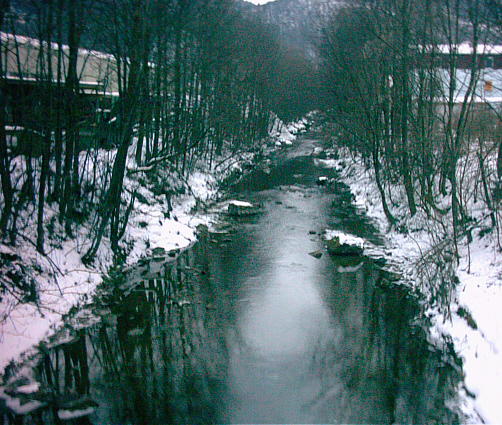
- The Weißache in its lower reaches near Kufstein

Location
- Country: Austria
- State: Tyrol

Physical characteristics
- Source
  - location: Zinsberggrund in Ellmau
  - elevation: ca. 1,600 m (AA)
- Mouth
  - location: In Kufstein into the Inn
  - coordinates: 47°34′32″N 12°09′14″E
  - elevation: ca. 500 m (AA)
- Length: 24.2 km (15.0 mi)

Basin features
- Progression: Inn→ Danube→ Black Sea
- Landmarks: Small towns: Söll, Kufstein

The Weißache is a river of Tyrol, Austria, a right tributary of the Inn.

The Weißache flows in the Sölllandl, a valley between the Kaiser Mountains and the Hohe Salve. It rises at about 1,600 m (AA) on the Zinsberggrund in the Weißachergraben and discharges in Endach, a district of Kufstein, into the Inn.

The Ache flows through the following municipalities (in downstream order): Ellmau, Scheffau, Söll, Schwoich, Kufstein.

Before the road Eibergstraße branches off to Schwoich, the river is divided and a larger part is pumped under the hill Kufsteiner Waldt into a heat-only boiler station south of Kufsteins and acts as cooling water, before it flows back on a natural course into the Inn. Between Egerbach (a district of Schwoich) and Endach (a district of Kufstein) the remaining part of the Weißache flows for about 800 m (2,600 ft) through a long gully, before it exits from the valley and heads northwest towards the Inn. This part discharges into the Inn around two kilometres (1.2 mi) after the boiler station.

In 2005 numerous measures were taken in Kufstein to reinforce the banks. The stream has cut ever deeper in the past years which could cause its banks to collapse.
