= Sölllandl =

Region in Tirol

Coordinates: 47°30′44″N 12°16′06″E

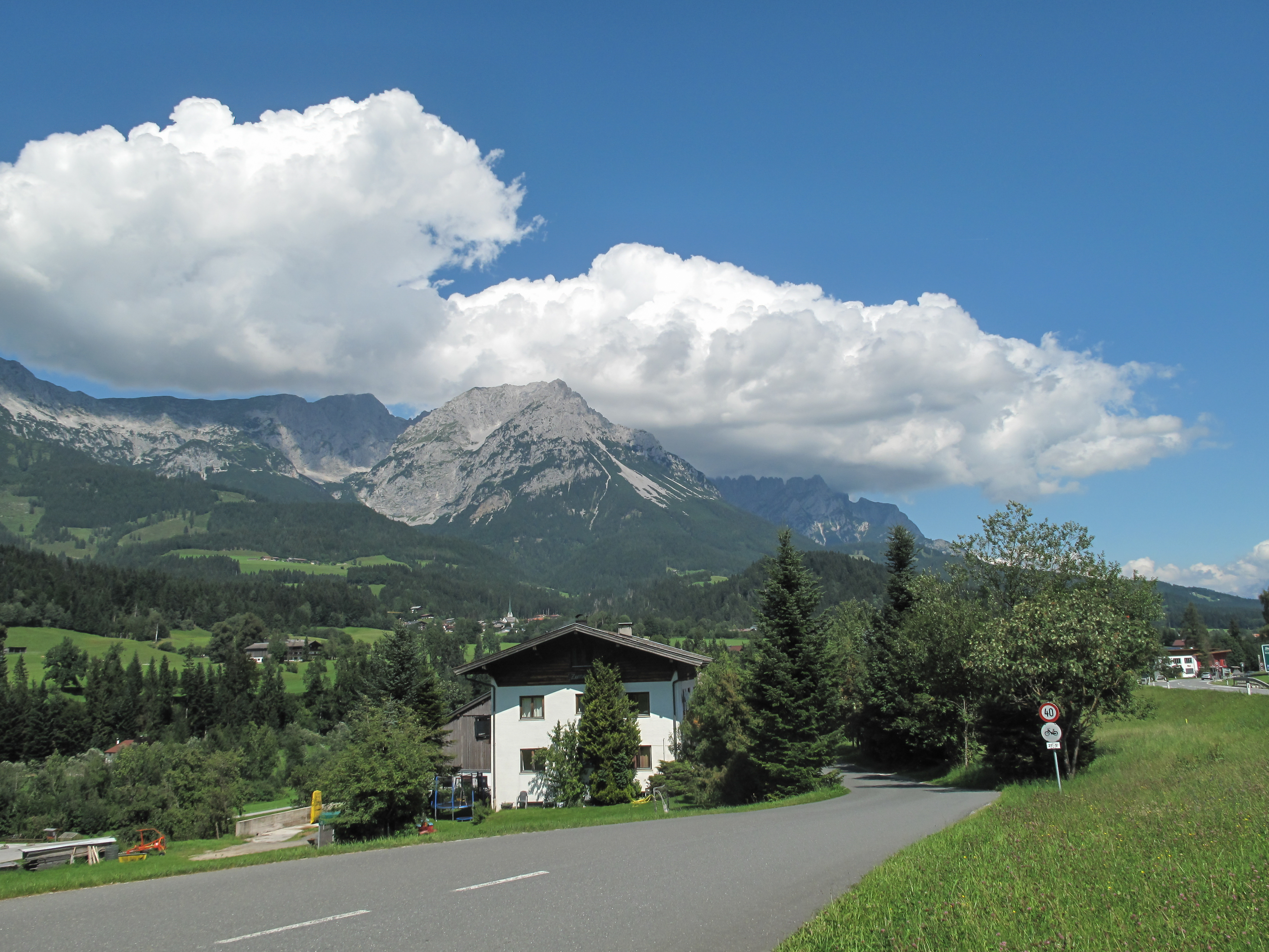
Sölllandl near Ellmau in Tyrol, Austria

Sölllandl (also Söllandl or Sölland) is a valley and geographical region located in Tyrol, Austria that covers the villages of Söll (Tirol), Scheffau am Wilden Kaiser, Ellmau, and Going am Wilden Kaiser in the Tyrolean Unterland between Wörgl and St. Johann in Tirol.

The Sölllandl includes the watersheds near Söll between the rivers Inn and Großache on one side and part of the Kitzbühler Ache on the other. Sölllandl divides the limestone alps of the Pölven and the Wilder Kaiser to the north from the slate mountains of the greywacke zone of the Kitzbühel Alps and the Hohe Salve away to the west.

The river Weißache, which rises south of Ellmau, drains the central region of the Sölllandl, turns shortly before Söll, accompanied by the Eiberg road, then to the north towards the Inn. The western part is drained by the Luecher Bach before it joins the Brixentaler Ache above Wörgl. The Reither Ache, coming from the south and fed by the Goinger Hausbach, which descends from the Wochenbrunner Alp, flows to St. Johann into the Großache in the Leukental.

The landscape is an important east-west link, through which the Loferer Bundesstraße (federal road) runs.
