= Pillersee Valley =

Valley in Austria

Coordinates: 47°29′11″N 12°31′51″E

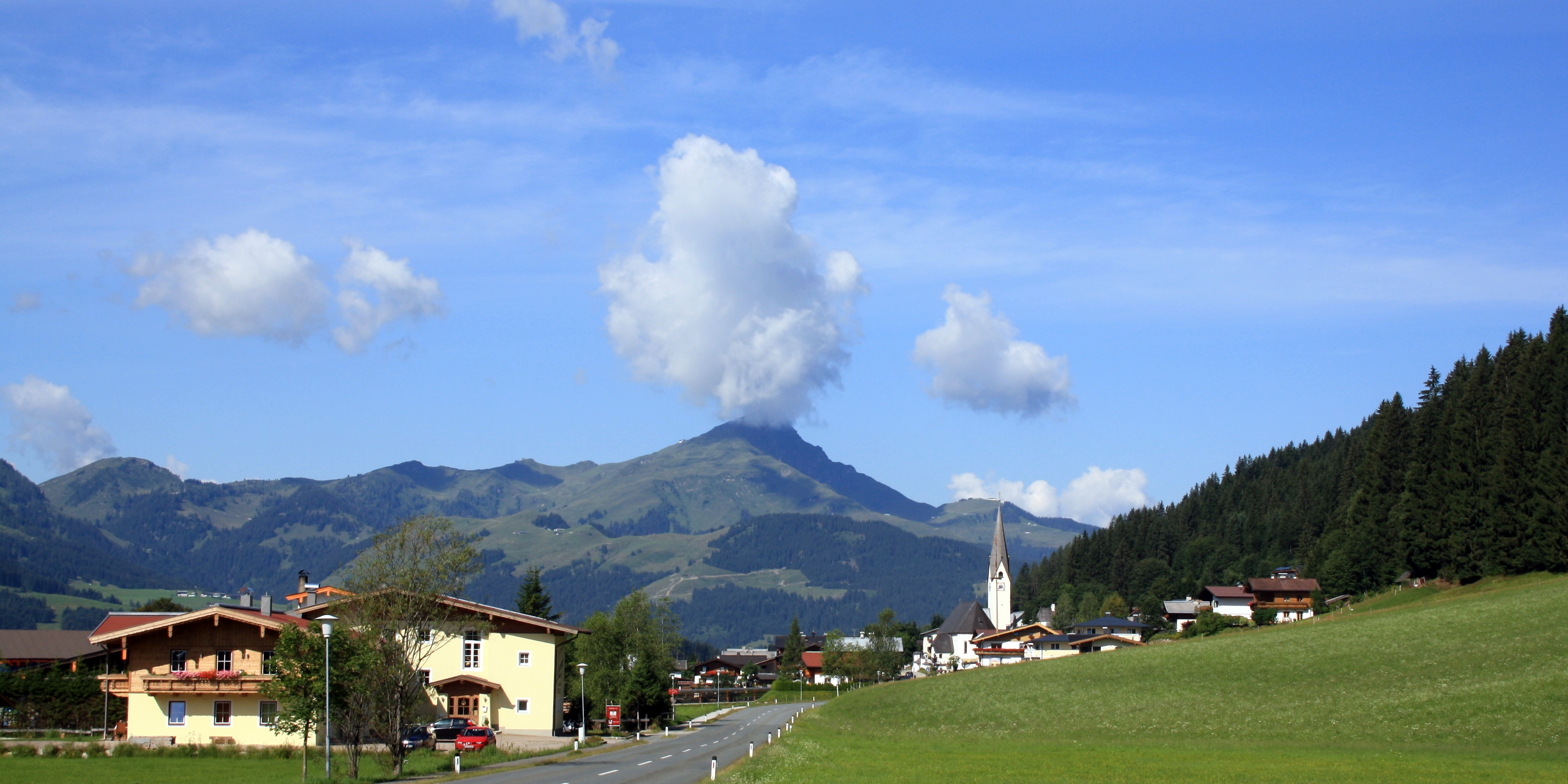
Pillersee Valley near St. Jakob in Haus in Tyrol, Austria

The Pillersee Valley (German: Pillerseetal) is a valley in the district of Kitzbühel in the Austrian state of Tyrol, on the border with Salzburg state.

== Location and landscape ==
Pillersee Valley (Austria)

The Pillersee Valley is characterised, like its neighbouring valleys, by a concise valley-floor watershed near St. Jakob in Haus, where the two river valleys of the Pillerseetal meet:
The northern valley branch drains through the Grieselbach, Pillersee and Loferbach (Haselbach) streams into the Saalach/Salzach, and is bounded by the Öfenschlucht gorge (the Teufelsklamm), part of the Strubtal valley of the Loferbach stream near Waidring.

In the south, the entire east–west running valley of the Rothache and Fieberbrunner Ache (Pillersee Ache) rivers, from the Grießen Pass in the east to the parish boundary between Fieberbrunn and St. Johann in Tirol in the west, also counts as part of the Pillersee Valley. St. Johann, where the Fieberbrunner Ache empties into the Großache (Kitzbühler-/Kössenerache, eventually becoming the Tiroler Ache tributary of the Inn), is the junction with the Leukental valley of the River Großache. The Grießen Pass is the transition to the east into the Salzburg Leogang.

The Pillersee Valley is bordered by the Loferer Steinberge mountains and the eastern foothills of the Leoganger Steinberge (Kirchel, Buchensteinwand) in the east and by the Kirchbergstock (also part of the Leoganger und Loferer Steinberge mountains) in the west. In the south the edge of valley is delineated by the Kitzbühel Alps. As a result, the Pillersee Valley lies on the geological boundary between the Northern Limestone Alps and the Slate Alps (Tyrolean "grass mountains"), made of grauwacke, in the south.

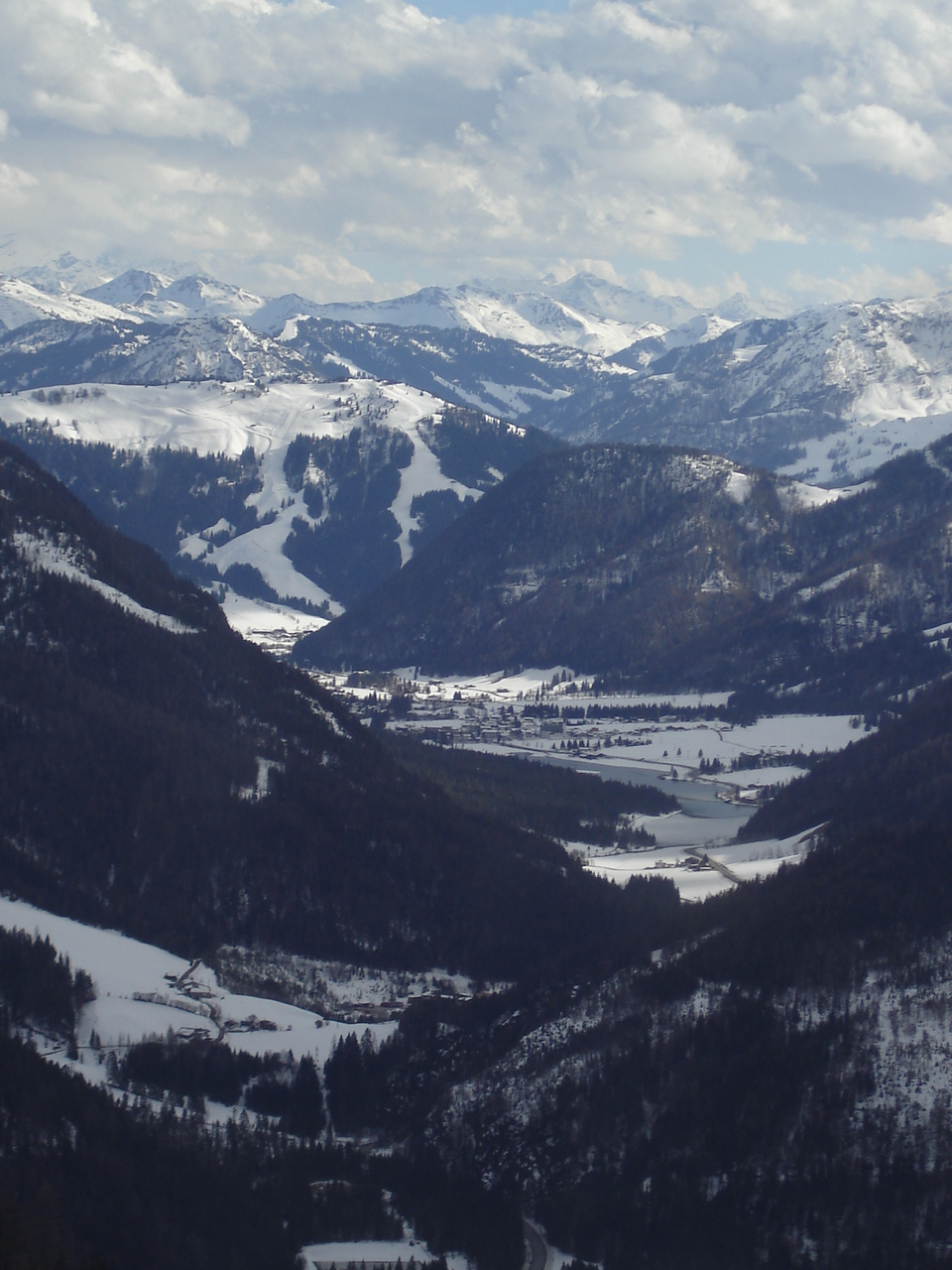
The Pillersee in winter

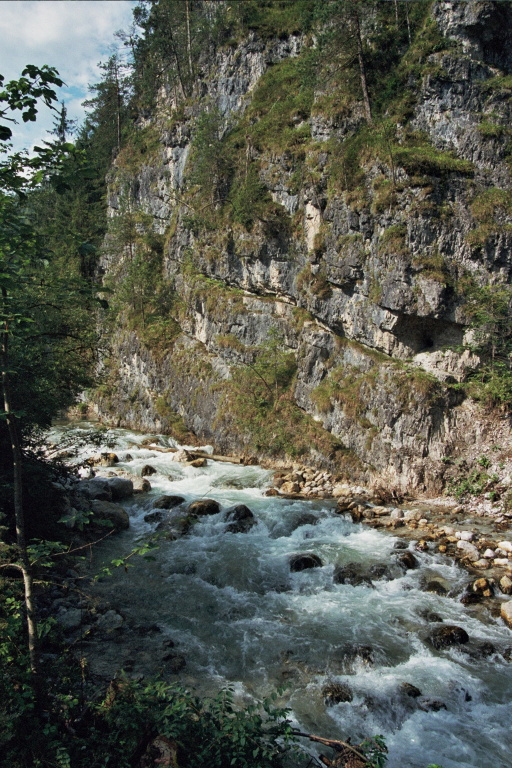
The Haselbach in the Öfenschlucht gorge

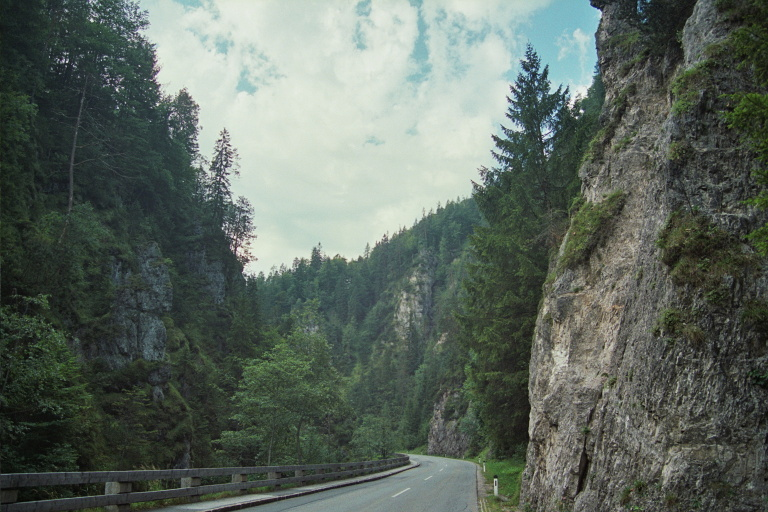
The Öfenschlucht

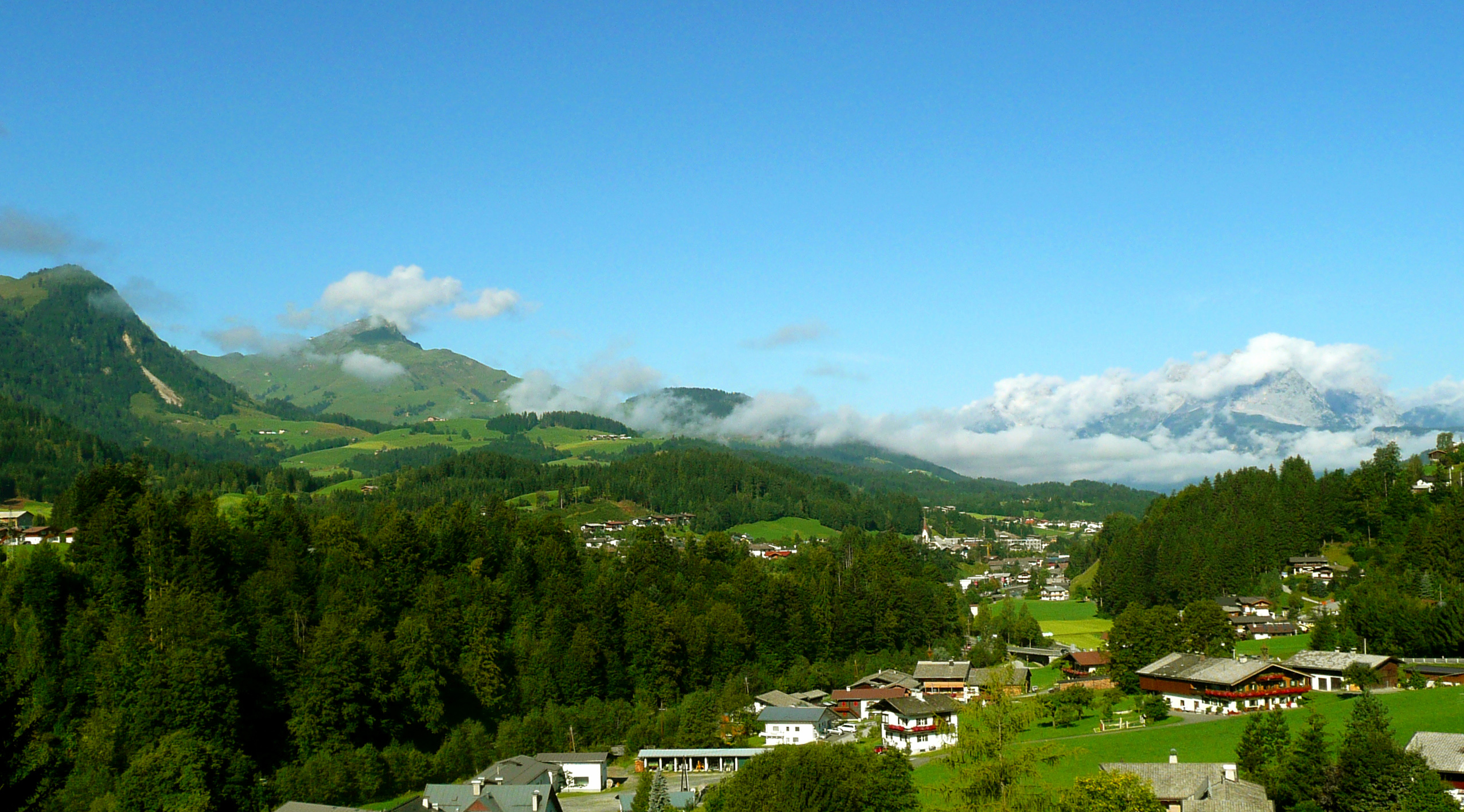
Near Fieberbrunn view of the Kitzbüheler Horn (left) from 9 km east in the Pillersee Valley, Wilder Kaiser in clouds (right)

== Municipalities in the Pillersee Valley ==
The municipalities in the Pillersee Valley are:

- Fieberbrunn
- Hochfilzen
- St. Ulrich am Pillersee
- St. Jakob in Haus
- Waidring

== Transport ==
The Hochkönigstraße (B 164) and the Salzburg-Tyrolean Railway (both from Saalfelden run through the southern part of the valley; the former to St. Johann, the latter to Kitzbühel–Wörgl). To the north the Pillerseestraße is the link to the Loferer Straße (B 178, Little German Corner–Wörgl).

== Panorama ==
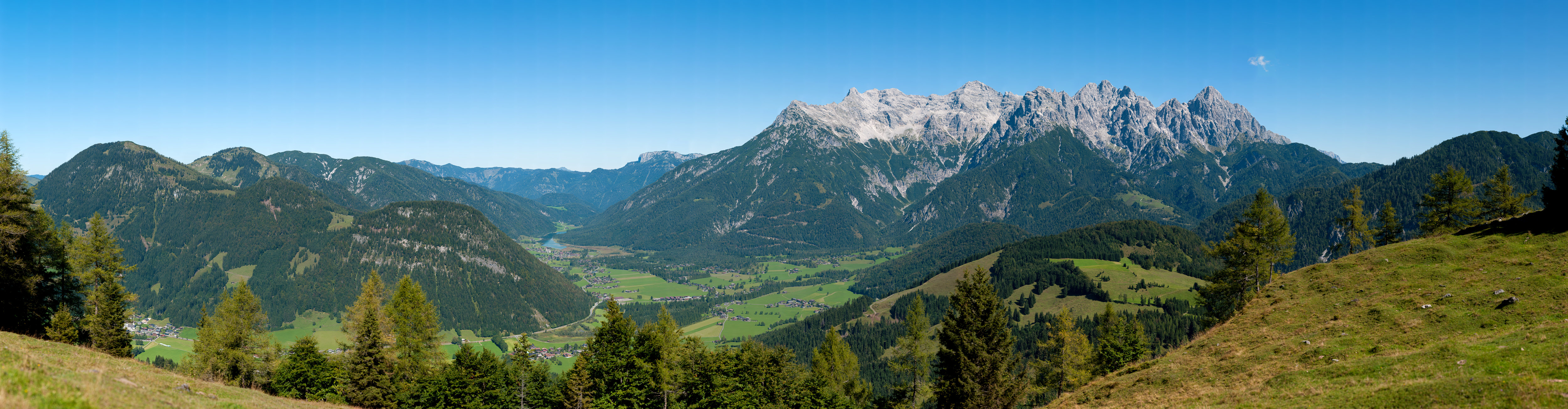
