= Tierbach =

Tierbach may refer to:

- Tierbach (Ette), a river of Baden-Württemberg, Germany, headstream of the Ette
- Tierbach (Murr), a river of Baden-Württemberg, Germany, tributary of the Murr

== See also ==
- Thierbach, a river of Bavaria, Germany, tributary of the Main, and a German surname
