= Gratlspitze =

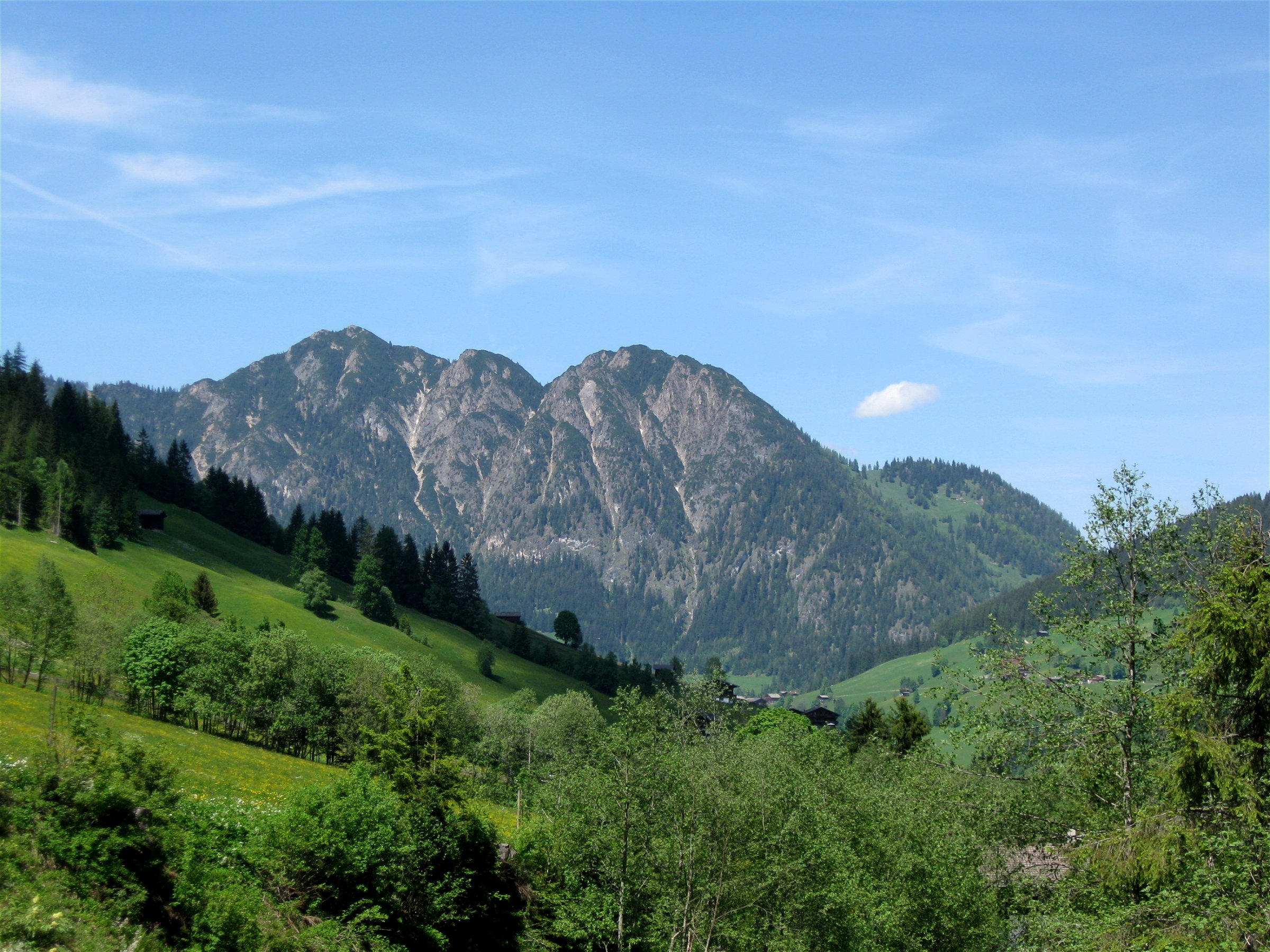
- The Gratlspitz from the Alpbach (southern) side

Highest point
- Elevation: 1,899 m (AA) (6,230 ft)
- Coordinates: 47°24′54″N 11°56′52″E

Geography
- Location within Austria
- Location: Tyrol, Austria
- Parent range: Kitzbühel Alps

The Gratlspitze or Gratlspitz, is a mountain in the Austrian state of Tyrol in the Kitzbühel Alps. It is linked to the Schatzberg to the north.

In addition to its 1,899 m (AA) high main summit it has two subpeaks, that give it a striking appearance. The mountain lies between the Alpine valleys of Wildschönau and the Alpbach.

There are long views from the summit as a result of its exposed situation as a relatively isolated mountain.

Silver mining was carried out on the mountain for many years. Several gallery entrances and heaps of waste rock are very still visible today (see photo below of the Wildschönauer side).

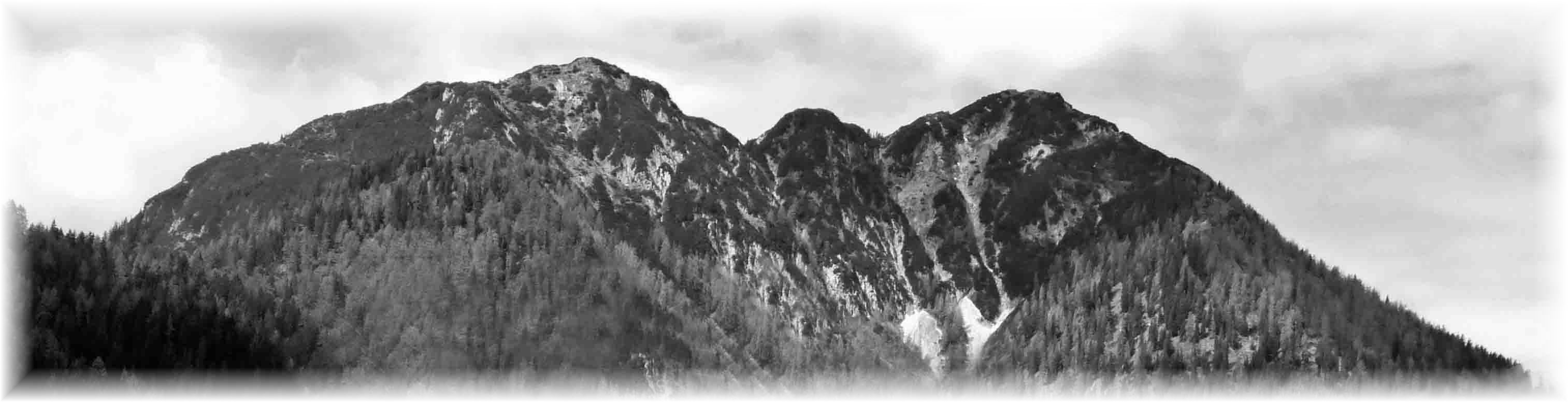
The Gratlspitz in summer 2010 seen from Thierbach, Wildschönau. The main summit is on the right.
