= Ellmau =

- Municipality
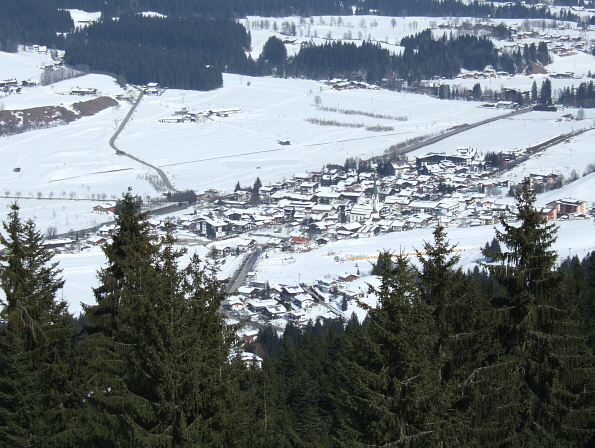
- Ellmau in winter

- Coat of arms

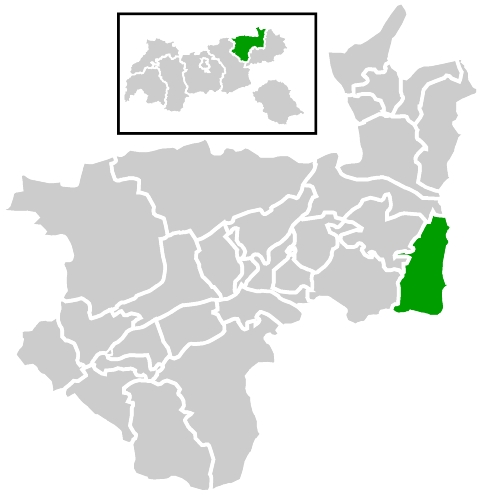
- Location within Kufstein district

- Location within Austria
- Coordinates: 47°30′50″N 12°18′13″E
- Country: Austria
- State: Tyrol
- District: Kufstein

Government
  - Mayor: Nikolaus Manzl

Area
  - Total: 36.39 km^{2} (14.05 sq mi)
- Elevation: 820 m (2,690 ft)

Population (2021)
  - Total: 2,866
  - Density: 78.76/km^{2} (204.0/sq mi)
- Time zone: UTC+1 (CET)
  - Summer (DST): UTC+2 (CEST)
- Postal code: 6352
- Area code: 05358
- Vehicle registration: KU
- Website: www.ellmau.tirol.gv.at

Ellmau is a municipality in the district of Kufstein in the Austrian region of Sölllandl. It lies 12 km southeast of Kufstein and 9 km west of Sankt Johann in Tirol. It is located at an elevation of 820 m above sea level. It was first mentioned in the records in 1155. Today it is part of the Ski Welt skiing area.

Ellmau is located in the alpine countryside, close to the Wilder Kaiser mountains and the steep forest and meadow hills to the south.

The village resort operates throughout the year. It provides a range of winter sports, while in the summer, activities such as hiking, mountain biking, and climbing are available.

== Lifts ==
The adjacent hills to the south of Ellmau have several lifts and a new (as of 2024) gondola ascending them (which replaced the funicular) . In winter several Drag Lifts are in operation for skiers going into the lower stage of hills, in addition to smaller nursery slope lifts. The main lifts are open in both summer and winter. The Astberg is located about 1.5 km east from the village, it is a 4-person chair lift going to the top of the Astberg, where there is a cafe. About 2 km to the west of the Village is the Hartkaiser heated gondola which ascends the Hartkaiser taking around 7 minutes. The funicular car has been placed at the top of the slopes as a monument to the former lift. At the top of the Hartkaiser is a restaurant and park with various interactive exhibits and wood carvings. About 4 km to the west at Scheffau is the Brandstadl Gondola Lifts, which are 4-man cars suspended by cable. There is also an 8-man gondola lift. 9 km away is the Hohe Salve lift which is also a gondola lift. The lift down to the other side of the Hohe Salve ends in Hopfgarten. Individual tickets for these lifts can be bought at the stations or weekly, fortnightly and season passes from tourist information; these cover most lifts in the Skiwelt area. There are no lifts going up the Wilder Kaiser side except for one located in Kufstein. Taxis are available up to the Wochenbrunn.

== Surrounding villages and places ==
In a clockwise direction from the northwest are the following places.

- Scheffau am Wilden Kaiser. This is a small village in the foothills of the Wilder Kaiser, it has a few guest houses a shop and cafe. It is also residential.
- Blaiken a small hamlet adjacent to Scheffau located next to the Bransdadl gondola lift.
- Auwald. A mostly residential hamlet.
- Sonnseit.
- Going. A moderate sized village with a church, various hotels and pensions, a few shops and restaurants. Going is located near the Asberg chair lift.
- Stanglwirt. A large hotel is located here.
- Prama. Mainly residential housing and farming.
- Sankt Johann in Tirol. This is a large town at the foot of the Kitzbuhel Horn. There is a large shopping area, with many gift shops and a retail park on outside of town. The town has a railway station and bus terminus. There is a hospital in the town. There is also a general aviation airfield. The town also has a brewery where Huber beer is made.
- Reith bei Kitzbühel. A small village to the south east of Ellmau. It is visible below from the Asberg.
- Kirchberg in Tirol. A moderately sized village with guesthouses, pensions, and houses.
- Brixen im Thale. A moderate sized village with pensions and a schnapps distillery.
- Westendorf. A small resort village in the Brixental valley.
- Hopfgarten im Brixental. Village located on the southern side of the Hohe Salve. Can be reached by chairlift from Söll.
- Söll. Resort village located to west of Ellmau. It has some shops, cafes, hotels and is located near the Hohe Salve gondola lift.

== Road links and transport ==
Ellmau is well served by roads, linked to the European road network. The village is located on the south side of the B178 road which bypasses the village, and travels east toward Sankt Johann in Tirol where it continues northeast to Lofer and Salzburg or joins the B170 south to Zell Am See and Carinthia. The B178 also runs west to Kufstein and Innsbruck. The nearest autobahn is at Kufstein and heads north to Germany and Munich and southwest to Innsbruck and Italy. The nearest main line railway stations are in Sankt Johann in Tirol, with services throughout Austria and beyond, and in Kufstein, with services to Germany and Italy. The nearest airports are Salzburg Airport and Innsbruck Airport which offer both scheduled and holiday charter flights around Europe and also inland flights. Munich Airport offers long haul flights to the United States of America and Asia, in addition to European flights.

Ellmau is connected by the local bus network with services to Kufstein and Sankt Johann in Tirol, the westbound bus to Kufstein goes via the village of Söll. In the summer and winter tourist seasons there are special buses running between Going, Stanglwirt, Scheffau am Wilden Kaiser, Blaiken and Söll (Hohe Salve), targeted at skiers and summer hikers.

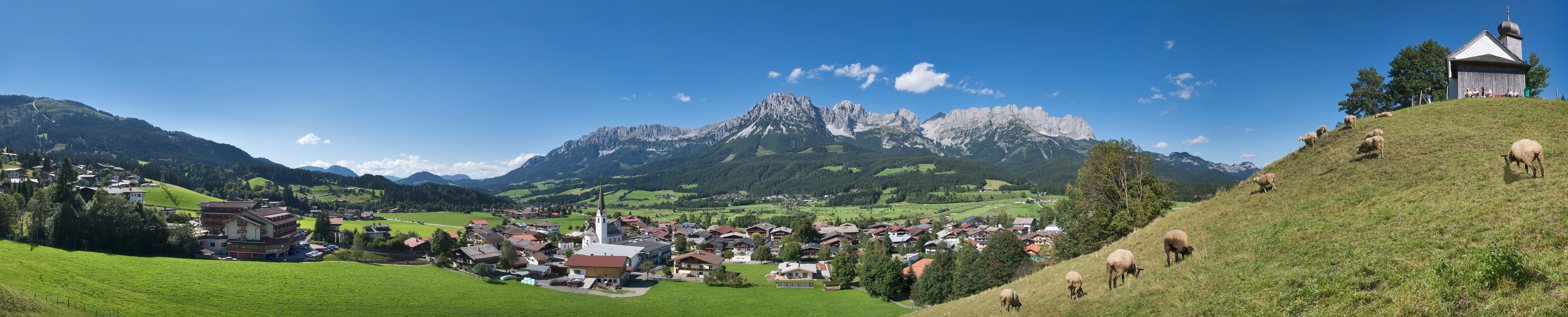
Panoramic view of Ellmau including the Visitation chapel to the right – a local landmark. The mountains behind the village belong to the Kaisergebirge range and are known as Wilder Kaiser (south face here).
