= Schatzberg =

Mountain in Tyrol, Austria

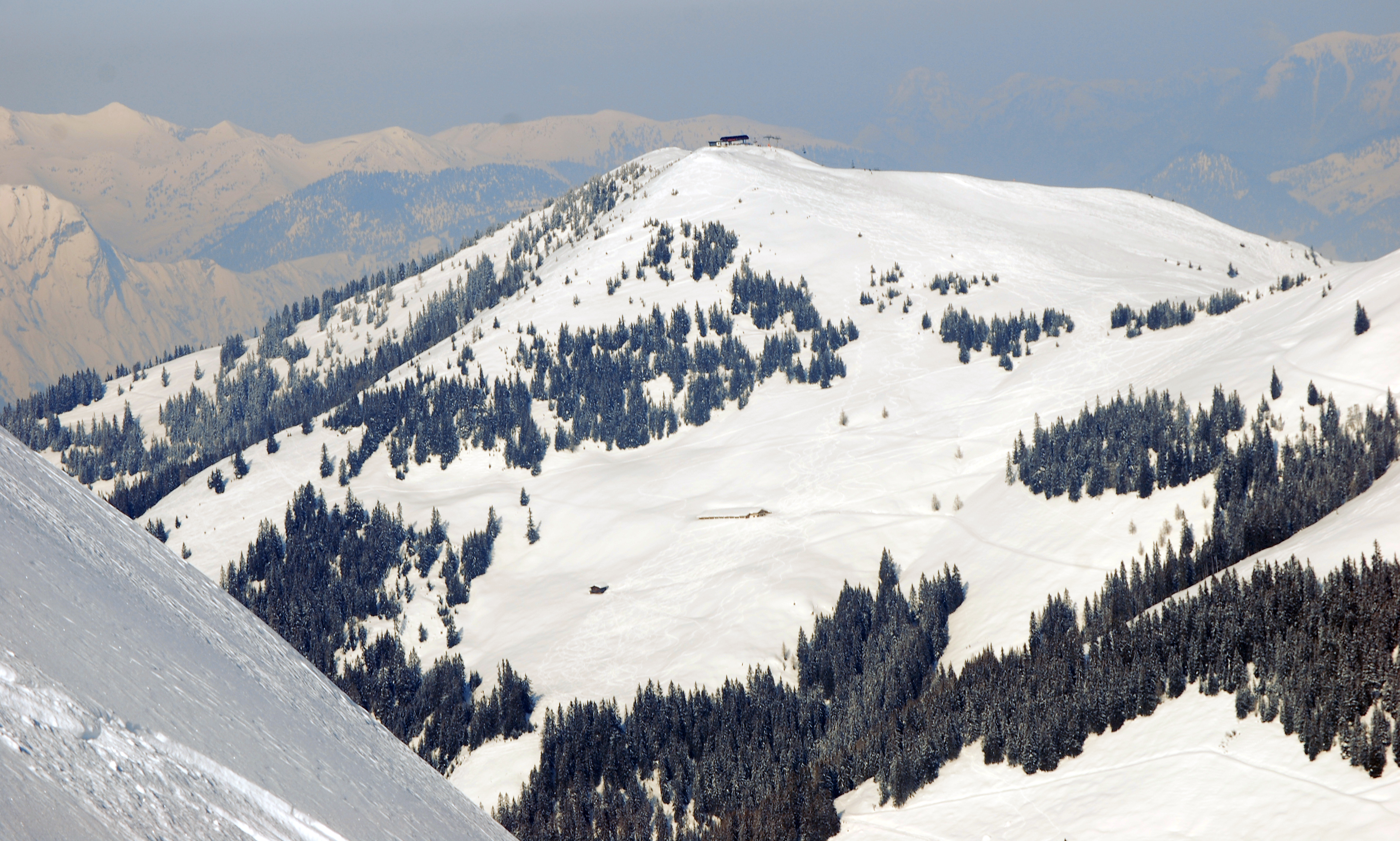
- Schatzberg from the south.

Highest point
- Elevation: 1898 m AA (6,227 ft)
- Coordinates: 47°23′25″N 11°59′04″E

Geography
- Location within Austria
- Location: Tyrol, Austria
- Parent range: Kitzbühel Alps

The Schatzberg is a 1,898-metre-high (6,227 ft) mountain in the Kitzbühel Alps in the Austrian state of Tyrol. It is also a winter sports area.

== Geography ==
The Schatzberg is part of a mountain ridge that separates the valley of the Alpbachtal in the west from the Wildschönau in the east. Its neighbouring peaks are the 1,964 m high Joelspitze to the south and the 1,899 m high Gratlspitze to the northwest. On its western side the Schatzberg is forested to just below the summit, on the eastern side the tree line is about 200 to 300 metres lower. There are many alpine pastures or alms on the Schatzberg. Nearby settlements are Alpbach to the northwest, Inneralpbach to the southwest and Auffach to the northeast.

== Development ==
The Schatzberg is accessible on all sides by marked hiking trails. Possible start points include Alpbach, Inneralpbach, Auffach, Thierbach or the Hösljoch (1,390 m).

One base for an ascent of the mountain is the mountain inn, Berggasthof Schatzbergalm, which lies northeast of the summit at a height of 1,776 m. It is accessible from Auffach on the Schatzberg Cableway (Schatzbergbahn) of the Wildschönau Mountain Cableways (Wildschönauer Bergbahnen). In winter the eastern flank of the Schatzberg is used as a ski area which has several chair lifts.

The path from Inneralpbach is a popular and relatively avalanche-safe ski tour.
