= Kitzbühel Alps =

Mountain range in Austria

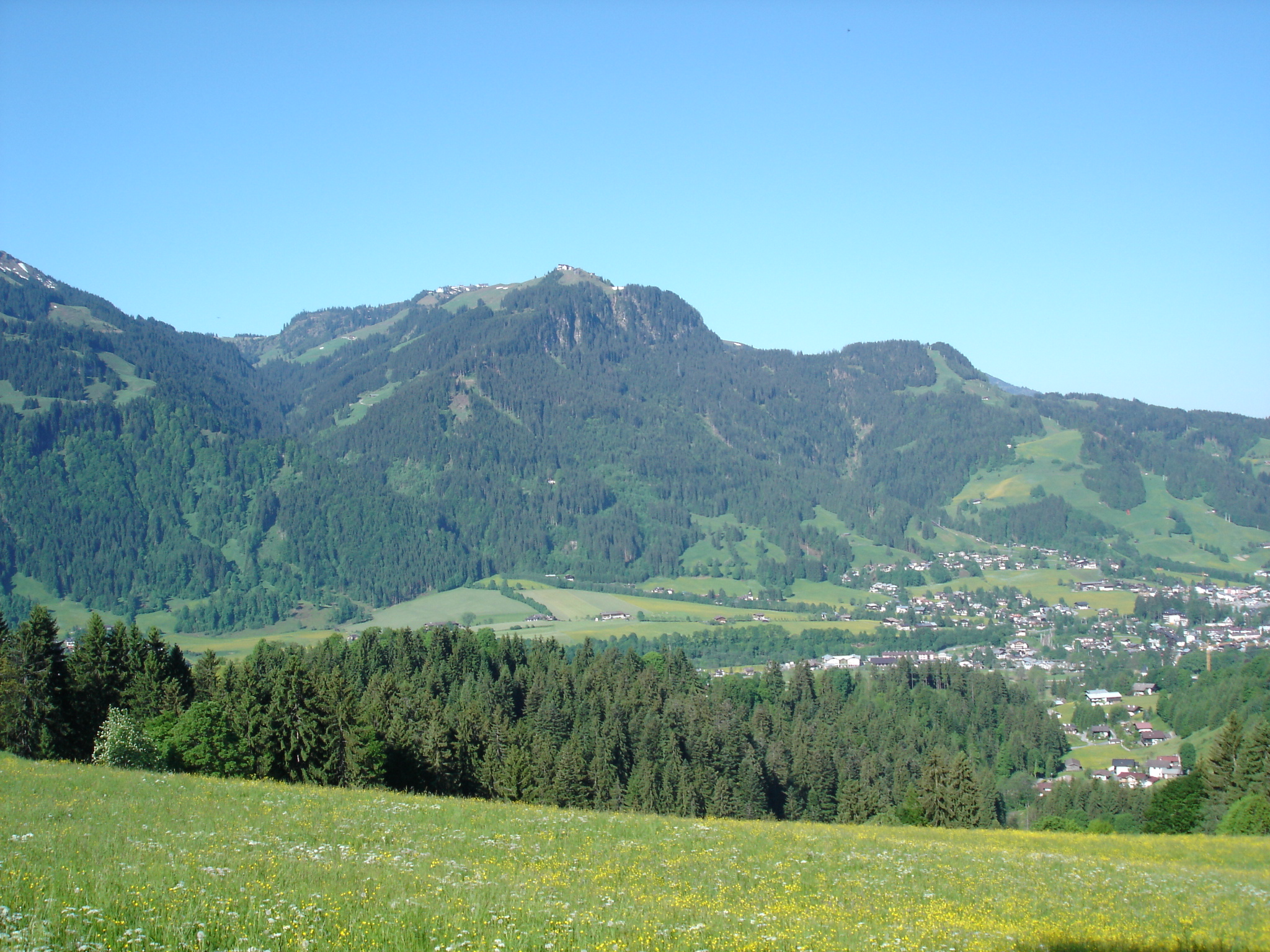
- Hahnenkamm (1,712m/5,616ft) above Kitzbühel

Highest point
- Peak: Kreuzjoch
- Elevation: 2,558 m (8,392 ft)
- Coordinates: 47°15′6″N 11°58′57″E

Geography
- Country: Austria
- States: Salzburg; Tyrol
- Range coordinates: 47°20′N 12°20′E
- Parent range: Central Eastern Alps

The Kitzbühel Alps (German: Kitzbüheler Alpen or Kitzbühler Alpen) are a mountain range of the Central Eastern Alps surrounding the town of Kitzbühel in Tyrol, Austria. Geologically they are part of the western slate zone (greywacke zone).

== Location ==
Two-thirds of the Kitzbühel Alps lie within the Austrian province of Tyrol, the remaining third is in Salzburg province. They are about 80 kilometres (50 mi) long from east to west and 25 to 35 km wide. They extend from the Ziller valley and Tux Alps in the west to the Saalach river and Zell am See on Lake Zell (Zellersee) in the east. They are bordered to the south by the Zillertal Alps and the High Tauern mountain range on the other side of the Salzach River, on the north by the Inn River and the Northern Limestone Alps.

The boundary of the region runs along the Salzach valley via Zell am See, where the Salzach swings north, to Saalfelden. Its northern boundary runs from east to west from the Saalfelden basin along the valley of the Leoganger Ache to the Grießen Pass and from there through the Pillersee valley, Leukental and Sölllandl to Wörgl and Kufstein. Its northwestern boundary is formed by the valley of the Inn between Wörgl and Jenbach.

The Kitzbühel Alps are divided by the Kitzbüheler Ache into the Glemmtal Alps in the east (Salzburg) and the Kelchsau Alps in the west. The highest summit in the Kitzbühel Alps is the Kreuzjoch in the southwest of the mountain range northwest of Gerlos at 2558 metres above sea level. The general height of the peaks descends gradually from around 2500 m in the west to around 2000 m in the east. Other important summits are the Western Salzachgeier (2,469 m), the Kröndlhorn (2,444 m), the Großer Rettenstein (2,366 m), the Geißstein (2,363 m), the Wildseeloder (2,118 m), the Großer Beil (2,309 m), the Großer Galtenberg (2,425 m), the Kitzbühler Horn (1,996 m), the Hohe Salve (1,828 m), the Hahnenkamm (1,712 m) and the Schmittenhöhe (1,965 m). Popular mountain destinations on the edge of the Inn valley are the Pölven (1,595 m) and the Gratlspitz (1,899 m).

The Kitzbühel Alps are found in the regions of St. Johann in Tirol, Kitzbühel and its environs, Pillerseetal, Brixental, Wildschönau and Alpbach.

The Kitzbühel Alps Tourist Region only covers part of the geographical Kitzbühel Alps.

The Kitzbühel Alps have relatively few rugged mountain tops and are well suited to walking and skiing. There are several large ski resorts in the area both in the Tyrolean and Salzburg regions. The Dienten Mountains are a geologically-related extension of the mountains to the east. The Pinzgau Ridgeway (Pinzgauer Höhenweg) runs through both ranges in an east-west direction. Many ski route and the Saalach Valley Ridgeway (Saalachtaler Höhenweg) run through the Kitzbühel Alps.

== Neighbouring ranges ==
The mountain ranges that surround the Kitzbühel Alps are:

- Kaiser Mountains
- Lofer Mountains
- Leogang Mountains
- Salzburg Slate Alps
- Glockner Group
- Granatspitze Group
- Venediger Group
- Zillertal Alps
- Tux Alps
- Brandenberg Alps

== Geology ==
The Kitzbühel Alps belong to the greywacke zone and are mainly composed of slate and phyllites. The mountain top profiles and the cirques are relatively smooth; their slopes mostly green with numerous alpine meadows (Almwiesen). Nevertheless, rock formations of limestone and dolomite do occur e.g. on the Großer Rettenstein.

In the western part of the Kitzbühel Alps most of the valleys run in a north-south direction; in the east they are predominantly oriented east-west. The Alpine geographical reason for this is the striking longitudinal trench of the river Salzach. This so-called Tauern Northern Edge Fault (Tauernnordrand-Störung) played an important role during Alpine folding and even today forms a distinct landscape and geological boundary with the three-thousanders of the High Tauern.

The western border of the mountain range is, petrographically, less clear because here its transition to the Innsbruck quartz phyllites is not clear-cut. By contrast, in the northwest and north (Inn valley near Schwaz, Brixental and the Steinernes Meer) the difference between the gently folded slate and the limestone and dolomite rock of the Limestone Alps hits the observer in the eye.

The major rocks of the Kitzbühel Alps divide into two groups by age, the older rocks probably dating to the Ordovician period. For example, the deep underground complex of Wildschönau slate is quite uniform and has no fossils at all, just volcanic deposits. Above it lies weakly metamorphosed volcanic rock, up to 600 metres thick, made up of quartz porphyroids and tuff, mainly in the west (Hohe Salve, Hahnenkamm and Wildseeloder).

Over the porphyroids lie various horizontal beds of slate from the Silurian period that are often clayey-sandy on top. In the vicinity of Kitzbühel itself, Silurian limestones may also be found and, to the west, the grey, coarse-grained Schwaz dolomite which transitions towards the east, near Leogang, into Spielberg dolomite. Also represented is the post-Variscan period, with its Rotliegendes (red slates), and thick sandstones from the Permoskyth. All these successive layers of the greywacke zone were probably - together with those of the Northern Limestone Alps - overturned to the northern edge of the Alps during the time of Alpine orogeny from a region of deposition far to the south.

== Sports ==
Their mainly gently rolling nature makes the Kitzbühel Alps suitable for alpine farming, hiking and skiing.

== Tourism ==
The Kitzbühel Alps is a popular tourist destination. Alongside managed Alpine pastures and inns, there is also a large number of mountain huts belonging to the various Alpine clubs.

- Alpenrose Hut
- Neue Bamberger Hut
- Bochumer Hut
- Brechhornhaus (private)
- Bürgl Hut (private)
- Erich Sulke Hut
- Erla Hut (private)
- Fritz Hintermayr Hut (private)
- Hochhörndler Hut (private)
- Hochwildalm Hut
- Kobinger Hut (private)
- Oberland Hut
- Pinzgau Hut (Friends of Nature)
- Steinberghaus Inn (Gasthaus Steinberghaus)
- Wildkogelhaus (private)
- Wildseeloderhaus
- Wolkensteinhaus

== Highest peaks ==
Their highest peaks are concentrated to the south-western corner and reach rather modest 2,500 m, the highest being the Kreuzjoch at 2,558 metres above sea level. Roughly in the centre of the range lies the famous ski resort of Kitzbühel, the venue of the Hahnenkamm race, one of the most spectacular and well-known ski races in the world.

The highest summits in the range are (in order of height above the Adriatic):

- Kreuzjoch, 2,558 m.
- Torhelm, 2,494 m.
- Salzachgeier, 2,469 m.
- Aleitenspitze, 2,449 m.
- Schafsiedel, 2,447 m.
- Kröndlhorn, 2,444 m.
- Großer Galtenberg, 2,424 m.
- Geißstein, 2,366 m.
- Großer Rettenstein, 2,362 m.
- Großer Beil, 2,309 m.
- Sonnenjoch, 2,287 m.
- Wildkogel, 2,224 m.
- Kleiner Rettenstein, 2,216 m.
- Steinbergstein, 2,215 m.
- Gamshag, 2,178 m.
- Wiedersberger Horn, 2,127 m.
- Wildseeloder, 2,119 m.
- Schattberg, 2,097 m.
- Brechhorn, 2,032 m.
- Kitzbühler Horn, 1,996 m.
- Schmittenhöhe, 1,965 m.
- Wildkarspitze 1,961 m.
- Gratlspitze, 1,899 m.
- Schatzberg 1,898 m.
- Hohe Salve, 1,828 m.
- Roßkopf, 1,731 m
- Hahnenkamm, 1,712 m.
- Pölven, 1,595 m.

== Gallery ==
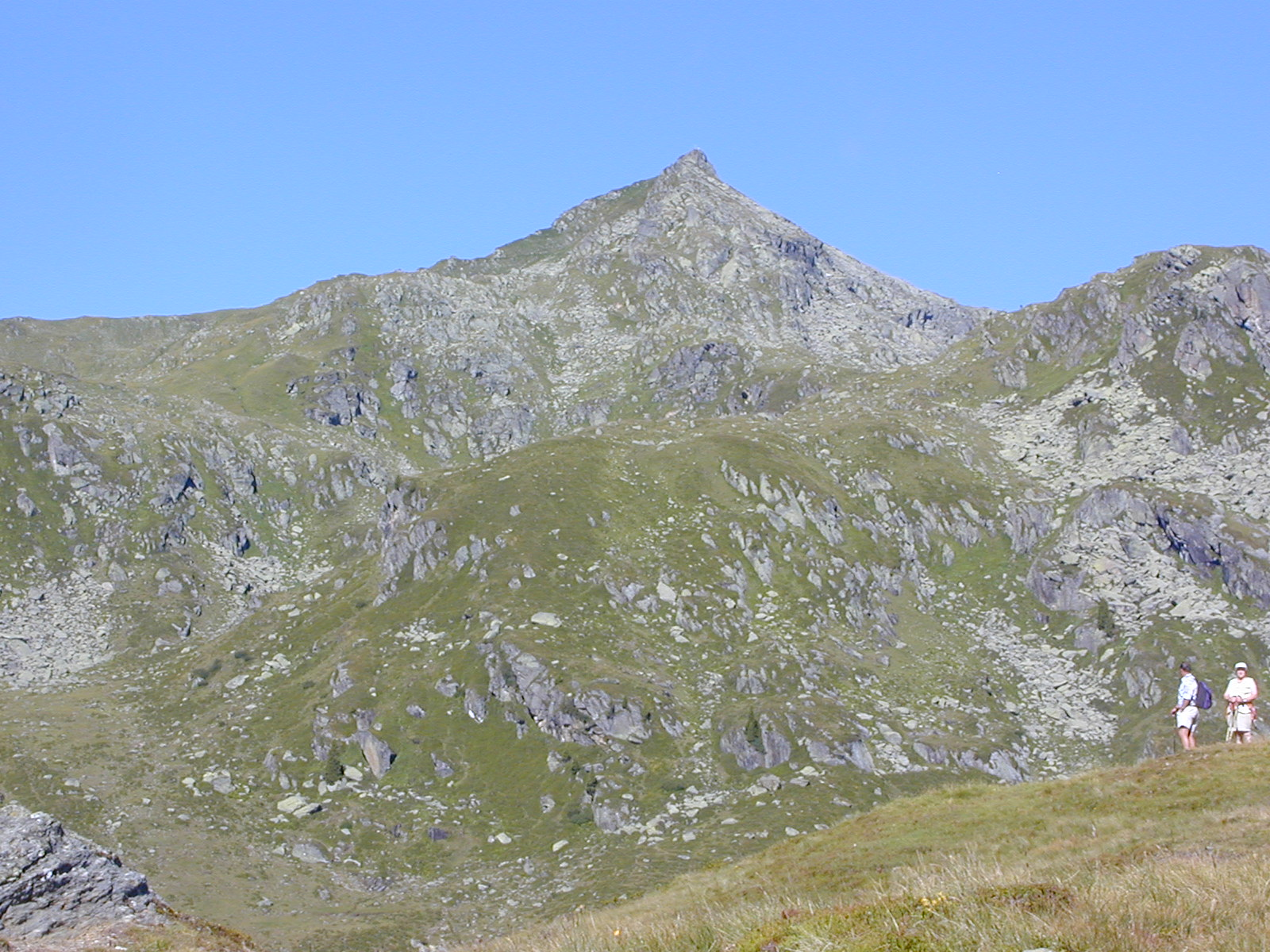
The Salzachgeier, 2,469 m (8,100 ft 5 in)

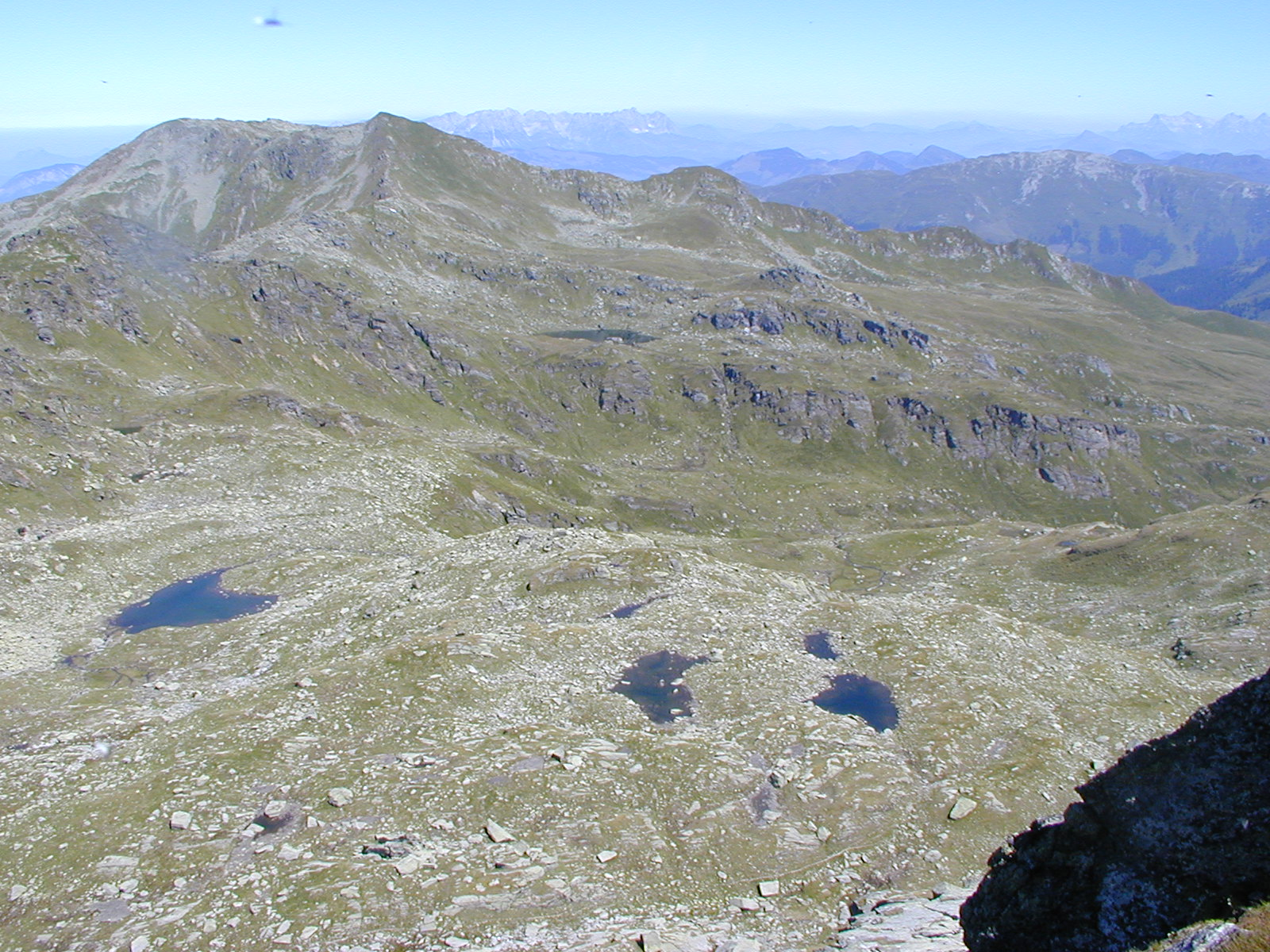
View from the Salzachgeier over the Kelchsau Alps

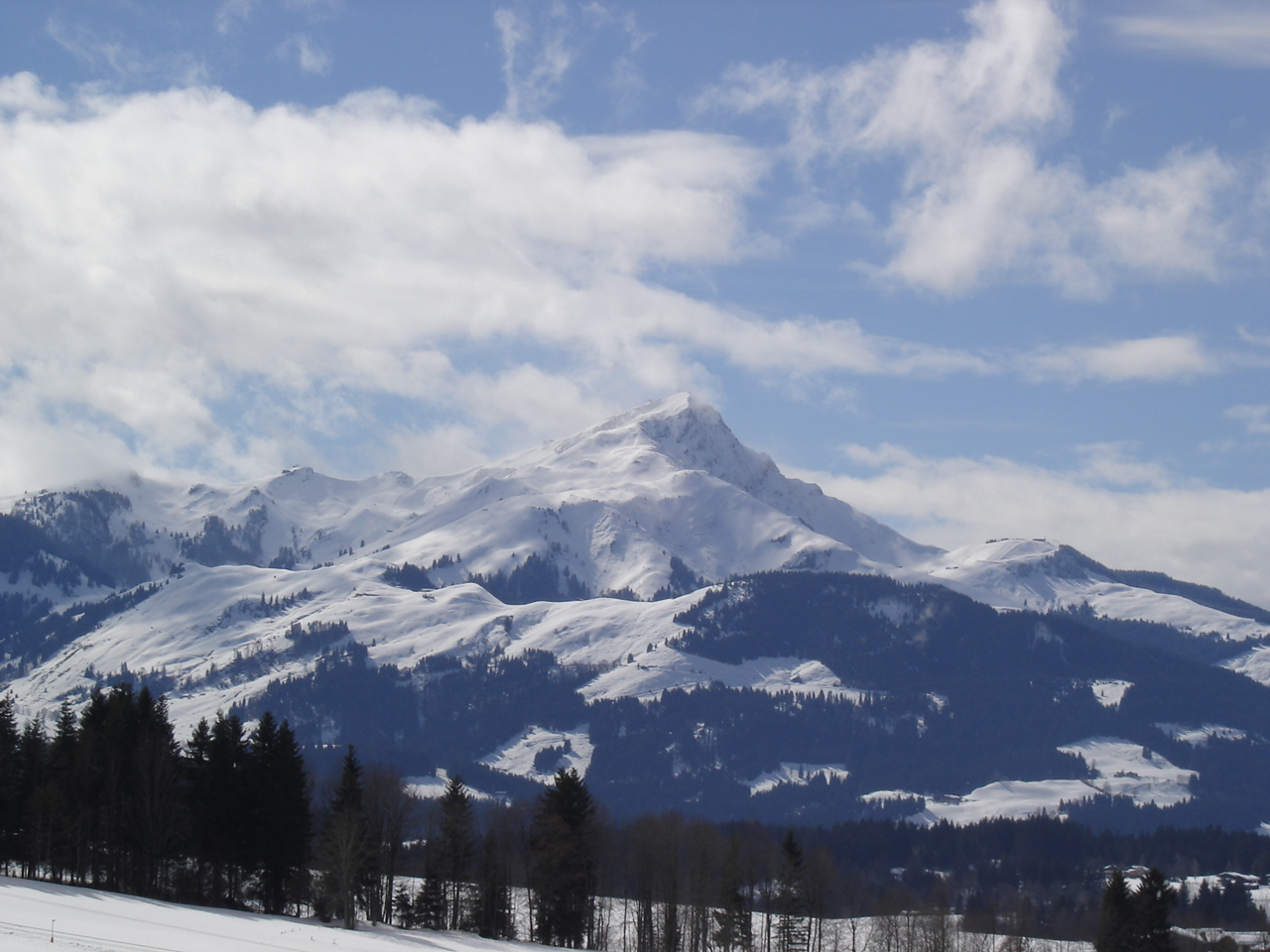
The Kitzbüheler Horn

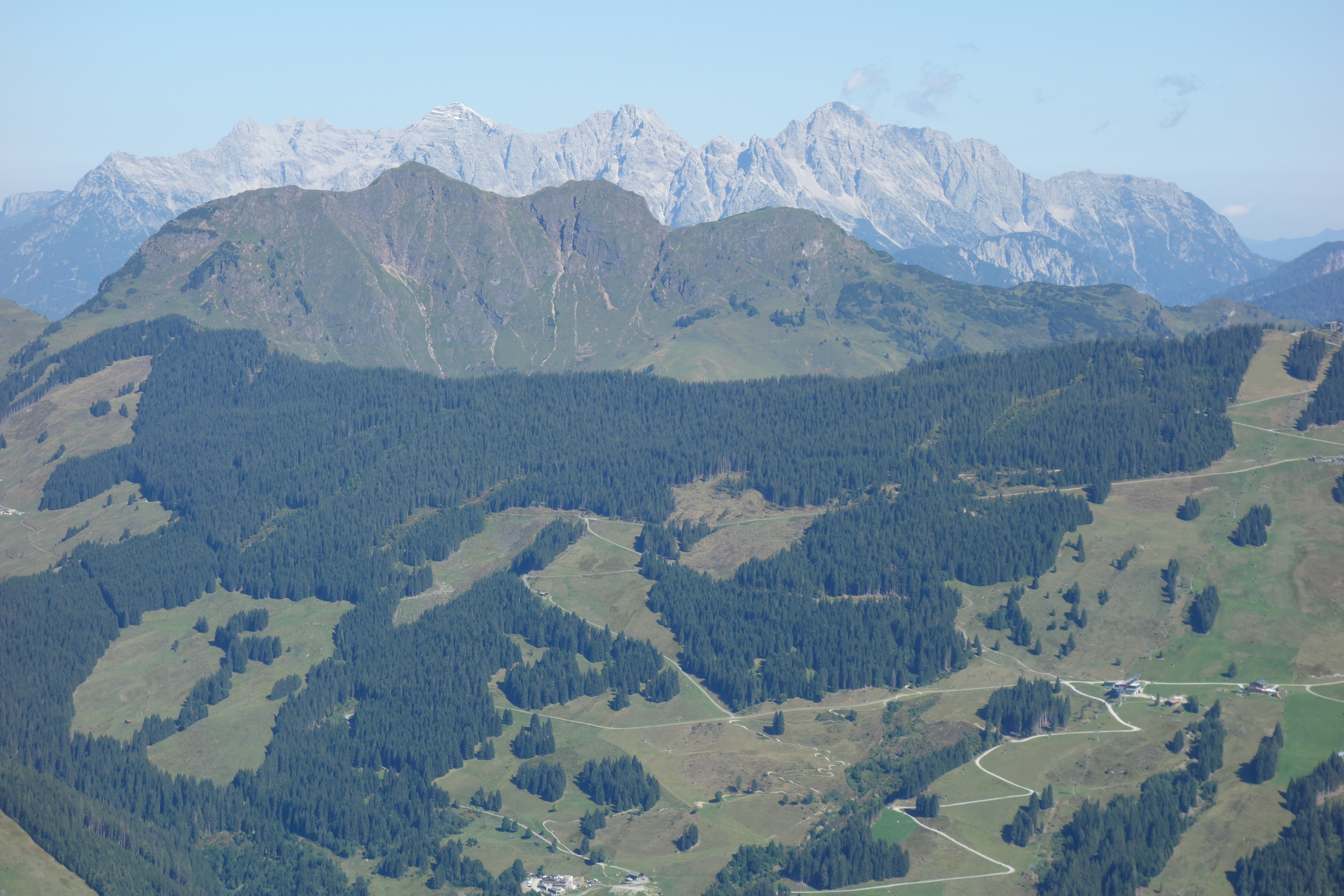
The Spielberghorn from the south

== See also ==
- Alps
- Bavaria
- Berchtesgaden
- Kitzbühel
- Salzburg
- Salzburg (state)

== Sources ==
- Freytag-Berndt Kitzbüheler Alpen und Pinzgau. Hiking map 1:100.000 (Sheet 38) and hut guide, Geografa Vienna-Innsbruck-Munich-Bozen.
- R.Oberhauser (Hsg.): Der geologische Aufbau Österreichs, Chapters 3.6.5, 3.6.6 und 3.13. Geologische Bundesanstalt Vienna / Springer-Verlag Vienna/ New York 1980
