= Pölven =

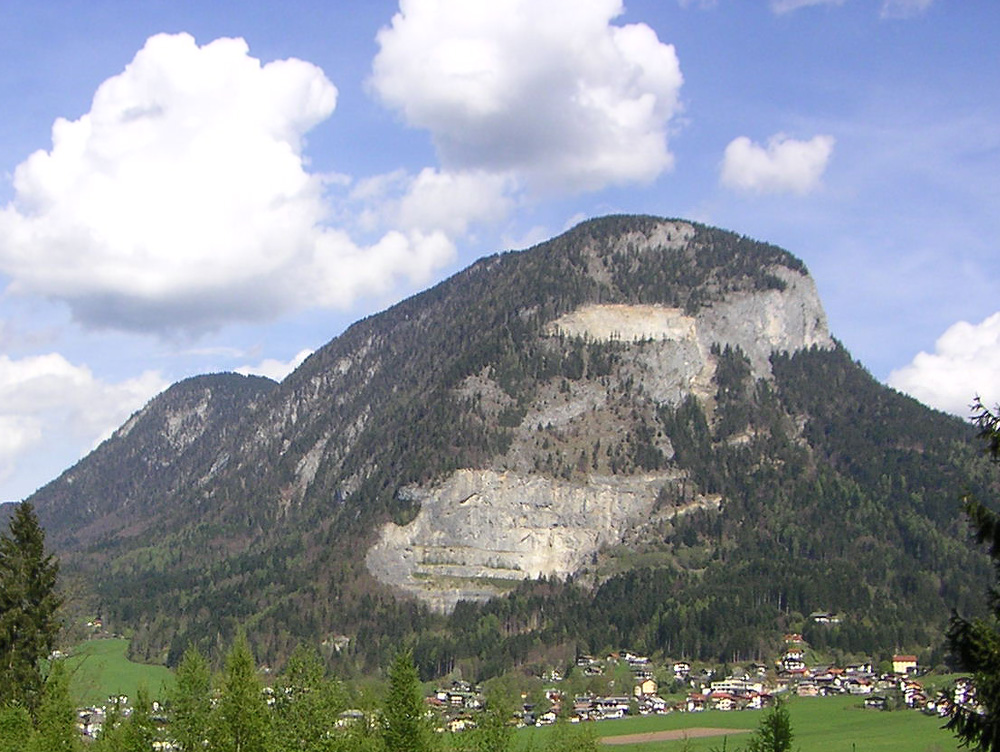
- The Großer and Kleiner Pölven, seen from Bad Häring

Highest point
- Elevation: 1,595 m (AA) (5,233 ft)
- Coordinates: 47°30′39″N 12°09′05″E

Geography
- Location within Austria
- Location: Tyrol, Austria
- Parent range: Kitzbühel Alps

The Pölven is a mountain in the Kitzbühel Alps in the Lower Inn Valley in the Austrian state of Tyrol. In the Kitzbühel Alps, it is the smallest mountain in elevation.

The mountain consists of a ridge with two peaks: the Großer ("Great") and Kleiner ("Small") Pölven, the Großer Pölven (also called the Mittagskogel) reaches a height of 1,595 m (AA). The summit can be scaled over a small and simple Klettersteig. From the summit area, there are views of Hohe Salve, Bad Häring, the Lower Inn Valley, the Wilder Kaiser, the Loferer Steinberge, and Söll. The ridge is one of the less well-known mountains and hence less frequented by tourists. Occasional aircraft noise interrupts the quiet atmosphere because this region is well suited to gliders due to the good thermals.

The Pölven has quarries that extract marl and limestone and are used by the cement industry in Kirchbichl.

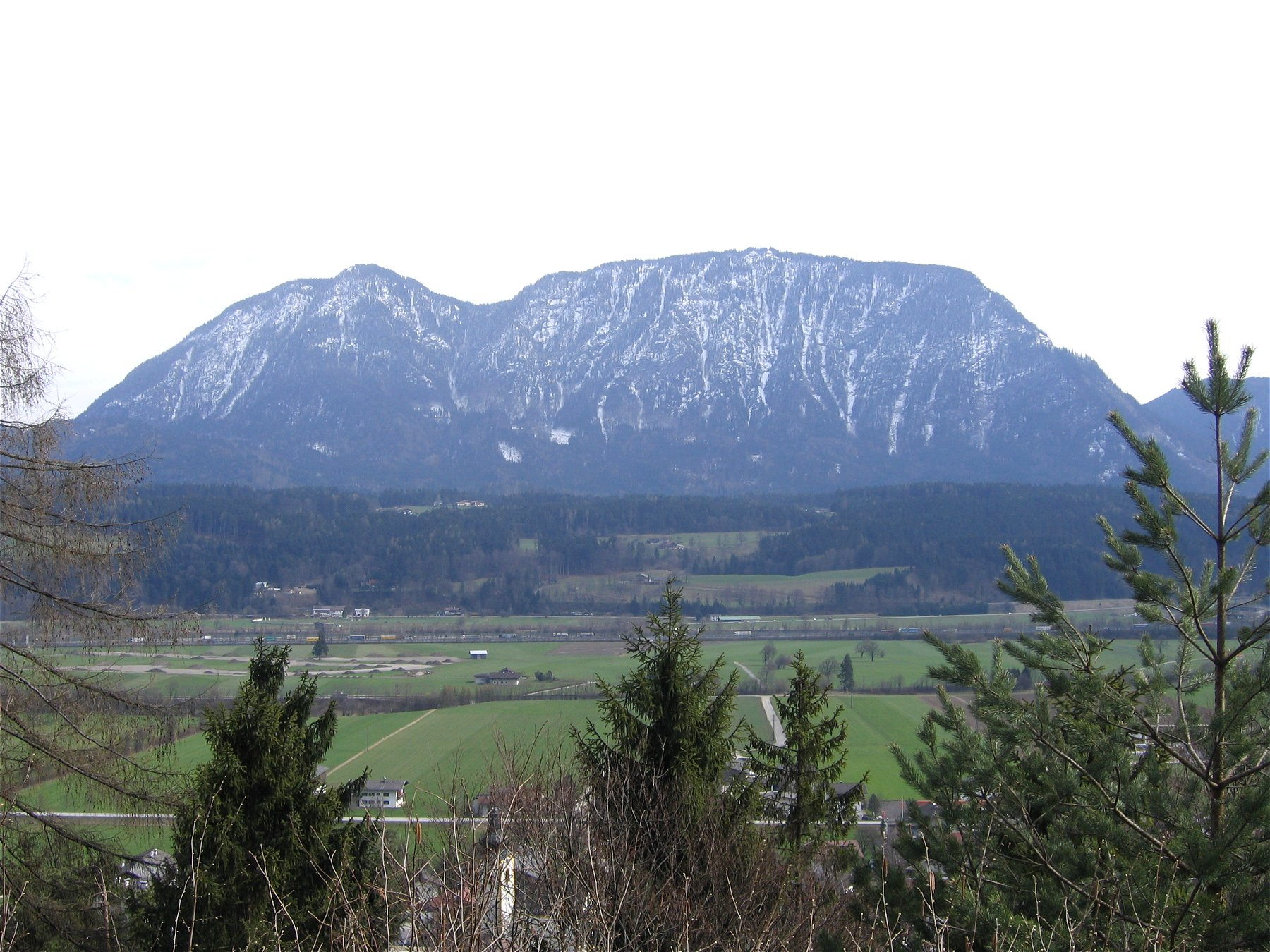
The picture is seen from Langkampfen. The left shows the Kleine Pölven and the right has Große Pölven.

== See also ==
- Kaiser mountains
- Großer Rettenstein
- Geißstein
- Alps
- List of highest mountains in Austria
