= Gamshag =

Mountain

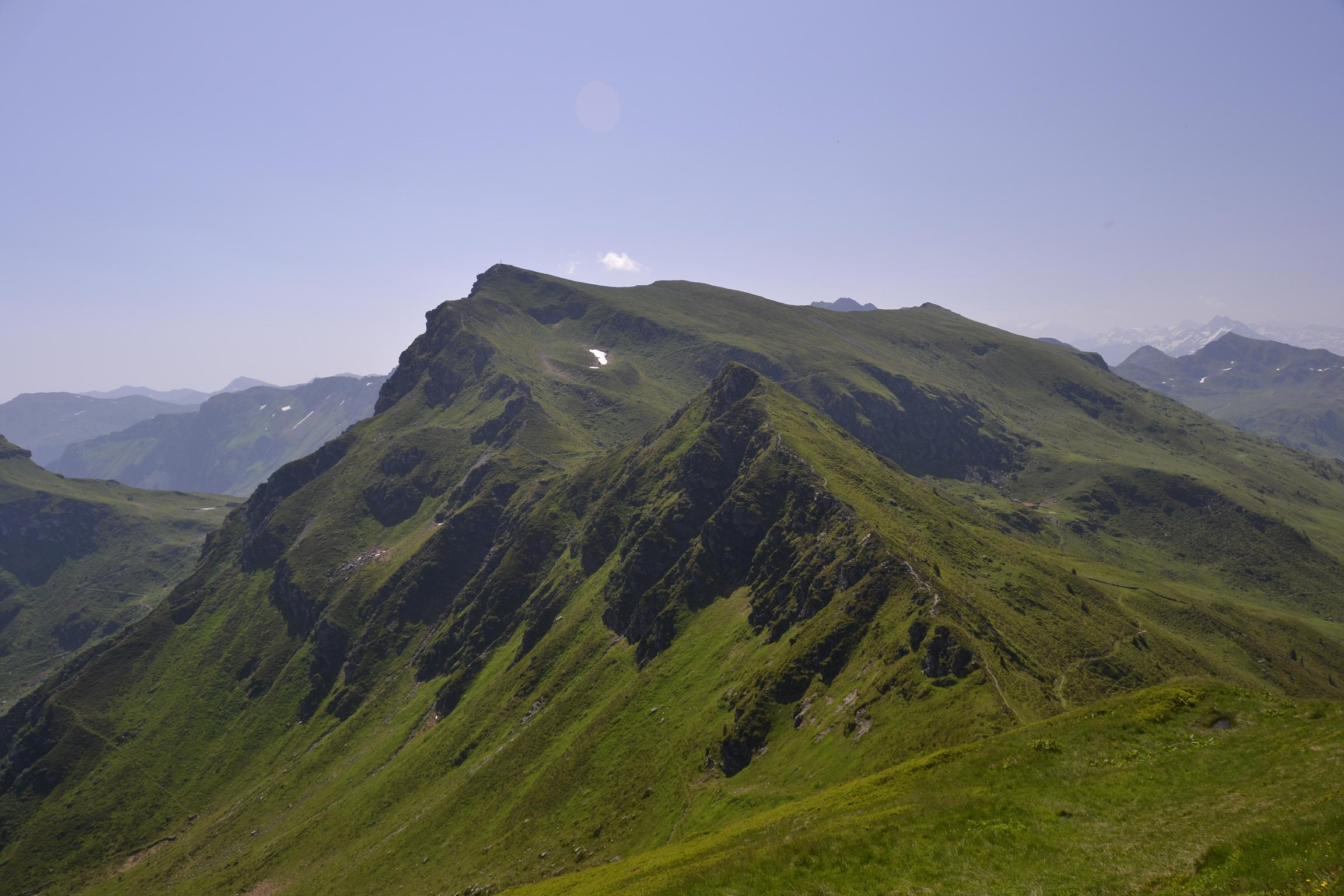
- Gamshag

Highest point
- Elevation: 2,178 m (AA) (7,146 ft)
- Coordinates: 47°21′52″N 12°28′03″E

Geography
- Location within Austria
- Location: Tyrol
- Parent range: Kitzbühel Alps

The Gamshag is a mountain in the Kitzbühel Alps in the Austrian state of Tyrol whose summit reaches a height of 2,178 m (AA).

The Gamshag is located northwest of the Torsee lake, the source of the River Saalach. The prominent peak of the Tristkogel (2,095 m (AA)) rises to the northeast. To the northwest are the Kleine Schütz (2,079 m (AA)) and the Schützkogel (2,069 m (AA)); to the south is the 2,174 m high Teufelssprung ("Devil's Leap").

The Gamshag is easily accessed over well-signposted hiking trails both from the west from Jochberg as well as from the Saalach valley to the east. In winter the mountain can also be climbed as part of a ski tour.
