= Großer Beil =

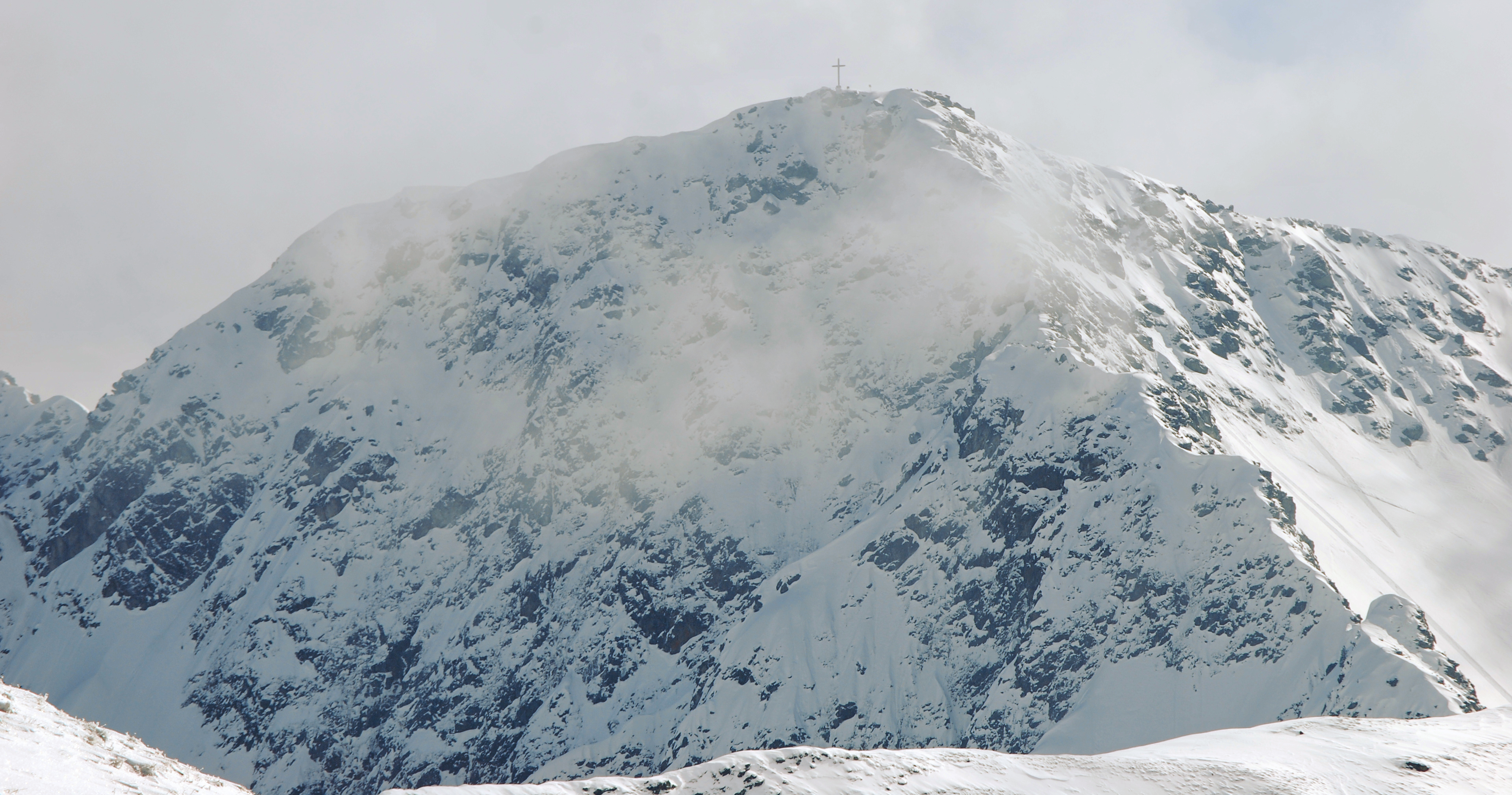
- The Großer Beil seen from the Lämpersberg

Highest point
- Elevation: 2,309 m (AA) (7,575 ft)
- Coordinates: 47°20′29″N 12°01′36″E

Geography
- Location within Austria
- Location: Tyrol, Austria
- Parent range: Kitzbühel Alps

The Großer Beil, is a 2,309 m (AA) high mountain at the head of the Wildschönau valley in the Austrian state of Tyrol. It belongs to the Kitzbühel Alps and is the highest summit on the ridge that separates the Wildschönau from the neighbouring valley of the Alpbach to the west. Around 500 metres north is the 2,189 m high Seekopf and a further 500 metres beyond that is the Kleine Beil at 2,197 m. The next mountain to the south is the 2,216 m high Gressenstein. On the other side of the valley is the Wildkarspitze (1,961 m).

The Großer Beil is a popular hiking mountain and may be reached on marked trails from the north or south. The usual start point is the Schönangeralm (1,173 m) at the head of the Wildschönau valley behind Auffach. In winter the Großer Beil is a popular ski tour.

The name of the mountain is not derived from the German word Beil (="hatchet") but from a dialect word for a place near which animals are held during a hunt.
