= Wildkarspitze (Kitzbühel Alps) =

- Location within Austria

Highest point
- Elevation: 1,961 m (AA) (6,434 ft)
- Coordinates: 47°21′37″N 12°04′42″E

Geography
- Location: Tyrol, Austria
- Parent range: Kitzbühel Alps

The Wildkarspitze is a mountain in the Austrian state of Tyrol in the Kitzbühel Alps. It is 1,961 metres (6,434 ft) high and lies on a crest running SSW-NNE between the valleys of the Wildschönauer Ache to the west and Kelchsauer Ache to the east, about 12 kilometres due south of Wörgl. Along the ridge to the north is the Breitteggern (1,981 m) and to the south the Breiteggspitze (1,868 m), also known as the Kleinberger Niederhorn.

The mountain may be ascended on an easy walk from the Schönangeralm at 1,173 m which is accessible by road. From the alm the path runs through the Breiteggalm and Kleinneubergalm to the summit of the Kleinberger Niederhorn. From there is it is about ½ hr to the Wildkarspitze. About 2½ hours should be allowed for the ascent. The descent may be made on the same route or via the slightly higher Breiteggern back to the Breiteggalm and down to the start. During the ascent, there are good views of the mountains to the west on the far side of the Wildschönauer Ache valley, especially the Lämpersberg and the Großer Beil.
