= Pillersee =

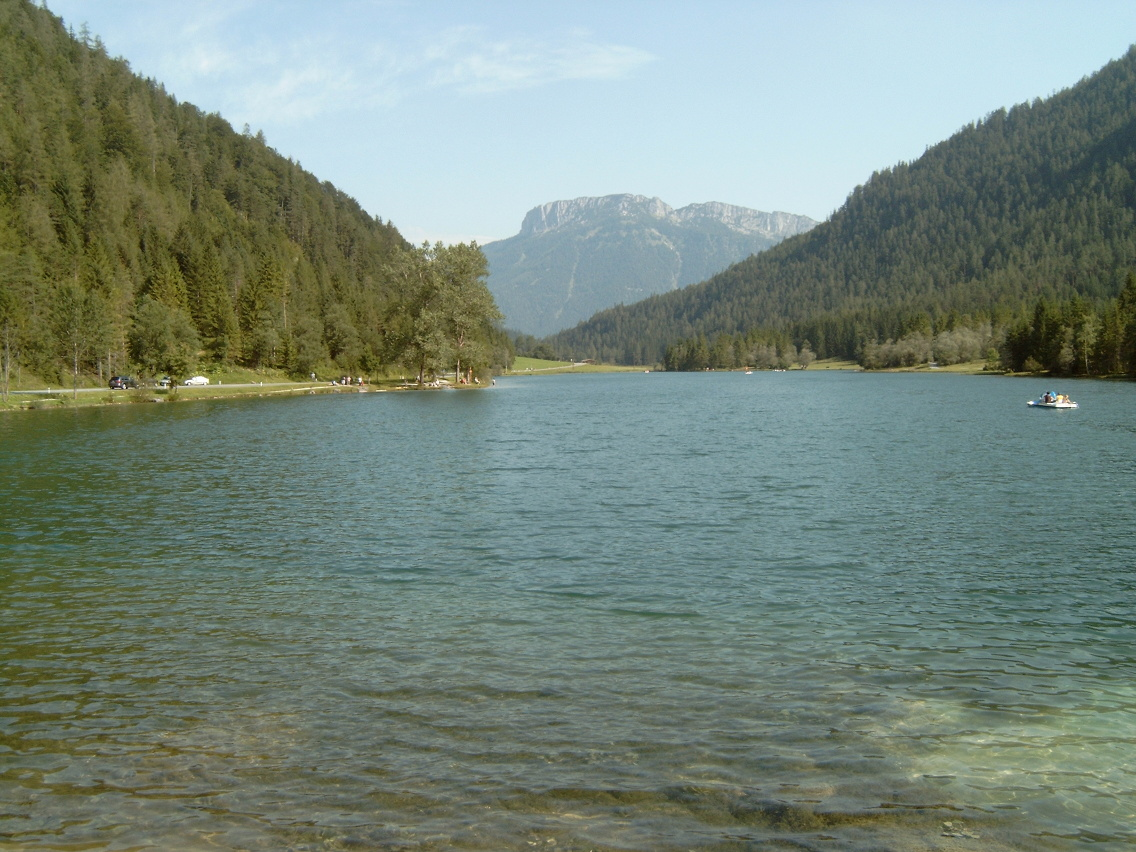
- The Pillersee

- Location within Austria
- Location: Northern Limestone Alps, Tyrol, Austria
- Coordinates: 47°32′19″N 12°34′07″E
- Type: lake
- Surface area: 24.3 hectares (60 acres)
- Max. depth: 7 metres (23 ft)

Pillersee is a lake in the Northern Limestone Alps in Tyrol, Austria.

The Pillersee is in the Pillerseevalley near the village of Sankt Ulrich am Pillersee at 835 m above sea level. It occupies an area of 24.3 hectares (60 acres). Inflows are several streams that originate in the adjacent Lofer Steinberg mountains and the Kitzbühel Alps. The outlet of the lake is made by the Haselbach and Grieselbach, the depth of the lake is at its lowest point 7 metres (23 ft). It is surrounded with mountains and can be swam in.

The origin to the Pillersee is a landslide about 15,000 years ago, which interrupted the outflow of Öfenschlucht canyon and so dammed the Pillersee.
