= Sankt Jakob in Haus =

St. Jakob in Haus
- Municipality
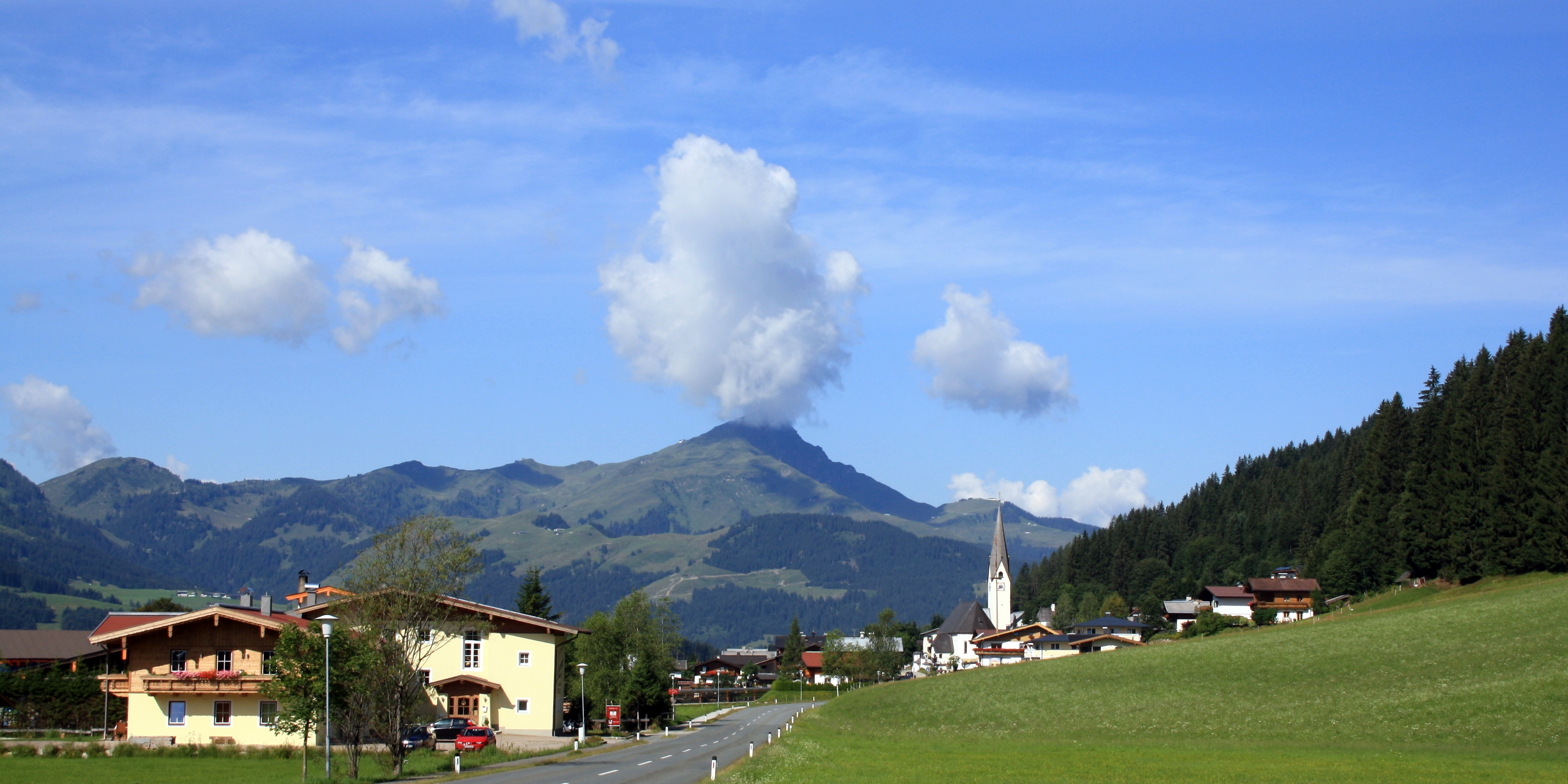
- View of Sankt Jakob in Haus

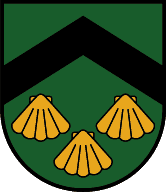
- Coat of arms

- Location within Austria
- Coordinates: 47°30′03″N 12°33′35″E
- Country: Austria
- State: Tyrol
- District: Kitzbühel

Government
  - Mayor: Leonhard Niedermoser

Area
  - Total: 9.61 km^{2} (3.71 sq mi)
- Elevation: 856 m (2,808 ft)

Population (2020)
  - Total: 795
  - Density: 82.7/km^{2} (214/sq mi)
- Time zone: UTC+1 (CET)
  - Summer (DST): UTC+2 (CEST)
- Postal code: 6391
- Area code: 05354
- Vehicle registration: KB
- Website: www.riskommunal.net/ stjakob

Sankt Jakob in Haus is a municipality in the Kitzbühel district in the Austrian state of Tyrol located 13.60 km (8.45 mi) northeast of Kitzbühel as well as 2.50 km (1.55 mi) above Fieberbrunn. It is the smallest community in the district. The village was mentioned in documents for the first time in 1308 but settlement already began in the 10th century. The main source of income is tourism.

== Population ==
Historical population
Year	Pop.	±%
1869	263	—
1880	254	−3.4%
1890	241	−5.1%
1900	280	+16.2%
1910	283	+1.1%
1923	288	+1.8%
1934	286	−0.7%
1939	273	−4.5%
1951	364	+33.3%
1961	387	+6.3%
1971	453	+17.1%
1981	493	+8.8%
1991	578	+17.2%
2001	635	+9.9%
2011	730	+15.0%
