= Thierbach =

River in Germany

Location
- Country: Germany
- State: Bavaria

Physical characteristics
- Mouth
  - location: Main
  - coordinates: 49.6706°N 10.0491°E
- Length: 20.1 km (12.5 mi)

Basin features
- Progression: Main→ Rhine→ North Sea

Thierbach is a river of Bavaria, Germany. It flows into the Main near Ochsenfurt.

== See also ==
- List of rivers of Bavaria
