= Söll =

- Municipality
- Coat of arms

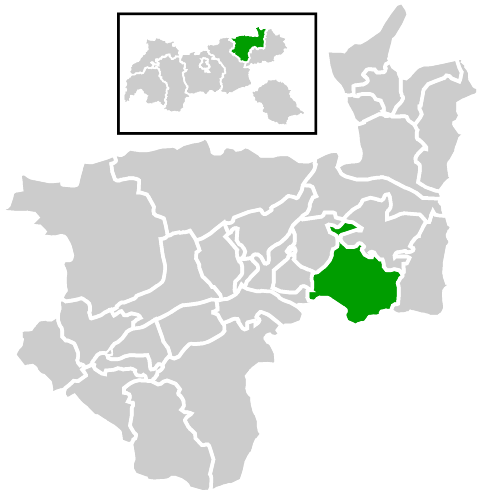
- Location within Kufstein district

- Location within Austria
- Coordinates: 47°30′13″N 12°11′31″E
- Country: Austria
- State: Tyrol
- District: Kufstein

Government
  - Mayor: Hans Eisenmann (ÖVP)

Area
  - Total: 45.97 km^{2} (17.75 sq mi)
- Elevation: 703 m (2,306 ft)

Population (2021)
  - Total: 3,722
  - Density: 80.97/km^{2} (209.7/sq mi)
- Time zone: UTC+1 (CET)
  - Summer (DST): UTC+2 (CEST)
- Postal code: 6306
- Area code: 05333
- Vehicle registration: KU
- Website: www.soell.tirol.gv.at

Söll is a municipality in the district of Kufstein in the Austrian region of Sölllandl. It is located 9 km south of Kufstein and 9 km east of Wörgl. The village consists of 25 subdivisions. The main sources of income are agriculture and tourism.

== Tourist attractions ==
Söll is one of the principal ski-holiday villages of the region Ski Welt Wilder Kaiser. It is located beneath the conical Hohe Salve peak, the highest point in the ski area. The Hohe Salve also offers black and red classified ski runs as well as ski routes from the top lift station. The Hohe Salve has a church located on its peak as well as a mountain restaurant that features a revolving terrace, offering a panoramic view of the region. Other ski holiday resorts in the Ski Welt Wilder Kaiser region are Itter, Scheffau, Ellmau, Going, Brixen and Hopfgarten. A new lift is scheduled to open for the 2008/09 ski season that will link Brixen to Westendorf and furthermore to Kitzbühel, thus creating one of the biggest ski regions in the world. After dark Söll offers apres-ski with slope-side bars offering dancing and drinking until late in the night. In some cases, ski buses are necessary to reach the ski lifts from the accommodation.

== Sights ==
There are several sights in Söll:

- The parish church Saint Peter and Paul was built 1764–1768 in a Baroque style. It is in the old village center.
- Typical traditional Tyrolean architecture can be seen in Main Street. Some houses have sightworthy wall paintings, e.g. the old inn Postwirt.
- Pilgrimage church Das Wallfahrtskirchlein am Stampfanger.
- War memorial (German: Kriegerdenkmal) referring to a battle of the Napoleonic wars on 13 May 1809 which took place near Soell. The memorial is at the end of walking track in the north of the village.

== Ski area ==
Soll is part of the "Ski Welt" area, the largest interconnected ski area in the whole of Austria, and it boasts around 250 km of downhill ski trails. It is now possible to connect to the resort of Kitzbuehel from Westendorf (ski welt) thanks to a new gondola that has been constructed, although it is only possible to ski this area with the "Kitzbuehler Alpen" ski pass. For any more information on both the "Ski Welt" area and ski pass or the areas covered by the "Kitzbuehler Alpen" ski pass, use the following links: "Ski Welt" Wilder Kaiser Official Website "Kitzbuehler Alpen" Official website

== Traffic connections ==
Söll is easily accessible from Kufstein railway station by bus. There are also buses to Wörgl and St. Johann in Tirol.

== Panorama ==
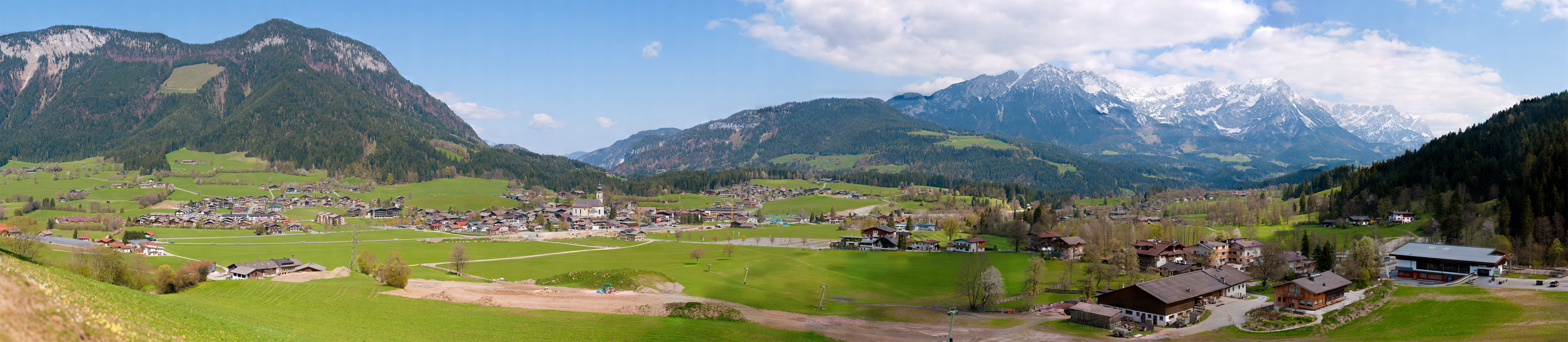

== Gallery ==
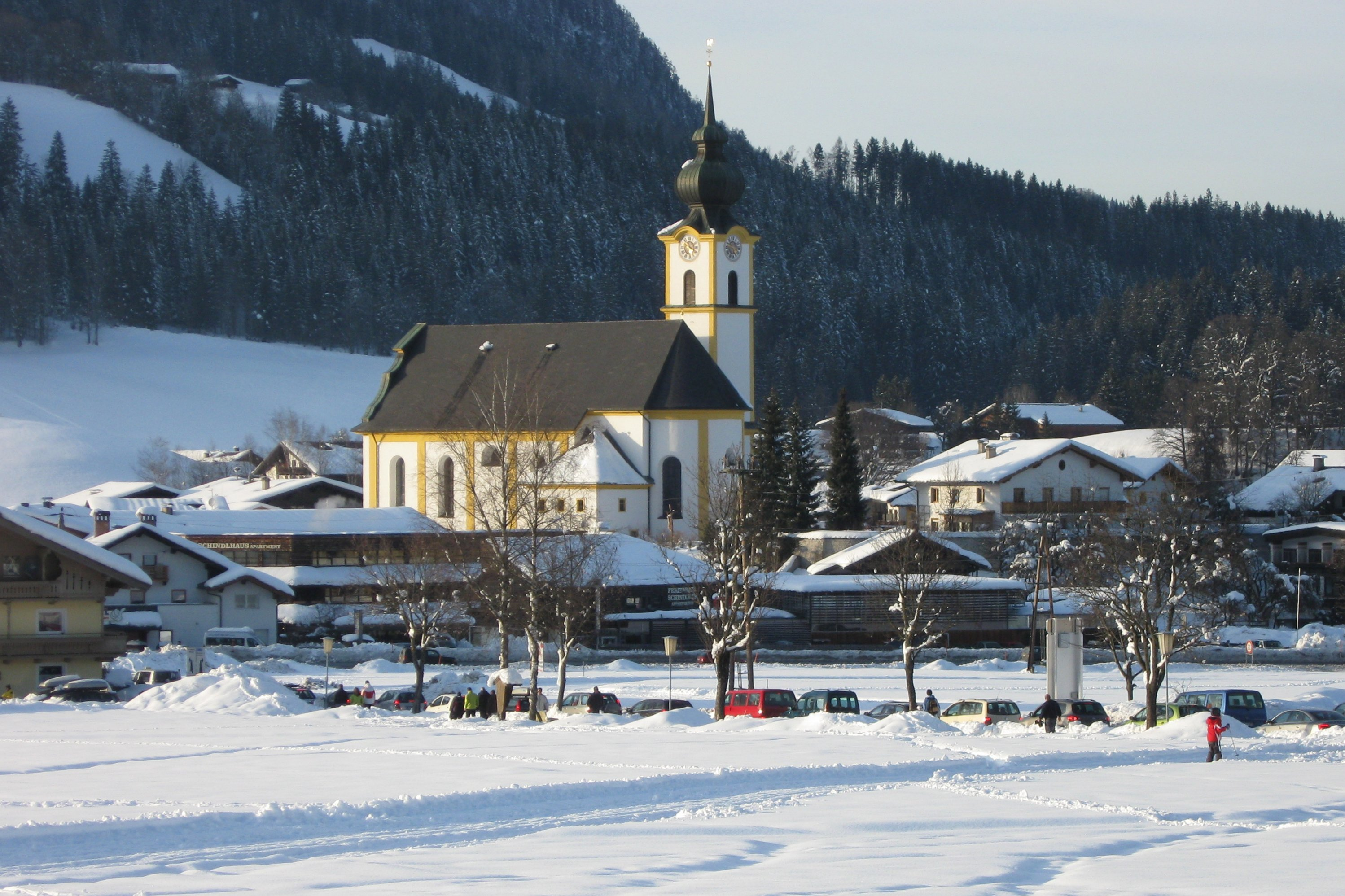
Baroque church Saint Peter and Paul

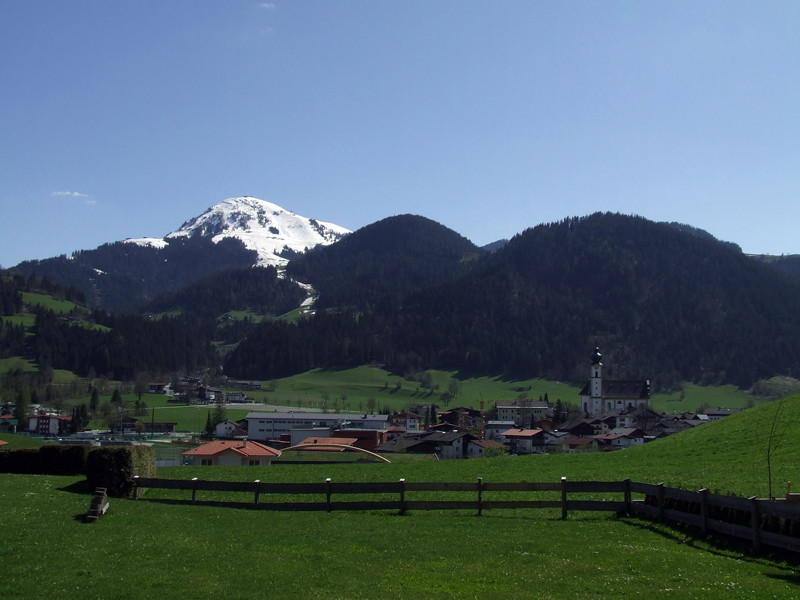
View of Söll and Hohe Salve Mountain

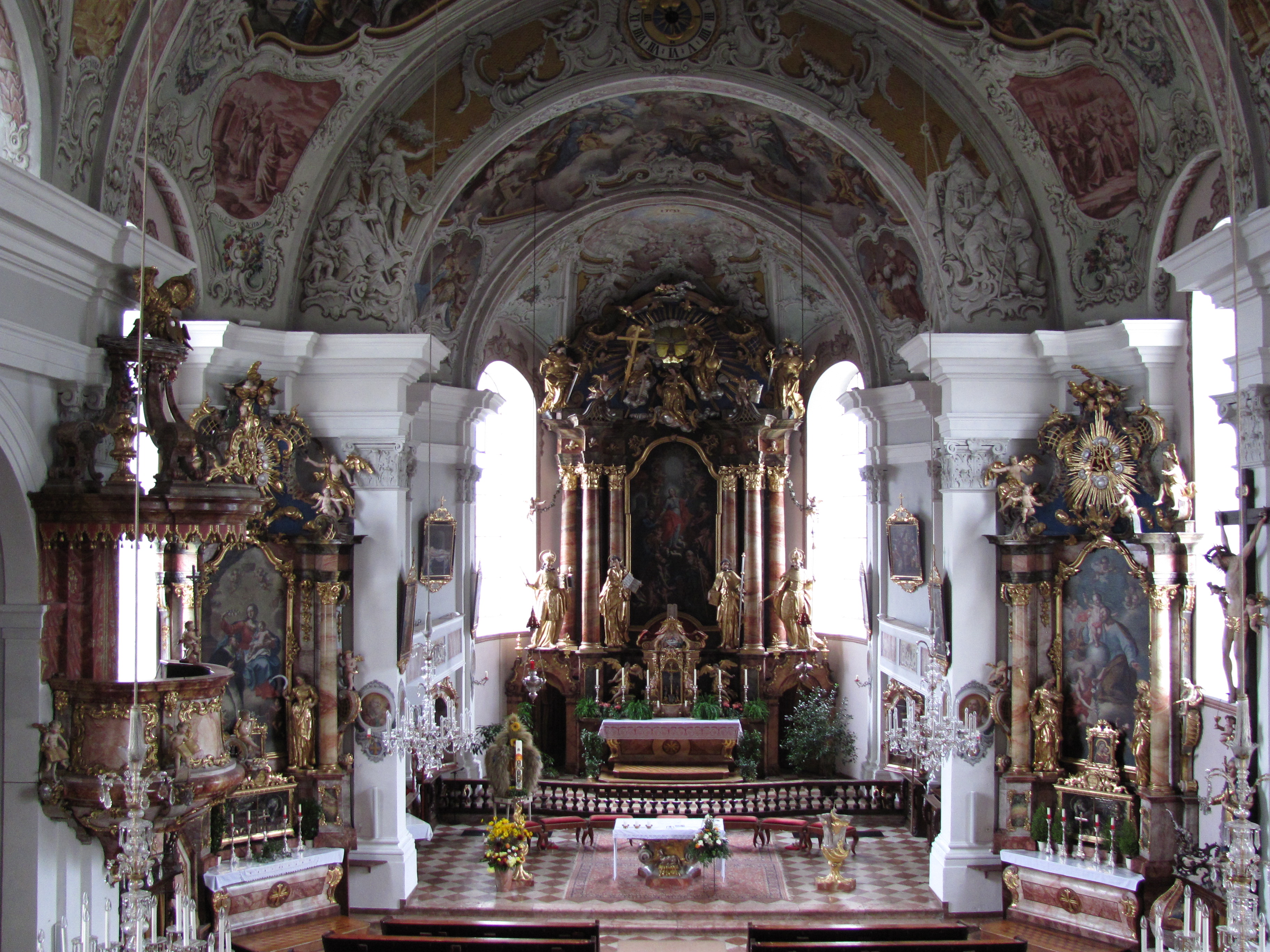
Parish church

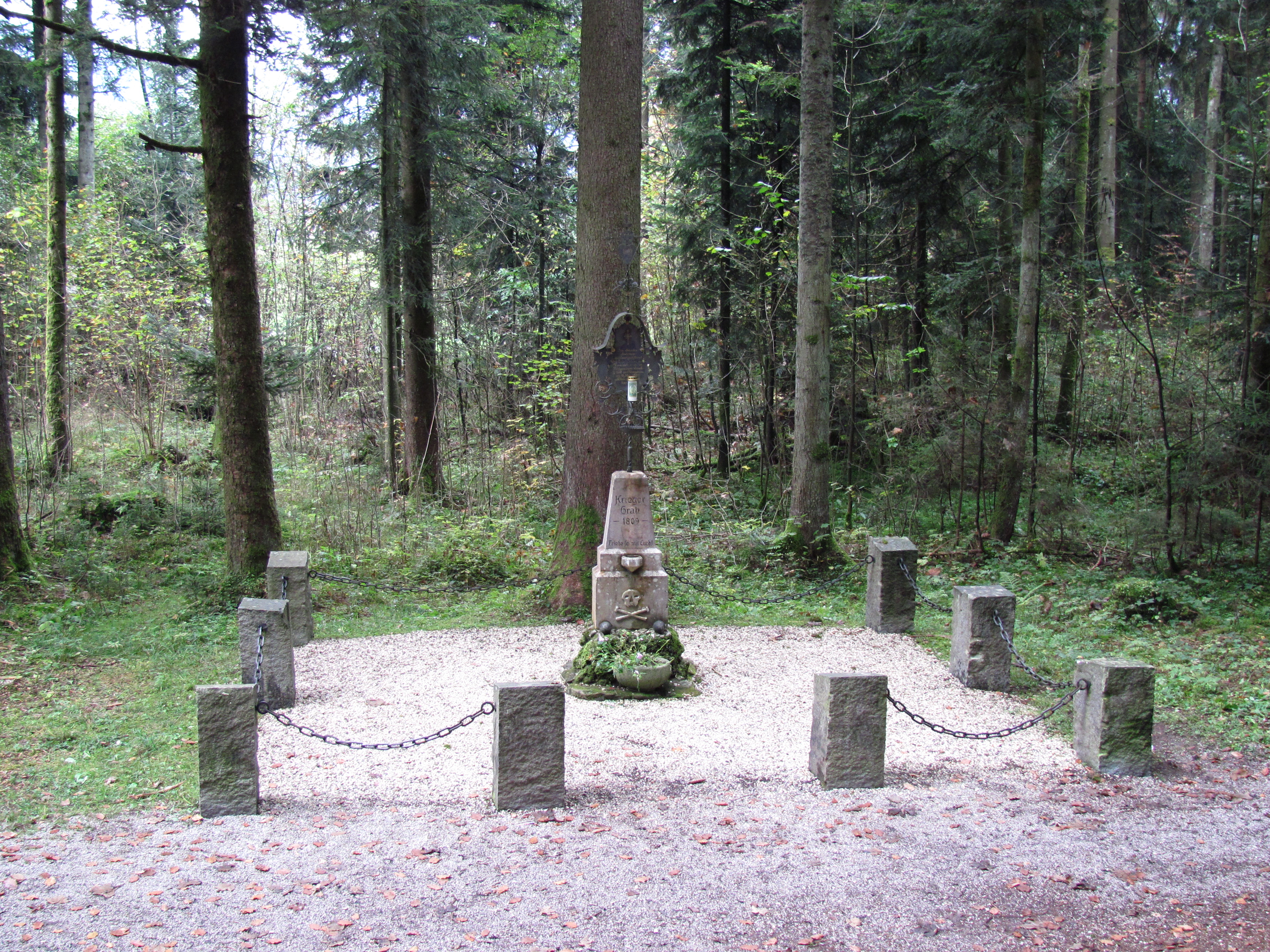
The War Memorial

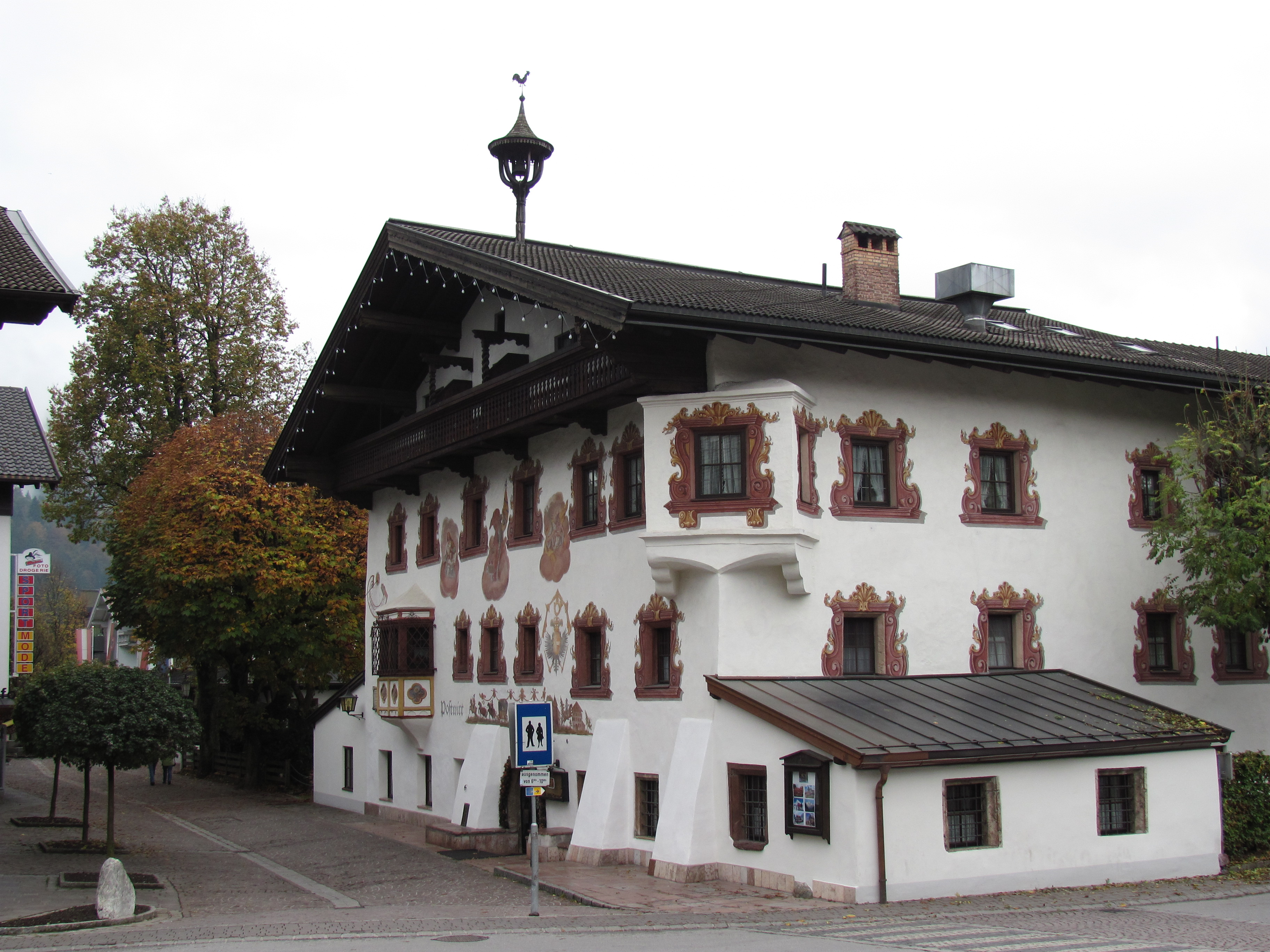
Local inn displaying traditional wall paintings

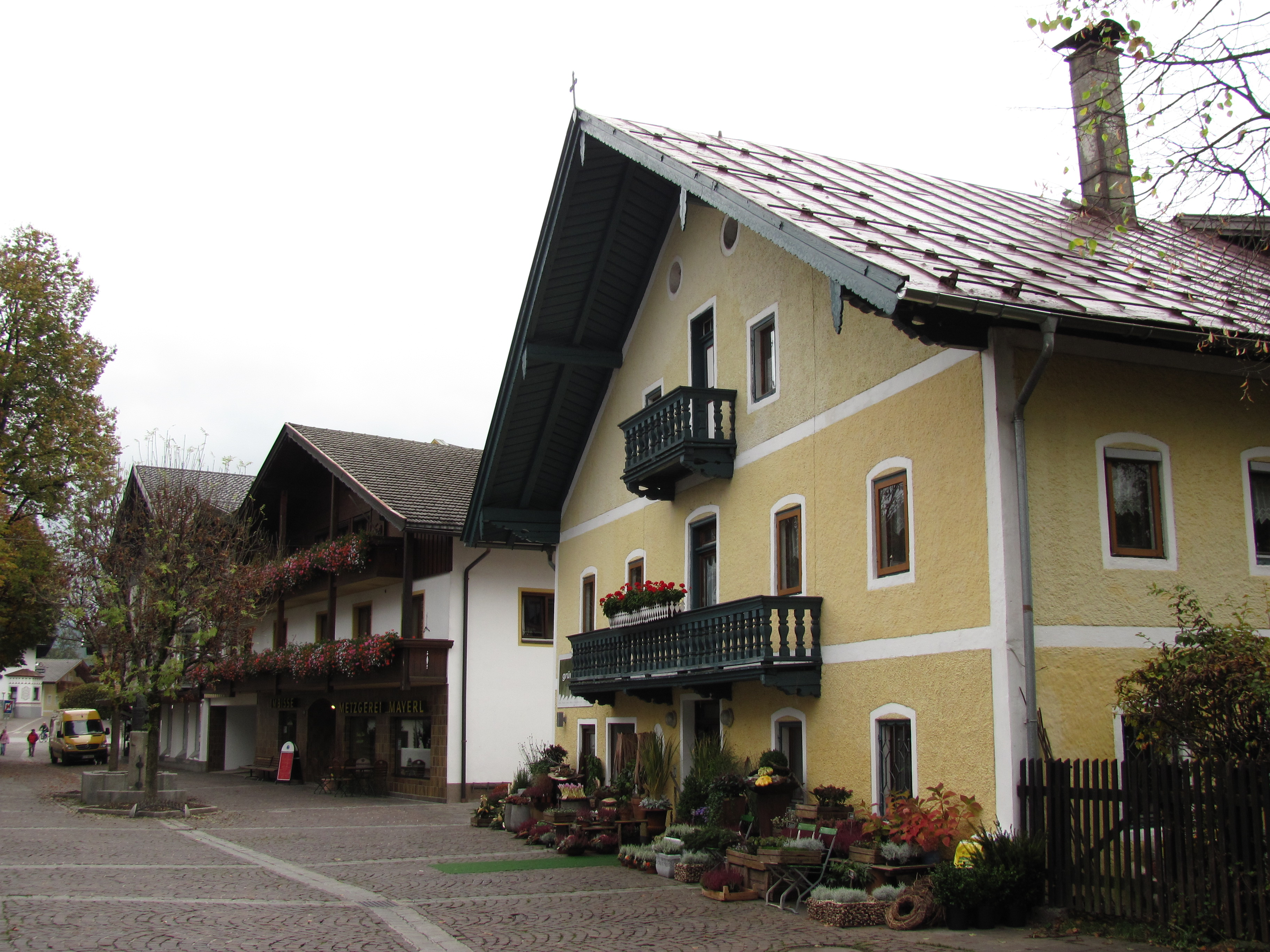
Traditional Tyrolean architecture on Main Street
