= Hohe Salve =

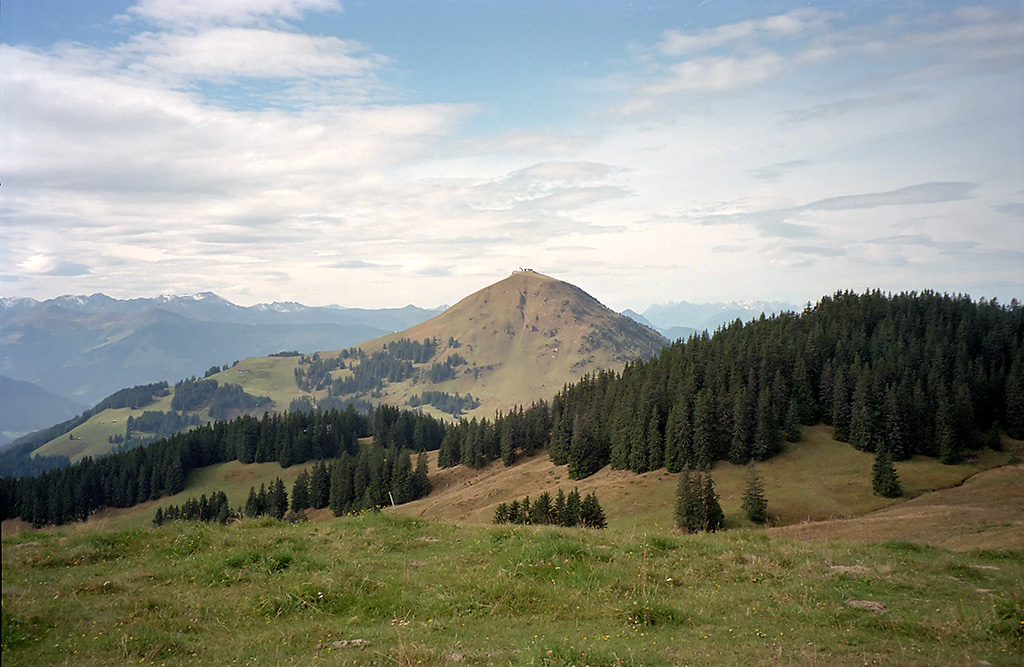
- The Hohe Salve from the east

Highest point
- Elevation: 1,828 m (AA) (5,997 ft)
- Coordinates: 47°27′57″N 12°12′21″E

Geography
- Location within Austria
- Location: Tyrol, Austria
- Parent range: Kitzbühel Alps

Climbing
- Easiest route: two gondola lifts, numerous footpaths

The Hohe Salve is a well-known mountain located between Kufstein, Wörgl and Kitzbühel in the Austrian state of Tyrol. It is part of the Kitzbühel Alps and is also nicknamed the Rigi of the Tyrol. Its summit is 1,828 m above sea level (AA) high, and in fine weather has a good view of the High Tauern and Zillertal Alps, as well as the Wilder Kaiser, which lies immediately to the north of the Hohe Salve. From the top the Großglockner and Großvenediger, Austria's highest and fourth highest mountain, respectively, can also be made out.

== Characteristics ==
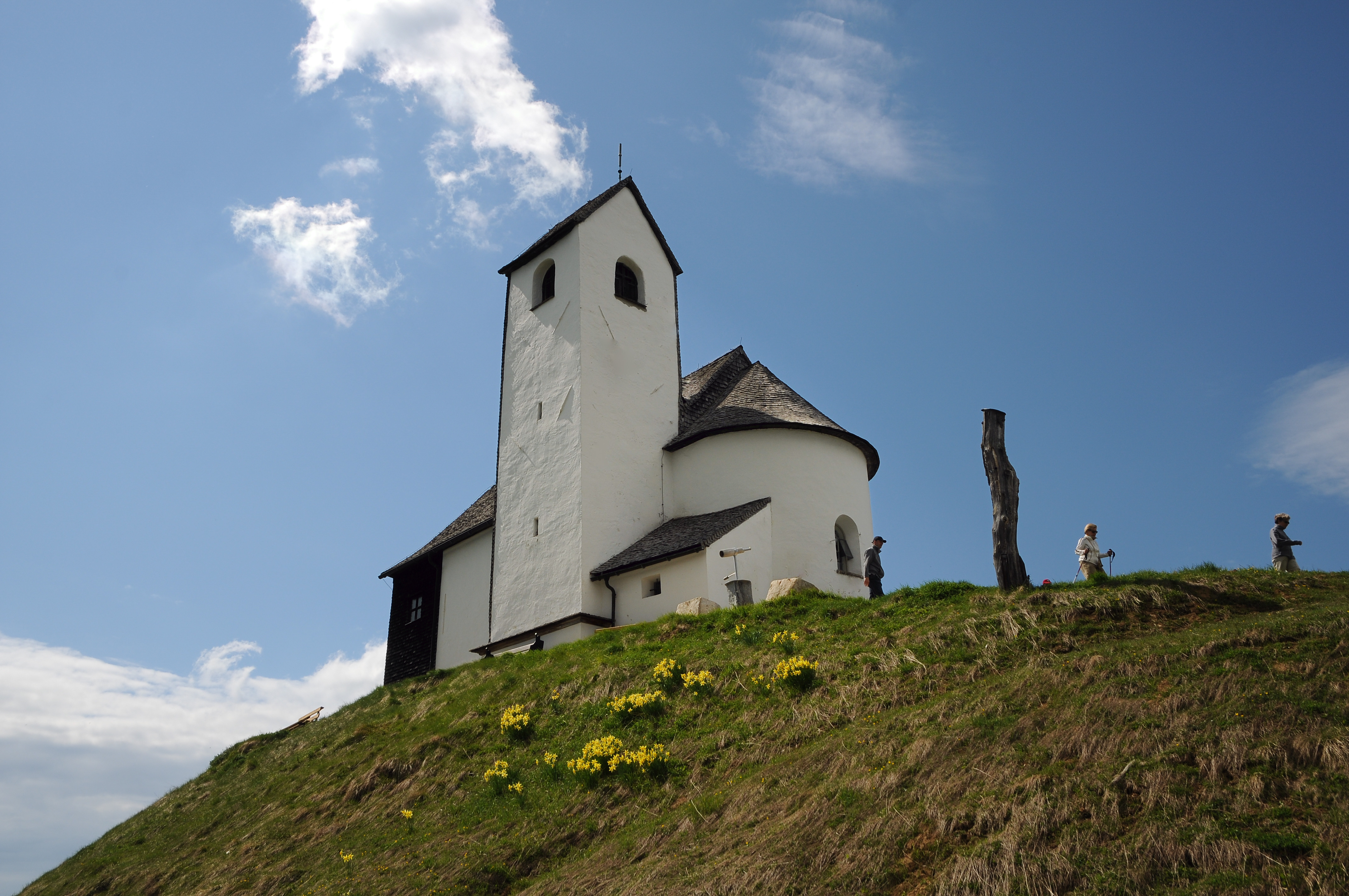
The western view of the Hohe Salve pilgrimage church

The mountain has a very striking conical appearance. On the summit is an old pilgrimage chapel, a restaurant and a transmission mast. In addition the peak is served by two gondola lifts from Söll and Hopfgarten. The summit restaurant and church belong to the parish of Westendorf; the transmission mast to Hopfgarten.

In winter the Hohe Salve is part of the Skiwelt Wilder Kaiser/Brixental ski region and there are several runs from the top into the surrounding villages of Söll, Itter, Hopfgarten and Brixen im Thale.

Because of its shape and location the Hohe Salve is also a popular start point for paragliders.

The name is probably a Rhaeto-Romance term.

== Hohe Salve transmission mast ==
The Hohe Salve transmitter stands on the territory of Hopfgarten and is operated by ORS. It broadcasts to northeast Tyrol, parts of the district of Miesbach and the district of Rosenheim in Bavaria as well as a small part of western Salzburg state.

== Gallery ==
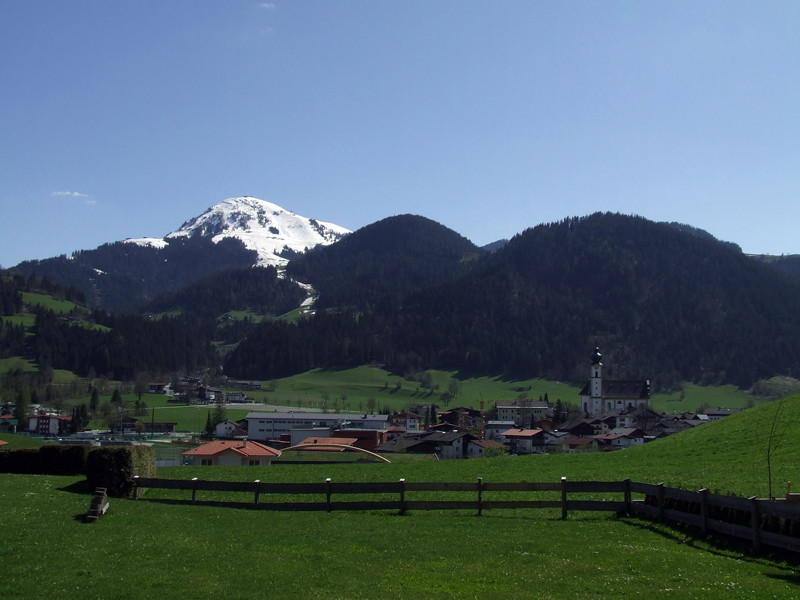
The Hohe Salve (snow-covered) seen from Söll (north side)

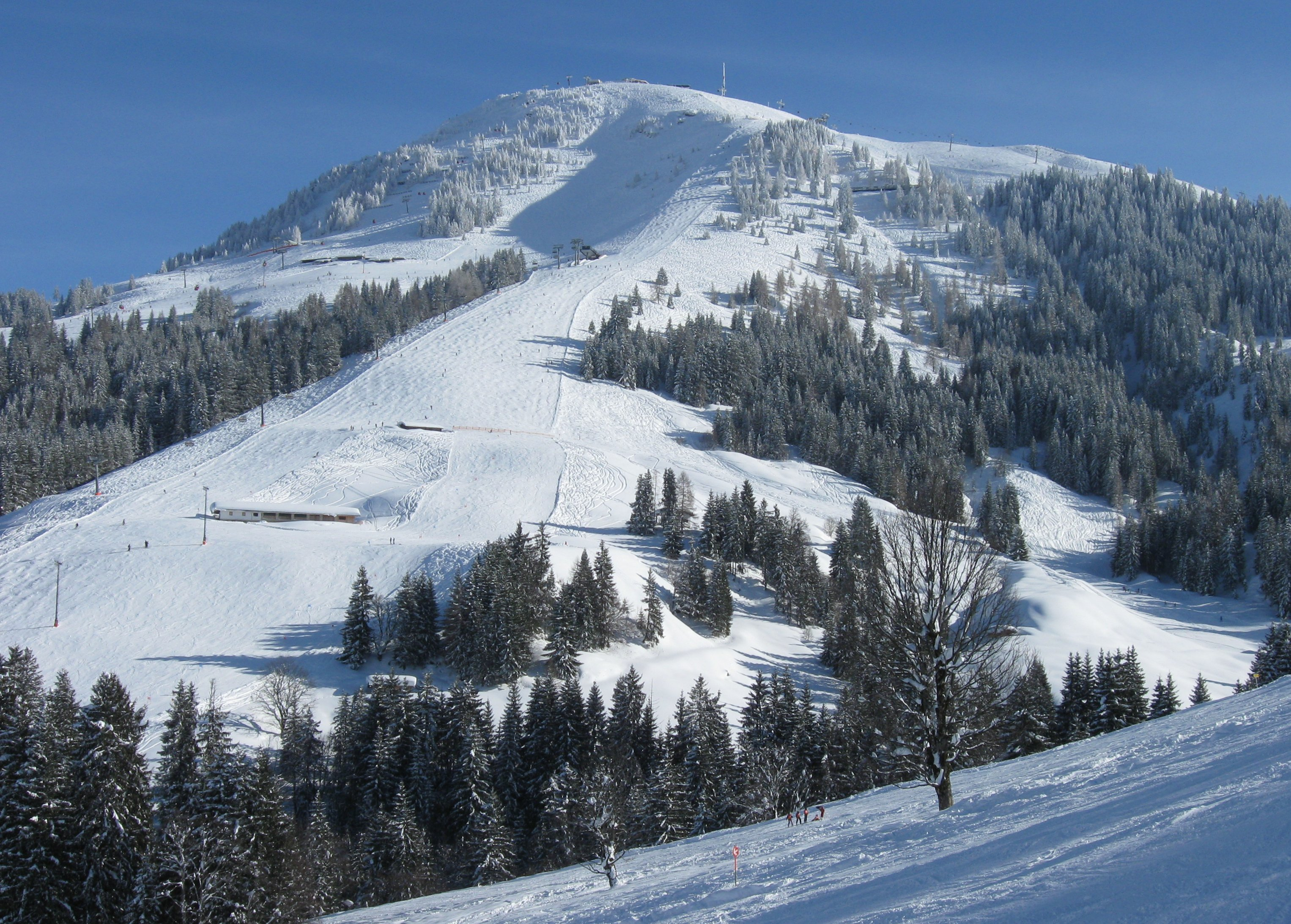
The northern slope of the mountain in winter

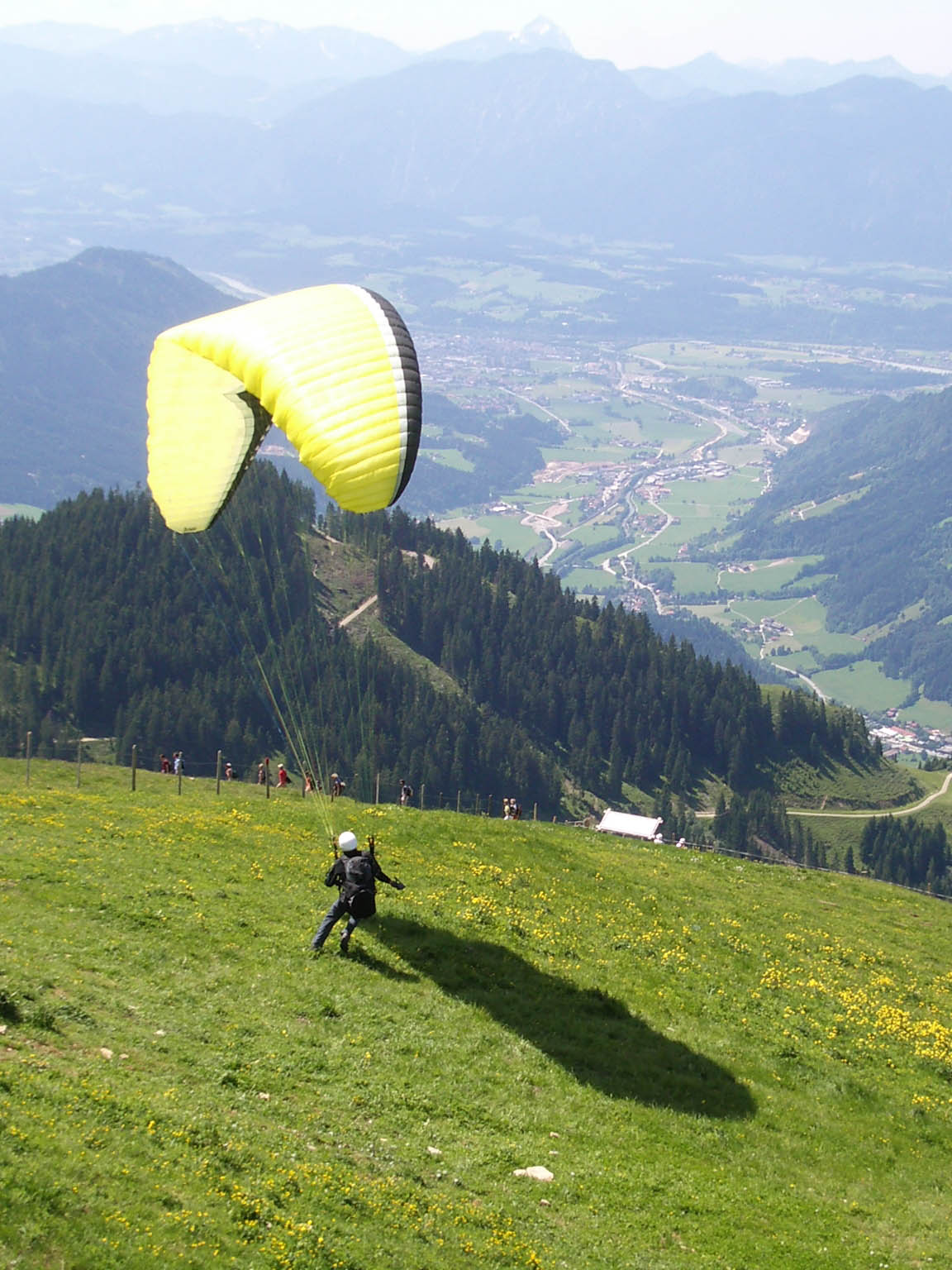
Start of a paraglider from the Hohe Salve

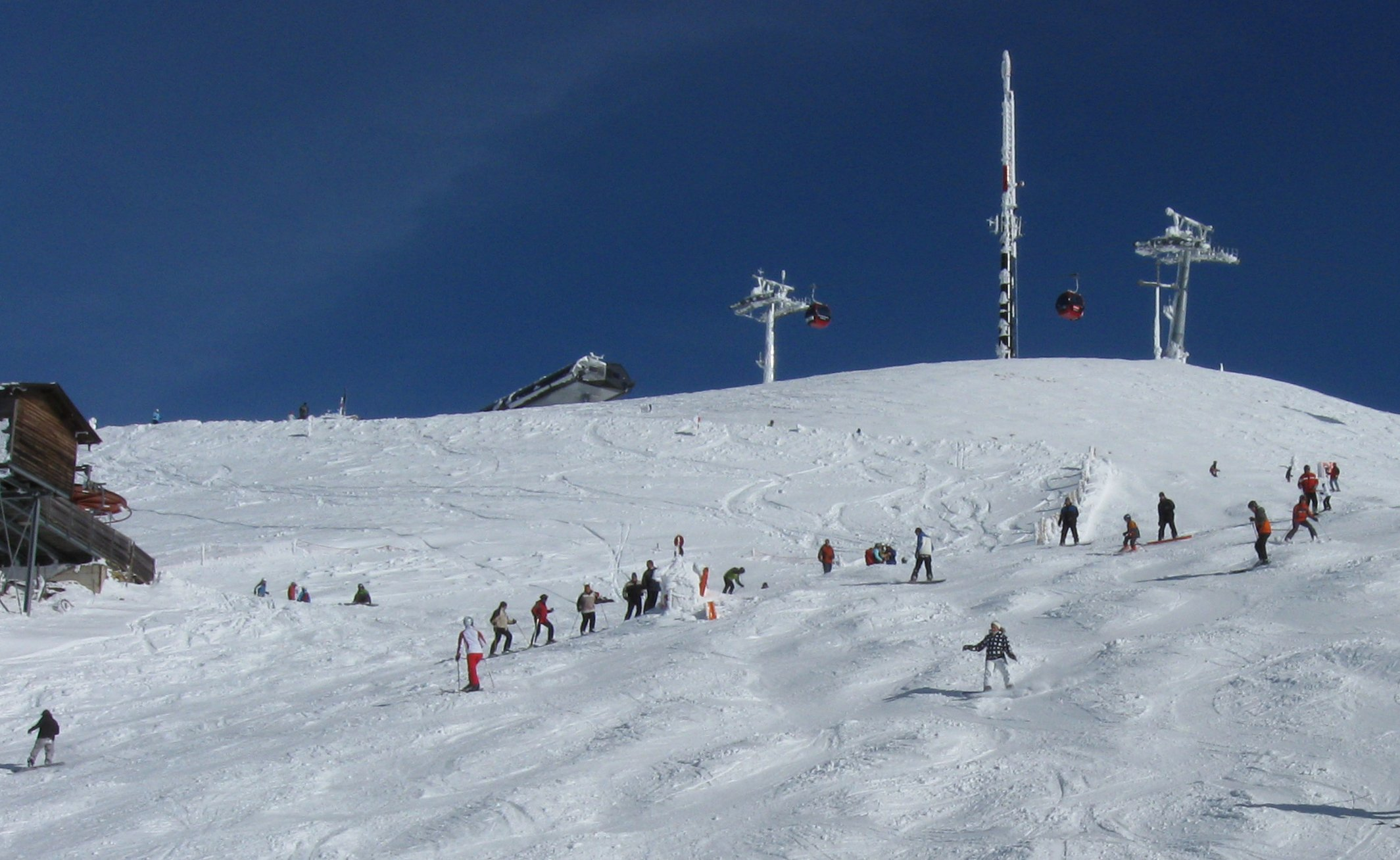
The transmission mast on the summit

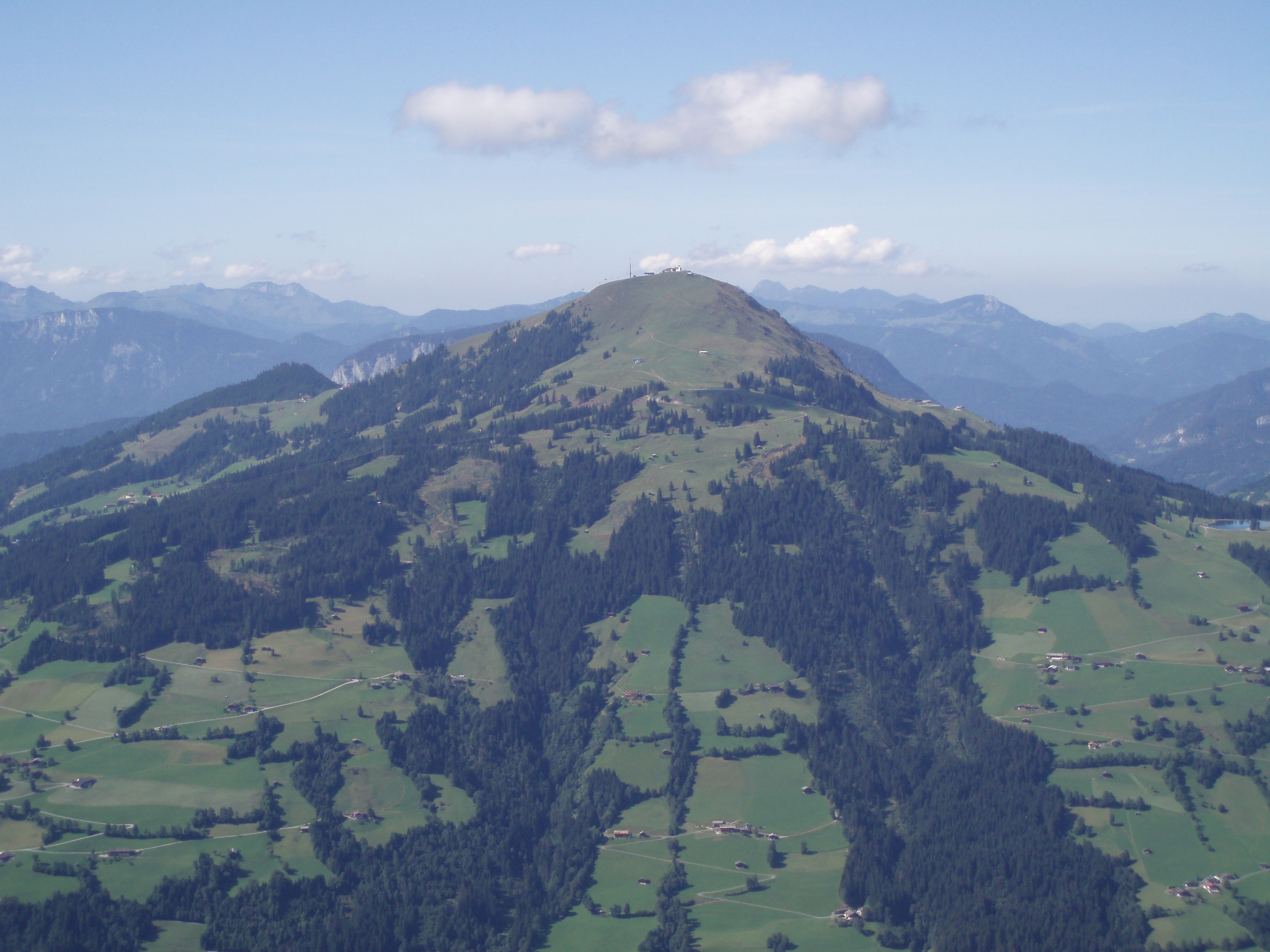
The south side of the Hohe Salve
