= Climbing Austrian Championships =

Climbing competition event

Climbing Austrian Championships are the annual national championships in competition climbing organised by the Austrian Climbing Association (Österreichischen Wettkletterverband, ÖWK) since 2005. Since 2019, they also include the Olympic combined format.

== Lead ==
As of: December 2020

=== Men ===
Year	Location	Gold	Silver	Bronze
2005	Großraming	Kilian Fischhuber	Thomas Neyer	Reinhard Fichtinger
2006	Graz	David Lama	Jürgen Reis	Roland Wagner
2007	Dornbirn	David Lama	Mario Lechner; Kilian Fischhuber	
2008	Großraming	Thomas Neyer	Kilian Fischhuber	David Lama
2009	Graz	David Lama	Jakob Schubert	Mario Lechner
2010	Vöcklabruck	Max Rudigier	Thomas Neyer	Mario Lechner
2011	Imst	Jakob Schubert	Mario Lechner	Lukas Köb
2012	Graz	Jakob Schubert	Mario Lechner	Bernhard Röck
2013	Mitterdorf im Mürztal	Jakob Schubert	Lukas Köb	Georg Parma
2014	Dornbirn	Jakob Schubert	Mario Lechner	Georg Parma
2015	Wolfsberg	Georg Parma	Max Rudigier	Matthias Schiestl
2016	Dornbirn	Jakob Schubert	Max Rudigier	Bernhard Röck
2017	Innsbruck	Jakob Schubert	Max Rudigier	Georg Parma
2018	Mitterdorf im Mürztal	Jakob Schubert	Max Rudigier	Mathias Posch
2019	Innsbruck	Jakob Schubert	Matthias Schiestl	Alfons Dornauer
2020	Innsbruck	Jakob Schubert	Stefan Scherz	Louis Gundolf

=== Women ===
Year	Location	Gold	Silver	Bronze
2005	Großraming	Angela Eiter	Barbara Bacher	Gerda Raffetseder
2006	Graz	Angela Eiter	Barbara Bacher	Katharina Saurwein
2007	Dornbirn	Angela Eiter	Bettina Schöpf; Katharina Saurwein	
2008	Großraming	Johanna Ernst	Angela Eiter; Barbara Bacher	
2009	Graz	Johanna Ernst	Christine Schranz	Barbara Bacher
2010	Vöcklabruck	Angela Eiter	Katharina Posch	Christine Schranz
2011	Imst	Angela Eiter	Johanna Ernst	Katharina Posch
2012	Graz	Johanna Ernst	Angela Eiter	Jessica Pilz
2013	Mitterdorf im Mürztal	Magdalena Röck	Jessica Pilz	Katharina Posch
2014	Dornbirn	Magdalena Röck	Katharina Posch	Jessica Pilz
2015	Wolfsberg	Jessica Pilz	Katharina Posch	Magdalena Röck
2016	Dornbirn	Jessica Pilz	Magdalena Röck	Katharina Posch
2017	Innsbruck	Jessica Pilz	Katharina Posch	Christine Schranz
2018	Mitterdorf im Mürztal	Jessica Pilz	Christine Schranz	Magdalena Röck
2019	Innsbruck	Jessica Pilz	Christine Schranz	Magdalena Röck
2020	Innsbruck	Jessica Pilz	Eva-Maria Hammelmüller	Christine Schranz

== Boulder ==
As of: December 2020

=== Men ===
Year	Location	Gold	Silver	Bronze
2005	Hall in Tirol	Kilian Fischhuber	Heiko Wilhelm	Martin Hammerer
2006	Innsbruck	Kilian Fischhuber	Lukas Ennemoser	Roland Wagner
2007	Waidhofen an der Ybbs	David Lama	Kilian Fischhuber	Kornelius Obleitner
2008	Innsbruck	Kilian Fischhuber	Tobias Haller	Emanuel Moosburger
2009	Mayrhofen	Mario Lechner	Lukas Ennemoser	Jakob Schubert
2010	Reith im Alpbachtal	Jakob Schubert	Kilian Fischhuber	Mario Lechner
2011	Zwettl	Lukas Ennemoser	Kilian Fischhuber	Max Rudigier
2012	Kitzbühel	Kilian Fischhuber	Christian Feistmantl	Lukas Ennemoser
2013	Innsbruck	Kilian Fischhuber	Jakob Schubert	Lukas Ennemoser
2014	Längenfeld	Kilian Fischhuber	Jakob Schubert	Lukas Ennemoser
2015	Zwettl	Lukas Ennemoser	Alfons Dornauer	Kilian Fischhuber
2016	Graz	Lukas Ennemoser	Georg Parma	Max Rudigier
2017	Waidhofen an der Ybbs	Kilian Fischhuber	Alfons Dornauer	Georg Parma
2018	Ried im Innkreis	Georg Parma	Jakob Schubert	Elias Weiler
2019	Innsbruck	Florian Klingler	Jakob Schubert	Elias Weiler
2020	Innsbruck	Nicolai Uznik	Elias Weiler	Matthias Erber

=== Women ===
Year	Location	Gold	Silver	Bronze
2005	Hall in Tirol	Anna Stöhr	Barbara Bacher	Martina Harnisch
2006	Innsbruck	Anna Stöhr	Barbara Bacher	Katharina Saurwein
2007	Waidhofen an der Ybbs	Barbara Bacher	Katharina Saurwein	Franziska Saurwein
2008	Innsbruck	Anna Stöhr	Johanna Ernst	Katharina Saurwein
2009	Mayrhofen	Barbara Bacher	Sabine Bacher	Martina Harnisch
2010	Reith im Alpbachtal	Anna Stöhr	Katharina Saurwein	Katharina Posch
2011	Zwettl	Anna Stöhr	Katharina Saurwein	Sabine Bacher
2012	Kitzbühel	Katharina Saurwein	Katharina Posch	Sabine Bacher
2013	Innsbruck	Anna Stöhr	Jessica Pilz	Katharina Saurwein
2014	Längenfeld	Katharina Saurwein	Franziska Sterrer	Jessica Pilz
2015	Zwettl	Jessica Pilz	Franziska Sterrer	Anna Vollenwyder
2016	Graz	Anna Stöhr	Jessica Pilz	Franziska Sterrer
2017	Waidhofen an der Ybbs	Anna Stöhr	Berit Schwaiger	Katharina Saurwein
2018	Ried im Innkreis	Jessica Pilz	Celina Schoibl	Mattea Pötzi
2019	Innsbruck	Jessica Pilz	Mattea Pötzi	Julia Lotz
2020	Innsbruck	Johanna Färber	Jessica Pilz	Eva-Maria Hammelmüller

== Speed ==
As of: December 2020

=== Men ===
Year	Location	Gold	Silver	Bronze
2005	Imst	Mark Amann	Andreas Knabl	Martin Breitwieser
2006	Graz	Mark Amann	Jan Haiko	Roland Wagner
2007	Dornbirn	Mark Amann	Jan Haiko	Lukas Köb
2008	Großraming	Mark Amann	Mario Lechner	Max Rudigier
2009	Graz	Mark Amann	Jan Haiko	Max Rudigier
2010	Vöcklabruck	Mark Amann	Max Rudigier	Peter Putz
2011	Imst	Mark Amann	Laurenz Rudigier	Fabian Leu
2012	Imst	Thomas Lach	Mark Amann	Fabian Leu
2013	Mitterdorf im Mürztal	Mark Amann	Thomas Lach	Matthias Erber
2014	Dornbirn	Andreas Aufschnaiter	Matthias Erber	Thomas Lach
2015	Gaflenz	Lukas Knapp	Matthias Erber	Laurin Meusburger
2016	Gaflenz	Lukas Knapp	Matthias Erber	Thomas Lach
2017	Innsbruck	Andreas Aufschnaiter	Matthias Erber	Tobias Plangger
2018	Mitterdorf im Mürztal	Lukas Knapp	Tobias Plangger	Matthias Erber
2019	Innsbruck	Matthias Erber	Tobias Plangger	Andreas Aufschnaiter
2020	Innsbruck	Tobias Plangger	Matthias Erber	Lawrence Bogeschdorfer

=== Women ===
Year	Location	Gold	Silver	Bronze
2005	Imst	Stefanie Kofler	Sabine Knabl	Regina Knabl
2006	Graz	Stefanie Kofler	Martina Harnisch	Katharina Saurwein
2007	Dornbirn	Stefanie Pichler	Stefanie Kofler	Pia Meschik
2008	Großraming	Stefanie Pichler	Stefanie Kofler	Pia Meschik
2009	Graz	Stefanie Pichler	Pia Meschik	Madeleine Eppensteiner
2010	Vöcklabruck	Barbara Bacher	Alexandra Elmer	Katharina Bacher
2011	Imst	Jacqueline Sabutsch	Barbara Bacher	Yvonne Valtan
2012	Imst	Stefanie Pichler	Alexandra Elmer	Nina Lach
2013	Mitterdorf im Mürztal	Stefanie Pichler	Nina Lach	Alexandra Elmer
2014	Dornbirn	Alexandra Elmer	Nina Lach	Lena Engstler
2015	Gaflenz	Alexandra Elmer	Nina Lach	Stefanie Pichler
2016	Gaflenz	Nina Lach	Laura Stöckler	Jessica Pilz
2017	Innsbruck	Alexandra Elmer	Laura Lammer	Nina Lach
2018	Mitterdorf im Mürztal	Laura Lammer	Alexandra Elmer	Nina Lach
2019	Innsbruck	Alexandra Elmer	Laura Stöckler	Sandra Lettner
2020	Innsbruck	Alexandra Elmer	Laura Stöckler	Mona Jenewein

== Combined ==
As of: December 2020

=== Men ===
Year	Location	Gold	Silver	Bronze
2019	Innsbruck	Jakob Schubert	Nicolai Uznik	Matthias Erber
2020	Innsbruck	Stefan Scherz	Georg Parma	Tobias Plangger

=== Women ===
Year	Location	Gold	Silver	Bronze
2019	Innsbruck	Jessica Pilz	Sandra Lettner	Julia Lotz
2020	Innsbruck	Eva-Maria Hammelmüller	Jessica Pilz	Sandra Lettner
