= 2019 in sport climbing =

This article lists the main competition climbing events and their results for 2019. This includes the World Cup, World Championships, International Climbing Series, and Continental Championships.

== World Cup ==
Date	Location	Competition	Discipline	Men	Women
April 5 – October 27	Various	World Cup	Bouldering (6)	(Japan) Tomoa Narasaki	(Slovenia) Janja Garnbret
April 5 – October 27	Various	World Cup	Lead (6)	(Czech Republic) Adam Ondra	(South Korea) Chaehyun Seo
April 5 – October 27	Various	World Cup	Speed (6)	(France) Bassa Mawem	(China) YiLing Song
April 5 – October 27	Various	World Cup	Combined	(Japan) Tomoa Narasaki	(Slovenia) Janja Garnbret

== World Championships ==
Date	Location	Competition	Discipline		Men	Women
August 11–21	Hachiōji, Japan	World Championships	Bouldering		(Japan) Tomoa Narasaki	(Slovenia) Janja Garnbret
August 11–21	Hachiōji, Japan	World Championships	Lead		(Czech Republic) Adam Ondra	(Slovenia) Janja Garnbret
August 11–21	Hachiōji, Japan	World Championships	Speed		(Italy) Ludovico Fossali	(Poland) Aleksandra Miroslaw
August 11–21	Hachiōji, Japan	World Championships	Combined		(Japan) Tomoa Narasaki	(Slovenia) Janja Garnbret
August 22–31	Arco, Italy	World Youth Championships	Lead	Junior	(Japan) Shuta Tanaka	(Italy) Laura Rogora
August 22–31	Arco, Italy	World Youth Championships	Lead	Youth A	(Japan) Hidemasa Nishida	(Ukraine) Nika Potapova
August 22–31	Arco, Italy	World Youth Championships	Lead	Youth B	(Japan) Junta Sekiguchi	(France) Oriane Bertone
August 22–31	Arco, Italy	World Youth Championships	Bouldering	Junior	(Japan) Sohta Amagasa	(Italy) Laura Rogora
August 22–31	Arco, Italy	World Youth Championships	Bouldering	Youth A	(Japan) Ao Yurikusa	(France) Luce Douady
August 22–31	Arco, Italy	World Youth Championships	Bouldering	Youth B	(Thailand) Nichol Tomas	(France) Oriane Bertone
August 22–31	Arco, Italy	World Youth Championships	Speed	Junior	(Russia) Sergey Rukin	(Russia) Elena Remizova
August 22–31	Arco, Italy	World Youth Championships	Speed	Youth A	(Russia) Iaroslav Pashkov	(United States) Emma Hunt
August 22–31	Arco, Italy	World Youth Championships	Speed	Youth B	(Ukraine) Hryhorii Ilchyshyn	(United States) Callie Close
August 22–31	Arco, Italy	World Youth Championships	Combined	Junior	(Japan) Sohta Amagasa	(Italy) Laura Rogora
August 22–31	Arco, Italy	World Youth Championships	Combined	Youth A	(Japan) Ao Yurikusa	(Japan) Natsumi Hirano
August 22–31	Arco, Italy	World Youth Championships	Combined	Youth B	(Japan) Junta Sekiguchi	(Slovenia) Sara Copar

== Continental Championships ==
Date	Location	Competition	Discipline	Men	Women
September 5–7	Zakopane, Poland	European Championships	Bouldering	(France) Mickaël Mawem	(Slovenia) Urska Repusic
October 4–6	(United Kingdom) Edinburgh, Britain	European Championships	Lead	(Czech Republic) Adam Ondra	(Slovenia) Lucka Rakovec
October 4–6	(United Kingdom) Edinburgh, Britain	European Championships	Speed	(Russia) Vladislav Deulin	(Poland) Aleksandra Miroslaw
November 6–10	Bogor, Indonesia	Asian Championships	Lead	(Japan) Kokoro Fujii	(South Korea) Chaehyun Seo
November 6–10	Bogor, Indonesia	Asian Championships	Bouldering	(Japan) Katsura Konishi	(South Korea) Chaehyun Seo
November 6–10	Bogor, Indonesia	Asian Championships	Speed	(Indonesia) Veddriq Leonardo	(Indonesia) Nurul Iqamah
November 6–10	Bogor, Indonesia	Asian Championships	Combined	(Japan) Kokoro Fujii	(Indonesia) Nurul Iqamah

== National competitions ==
Date	Location	Competition	Discipline	Men	Women
January 26–27	Komazawa Olympic Park, Setagaya ward, Tokyo	Japan Cup	Bouldering	(Japan) Taisei Ishimatsu	(Japan) Miho Nonaka
February 10	Akishima city, Tokyo	Japan Cup	Speed	(Japan) Yudai Ikeda	(Japan) Miho Nonaka
March 2–3	Inzai city, Chiba Prefecture	Japan Cup	Lead	(Japan) Kokoro Fujii	(Japan) Akiyo Noguchi
May 25–26	Saijō city, Ehime Prefecture	Japan Cup	Combined	(Japan) Tomoa Narasaki	(Japan) Miho Nonaka
June 14–16	Celje, Slovenia	Slovenian Championships	Combined	(Slovenia) Jernej Kruder	(Slovenia) Janja Garnbret
June 13–16	Innsbruck, Austria	Austrian Championships	Speed	(Austria) Matthias Erber	(Austria) Alexandra Elmer
June 13–16	Innsbruck, Austria	Austrian Championships	Bouldering	(Austria) Florian Klingler	(Austria) Jessica Pilz
June 13–16	Innsbruck, Austria	Austrian Championships	Lead	(Austria) Jakob Schubert	(Austria) Jessica Pilz
June 13–16	Innsbruck, Austria	Austrian Championships	Combined	(Austria) Jakob Schubert	(Austria) Jessica Pilz

== Others ==
Date	Location	Competition	Discipline	Men	Women
March 23–24	Pfungstadt, Germany	Studio Bloc Masters	Bouldering	(Slovenia) Anze Peharc	(Slovenia) Janja Garnbret
April 19–21	Hiroshima, Japan	FISE World Series Hiroshima	Bouldering	(Japan) Keita Dohi	(Japan) Ryu Nakagawa
May 12	Akishima, Japan	au Speed Stars	Speed	(Italy) Ludovico Fossali	(Poland) Anna Brozek
May 24–25	Ljubljana, Slovenia	Triglav The Rock Ljubljana	Bouldering	(Russia) Alexey Rubtsov	(Slovenia) Janja Garnbret
August 31	Arco, Italy	Rock Master	Duel (Lead/Speed)	(Austria) Jakob Schubert	(Slovenia) Mia Krampl
September 13–14	Stuttgart, Germany	Adidas Rockstars	Bouldering	(Japan) Yoshiyuki Ogata	(Japan) Futaba Ito
October 31–November 3	Guangzhou, China	China Open	Combined	(Japan) Keita Dohi	(Japan) Miho Nonaka
November 28–December 1	Toulouse, France	Olympic Qualifying Event	Combined	(Japan) Kokoro Fujii	(Japan) Futaba Ito
