= Brixlegg =

- Municipality
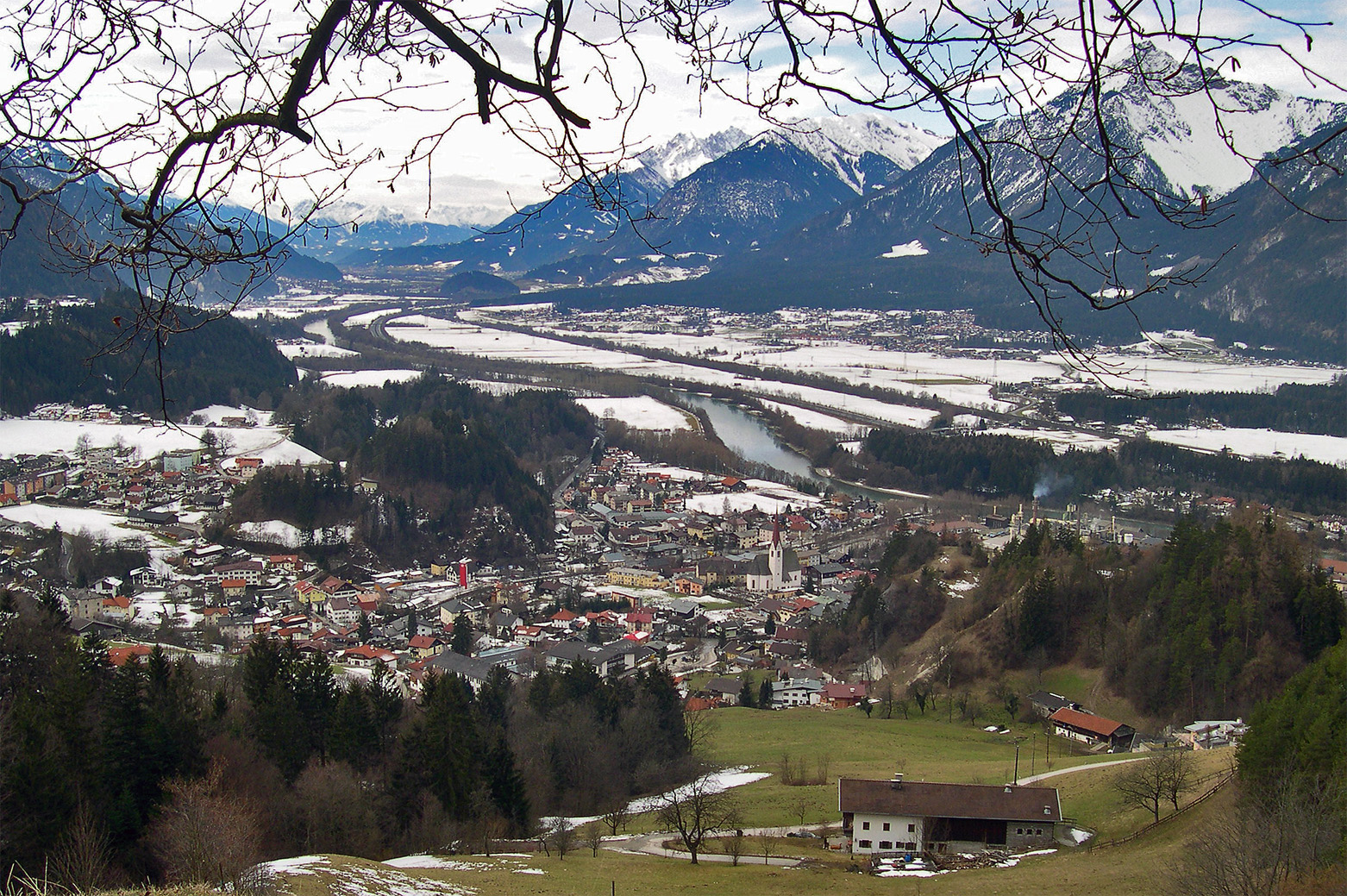
- Brixlegg

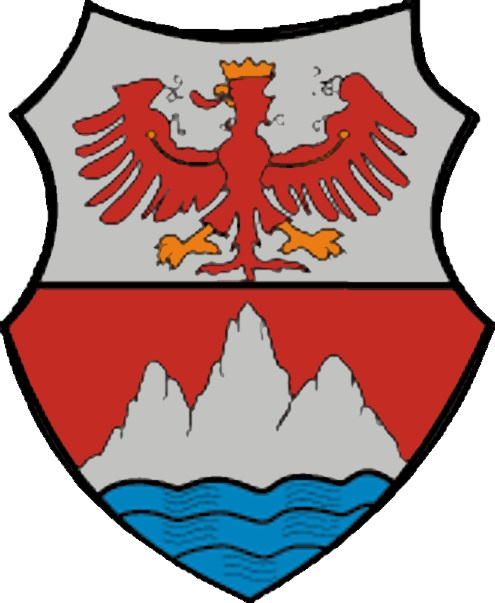
- Coat of arms

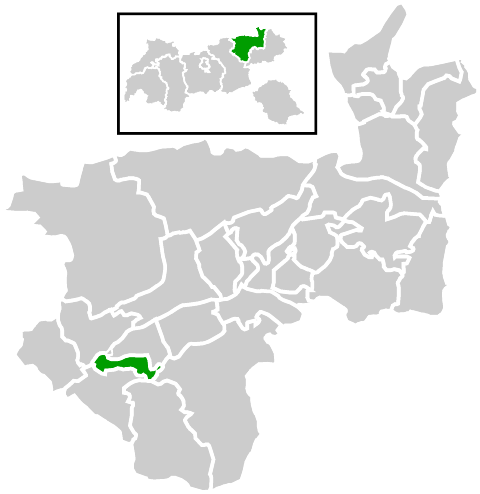
- Location within Kufstein district

- Location within Austria
- Coordinates: 47°25′45″N 11°52′39″E
- Country: Austria
- State: Tyrol
- District: Kufstein

Government
  - Mayor: Rudolf Puecher (ÖVP)

Area
  - Total: 9.11 km^{2} (3.52 sq mi)
- Elevation: 534 m (1,752 ft)

Population (2022)
  - Total: 3,044
  - Density: 334/km^{2} (865/sq mi)
- Time zone: UTC+1 (CET)
  - Summer (DST): UTC+2 (CEST)
- Postal code: 6230
- Area code: 05337
- Vehicle registration: KU
- Website: www.brixlegg.tirol.gv.at

Brixlegg is a market town (since 1927) in the Kufstein district in the Austrian state of Tyrol. The town lies in the Lower Inn Valley and at the entrance of the Alpbachtal.

== Neighbouring municipalities ==
Alpbach, Kramsach, Radfeld, Rattenberg, Reith im Alpbachtal, Wildschönau

== History ==
The town was first mentioned as „Prisslech“ in documents in 788, although the settlement is considered to be much older.

== Sights ==
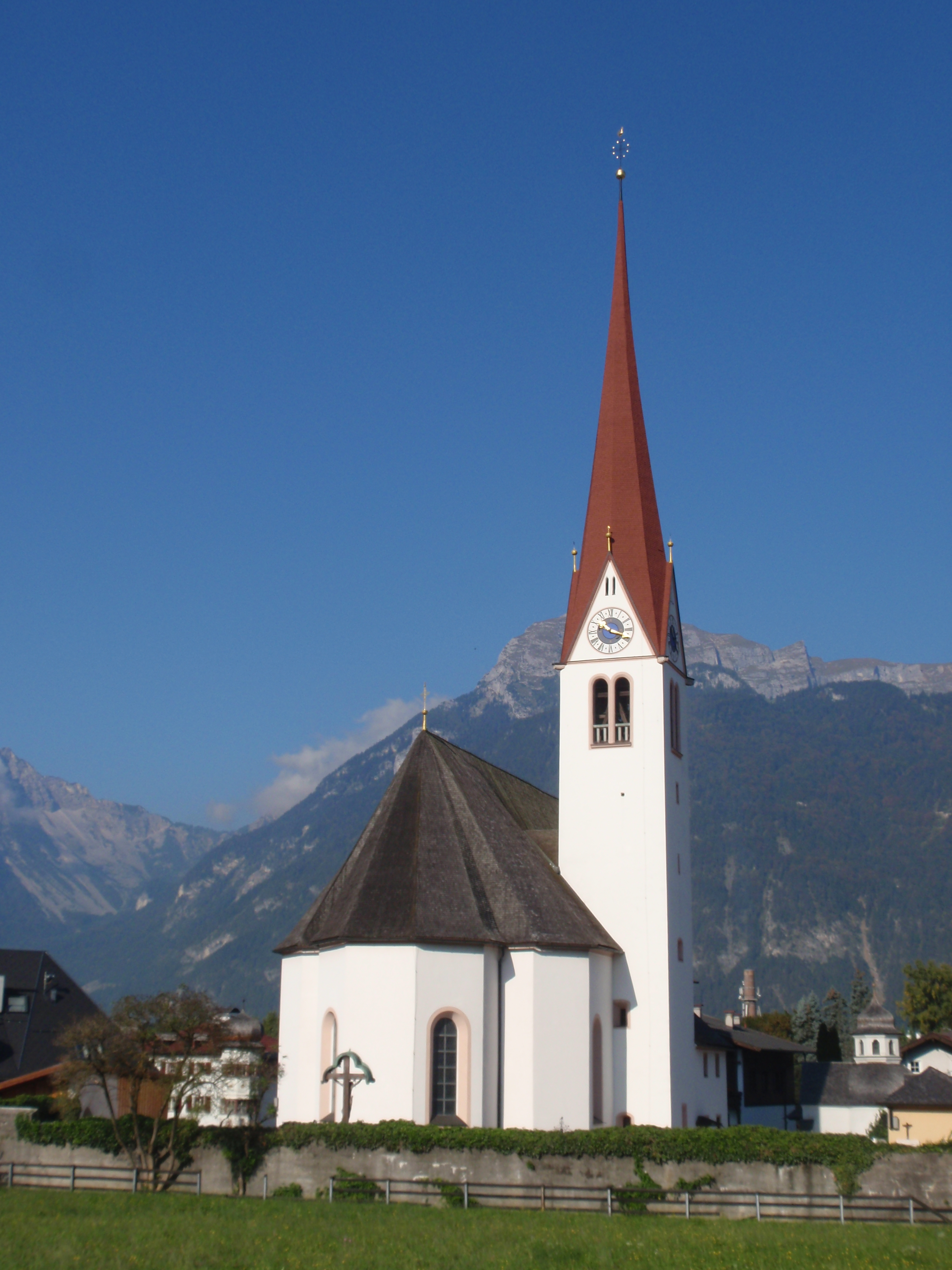
Parish church

- Parish church "Unsere Liebe Frau" ("Our Lady")
- Mühlbichl chapel and war memorial
- Lanegg tower house
- Granary building on the bank of the river Inn
- Museum of Mining and Metallurgy

== People ==
- Stephan Eberharter, Alpine ski racer and Olympic champion
- Matthias Rebitsch, Alpinist
- Karlheinz Töchterle, Federal Minister of Science and Research
- Karl Pearson visited here on Sunday 2 September 1883 and wrote about the passion play

== Economy ==
The Montanwerke Brixlegg AG is the only copper producer in Austria and specialises in the recovery of copper and other valuable metals from scrap copper and other secondary materials with copper content. The first mention of a copper and silver refinery in Brixlegg in documents dates back to 1463. At the beginning of the 20th century, following a decline in ore extraction in Tyrol, production was shifted to the recovery of copper from scrap metal alloys.

Further employers are the textiles industry (Giesswein company, founded in 1954), Production of bottled mineral water and non-alcoholic drinks (Silberquelle) and tourism (with a focus on winter tourism).

== Sports ==
It is famous amongst the skateboard scene for "The Cradle" a large outdoor skatearena, that also hosts international competitions.

== Town twinning ==
Aichach (Germany)
