= Großer Galtenberg =

Mountain in Austria

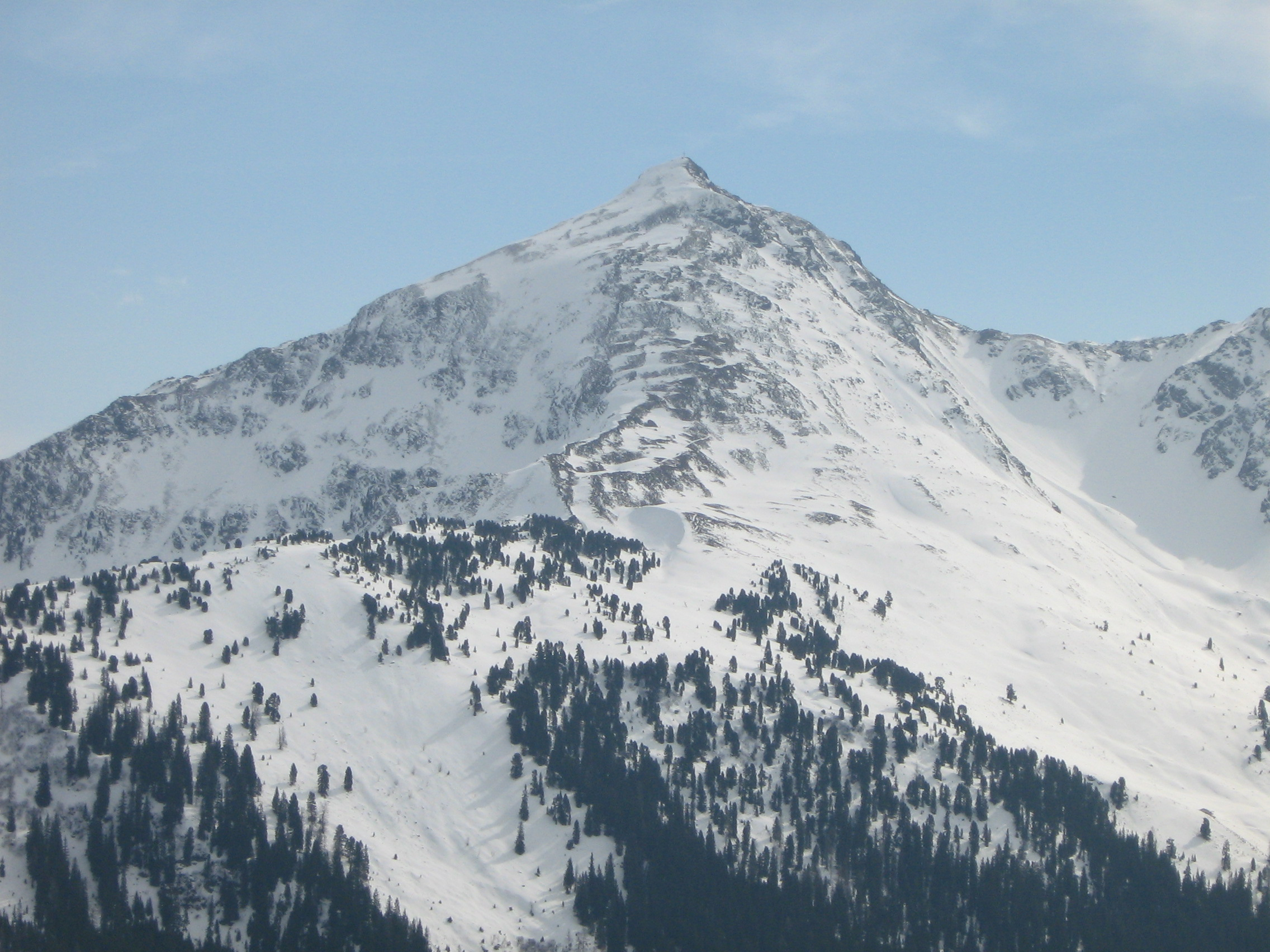
- The Großer Galtenberg seen from the Wiedersberger Horn (roughly from the west)

Highest point
- Elevation: 2,424 m (AA) (7,953 ft)
- Coordinates: 47°20′12″N 11°58′33″E

Geography
- Location within Austria
- Location: Tyrol, Austria
- Parent range: Kitzbühel Alps

The Großer Galtenberg is the highest mountain in the Alpbach valley in the Austrian state of Tyrol and belongs to the Kitzbühel Alps. It is 2,424 m (AA) high, is located at the southern end of the Alpbach valley and may be approached from the Alpbach suburb of Inneralpbach. The Alpbachtal ski region is located opposite the Galtenberg. From the summit there are views of Wildschönau and the Alpbach valley.

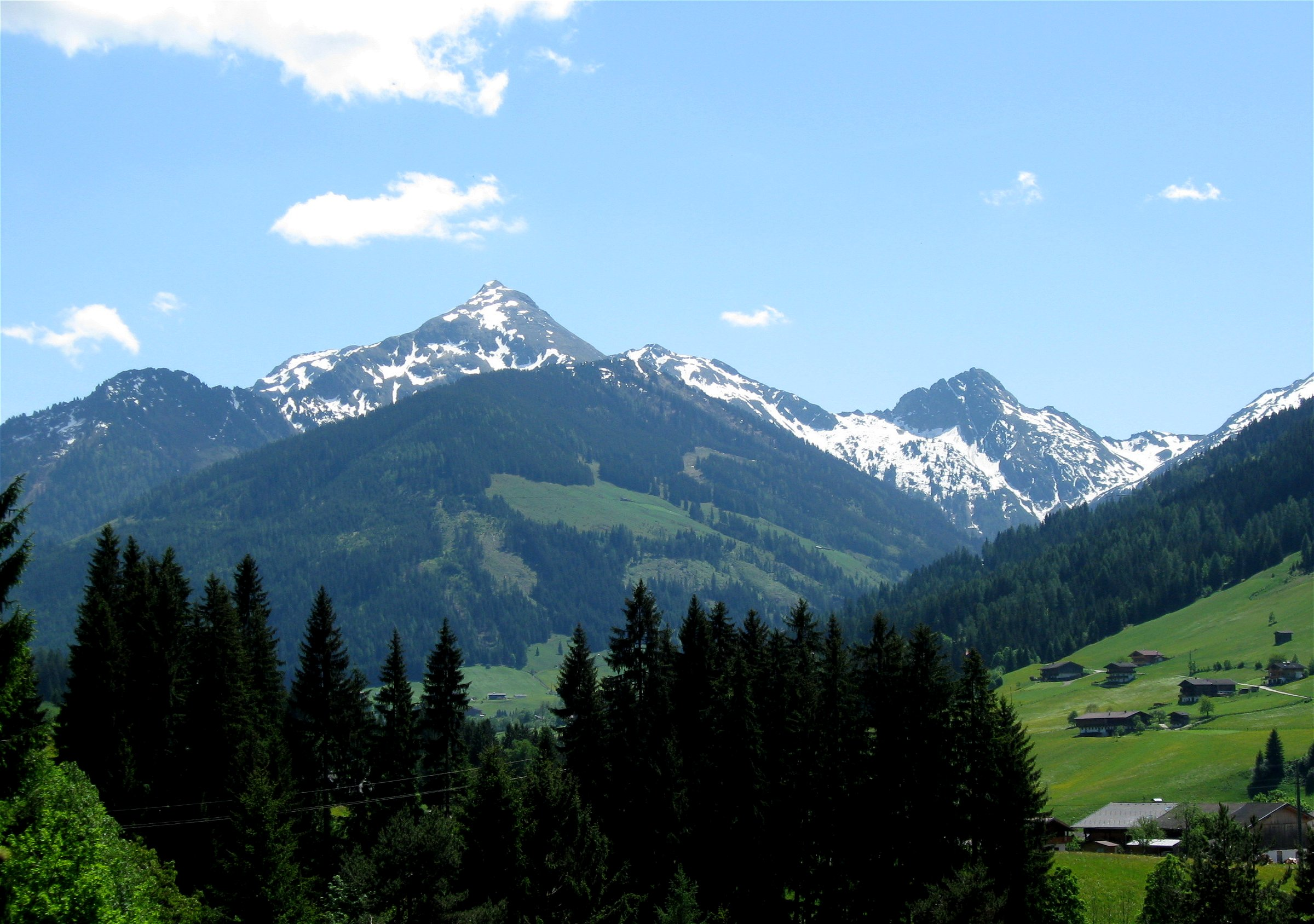
The Großer Galtenberg seen from Alpbach

== See also ==
- Tyrol Schistose Alps
