= Sankt Barbara im Mürztal =

- Municipality
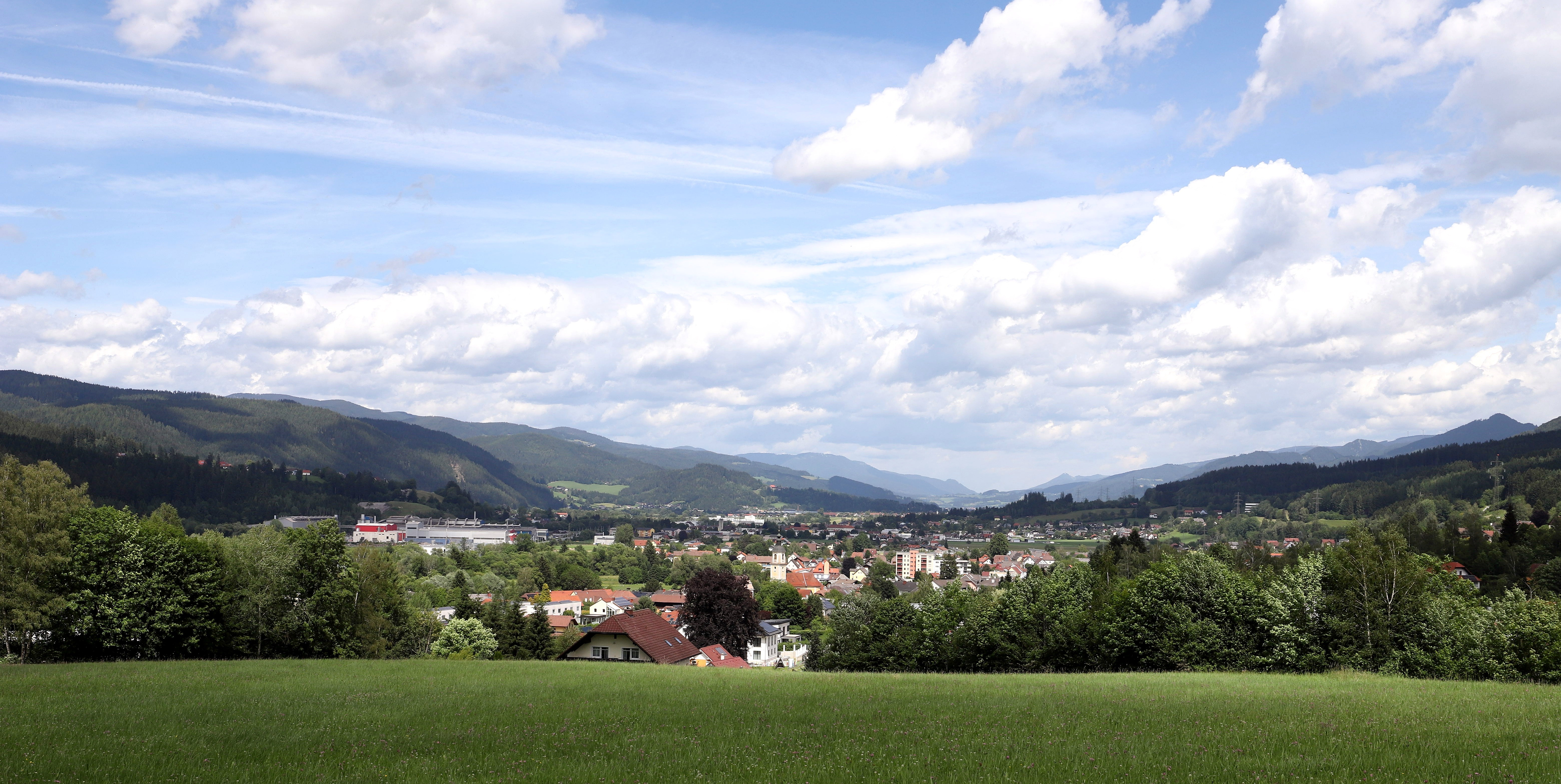
- Sankt Barbara im Mürztal

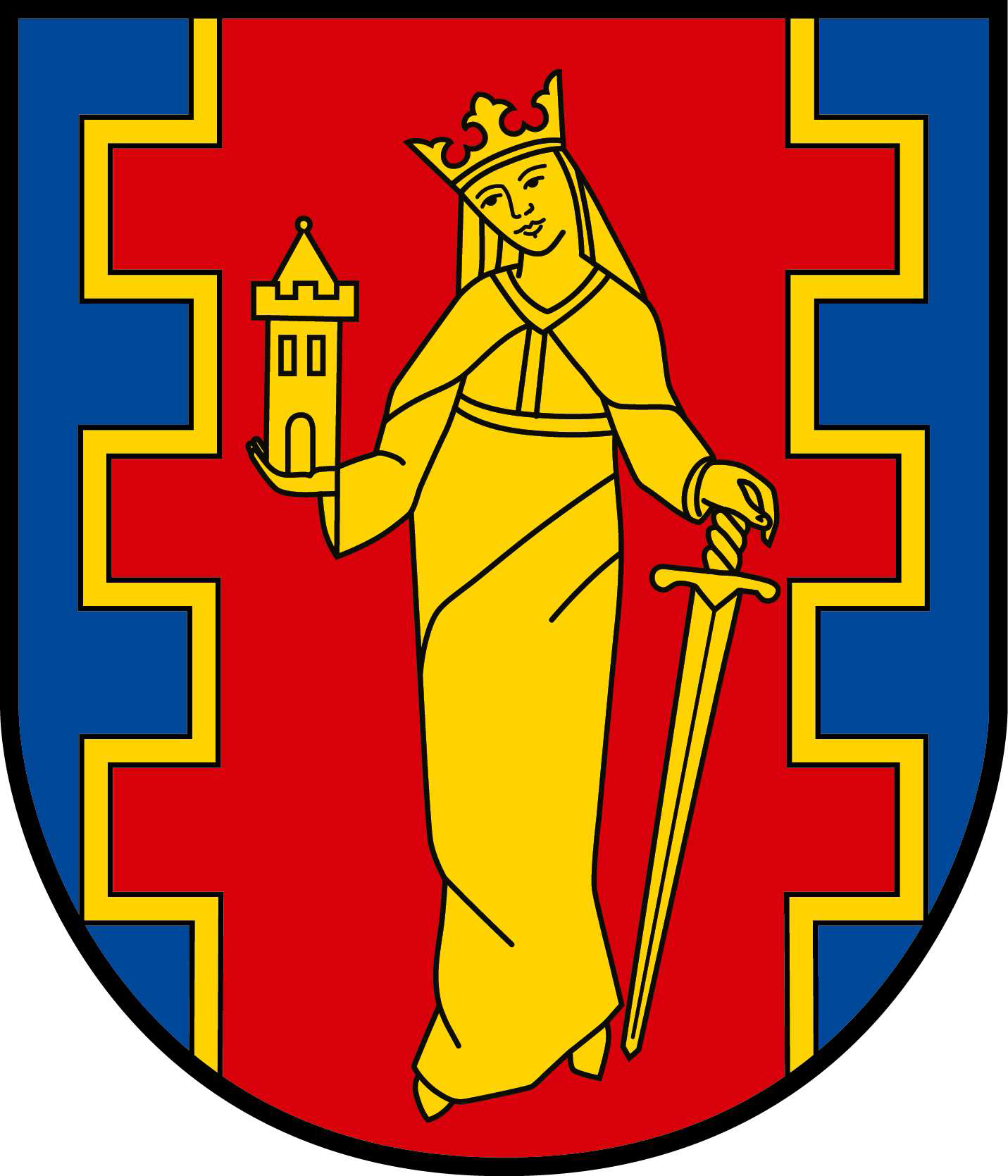
- Coat of arms

- Location within Austria
- Coordinates: 47°32′08″N 15°30′42″E
- Country: Austria
- State: Styria
- District: Bruck-Mürzzuschlag

Government
  - Mayor: Jochen Jance (SPÖ)

Area
  - Total: 112.6 km^{2} (43.5 sq mi)

Population (2018-01-01)
  - Total: 6,583
  - Density: 58.46/km^{2} (151.4/sq mi)
- Time zone: UTC+1 (CET)
  - Summer (DST): UTC+2 (CEST)
- Postal code: 8661, 8662, 8663, 8664
- Area code: 03856, 03858
- Website: st-barbara.gv.at

Sankt Barbara im Mürztal is since 2015 a market town in Styria, Austria, with 6,726 inhabitants (as of 1 January 2016) in the judicial district of Mürzzuschlag and in the political district of Bruck-Mürzzuschlag in Styria. As part of the municipality structural reform in Styria, the municipality, which was founded on 1 January 2015, was formed by the merger of the independent municipalities:

- Mitterdorf im Mürztal,
- Veitsch und
- Wartberg im Mürztal.

This was based on the Styrian municipality Structural Reform Act, StGsrG.

In this case, no major part of one of the (three) outlying communities was used as a new name, but only the district name "Mürztal" (Murtal). The new community is named after the patron saint of miners, St. Barbara. A church dedicated to St. Barbara was built in 1986 in what is now the district Mitterdorf.

== Geography ==
The highest elevation point in the municipality area is the mountain range Hohe Veitsch, with an altitude of 1,981 m (6,499 ft), which simultaneously forms a natural boundary to the west and north-west of the municipality. To the west is the Pretalsattel (1,069 m or 3,507 ft above sea level), which provides a connection to the Stübming valley, Turnau, and the Aflenz Basin.

In the east and southeast of the town borders the mountain range of Fischbacher Alpen.

== Municipality arrangement ==
The municipal area covers seven towns (in parentheses inhabitants as at 1 January 2016):

- Großveitsch (904)
- Kleinveitsch (415)
- Lutschaun (453)
- Mitterdorf im Mürztal (1,926)
- Niederaigen (643)
- Veitsch (374)
- Wartberg im Mürztal (2,012)

The community consists of the cadastrals (Katastralgemeinden): Großveitsch, Kleinveitsch, Lutschaun, Mitterdorf, Niederaigen, Scheibsgraben, Veitsch Dorf and Wartberg.

== Economy and sights ==
- Pilgerkreuz am Veitscher Ölberg: Starting from the Veitsch parish church, a forest trail leads to the Veitsch mount-of-olives pilgrims cross. The cross was built in 2004 and is 40.6 m (133 ft) high (up to 27 m height inside walkable), as the world's largest of its kind.
- Holzknecht-Ball: The Holzknecht Ball, held annually on the first Friday after January 6 (Epiphany), is organized by the Trachtenverein society D'Rauschkogler z'Veitsch. Besides the Oberlandler Ball in Graz or the Schützenball in Grundlsee, it is one of Styria's few remaining traditional costume balls with Auftanz (popular polonaise) performances. Among the traditional folk dances, the Veitscher Masur (referred to by the locals as "Veitscher Ochs gallop") is frequently practised by many visitors in the course of the evening.
- The Veitscher Grenzstaffellauf, one of Austria's toughest Alpine marathons, has been held annually since 1986 on the last Saturday in June. It leads over 54 km (34 mi) and 2,200 meters (7,200 ft) in height out of the indoor swimming pool along the municipal boundaries, across the high plateau of the Hohe Veitsch, and back to the starting point. Top runners take just 4:30 hours for this distance. The course can also be completed by a team of three (with sections of 16.5 / 16.0 / 21.5 km). Here the winners are just under 4:00 hours. In 2013, the Austrian mountain marathon championships were held there.
- Mürztaler Landtage: The largest, multi-day agricultural fair of the Mürz valley has been held at Wartberg in the Mürztal since 2009. In addition to equipment shows and trade exhibitions in the agricultural sector, attendees are offered a wide gamut of amusement facilities and concerts of different genres.

== Transportation ==
The town lies on the southern railway, has 2 train stations of ÖBB ("Mitterdorf - Veitsch" or "Wartberg im Mürztal") and is accessible on the Semmering Schnellstraße S 6 (road exit "Mitterdorf"). The town can also be reached via the L 102 (Veitscherstraße) from Turnau or via the L 118 (Semmering Begleitstraße) from Kindberg and Krieglach.

Since 2016-07-18, a bus of the Mürztaler transport company is run from Kapfenberg and interconnects all 3 districts:

Route 85 (Pretal-) Groß-Veitsch - (Dorf-Veitsch-) Niederaigen - Mitterdorf im Mürztal - Wartberg im Mürztal station.

== Industry ==
Mining (magnesite as from 1881), production of refractory products for smelting furnaces, steel production and processing have a long tradition and are still significant today in the area:

- RHI AG, including Veitscher Magnesitwerke - refractory materials
- Vogel & Noot AG – manufacturer of agricultural machinery and heating appliances
- Breitenfeld AG – high-grade steel works
- Bien-Zenker – prefabricated houses

== Education ==
- Secondary musical school "Musium" Mitterdorf
- Vocational college for forwarding merchants/logisticians

== Notable people ==
- Helmut Brenner (* 1957), international musicologist, historian and university lecturer
- Carl Gustav Heraeus (1671-1725), antiquarian at the imperial court in Vienna, entrepreneur, scholar and writer
- Karl Skala (1924-2006), poet
- Gunter Singer (* 1967), Austrian-American filmmaker, private military contractor, world champion kickboxer
