= Alpbachtal =

Coordinates: 47.396°N 11.910°E

The Alpbachtal is a valley in Tyrol, Austria. It is a side valley of the Inn valley.

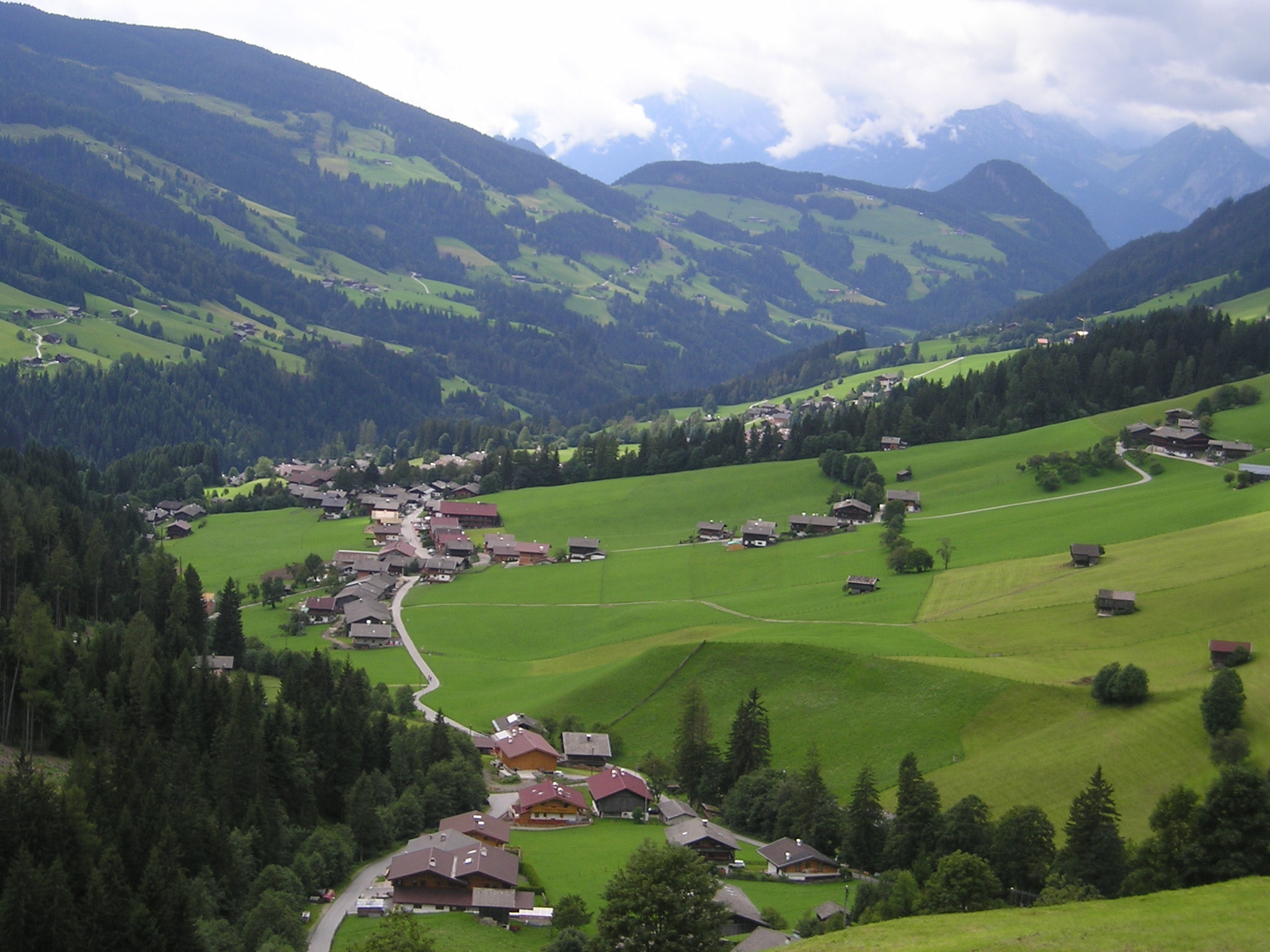
The Alpbachtal

The Alpbachtal takes its name from the Alpbach stream, which flows through the entire valley. The entrance to the valley is the municipality of Brixlegg. A road from Brixlegg runs through the valley to the parish of Inneralpbach. The neighbouring valleys are the Ziller valley and Wildschönau.

== Mountains ==
The highest mountains in the Alpbachtal are:

- Großer Galtenberg (2,425 m)
- Sonnenjoch (2,287 m)
- Standkopf (2,228 m)
- Wiedersberger Horn (2,128 m)
- Gratlspitze (1,899 m)
- Schatzberg (1,898 m)
- Loderstein (1,830 m)
- Reitherkogel (1,337 m)

== Tourism ==
The main source of income both in summer and in winter is tourism. There is a large ski area in the Alpbachtal on the south side of the Wiedersberger Horn with 2 gondola cableways and 15 ski lifts. A smaller ski area with one gondola cableway and 4 ski lifts is located at the entrance of the village of Reith im Alpbachtal. The other skiing areas are only served from the other valleys. In summer, the valley, which has several alpine meadows (alms), is a hiking area.

== Forum ==
The annual European Forum Alpbach, attended by politicians and academics, and others from around the world, takes place in Alpbach.

== Municipalities ==
The valley has 2 municipalities: Reith im Alpbachtal and Alpbach. The head of the valley is the village of Inneralpbach.

== Gallery ==
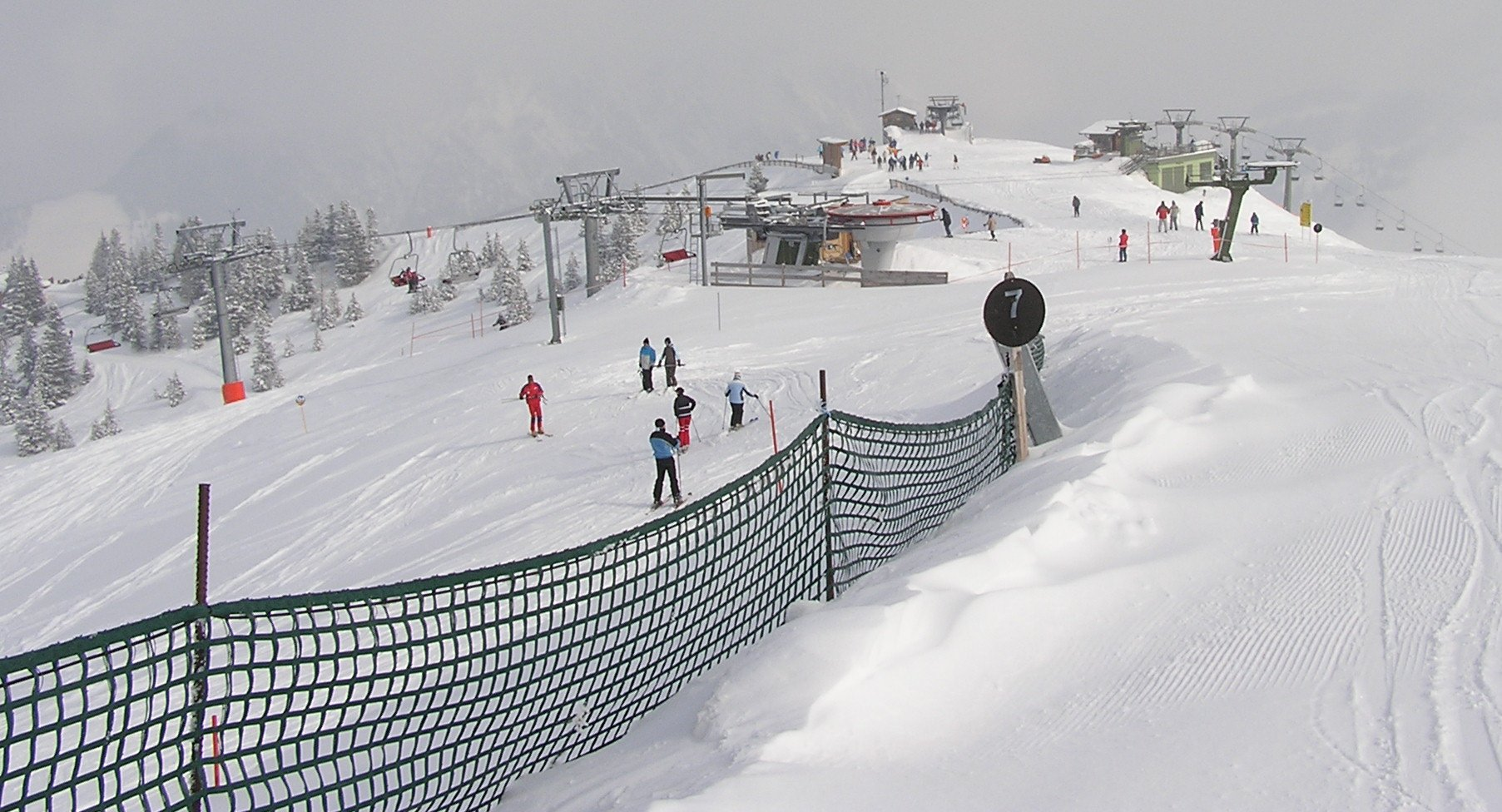
The Alpbachtal Ski Region, near the Gmahkopf
