= Sonnenjoch =

Mountain in the Kitzbühel Alps in Tyrol

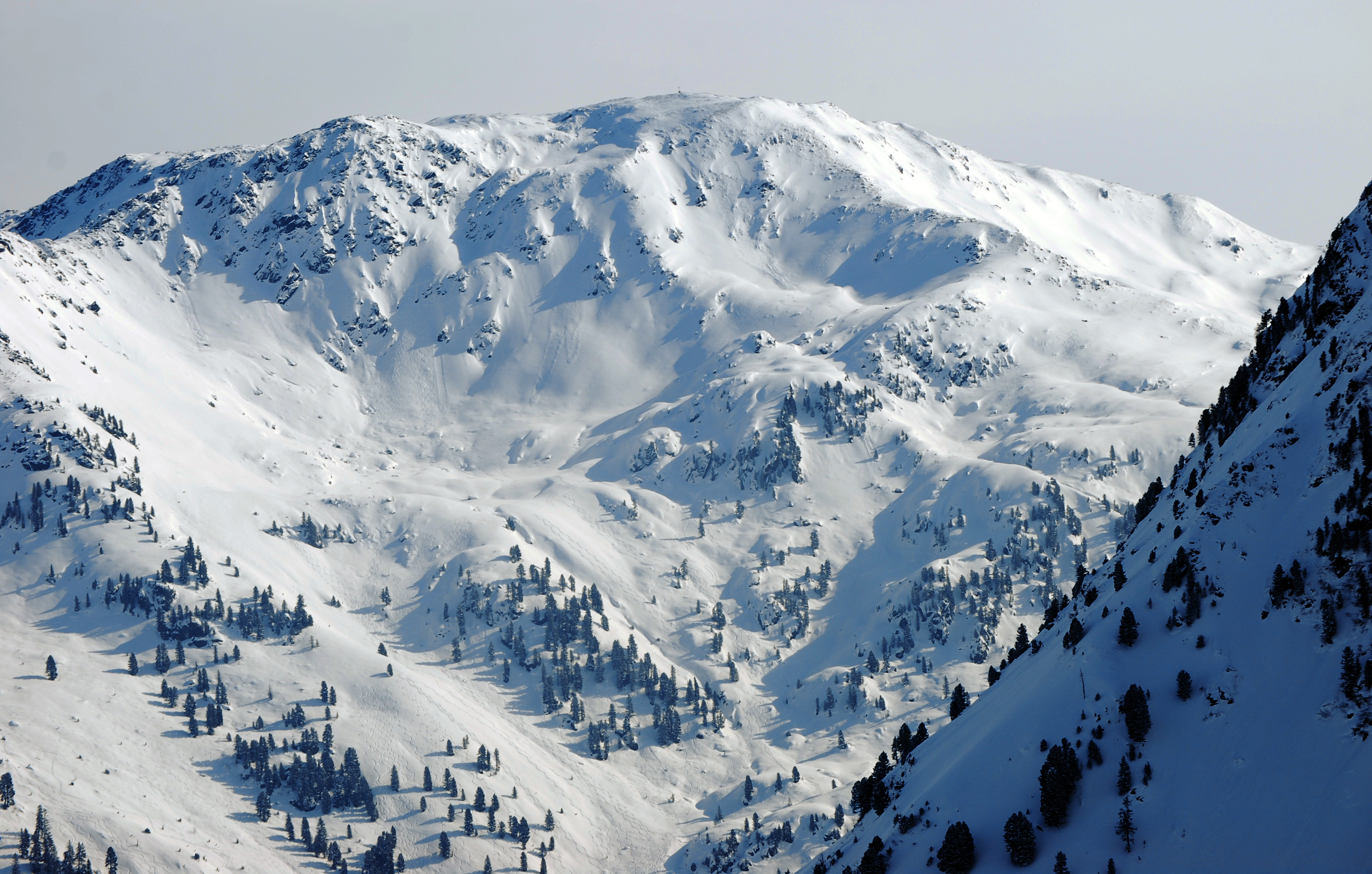

Highest point
- Elevation: 2,292 m (AA) (7,520 ft)
- Coordinates: 47°19′18″N 12°01′21″E

Geography
- Location within Austria
- Location: Tyrol, Austria
- Parent range: Kitzbühel Alps

The Sonnenjoch is a mountain in the Kitzbühel Alps in Tyrol, Austria. The summit has a height of 2,287 m (AA)

The Sonnenjoch (also Sonnjoch) lies between Alpbachtal, Wildschönau and Kelchsau. Its summit borders on three Tirolean districts (Kitzbühel, Kufstein, Schwaz) and five municipalities also meet here (Alpbach, Hart im Zillertal, Hopfgarten im Brixental, Stummerberg and Wildschönau).

The Sonnenjoch is, in contrast with its northern neighbour, the Großer Beil, less frequently climbed. The most popular climbing routes run from the Schönangeralm in the Wildschönau along the Kastensteig (waterfalls), on to Gressenalm and from there to the summit. In winter this mountains is a popular ski touring summit.
