= Kerschbaum Saddle =

Kerschbaum Saddle Kerschbaumer Sattel
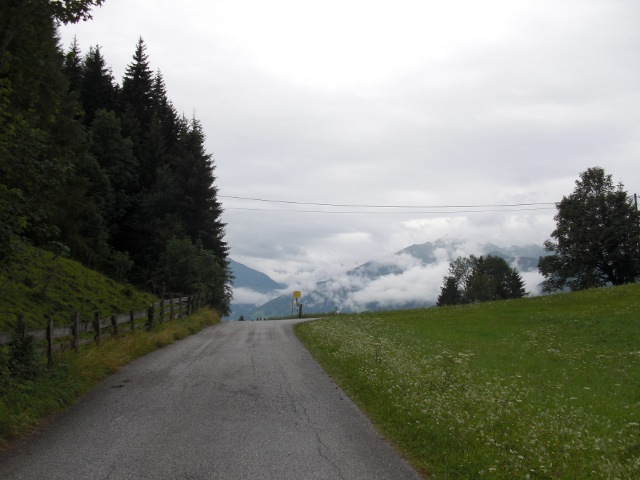
- Top of the pass

- Location within Alps
- Elevation: 1,111 m (3,645 ft)AT
- Traversed by: local road

Third Approach
- Location: Austria
- Range: Kitzbühel Alps
- Coordinates: 47.38754°N 11.87649°E

The Kerschbaum Saddle (German: Kerschbaumer Sattel) is a 1,111 m (AA) high mountain pass between Alpbachtal and Zillertal in the Austrian state of Tyrol.

== Location and area ==
The pass road runs from Reith im Alpbachtal (near the Inntal) over the top of the pass near Hart im Zillertal. The narrow, tarmac road is a local route; through traffic uses the B169 / B171 (and A12) through the Ziller and Inn valleys further to the west.

== See also ==
- List of highest paved roads in Europe
- List of mountain passes
