= Roßkopf (Kitzbühel Alps) =

- Location within Austria

Highest point
- Elevation: 1,731 m (AA) (5,679 ft)
- Coordinates: 47°25′31″N 12°04′10″E

Geography
- Location: Tyrol, Austria
- Parent range: Kitzbühel Alps

The Roßkopf is a mountain in the Austrian state of Tyrol in the Kitzbühel Alps. It is 1,731 metres (5,679 ft) high and lies about 7 kilometres due south of Wörgl. To the northeast an arête descends to the Marchbachjoch or Markbachjoch (1,496 m); another ridge runs northeast to the Kirchköpfl (1,487 m) and a third to the Turmkogel (1,648 m) to the south. The summit of the Roßkopf is the highest in the local area. It is marked by a large summit cross.

The summit may be climbed on a number of routes, most of which are designated as "easy", and is also a destination for snowshoe tours.

== Access ==
- By bus from Wörgl to Wildschönau.

== Ascents ==
- From Niederau in der Wildschönau:
  - On foot via the Marchbachjoch (1,496 m) and the Halsgatterl (1,562 m), easy, duration: 3 hrs, 50 min.
  - Via gondola lift to the Marchbachjoch; footpath over the Halsgatterl to the summit, easy, duration: 2 hours.
  - On foot via the Anton Graf Hut and Kircherköpfl, easy, duration: 3 hours.
- From Wildschönau Oberau:
  - On foot via the Roßkopf Hut, very steep, easy, duration: 2½ hours.
  - On foot to the Baumgartenhof and Baumgartenalm. Footpath to Anton Graf Hut or Norderberg snack bar (Way No. 23). Over the "Halsgatterl", fairly steep climb to summit.
