= Feldalphorn =

- Location within Austria

Highest point
- Elevation: 1,923 m (AA) (6,309 ft)
- Coordinates: 47°23′07″N 12°05′04″E

Geography
- Location: Wildschönau, Kelchsau, Tyrol, Austria
- Parent range: Kitzbühel Alps

The Feldalphorn, also known as the Feldalpenhorn, is a 1,923 m (AA) high mountain in the Kitzbühel Alps in Tyrol, Austria.

== Location and surroundings ==
The Feldalphorn is part of a mountain ridge that separates the Wildschönau in the west from the Kelchsau in the east. Its neighbouring summit to the south is the 1,980 m high Schwaiberghorn; to the north the ridge continues to the 1,648 m high Turmkogel. The tree line on the Feldalphorn lies at about 1,700 m, above which the mountain is characterised by alpine meadows or alms. Its slopes are relatively gentle.

== Paths to the summit ==
The Feldalpenhorn is a relatively easy hiking peak. The forest road runs up the Wildschönau side to the Unterer Prädastenalm 1,320 m. From there is a signed hiking trail from the northwest to the top. The summit may also be ascended along the arête from the Turmkogel and the crest from the Schwaiberghorn, both along signed footpaths, as well as from the Kelchsau to the east.

In addition the Feldalphorn is a popular ski touring mountain. The climb from the Wildschönau is comparatively safe from avalanches. From the valley of the Schwarzenau it is a roughly 1,000 metre climb that takes around 2.5 hours.
