= Karl Skala =

Austrian poet (1924–2006)

- Born: 3 February 1924; Wartberg im Mürztal, Styria, Austria
- Died: 31 December 2006 (aged 82); Graz, Styria, Austria
- Occupation: poet
- Writing career
- Period: 1943–2006

Karl Skala (3 February 1924 – 31 December 2006) was an Austrian poet.

He started to write in 1943, while in Russia during the war. He earned recognition with the poem "Ein guter Kamerad", which he had written for his fallen friend and comrade Hannes. His first book of poetry, Feierabend-Andacht, was published in 1956. It was followed by five more books. During his lifetime, Karl received many awards, including Das Goldene Ehrenzeichen für Verdienste um das Bundesland Steiermark. Many of his poems were put to music. He was often invited to other countries and traveled extensively.

== Selection of works ==
=== Volumes of poetry ===
- Feierabend-Andacht (After Work Devotions) (1956)
- ... und ringsum ist Heimat (... and All Around is Home) (1957)
- Wie 's holt so geht (As it Goes) (1966)
- Gefährte Mensch und Zeitgenoss' (Companion Man and Contemporary) (1968)
- Unterwegs durch Zeit und Leben (On the Way Through Time and Life) (1976)
- Späte Ernte (Late Harvest) (1989)

== Sources ==
- Elias, Christa-Maria, ed. (2001). ... ein bisschen mehr Friede. BoD. pp. 189–190. ISBN 3-8311-1944-9. (online, p. 189, at Google Books)
