= Auffach =

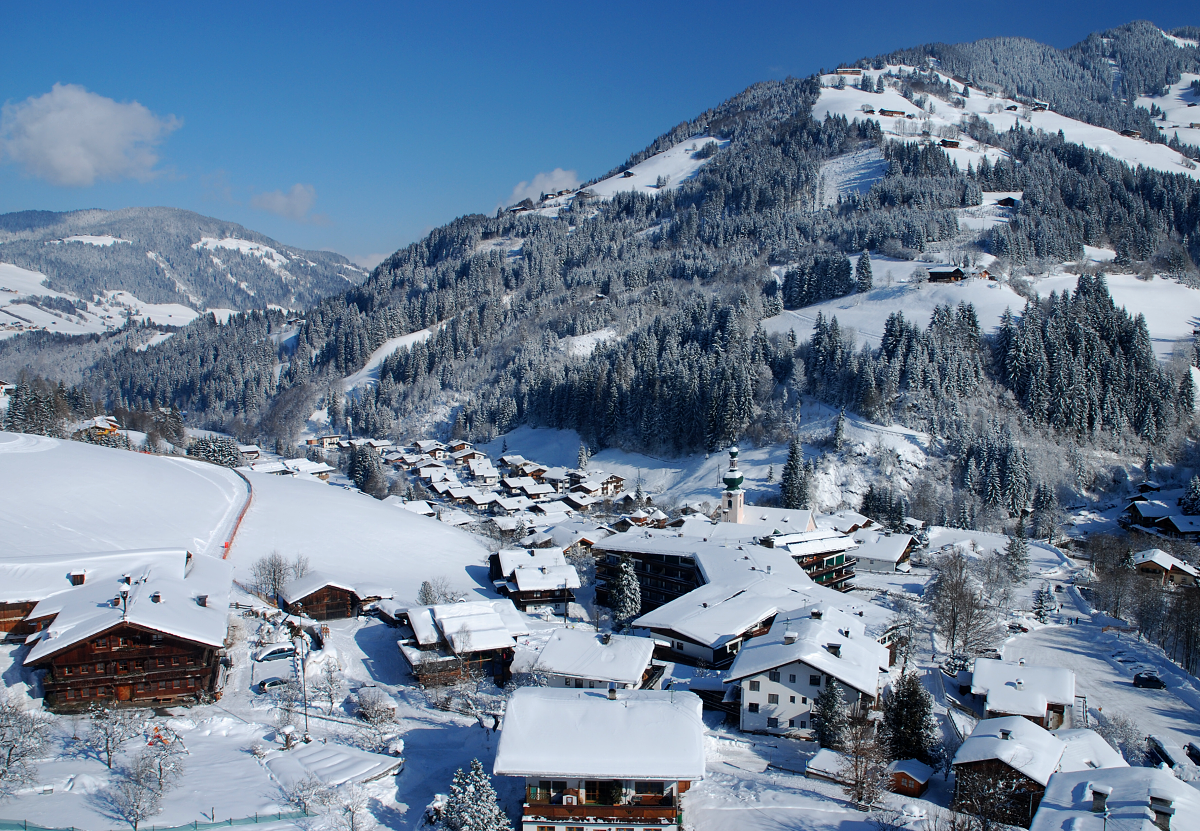
- Interactive map of Auffach
- Coordinates: 47°24′38″N 12°02′09″E
- Country: Austria
- State: Tyrol
- District: Kufstein
- Elevation: 869 m (2,851 ft)

Population
  - Urban: 927
- per 2023-01-01
- Time zone: UTC+1 (CET)
  - Summer (DST): UTC+2 (CEST)
- Postal code: 6313
- Area code: +43 5339
- Vehicle registration: KU

Auffach is a village and Katastralgemeinde in Wildschönau municipality within Kufstein District in the state of Tyrol, Austria.

== Features ==
The main economic factors are tourism (all seasons) and agriculture.

The cable car Schatzberg-Gondelbahn starts in the city center and operates in both summer and winter seasons
