= Veitsch =

- Former municipality
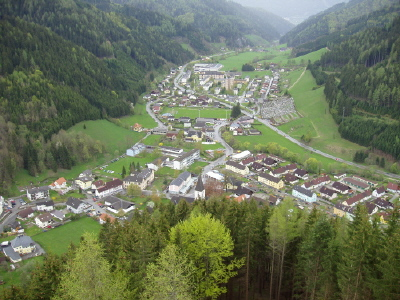
- View of Veitsch

- Coat of arms

- Location within Austria
- Coordinates: 47°34′46″N 15°29′34″E
- Country: Austria
- State: Styria
- District: Bruck-Mürzzuschlag

Area
  - Total: 77.71 km^{2} (30.00 sq mi)
- Elevation: 664 m (2,178 ft)

Population (1 January 2016)
  - Total: 2,417
  - Density: 31.10/km^{2} (80.56/sq mi)
- Time zone: UTC+1 (CET)
  - Summer (DST): UTC+2 (CEST)
- Postal code: 8663, 8664
- Vehicle registration: MZ
- Website: www.veitsch.at

Veitsch is a former municipality in the district of Bruck-Mürzzuschlag in Styria, Austria. Since the 2015 Styria municipal structural reform, it is part of the municipality Sankt Barbara im Mürztal.

Starting from the local church in Veitsch, a forest trail leads up the mountain to the Veitsch Pilgrims Cross on the Mount of Olives. The cross was built in 2004 and it is the largest of its kind in the world.
