= Mitterdorf im Mürztal =

- Former municipality
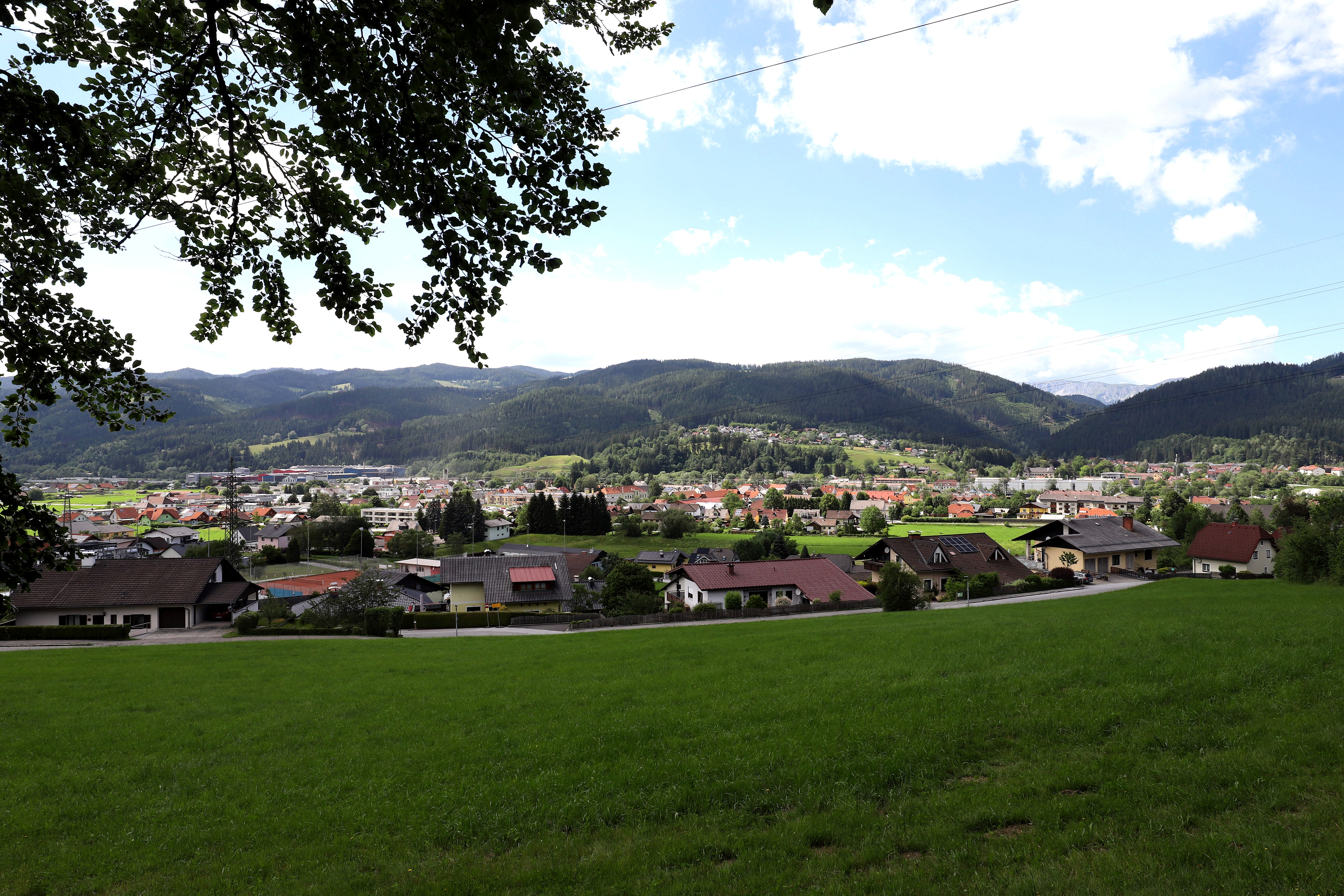
- View of Am Berg (part of Mitterdorf)

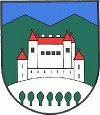
- Coat of arms

- Location within Austria
- Coordinates: 47°32′08″N 15°30′42″E
- Country: Austria
- State: Styria
- District: Bruck-Mürzzuschlag

Area
  - Total: 11.12 km^{2} (4.29 sq mi)
- Elevation: 568 m (1,864 ft)

Population (1 January 2016)
  - Total: 2,378
  - Density: 213.8/km^{2} (553.9/sq mi)
- Time zone: UTC+1 (CET)
  - Summer (DST): UTC+2 (CEST)
- Postal code: 8662
- Area code: 03858
- Vehicle registration: MZ
- Website: www.mitterdorf.at

Mitterdorf im Mürztal is a former municipality in the district of Bruck-Mürzzuschlag in the Austrian state of Styria. Since the 2015 Styria municipal structural reform, it is part of the municipality Sankt Barbara im Mürztal.

== Geography ==
Mitterdorf lies in the valley of the Mürz about 13 km southwest of Mürzzuschlag. To the south are the Fischbach Alps.
