= 2019 Combined Slovenian Championships =

Competition climbing event

- Location: Celje, Slovenia
- Dates: 14 – 16 June 2019

Champions
- Men: Jernej Kruder
- Women: Janja Garnbret

The 2019 Combined Slovenian Championships were the first Slovenian national championships for competition climbing in combined format. It was held in Celje, Slovenia from 14 to 16 June 2019. The athletes competed in speed, bouldering, and lead disciplines, and the combined results of those disciplines would determine the winners. The winner for men was Jernej Kruder and for women was Janja Garnbret.

== Competition format ==
It was held based on and to simulate the latest Olympic combined format.

Athletes were ranked based on their scores in separate disciplines. Points were calculated by multiplying the ranks of each athlete in the three disciplines.

== Men ==
The final round started with speed race, which in the final race Jernej Kruder false started, giving an easy win for Žiga Zajc. Next in the bouldering, Kruder made amends by topping all three boulder problems in five attempts, just one attempt less than the second place, Anže Peharc. Lastly in the lead, Domen Škofic leading the way, though not topping the route, and Kruder placed second which ultimately made him the winner of the competition. Škofic took second place, and Peharc third.

Final Rank	Name	Final Points	Lead			Boulder		Speed	
Final Rank	Name	Final Points	Rank	Score	Time	Rank	Score	Rank	Time
1	Jernej Kruder	4	2	28,1 +	2 : 18	1	3T3z 5 5	2	999 : 99
2	Domen Škofic	28	1	37	4 : 10	4	2T3z 6 13	7	10 : 46
3	Anže Peharc	40	4	28	2 : 40	2	3T3z 6 4	5	999 : 99
4	Žiga Zajc	56	8	26 +	2 : 42	7	1T3z 2 14	1	1 : 01
5	Matic Kotar	75	5	28	2 : 53	5	2T3z 7 8	3	8 : 03
6	Luka Potočar	96	3	28 +	3 : 24	8	1T2z 1 4	4	8 : 61
7	Zan Sudar	126	7	26,1 +	2 : 37	3	3T3z 11 7	6	13 : 62
8	Klemen Novak	288	6	27 +	3 : 14	6	2T3z 9 9	8	999 : 99

== Women ==
The finals started with speed discipline, where Urška Repušič won after Janja Garnbret false started in the final race. Next in the bouldering, Vita Lukan led the way by topping all three boulder problems in just four attempts, where the second place Lučka Rakovec needed one more and the third place Janja Garnbret needed two more attempts. Coming to the last climbs in lead, the competition was very tight as there were three people with combined points of 6 and one with 7 so far. Two people topped the route, and the faster one, Garnbret, became the winner, and Rakovec took second place. In the end, after multiplying the ranks of each event, Garnbret became the women's champion of combined nationals, Rakovec closely behind in second place, and Lukan completing the podium in third place.

Final Rank	Name	Final Points	Lead			Boulder		Speed	
Final Rank	Name	Final Points	Rank	Score	Time	Rank	Score	Rank	Time
1	Janja Garnbret	6	1	Top	3 : 06	3	3T3z 6 4	2	999 : 99
2	Lučka Rakovec	12	2	Top	3 : 59	2	3T3z 5 5	3	9 : 96
3	Vita Lukan	35	5	40	3 : 24	1	3T3z 4 4	7	17 : 89
4	Urška Repušič	42	7	30	3 : 46	6	2T3z 4 6	1	1 : 01
5	Mia Krampl	72	3	41 +	4 : 03	4	2T3z 2 4	6	12 : 07
6	Mina Markovič	160	4	41 +	4 : 53	5	2T3z 3 4	8	18 : 66
7	Lucija Tarkuš	210	6	30 +	3 : 54	7	1T3z 4 9	5	13 : 32
8	Julija Kruder	256	8	26 +	2 : 40	8	0T3z 0 4	4	12 : 14
