= Gaflenz =

- Municipality
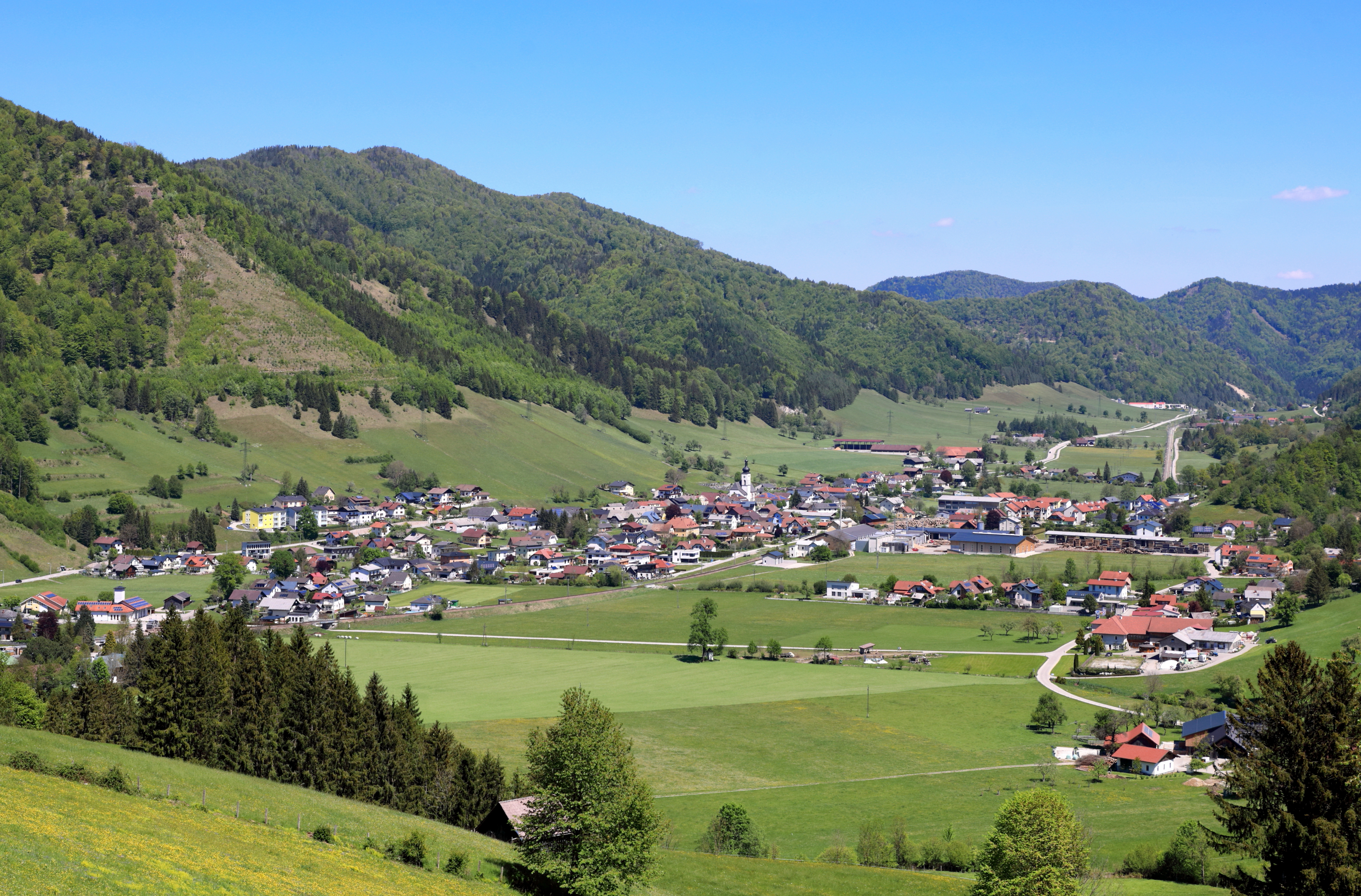
- Southwest view of Gaflenz

- Coat of arms

- Location within Austria
- Coordinates: 47°53′49″N 14°43′32″E
- Country: Austria
- State: Upper Austria
- District: Steyr-Land

Government
  - Mayor: Guenther Kellnreitner (ÖVP)

Area
  - Total: 58.78 km^{2} (22.70 sq mi)
- Elevation: 482 m (1,581 ft)

Population (2018-01-01)
  - Total: 1,954
  - Density: 33.24/km^{2} (86.10/sq mi)
- Time zone: UTC+1 (CET)
  - Summer (DST): UTC+2 (CEST)
- Postal code: 3334
- Area code: 07353
- Vehicle registration: SE
- Website: www.gaflenz.at

Gaflenz is a market town in the Steyr-Land district of the Austrian state of Upper Austria. It is known for its saws and its gothic-style St. Andreas Parish Church, established in 1494.

== Population ==
Historical population
Year	Pop.	±%
1869	1,301	—
1880	1,399	+7.5%
1890	1,359	−2.9%
1900	1,427	+5.0%
1910	1,433	+0.4%
1923	1,553	+8.4%
1934	1,504	−3.2%
1939	1,491	−0.9%
1951	1,528	+2.5%
1961	1,520	−0.5%
1971	1,587	+4.4%
1981	1,659	+4.5%
1991	1,677	+1.1%
2001	1,797	+7.2%
2011	1,856	+3.3%

== International partnerships ==
Gaflenz is twinned with:

- Käerjeng, Luxembourg
