= Veitsch Mount of Olives Pilgrims Cross =

Coordinates: 47°34′58″N 15°29′24″E

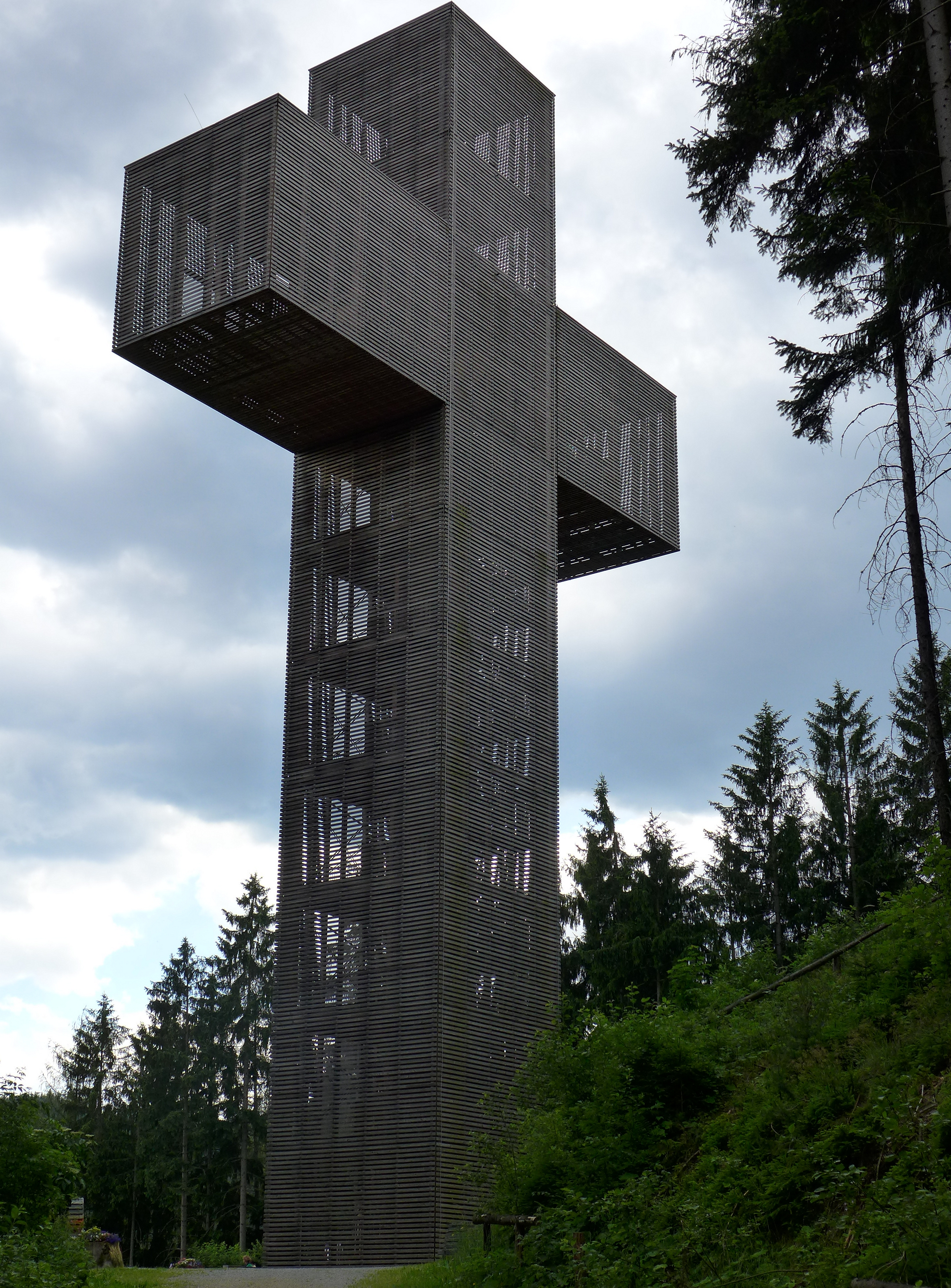
The pilgrims cross

Veitsch Mount of Olives Pilgrims Cross, (German: Pilgerkreuz am Veitscher Ölberg) is the world's largest pilgrims cross. It is situated near Veitsch in Austria. The cross was built in 2004; it is made of wood and is 40.6 m (133 ft) tall, with crossarms spanning 32.20 m (105.6 ft).

The cross is accessible for visitors.

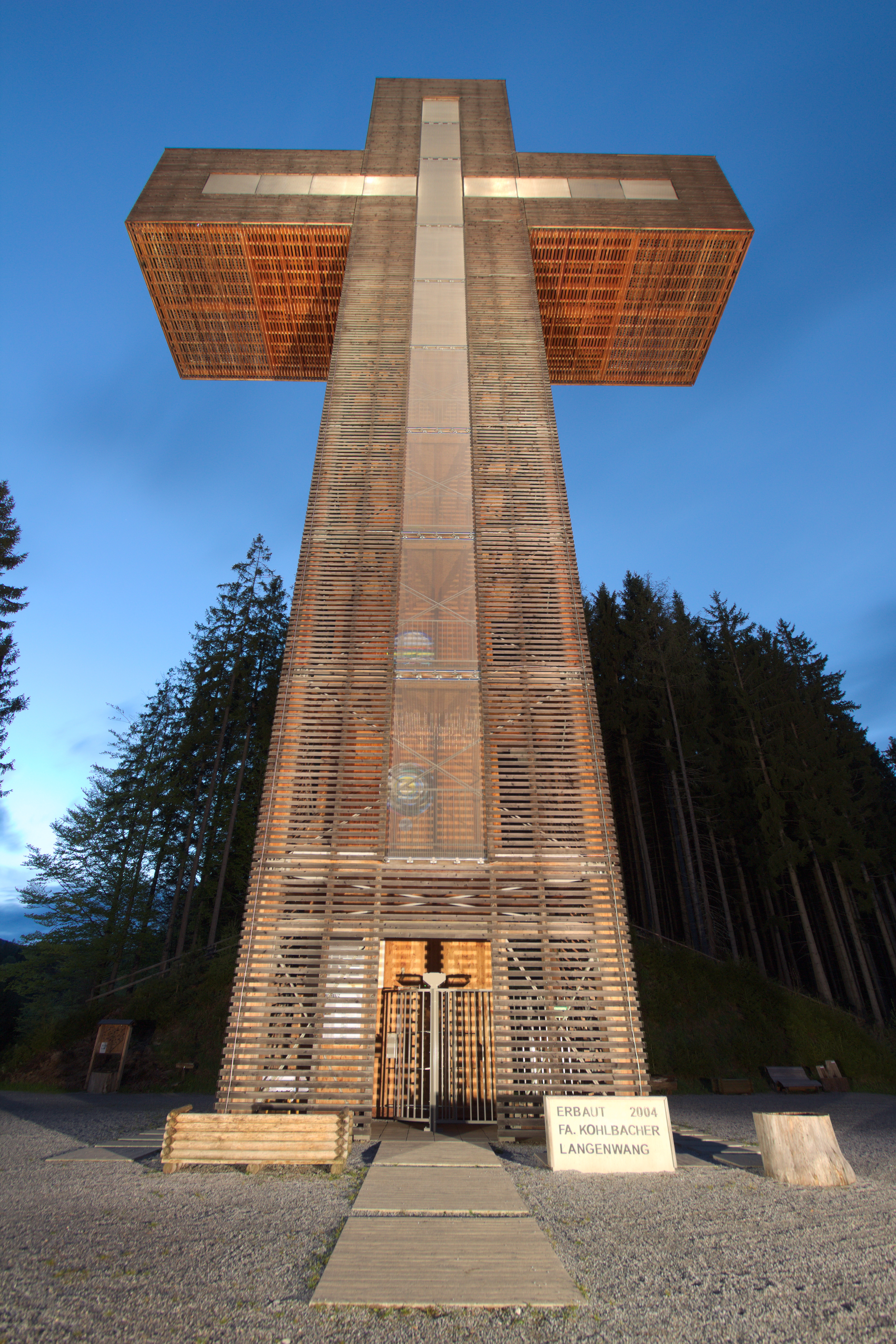
Night View

== See also ==
- List of towers
