= Großraming =

- Municipality
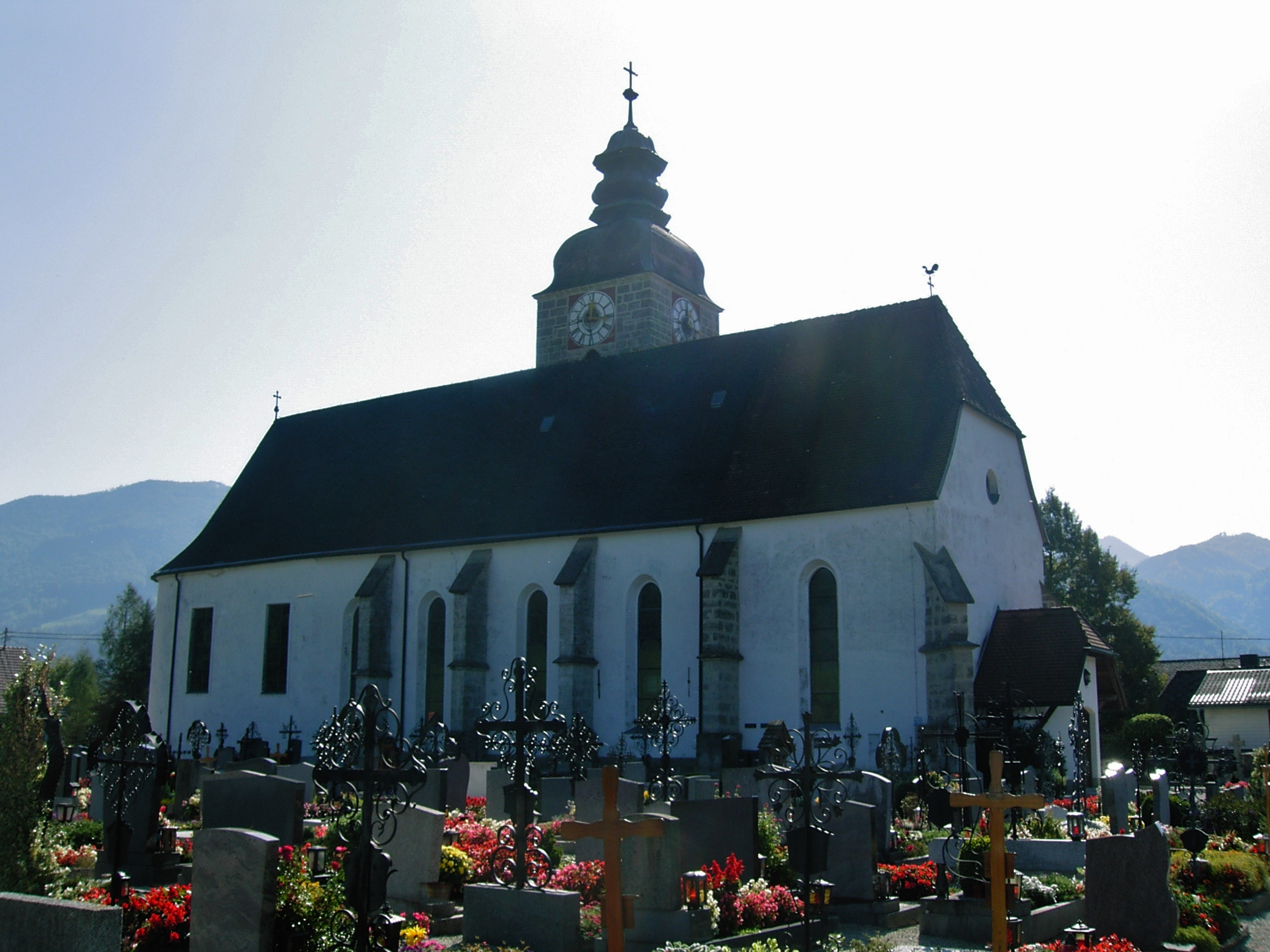

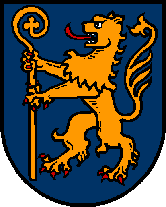
- Coat of arms

- Location within Austria
- Coordinates: 47°53′16″N 14°33′01″E
- Country: Austria
- State: Upper Austria
- District: Steyr-Land

Government
  - Mayor: Günther Großauer (ÖVP)

Area
  - Total: 107.69 km^{2} (41.58 sq mi)
- Elevation: 446 m (1,463 ft)

Population (2018-01-01)
  - Total: 2,702
  - Density: 25.09/km^{2} (64.98/sq mi)
- Time zone: UTC+1 (CET)
  - Summer (DST): UTC+2 (CEST)
- Postal code: 4463
- Area code: 07254
- Vehicle registration: SE
- Website: www.grossraming.at

Großraming is a municipality in the district of Steyr-Land in the Austrian state of Upper Austria.

== Geography ==
Großraming lies in the Traunviertel. The Enns river flows through the municipality. About 71 percent of the municipality is forest, and 23 percent is farmland.
