= Wartberg im Mürztal =

- Former municipality
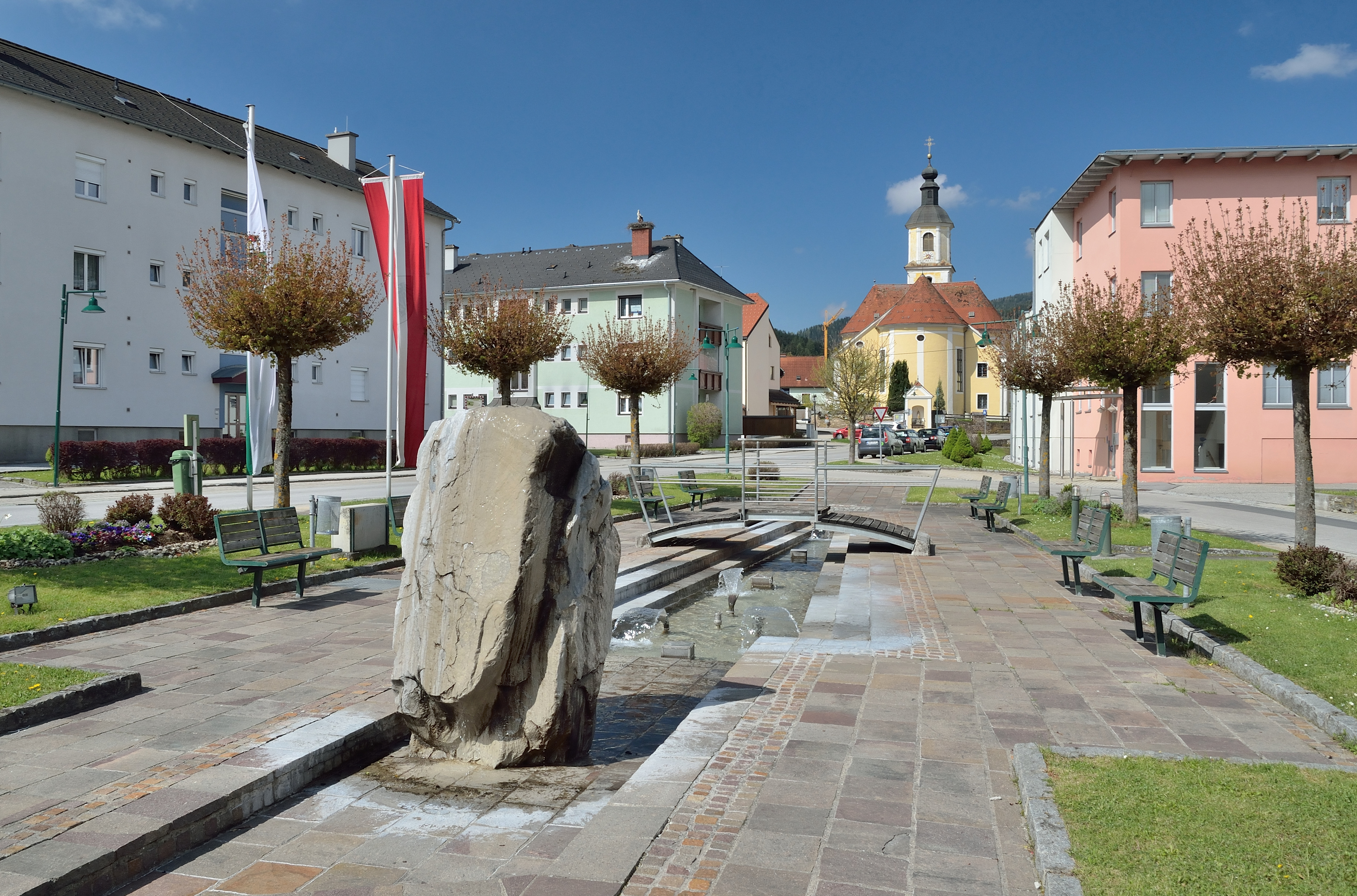

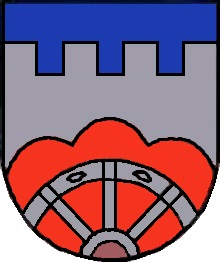
- Coat of arms

- Location within Austria
- Coordinates: 47°31′32″N 15°29′32″E
- Country: Austria
- State: Styria
- District: Bruck-Mürzzuschlag

Area
  - Total: 23.68 km^{2} (9.14 sq mi)
- Elevation: 584 m (1,916 ft)

Population (1 January 2016)
  - Total: 2,039
  - Density: 86.11/km^{2} (223.0/sq mi)
- Time zone: UTC+1 (CET)
  - Summer (DST): UTC+2 (CEST)
- Postal code: 8661
- Area code: 03858
- Vehicle registration: MZ
- Website: www.wartberg-muerztal.at

Wartberg im Mürztal is a former municipality in the district of Bruck-Mürzzuschlag in Styria, Austria. Since the 2015 Styria municipal structural reform, it is part of the municipality Sankt Barbara im Mürztal.
