= Georg Parma =

Austrian rock climber (born 1997)

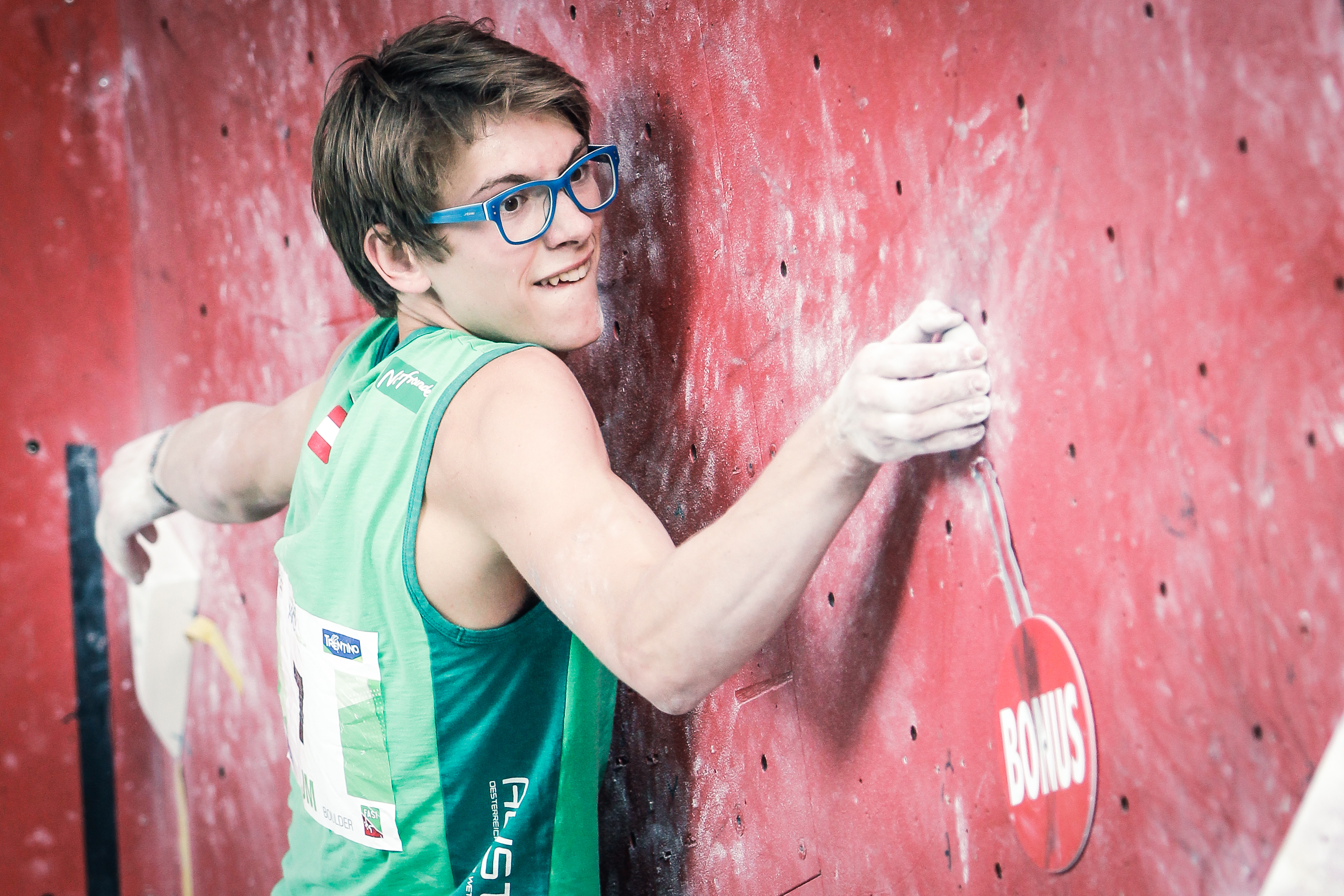

Personal information
- Born: April 15, 1997 (age 29) Eichgraben, Austria
- Height: 183 cm (6 ft 0 in) (2018)
- Weight: 67 kg (148 lb) (2018)
- Website: www.georgparma.org

Climbing career
- Type of climber: Competition climbing; Sport climbing; Bouldering
Medal record
World Youth Championships
| Bronze medal – third place | 2012 Singapore | Lead |
| Bronze medal – third place | 2014 Nouméa | Lead |
European Youth Championships
| Gold medal – first place | 2012 Gémozac | Lead |
| Gold medal – first place | 2014 Edinburgh | Lead |
| Gold medal – first place | 2016 Mitterdorf | Combined |
| Bronze medal – third place | 2016 Mitterdorf | Lead |
European Youth Cup
| Third place | 2012 | Lead |
| Winner | 2014 | Lead |
| Winner | 2015 | Lead |
| Second place | 2016 | Boulder |
| Third place | 2016 | Lead |
- Updated on 12 May 2016

Georg Parma (born 15 April 1997) is an Austrian competition climber. He competes in competition lead climbing, competition bouldering and competition speed climbing competitions. He currently lives in Graz where he prepares for the 2020 Summer Olympics.

== Biography ==
Georg Parma started climbing at the age of 5.

In 2012 he won the European Youth Championships in Singapore (lead climbing, Youth B) and placed third in the World Youth Championships held in Gémozac. 2014 he repeated those results (lead climbing, this time Youth A) at the European Youth Championships in Edinburgh and at the World youth Championships in Nouméa, in lead Youth A. In 2014 and 2015 he won the European Youth Cup in lead climbing.

Since 2014 (at the age of 17) he has participated in Climbing World Cup competitions.

He won the Austrian National Championships in lead climbing 2015 and in bouldering in 2018.

== Ranking ==
=== World Youth Championships ===
| | Youth B | Youth A | | Juniors |
| | 2012 | 2013 | 2014 | 2015 |
|---|---|---|---|---|
| Load | 3 | 7 | 3 | 10 |
| Boulder | - | - | - | 15 |

=== European Youth Championships ===
| | Youth B | Youth A | | Juniors |
| | 2012 | 2013 | 2014 | 2015 |
|---|---|---|---|---|
| Lead | 1 | 5 | 1 | 6 |
| Boulder | - | 10 | 4 | 18 |

=== European Youth Cup ===
| | Youth B | | Youth A | | Juniors | |
| | 2011 | 2012 | 2013 | 2014 | 2015 | 2016 |
|---|---|---|---|---|---|---|
| Lead | 11 | 3 | 8 | 1 | 1 | 3 |
| Boulder | - | 4 | 15 | 13 | 9 | 1 |
