= 2019 Combined Austrian Championships =

Competition climbing championships

- Location: Innsbruck, Austria
- Dates: 13 – 16 June 2019

Champions
- Men: Jakob Schubert
- Women: Jessica Pilz

The 2019 Combined Austrian Championships were the first Austrian national championships for competition climbing in combined format. It was held in Innsbruck, Austria from 13 to 16 June 2019, together with the Austrian Championships for speed, bouldering and lead disciplines. In this competition, the athletes competed in three disciplines (speed, bouldering, and lead) in combined format. The winner for men was Jakob Schubert and for women was Jessica Pilz.

== Competition format ==
It was held based on and to simulate the latest Olympic combined format.

Athletes were ranked based on their scores in separate disciplines. Points were calculated by multiplying the ranks of each athlete in the three disciplines.

== Men ==
The final round of combined nationals started with speed discipline, where Matthias Erber took the lead. Next in bouldering, Jakob Schubert climbed strongly to top all three boulder problems in five attempts, two attempts less than the second place Elias Weiler. Last in lead, Schubert topped the route, the only one to do so. Schubert won the competition with just 3 points (3x1x1), far ahead the second place Nicolai Uznik's 48 points (4x3x4).

Final Rank	Name	Final Points	Speed				Boulder					Lead		
Final Rank	Name	Final Points	Rank	Times			Rank	T	z	Ta	za	Rank	Score	Time
1	Jakob Schubert	3	3	7.76	7.02	10.75	1	3	3	5	3	1	Top	3.31
2	Nicolai Uznik	48	4	8.50	7.96	fall	3	2	3	2	4	4	37+	3.44
3	Matthias Erber	56	1	7.16	6.82	7.02	8	1	3	1	5	7	33+	2.25
4	Andreas Aufschnaiter	64	2	10.01	7.27	10.57	4	2	3	4	7	8	30	2.58
5	Alfons Dornauer	80	8	13.27	fall	13.17	5	2	3	5	7	2	41.5+	2.24
6	Elias Weiler	84	7	14.14	10.53	10.57	2	3	3	7	7	6	34+	3.12
7	Florian Klingler	108	6	9.83	10.42	8.50	6	1	3	1	3	3	39+	3.39
8	Jan-Luca Posch	175	5	8.39	9.43	8.42	7	1	3	1	3	5	36+	2.59

== Women ==
The finals started with speed race, where Sandra Lettner claimed top place. Next in bouldering, Jessica Pilz took the first place by topping all three boulder problems in six attempts, three attempts less than Lettner. Last in lead, Pilz continued to show her climbing prowess and became the only one to top the route. After multiplying the ranks of the three disciplines, Pilz won with 3 points (3x1x1), while Lettner took the second place with 10 points (1x2x5).

Final Rank	Name	Final Points	Speed				Boulder					Lead		
Final Rank	Name	Final Points	Rank	Times			Rank	T	z	Ta	za	Rank	Score	Time
1	Jessica Pilz	3	3	9.71	10.48	9.40	1	3	3	6	5	1	Top	
2	Sandra Lettner	10	1	10.02	9.62	10.15	2	3	3	9	6	5	44+	3.02
3	Julia Lotz	48	4	18.26	9.85	9.95	3	2	3	4	3	4	46+	
4	Celina Schoibl	60	6	10.44	13.33	10.15	5	1	3	1	4	2	47+	3.01
5	Laura Stöckler	84	2	10.30	9.46	10.53	7	1	2	1	3	6	44+	3.34
6	Eva Maria Hammelmüller	90	5	11.51	10.34	9.98	6	1	3	4	9	3	47+	4.08
7	Mattea Pötzi	196	7	13.64	12.93	23.18	4	2	2	5	4	7	43+	
8	Jana Rauth	512	8	0.00	0.00	0.00	8	x	x	x	x	8	x	
