= Wiedersberger Horn =

Mountain in Austria

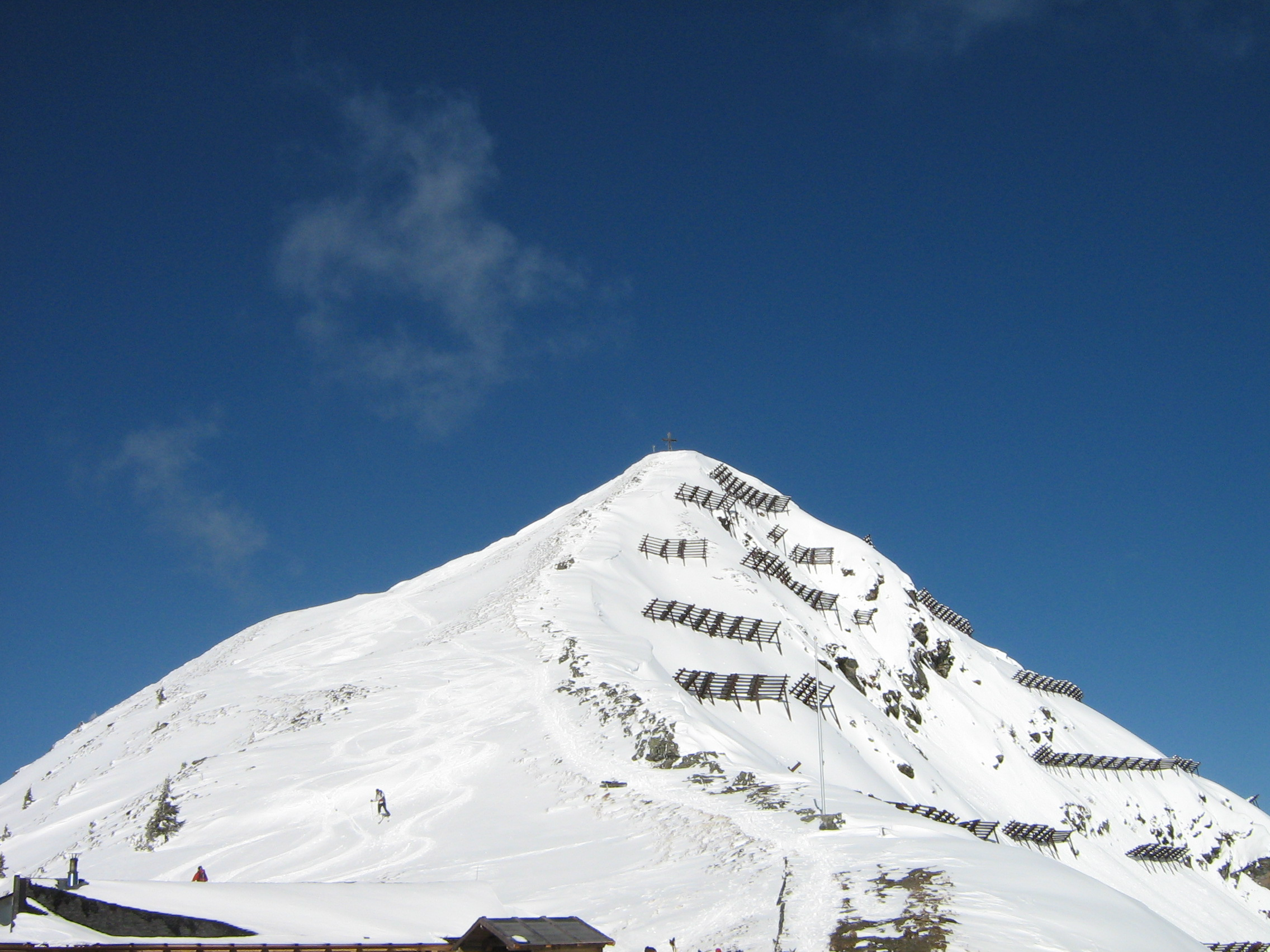
- The Wiedersberger Horn from the top station of the highest lift

Highest point
- Elevation: 2,127 m (AA) (6,978 ft)
- Coordinates: 47°21′39″N 11°55′21″E

Geography
- Location within Austria
- Location: Tyrol, Austria
- Parent range: Kitzbühel Alps

The Wiedersberger Horn is a mountain in the Alpbachtal valley in Austria. Its summit is 2,127 m (AA). The Wiedersberger Horn is accessible from the Alpbachtal via cableways and the mountainsides are used as a skiing area. In winter it may be climbed without difficulty in safe snow conditions. From the top station of the highest lift in the ski area (2,025 m) there is a path to the summit facilitated by step-like wooden beams.

On the wooden summit cross is a plaque with the inscription:

Dem Herrgott und der Heimat in treuer Einigkeit im Ottober des Heiligen Jahres 1933 errichtet. Katholischer Burschenverein Reith.
("Erected to the Lord God and our country in faithful unity in October of the year of our Lord 1933. Catholic Fellowship of Reith.")
