= Wildschönau =

- Municipality
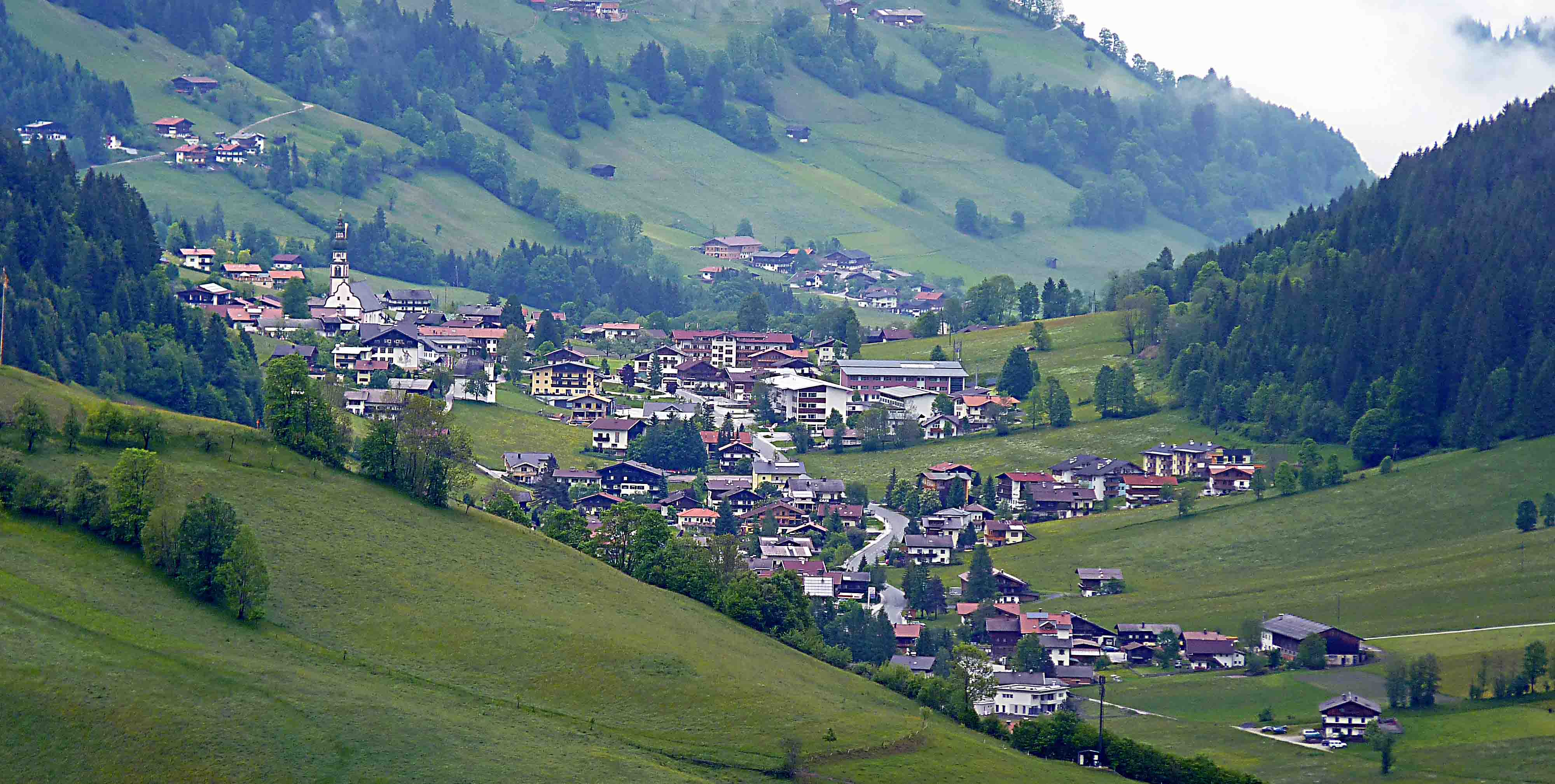
- Oberau, Wildschönau

- Coat of arms

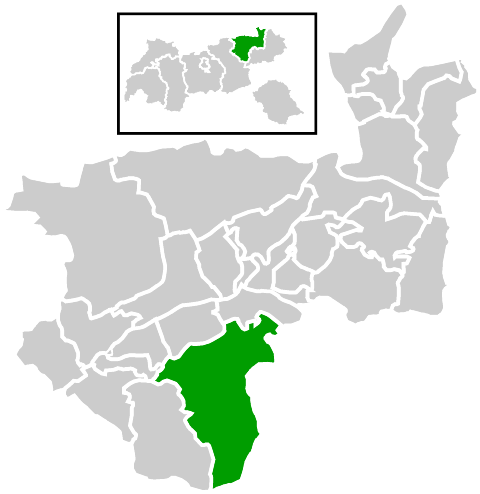
- Location within Kufstein district

- Location within Austria
- Coordinates: 47°27′00″N 12°03′00″E
- Country: Austria
- State: Tyrol
- District: Kufstein

Government
  - Mayor: Hannes Eder (ÖVP)

Area
  - Total: 97.42 km^{2} (37.61 sq mi)
- Elevation: 938 m (3,077 ft)

Population (2018-01-01)
  - Total: 4,242
  - Density: 43.54/km^{2} (112.8/sq mi)
- Time zone: UTC+1 (CET)
  - Summer (DST): UTC+2 (CEST)
- Postal code: 6311, 6313, 6314
- Area code: +43 5339
- Vehicle registration: KU

Wildschönau is a municipality within the district of Kufstein in the Austrian federal state of Tyrol 6 km south of Wörgl.

The 24 km long high valley near Wörgl is one of the district's tourist centers. Besides a few hamlets, the municipality consists of the four church villages Niederau, Oberau, Auffach and Thierbach and is situated in the Kitzbühel Alps. The municipal office is located in Oberau.

Besides two tourist seasons, the intense highland agriculture plays an economic role. A lot of inhabitants commute to their place of work in other municipalities. The municipality Wildschönau is based on "gentle" tourism and emphasizes not being a ski circuit like the nearby Kitzbühel. Several older T-bar lifts in the skiing region of Schatzberg (Auffach) were replaced with two chair lifts. A lift connection with the Alpbach valley was built in Summer 2012.

For a long time, mining took place.

== Neighbouring municipalities ==
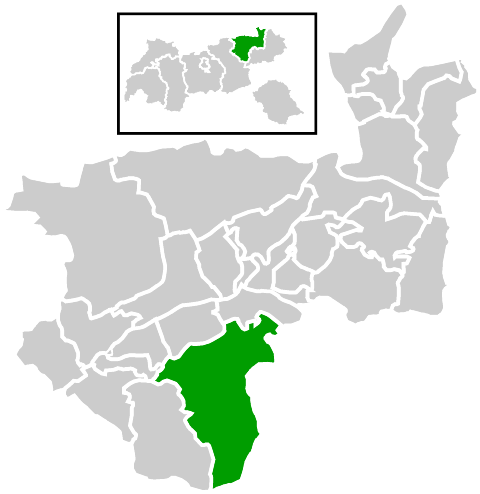
Position within Tyrol

Alpbach, Brixlegg, Hopfgarten im Brixental, Kundl, Wörgl.

== Boundaries ==
The western border of the valley is formed by the following mountains (listed from north to south): Gratlspitz, Schatzberg, Joelspitze, Lämpersberg, Kleiner Beil, Großer Beil (the highest mountain in the valley), and Sonnjoch. In the east there are the: Roßkopf, Feldalphorn, Schwaiberghorn, Breiteggern, and Breiteggspitze (listed from north to south). In the north, the valley is separated from the Inntal by a much lower mountain chain, which is cleft by the Kundler Klamm, above which is the Kragenjoch. At the end of the valley is a rather flat pass, the Schafsiedeljoch.

== History ==
The first mention of Wildschönau dates back to 1193–95, when the Bavarian count Henry of Lechsgemünd-Rettenberg transferred some of his people to the Herrenchiemsee cloister. Among the testimonies of the deed issued in that circumstance was the ministerialis «Adelbertus de Wiltsconenŏwe» (Albert of Wildschönau).

== Coat of arms ==
Legend has it that the high valley was originally covered by a lake, with a dragon living on its shores. A farmer killed the dragon and during its death struggle, it smashed the rocks which retained the lake. The water poured down through the resulting flume, the so-called Kundler Klamm, towards the Inn valley and the high valley was released. The coat of arms depicts the legendary dragon, while cleaving the rock.
