= Reith im Alpbachtal =

- Municipality
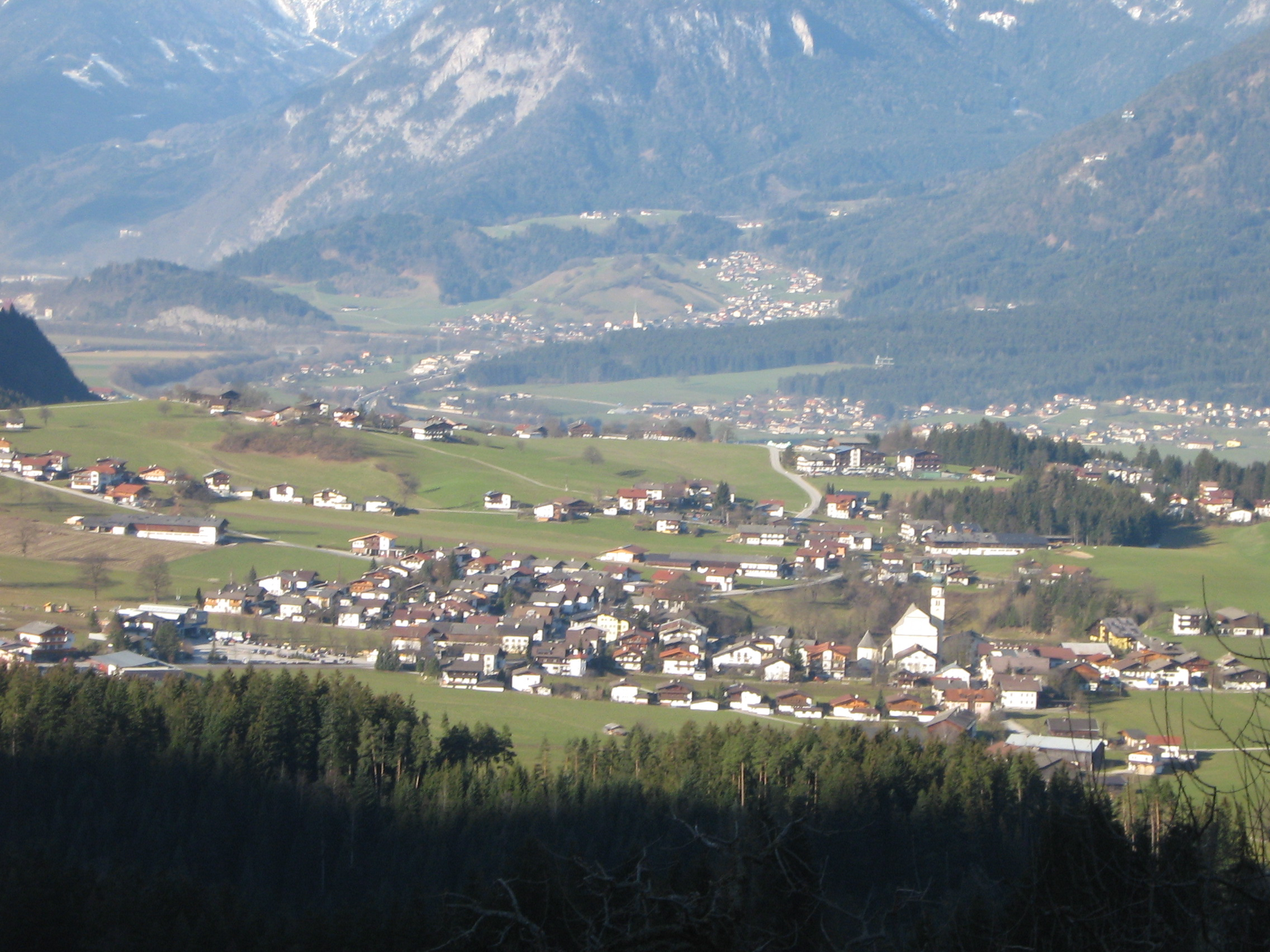

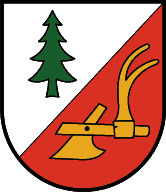
- Coat of arms

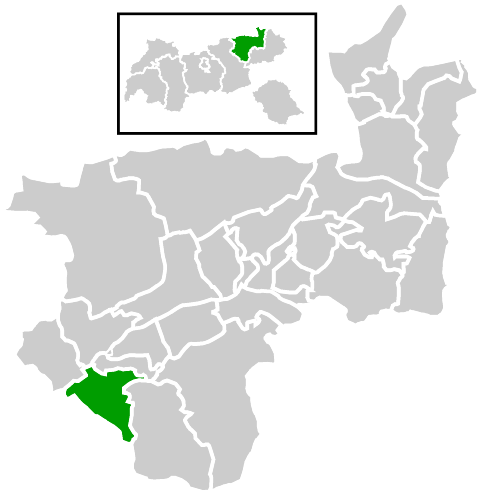
- Location within Kufstein district

- Location within Austria
- Coordinates: 47°25′00″N 11°52′42″E
- Country: Austria
- State: Tyrol
- District: Kufstein

Government
  - Mayor: Johann Thaler

Area
  - Total: 27.41 km^{2} (10.58 sq mi)
- Elevation: 637 m (2,090 ft)

Population (2018-01-01)
  - Total: 2,722
  - Density: 99.31/km^{2} (257.2/sq mi)
- Time zone: UTC+1 (CET)
  - Summer (DST): UTC+2 (CEST)
- Postal code: 6235
- Area code: 05337
- Vehicle registration: KU
- Website: www.reithimalpbachtal.tirol.gv.at

Reith im Alpbachtal is a municipality in the Kufstein district in the state of Tyrol located in the Alpbachtal valley, 32.9 km southwest of Kufstein, 19.6 km west of Wörgl, and 44.1 km east of Innsbruck, the main capital of Tyrol.

The village is a very old settlement which was mentioned for the first time in documents around 976. From the 15th to 19th century silver and copper were mined. The main sources of income nowadays are agriculture and tourism.
