= Alpbach =

Town in Tyrol, Austria

- Municipality
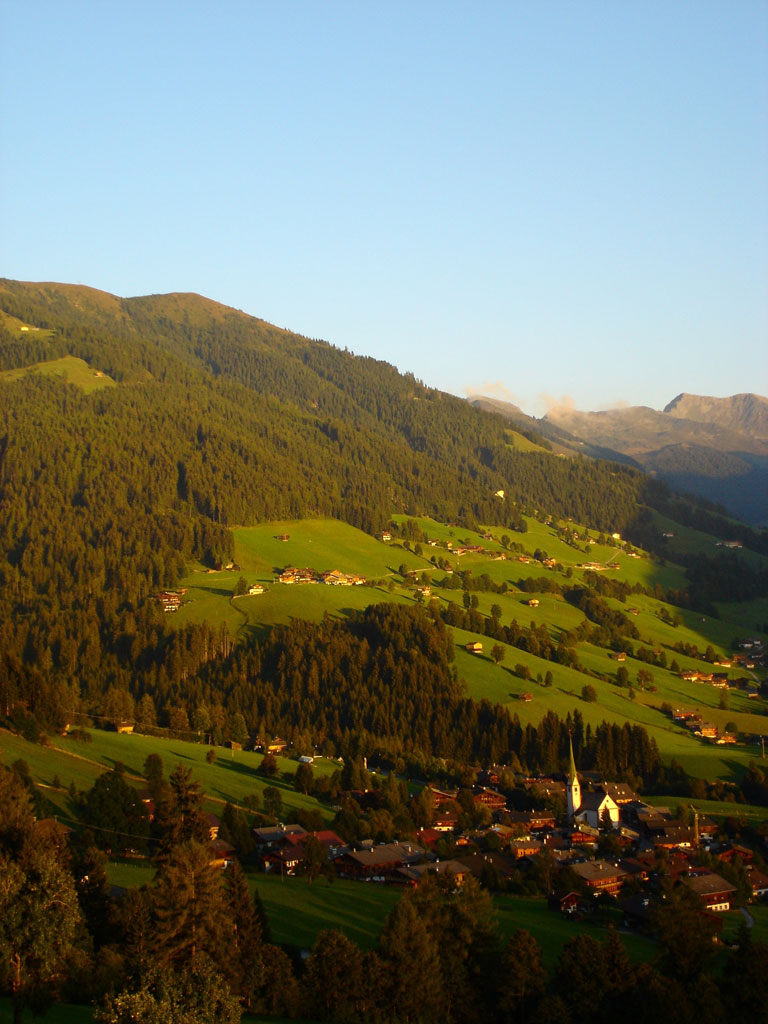

- Coat of arms

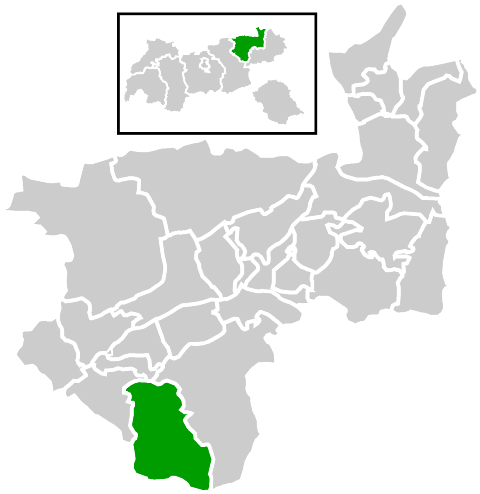
- Location within Kufstein district

- Location within Austria
- Coordinates: 47°23′54.72″N 11°56′38.06″E
- Country: Austria
- State: Tyrol
- District: Kufstein

Government
  - Mayor: Markus Bischofer

Area
  - Total: 58.37 km^{2} (22.54 sq mi)
- Elevation: 975 m (3,199 ft)

Population (2021)
  - Total: 2,538
  - Density: 43.48/km^{2} (112.6/sq mi)
- Time zone: UTC+1 (CET)
  - Summer (DST): UTC+2 (CEST)
- Postal code: 6236
- Area code: 05336
- Vehicle registration: KU
- Website: www.alpbach.tirol.gv.at

Alpbach (German: [ˈalpax], locally [ˈɔɪ̯b̥ɔx]) is an Alpine village and municipality in the Kufstein district of Tyrol, western Austria. Situated in the Kitzbühel Alps, it had a population of 2,510 as of 1 January 2026.

== History ==
The earliest written record of the name Alpbach comes from 1150, although human settlement is known to have begun there before and around the year 1000, and a bronze axe found at Steinberger Joch (the pass leading to the Ziller Valley) in 1860 suggests that the route was already in use in the Hallstatt period.

Christianity was first brought to the region in the 7th and 8th centuries by Irish and Scottish monks, and the patron saint of the parish church is in fact St. Oswald, a former King of Northumbria.

At the beginning of the 15th century, deposits of copper and silver were discovered on the Gratlspitz and Schatzberg and in the Luegergraben. At the time, the Fugger merchant family from Augsburg had control over mining operations in Schwaz and Kitzbühel, and they extended their activities to include the Alpbach valley. The Böglerhof housed the Fugger offices and was also seat of the Mining Court. In those days, Alpbach already had two inns, the Böglerhof and the Jakober Inn, where the men of the village would go to drink spirits, such as schnapps. By the middle of the 19th century, productivity at the mines had declined to the stage where they had to be closed.

Vorder-Unterberg Farm, which was built in 1636–1638 by local carpenters and was used as a farmhouse until 1952, stands at the edge of the forest above the little church in Inneralpbach. Today the building is a mountain farming museum, and the exhibits include the old parlour, chapel, a combined kitchen and smokehouse, and over 800 artefacts of daily life and work.

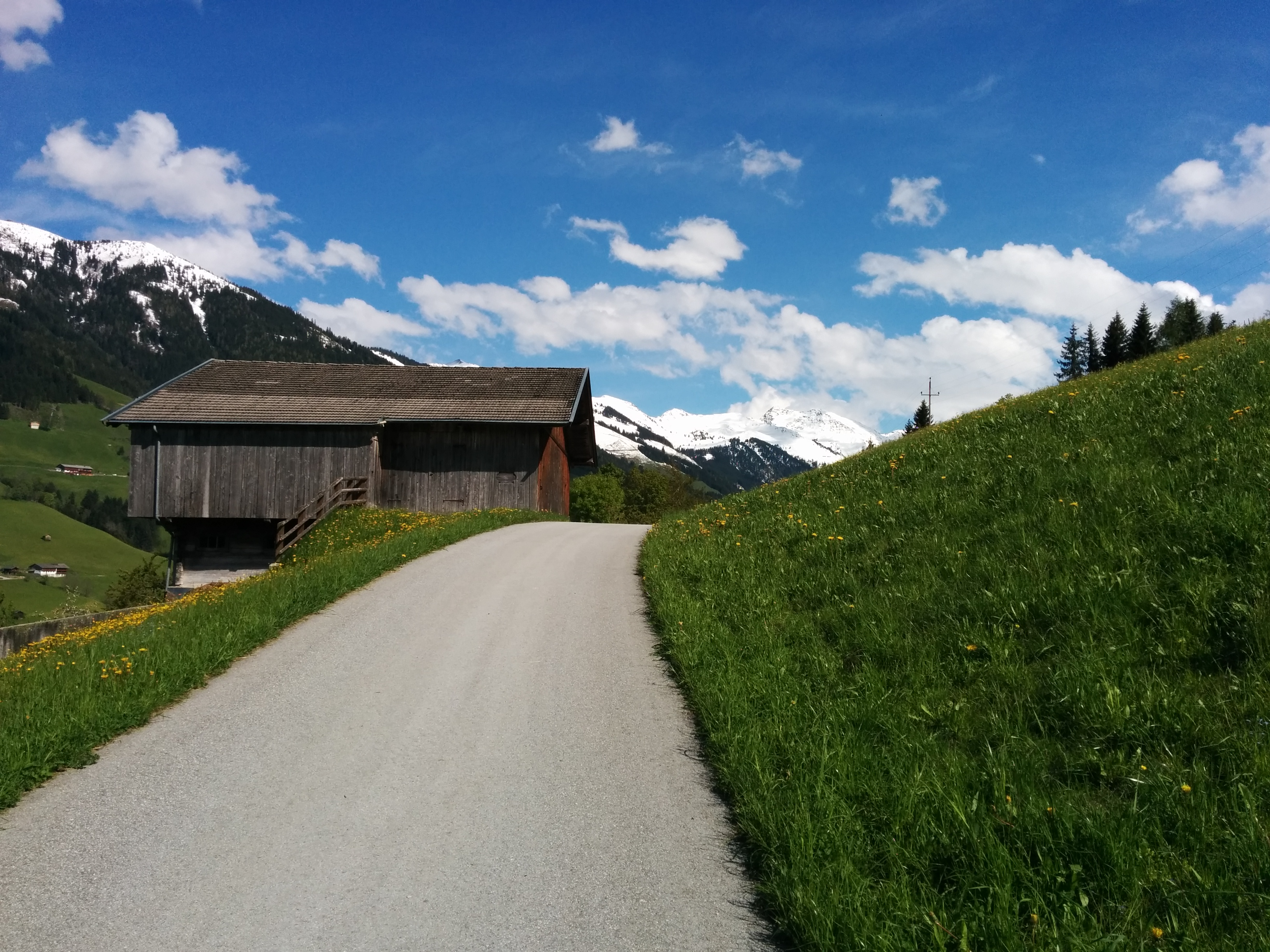
Typical barn in Alpbach

The road leading up the valley to Alpbach was not built until 1926, and the isolated location of the village led to the development of a distinctive style of architecture and furnishings, and also enabled the local folk traditions to be preserved for much longer than in most of the valleys of the Tyrol.

== Culture and sights ==
=== Architecture ===
In 1953, Alpbach's municipal council introduced local building regulations at the suggestion of Alfons Moser, who served as mayor of Alpbach from 1945 to 1979. The regulations required new buildings to adhere to the village's traditional Alpine architectural style.

This style is characterised by the predominant use of timber in residential and agricultural buildings. Under the regulations, ground floors may be constructed from masonry, while upper floors must be clad in wood. The regulations also specify requirements for roof pitch, roofing materials, building height, window width and balconies. Together, these requirements have contributed to the relatively consistent architectural appearance of Alpbach.

=== Awards and distinctions ===
Over the years, Alpbach has collected many awards and distinctions. In 1975, the Austrian Public Health Institute certified that Alpbach had the cleanest and purest air in all of Austria. It was voted "Austria's Most Beautiful Village" in 1983 by a television contest organised by Austrian Television. In June 1985, the Council of Europe in Strasbourg conferred upon Alpbach the right to fly the European flag in recognition of the community's services to European Unity. In 1993, Alpbach won "The Most Beautiful Floral Village in Europe" award.

=== European Forum Alpbach ===
Since 1945, Alpbach has been the venue for the Alpbach European Forum, an annual two-week conference of leading figures from the worlds of science, business, the arts and politics. The Forum and the participation of so many people who have shaped the thinking of their times has given Alpbach the nickname, "The Village Of Thinkers."

The first conference hall in Alpbach was built in the mid-1950s and named after the Austrian poet Paula von Preradovic, who wrote the words for the Austrian national anthem. The plenary hall was named after the physicist and Nobel Prize winner Erwin Schrödinger. He lies buried in the Alpbach cemetery.

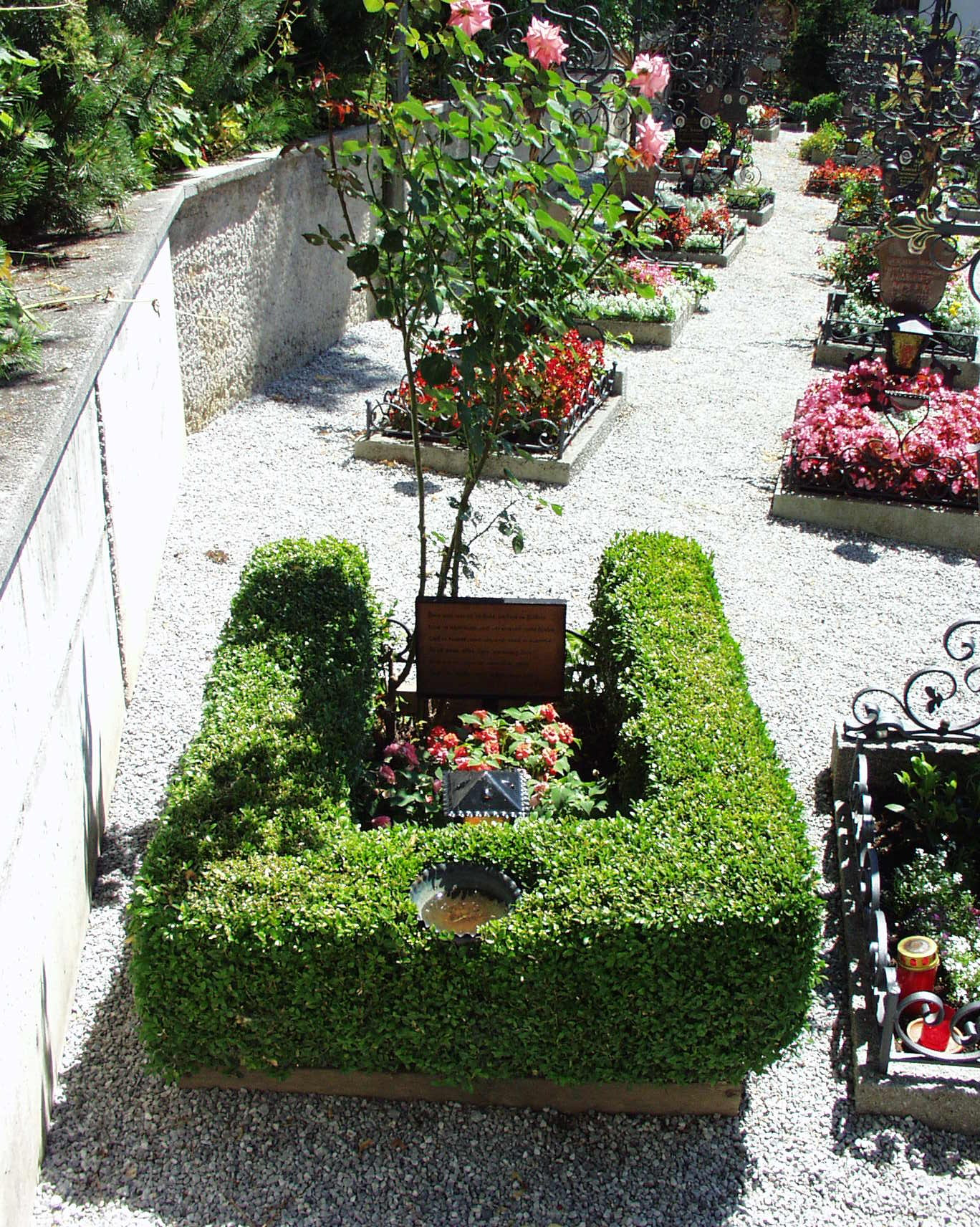
Grave of Erwin Schrödinger

== Economy ==
=== Tourism ===
Tourism began to develop in Alpbach around the beginning of the 20th century, and by 1938 the village had 110 guest beds. During the 2025 summer season, Alpbach had 210 accommodation establishments providing 1,672 guest beds, while the 2024/25 winter season recorded 213 establishments and 2,758 guest beds. In 2025, Alpbach recorded 401,116 tourist overnight stays.

== Modern Alpbach ==
In 1999, the new Alpbach Congress Centre was opened, together with the 55th European Forum. The main architectural feature is a spiral shaped gallery with floor-to-ceiling glazing for a view of the mountain backdrop. It has a minimum environmental footprint.

Alpbach is another ski resort in the area, and its slopes include beginner to intermediate runs with many off pistes, as well as unpatrolled Route 5, and a halfpipe. A new lift has been opened in 2006-2007, which is designed in a gondola style, and allows people to move from Inner-Alpbach to near the top of the Wiedersberger Horn, the mountain used for the runs. Alpbach is also more popular with skiers than snowboarders due to the lack of extreme off piste, but is a very popular place for beginner boarders, or those looking to re-kindle their boarding passion. There are three ski schools in the village, the first is the original Ski and Snowboardschool at Alpbach-Inneralpbach run since 1932 by Sepp Margreiter, a state-certified ski instructor and ski guide. The second is the Alpbach Active Skischule, of which the HQ of the ski school run from Alpbach, the same as the original ski school. The third is Schischule Alpbachtal, or SkiCheck. This is the most recently established ski school in the valley, founded in 2012.
