= Leoganger Ache =

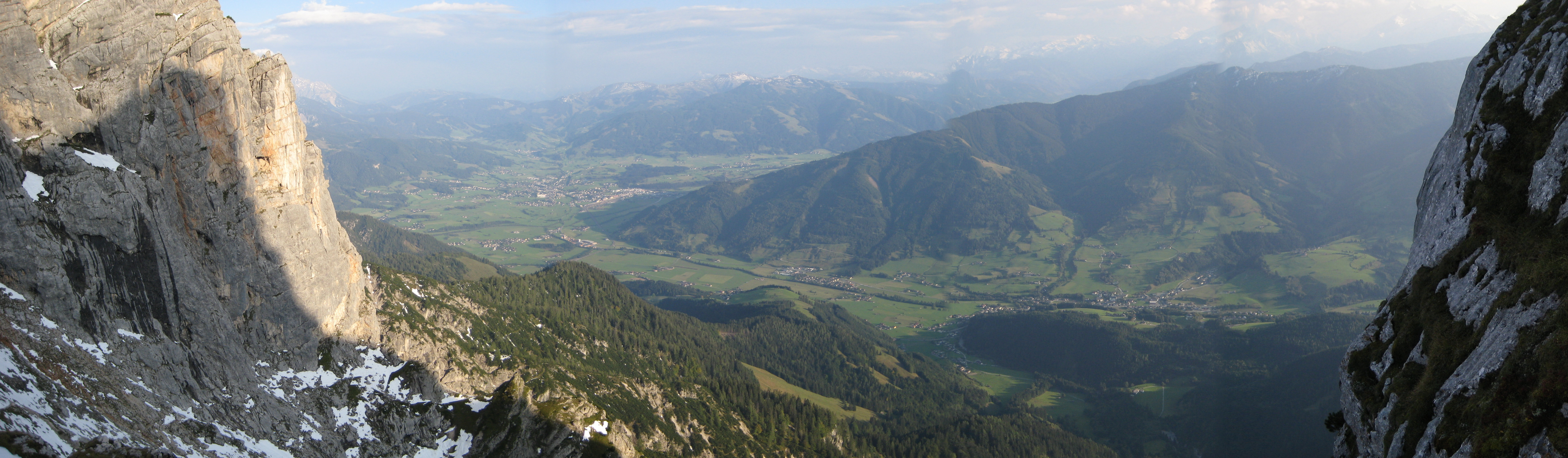
- Lower reaches of the Leoganger Ache, with Saalfelden on the left and Leogang, seen from the Passau Hut, view to the south

Location
- Country: Austria
- State: Salzburg
- District: Zell am See District (Pinzgau)

Physical characteristics
- Source
  - location: Schwarzleobach ∞ Grießner Bach:: in Hütten (Leogang)
  - coordinates: 47°26′30″N 12°42′20″E
  - elevation: ca. 960 m (AA)
- Mouth
  - location: Saalach near Uttenhofen, Saalfelden
  - coordinates: 47°26′22″N 12°49′23″E
  - elevation: 720 m (AA)
- Length: 15 km (9.3 mi)

Basin features
- Progression: Saalach→ Salzach→ Inn→ Danube→ Black Sea
- Landmarks: Villages: Leogang, Saalfelden (Uttenhofen)

The Leoganger Ache is a river of Salzburg, Austria, a left tributary of the Saalach.

The Leonganger Ache drains the valley of the same name, the Leoganger Tal. It originates near the border with Tyrol in Hütten, municipality of Leogang, at a height of 960 m (3,150 ft) out of its two headstreams:

- the Schwarzleobach stream, which flows from the southwest below the Spielberghorn mountain in the Tyrolean Slate Alps (north of Saalbach) having risen on the Spielbergtörl, at about 1,600 m (5,200 ft) and
- the Grießner Bach, which flows down from the Grießen Pass at 970 m (3,180 ft) from the Grießensee and the Grießener Moor.

It flows from west to east and ist about 15 km (9.3 mi) long, including the Schwarzleobach 22 km (14 mi).

After half its way it passes through the municipality of Leogang. The Leoganger Valley falls openly and gently into the Saalfelden Basin. Northwest of Saalfelden, in the parish of Uttenhofen, the Leoganger Ache discharges into the Saalach; at a triple confluence with the Urslau.

Its northern, right hand tributaries comprise several mountain streams that drain the limestone massif of the Leogang Mountains (the Grießbach and Weissbach empty into the Grießner Bach, the Birnbach from Birnhorn joins at Leogang and the Weissbach at Ecking). From the Slate Alps the main streams are the Schwarzbach (with the Dunkelkendlbach from the Asitz and the Klammbach from the Halderbergkogel).

The B 164 Hochkönig Road (which comes from Bischofshofen via Dienten and Saalfelden) runs along the Leoganger Valley over the Grießen Pass and via Fieberbrunn to St. Johann in Tirol – it is the only internal Austria link between Tyrol and the east that does not cross a high Alpine pass, but is also linked to Salzburg via the Little German Corner.
