= Hochkönig Road =

Austrian state road

State road B164
- Landesstraße B164
- Hochkönig Road; Hochkönigstraße (Austrian German)

Route information
- Length: 75 km (47 mi)

Location
- Country: Austria
- States: Salzburg, Tyrol

Highway system
- Highways of Austria; Autobahns; Expressways; State Roads

The Hochkönig Road (German: Hochkönig Straße or, in Tyrol, Hochkönigstraße), – the B 164 – is a state road (Landesstraße) in Austria. It has a length of 75 kilometres (47 mi). Beginning in Bischofshofen in the Salzach valley, it runs initially between the Hochkönig and Dienten Mountains along the Dienten Saddle (1,342 m (AA)) and on into the valley of the Saalach to Saalfelden am Steinernen Meer. On the far side of the Saalach the road runs into the Leoganger Tal between the Leoganger Steinberge and the Loferer Steinberge to the north and the Kitzbühel Alps to the south via Leogang up to the Grießen Pass (975 m above sea level (AA)), and via Fieberbrunn downhill again into the valley of the Kitzbühler Ache to St. Johann in Tirol. On the last section the road runs parallel to the Salzburg-Tyrol Railway.

== History ==
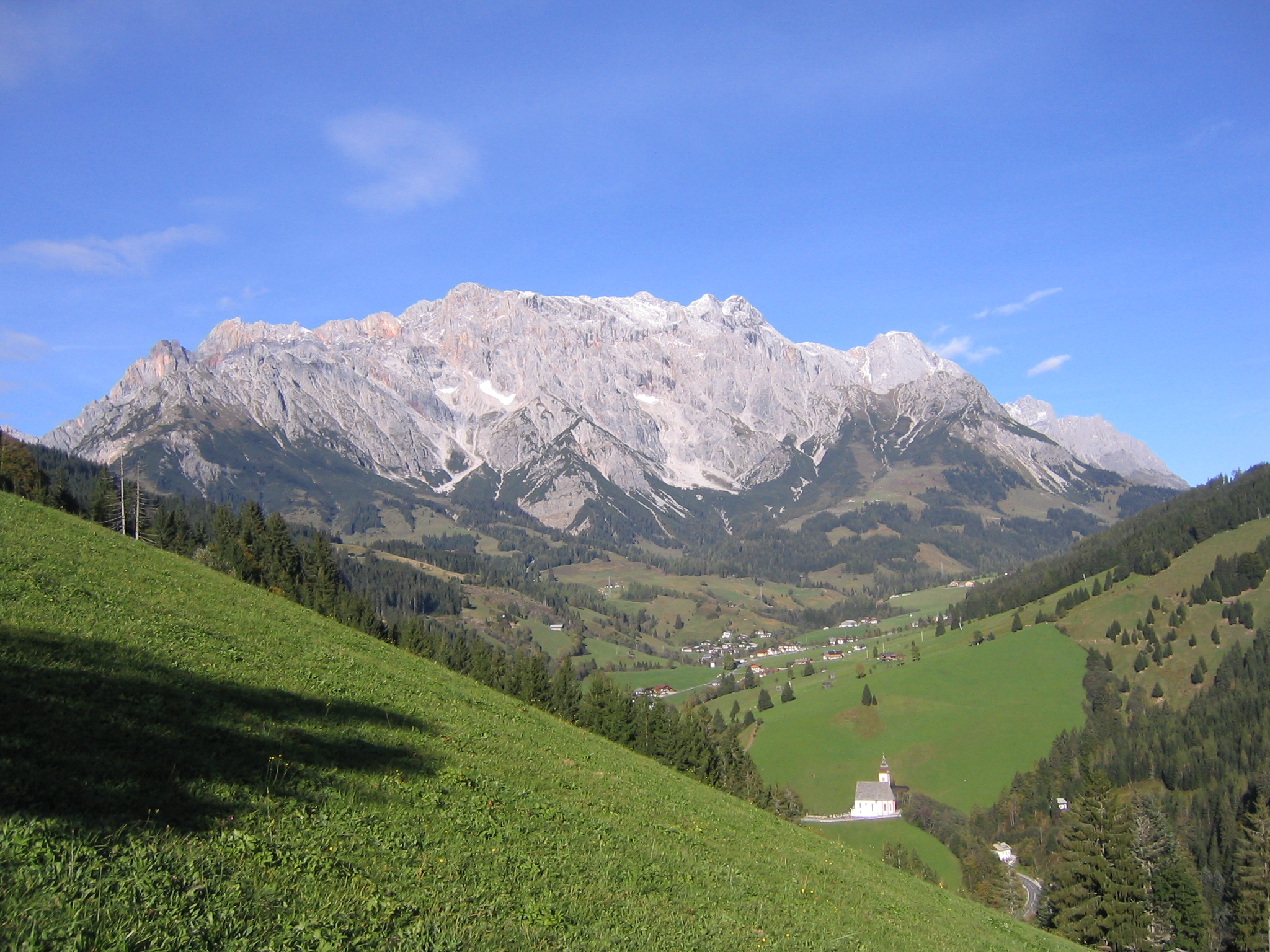
Hochkönig and Dienten valley, through which the Hochkönig Road runs

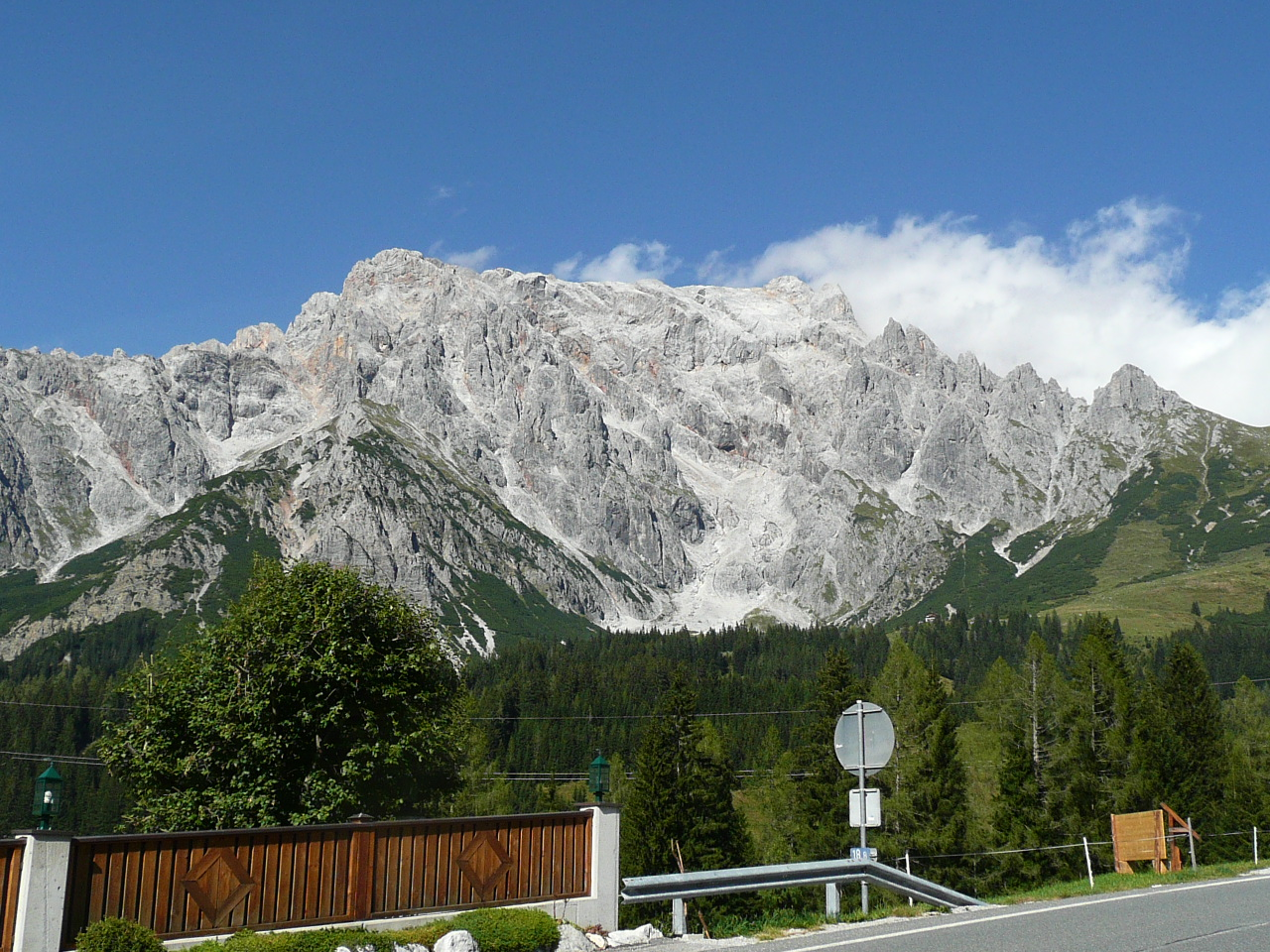
Hochkönig seen from 3 km below the Dienten Saddle on the B164

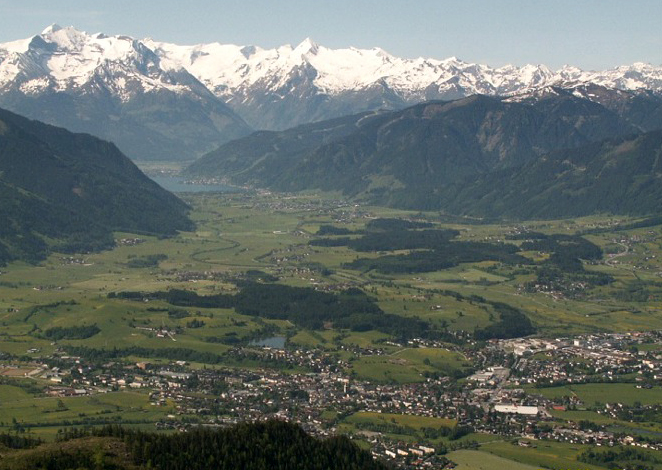
Saalfelden am Steinernen Meer seen from the northeast

Since 1948 three sections of the present-day Hochkönig Road in the state of Salzburg have been classified as Class II state highways ( Landesstraßen):

- The 9.6 km-long (6.0 mi) Mühlbach Road (Mühlbacher Straße) between Bischofshofen and Mühlbach
- The 5.7 km-long (3.5 mi) Alm Road (Almer Straße) between Alm and Saalfelden
- The 7.1 km-long (4.4 mi) long Leogang Road (Leoganger Straße) between Saalfelden and Leogang

With effect from 1 July 1962 the last two roads were extended:

- The Alm Road was lengthened by 8.2 km (5.1 mi) as far as Hinterthal.
- The Leogang Road was lengthened by 11.0 km (6.8 mi) as far as the Tyrolean state border at the Grießen Pass.

The middle section between Mühlbach and Hinterthal wurde was declared a Konkurrenzstraße (literally "competitive road") by the state act of 11 April 1962. In Austrian legal language Konkurrenz means joint financing of a project by various institutions, of which each takes on a legally defined percentage of the maintenance costs. In this case the shares were:

- the State of Salzburg 65.00%
- the municipality of Alm 8.00%
- the municipality of Bischofshofen 2.25%
- the municipality of Dienten am Hochkönig 8.00%
- the municipality of Mühlbach am Hochkönig 8.00%
- the municipality of Saalfelden 3.75%
- the Austrian State Forests 5.00%

The Hochkönig Road has been part of the network of federal highways (Bundestrassen) in Austria since 1 Jan 1973.

== Traffic restrictions ==
The following restrictions apply to the Hochkönig Road: no entry on the B 164 Hochkönigstraße from km 56.251 (Hochfilzen municipality) to km 75.76 (St. Johann in Tirol) in both directions for lorries over 7.5 tonnes (7.4 long tons; 8.3 short tons) maximum permitted weight, excluding recovery and breakdown vehicles, military vehicles and lorries that load or unload, start or finish their journeys in the following municipalities: St. Johann in Tirol and Fieberbrunn in Tyrol, Hochfilzen and Leogang in the state of Salzburg.

== Junction lists ==
Legend:

- I/C - Interchange, I/S - Intersection, RSA - Rest and service area, OBR - Overhead bridge restaurant, R/R - Restaurant and rest plaza, L/B - Layby, V/P - Vista point, TN - tunnel, T/P - Toll plaza, BR - Bridge
- C - Cloverleaf, S - Stack, T-A - Trumpet-A, T-B - Trumpet-B, DT - Directional-T/Y, SDT - Semi-Directional-T/Y, P-Y - Partial-Y, D - Diamond, P-C - Partial cloverleaf, D-D - Diverging diamond, D-R - Direct ramp

State	District	Km	Exit	Name	Destinations	Notes
Salzburg	St. Johann im Pongau			Pinzgauer Straße	B 311	
Salzburg	St. Johann im Pongau		BR	Salzach		
Salzburg	St. Johann im Pongau		BR	Salzburg-Tyrol Railway		
Salzburg	St. Johann im Pongau			Salzachtal Straße	B 159	
Salzburg	St. Johann im Pongau			Mühlbach am Hochkönig		
Salzburg	Zell am See			Dienten Saddle		1,342 m (AA)
Salzburg	Zell am See			December to March		
Salzburg	Zell am See			Dienten am Hochkönig		
Salzburg	Zell am See		BR	Urslau		
Salzburg	Zell am See			Maria Alm		
Salzburg	Zell am See		BR	Urslau		
Salzburg	Zell am See		BR	Urslau		
Salzburg	Zell am See			Saalfelden am Steinernen Meer	B 311	
Salzburg	Zell am See		BR	Urslau		
Salzburg	Zell am See		BR	Saalach		
Salzburg	Zell am See		BR	Salzburg-Tyrol Railway		
Salzburg	Zell am See			Leogang		
Salzburg	Zell am See		BR	Leoganger Ache		
Salzburg	Zell am See			Grießen Pass		975 m (AA)
Tyrol	Kitzbühel			Hochfilzen		
Tyrol	Kitzbühel			Barred to lorry traffic over 7.5 t from km 56.251 to km 75.76		
Tyrol	Kitzbühel			Fieberbrunn		
Tyrol	Kitzbühel		BR	Fieberbrunner Ache		
Tyrol	Kitzbühel		BR	Salzburg-Tyrolean Railway		
Tyrol	Kitzbühel		BR	Kitzbühler Ache		
Tyrol	Kitzbühel			St. Johann in Tirol	B 178	
