= Filzen Saddle =

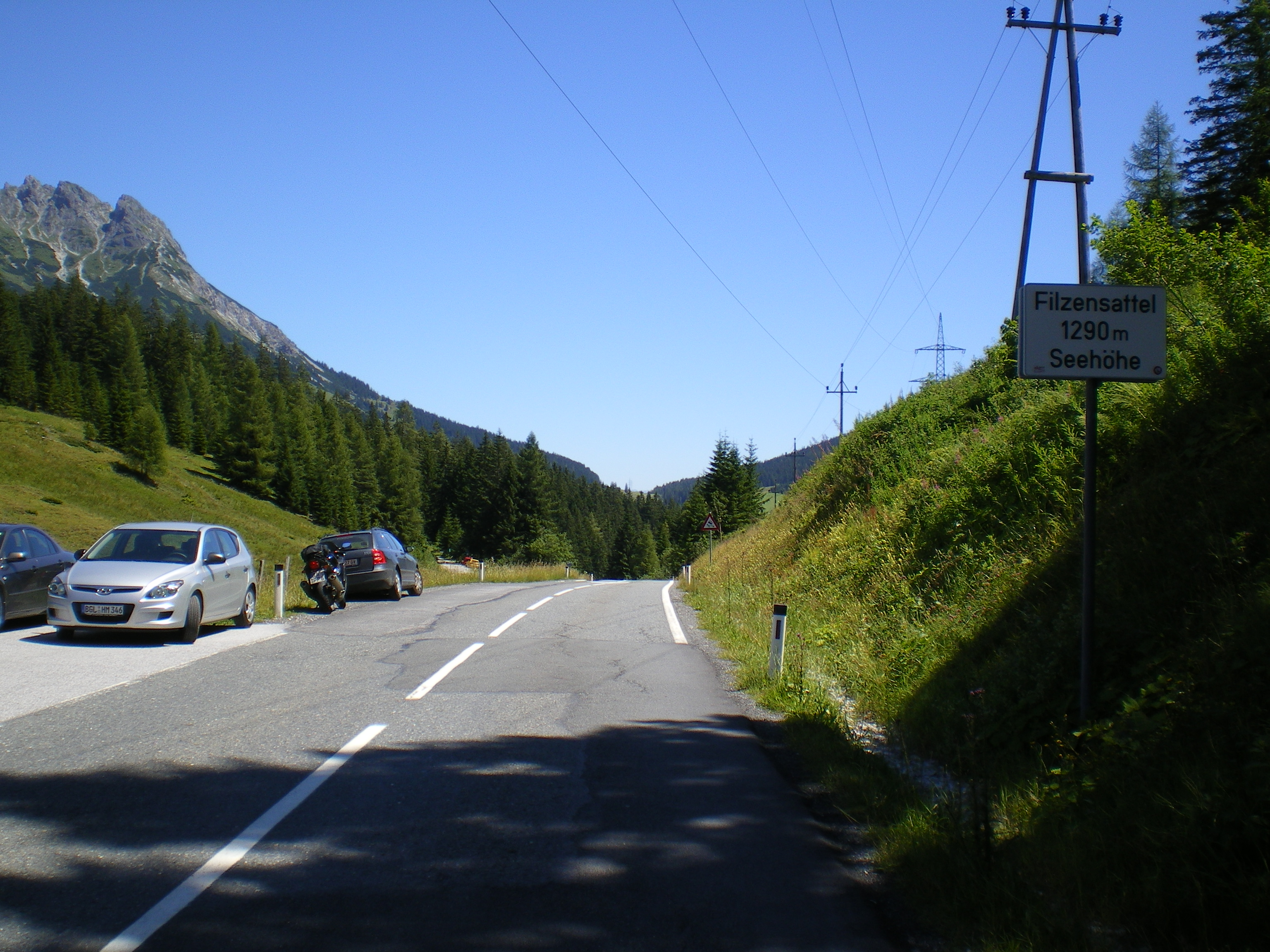
- Signpost at the top of the pass

- Location within Alps
- Elevation: 1,291 m (4,236 ft)
- Traversed by: B164

Third Approach
- Location: Bezirk Zell am See; Urslau; Austria
- Range: Alps
- Coordinates: 47°23′50″N 13°0′6″E

The Filzen Saddle (German: Filzensattel) is a mountain pass, 1,290 m above sea level (AA) high, between Saalfelden near Hinterthal/Maria Alm in the Pinzgau region and Dienten in the Pongau in the Austrian state of Salzburg. The Hochkönig Road (B 164) crosses the saddle linking Saalfelden via the Dienten Saddle and Bischofshofen.

The Filzen Saddle is the lowest crossing between the Filzenkopf (1,513 m above sea level (AA)) to the north and the Gabühel (1,596 m above sea level (AA)) southwest of the saddle.
