= Saalach Valley =

Valley in Austria and Germany

Coordinates: 47°32′N 12°44′E

Saalachtal (Alps)

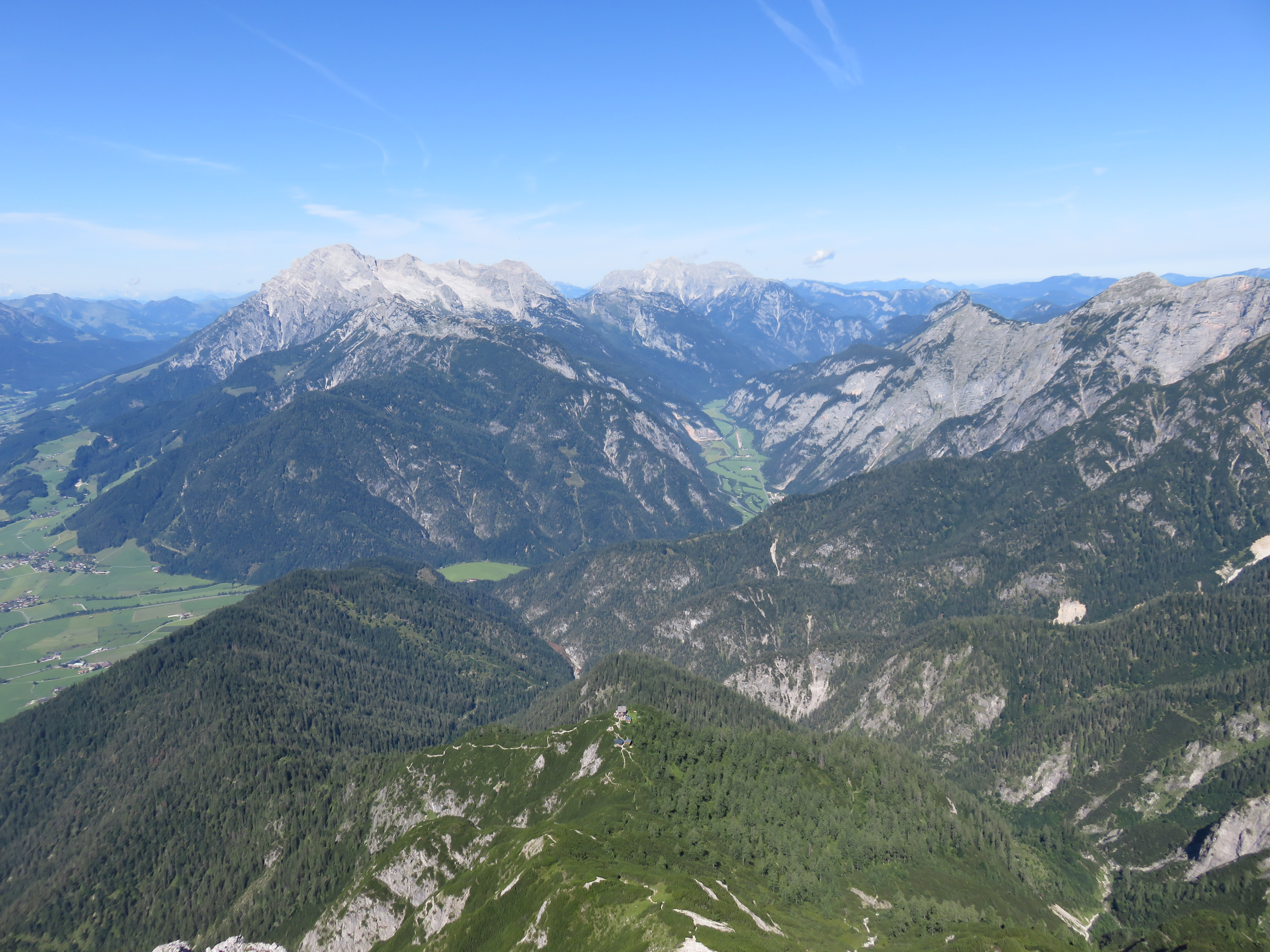
The Saalach Valley in front of the Lofer and Leogang Mountains

The Saalach Valley (German: Saalachtal) is the name of the middle and upper reaches of the Saalach, a mountain river in the Austrian state of Salzburg (Pinzgau and Flachgau regions) and the southern part of the German state of Bavaria (in Berchtesgadener Land).

== Course and countryside ==
The main valley is about 70 km long and begins north of the Zeller See. It forms the broad vale of the Saalfelden Basin, the heart of the Saalachpinzgau region. Initially it separates the Kitzbühel Alps in the west, from where the Saalach originates, from the Salzburg Slate Alps in the east; later, it divides the Loferer Steinberge and the Chiemgau Alps in the west from the Berchtesgaden Alps in the east. Near Reichenhall and Großgmain the valley broadens again and ends between Freilassing and Salzburg, the Saalach flowing for its last few kilometres through the plain of the Salzburg-Freilassing Basin.

The roughly 30 km long upper reaches of the Saalach is not called the Saalachtal, but bears the name Glemmtal, the area of its source streams being called Hinterglemm.

== Geology ==
The Saalach Valley was formed by the Salzach-Saalach Glacier. When it retreated the glacier left behind thick sheets of morainic debris about 10,000 years ago that extend from the Zeller See in the north to just in front of Saalfelden, roughly by the Kühbichl (875 m). In the post-glacial period, the Saalach flowed into the Zeller See and then into the Salzach river to the south. The drift deposits from the Glemmtal, that were laid down between the Zeller See and Maishofen as gravel, blocked the southerly course of the Saalach and force it to flow northwards along its present riverbed. This has been evinced by excavations between Atzing and Unterreit.

== Tributaries and transport ==
The Pinzgau Road (B 311) runs through the Saalach Valley from Zell am See to just after Lofer followed by a short section of the Lofer Road (B 178) as far as the Austro-German border. In Bavaria the line of the valley is followed by the Bundesstraße 21 and, from Piding, the Bundesstraße 20. This route is known as the Little German Corner (Kleines Deutsches Eck).

== Sources ==
- Das Saalachtalbahn-Projekt. Juni 1912. K. K. Hof- u. Staatsdruckerei, Wien 1912.
