= Dienten Saddle =

Mountain pass in Austria

Dienten Saddle Dientner Sattel
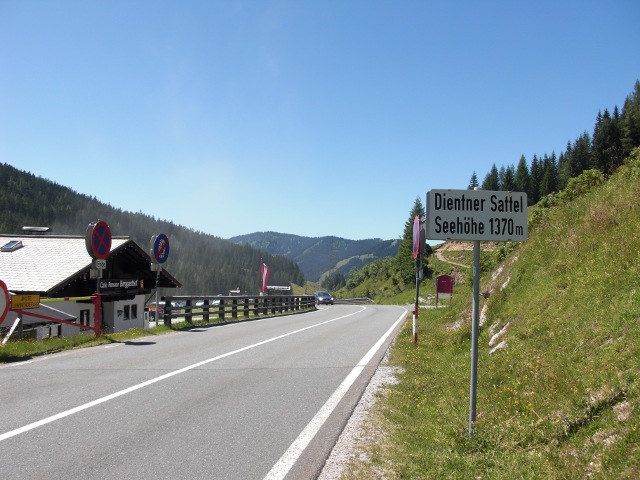
- Elevation signpost at the top of the pass

- Location within Alps
- Elevation: 1,342 metres (4,403 ft)
- Traversed by: B164

Third Approach
- Location: Bezirk Zell am See; St. Johann im Pongau; Austria
- Range: Berchtesgaden Alps, Salzburg Slate Alps
- Coordinates: 47°23′19″N 13°01′56″E

The Dienten Saddle (German: Dientner Sattel) is a mountain col at a height of 1,342 metres (4,403 ft) in the Austrian state of Salzburg. The pass is open all-year round and traversed by the Hochkönig Road (B 164) that links Bischofshofen in the east with Saalfelden in the west. Between these two places there is also the Filzen Saddle.
