= Großes Ochsenhorn =

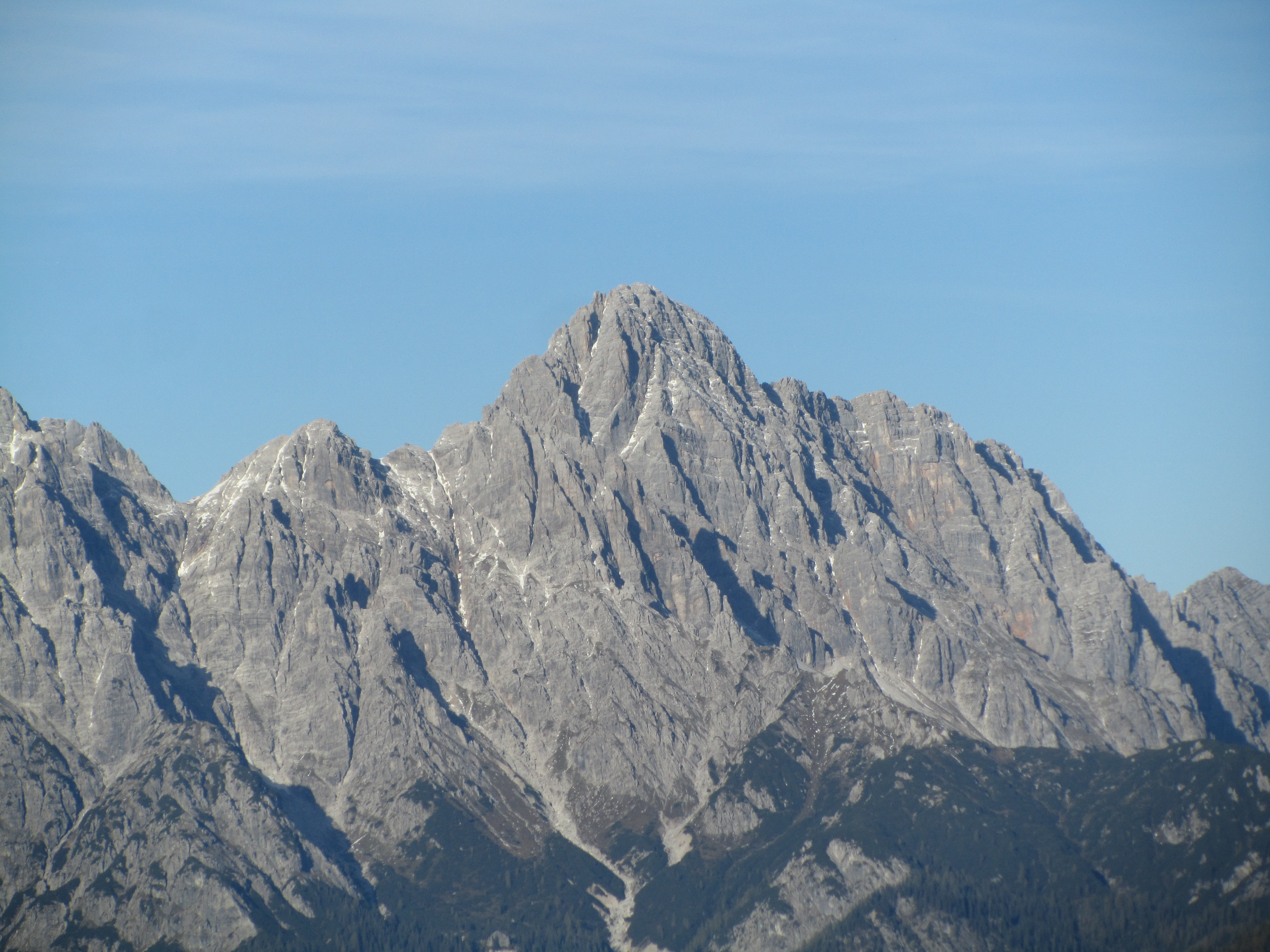
- Großes Ochsenhorn

Highest point
- Elevation: 2,511 m (8,238 ft)
- Prominence: 1,309 m (4,295 ft)
- Coordinates: 47°32′00″N 12°40′00″E

Geography
- Location within Alps
- Location: Austria
- Parent range: Loferer Steinberge

Großes Ochsenhorn (2,511m) is a mountain in Salzburg, Austria. It is the highest mountain in the Loferer Steinberge range. It is surrounded by a karst plateau. The mountain's name in German is translated as "Great Oxen Horn". The nearest town is Lofer in the Saalachtal valley, and the mountain takes about six hours to climb from here.
