= Grießen =

Grießen may refer to:

- Grießen Pass, an alpine pass in Austria
- Grießen (Klettgau), a village in the municipality of Klettgau in Germany
