= Teufelsschlucht =

Teufelsschlucht is German for "devil's gorge" and may refer to:

- Devil's Gorge (Eifel), a gorge in the Eifel mountains near Echternach in Germany
- A gorge in the Saalach Valley, Austria
- A gorge near Wehlen/Saxony, Germany
- Devil's Gorge (Switzerland), a karst gorge near Hägendorf in Switzerland
- A gorge in Alstedde near Ibbenbüren in Tecklenburg Land, Germany
