= Ranggeln =

Variant of wrestling in the eastern alps

- Focus: Wrestling
- Olympic sport: No

Ranggeln, Ranggln, is a sub-sport of wrestling with a long tradition in the Eastern Alps.

The aim of a fight is to bring the opponent to the ground with both shoulder blades using various holds and throws within a six-minute fight time in order to win the fight and move on to the next round. If the six-minute fight time has expired without there being a winner, the fight is considered a draw, which means that both participants are eliminated.

The winner of a competition acquires the title of Hogmoar (also Hagmoar or Hoagmoar). This term comes from Hag (hedge, property boundary) and Meier (administrator) and used to describe an old office of free farmers with regard to jurisdiction in property matters.

== Distribution ==
Ranggeln is particularly widespread in the Alpine region, especially in South Tyrol, North Tyrol, East Tyrol, Upper Carinthia, Salzburg, the Bavarian Oberland and Chiemgau. There are numerous ranging clubs in these regions.

One of the most famous wrestling events is the Ranggeln at Hundstein in Salzburg. This Hundstoaranggeln was declared a UNESCO national intangible cultural heritage in Austria in 2010.

== See also ==
- Ringen
- Schwingen
- Judo
- Sumō
- Grappling
- Wrestling
