= Gerhard Fellner =

Football player and manager (born 1970)

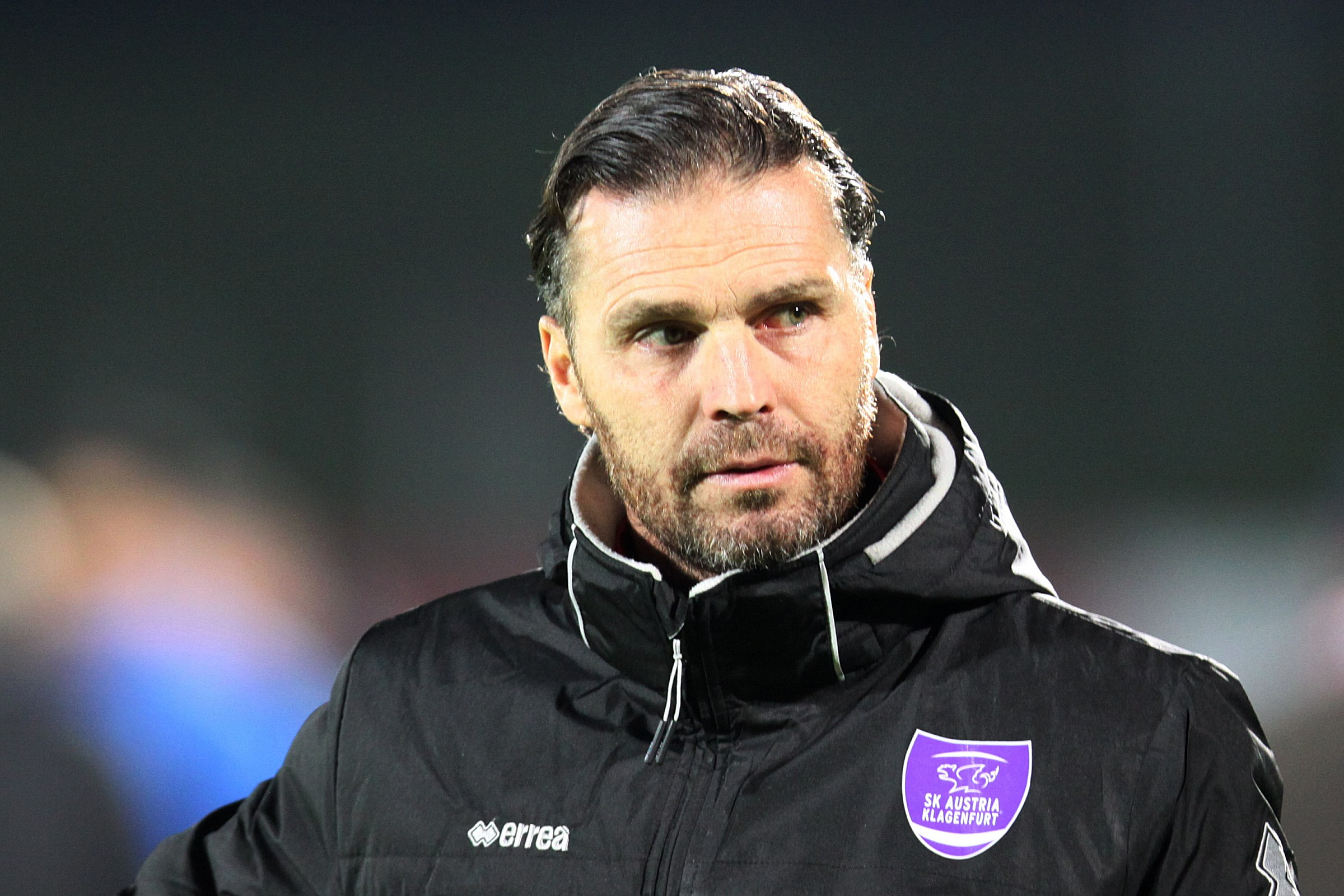
- Fellner in 2015

Personal information
- Date of birth: 24 April 1970 (age 56)
- Place of birth: Saalfelden, Austria
- Height: 1.86 m (6 ft 1 in)
- Position: Defender

Youth career
- ASV Salzburg

Senior career*
Years	Team	Apps	(Gls)
1989–1991	Casino Salzburg	23	(2)
1991–1992	SR Donaufeld		
1992–1993	FC Puch		
1993–1996	FC Braunau	22	(3)
1996–1997	SKN St. Pölten	16	(5)
1997	Falkirk		
1997–1998	SKN St. Pölten	25	(2)
1998–2002	FC Admira Wacker Mödling	91	(4)
2002–2003	St. Mirren	1	(0)
2003–2004	LASK	28	(6)
2004	SV Grieskirchen	11	(5)
2004–2005	SPG FC Pasching/LASK Juniors	2	(0)
2005–2007	LASK	59	(4)
2007–2010	First Vienna FC	79	(8)
2010–2011	SV Karlstetten/Neidling		
2011–2012	SC Litschau		

Managerial career
- 2010–2013: First Vienna (assistant)
- 2013: First Vienna
- 2015: St. Pölten II
- 2015–2016: Austria Klagenfurt (assistant)
- 2016: Austria Klagenfurt
- 2017–2018: Wiener Neustadt (assistant)
- 2018–2019: Wiener Neustadt
- * Club domestic league appearances and goals

Gerhard Fellner (born 24 April 1970) is a football manager and former player.

== Coaching career ==
=== Early career ===
Fellner started his coaching career as an assistant coach at First Vienna FC in 2010 and was promoted to head coach on 12 June 2013. However, his tenure as head coach lasted 53 days and was sacked on 4 August 2013. Fellner had lost all three league matches; losing his first 2 league matches 4–1 and his last match 3–0. He had won his Austrian Cup match 2–1.

== Coaching record ==
As of 31 January 2014

Team	From	To	Record								
Team	From	To	G	W	D	L	GF	GA	GD	Win %	Ref.
First Vienna FC	12 June 2013	4 August 2013	4	1	0	3	4	12	−8	25.00	
SKN St. Pölten II	23 March 2015	30 June 2015	11	4	5	2	19	17	+2	36.36	
Austria Klagenfurt	16 March 2016	-	26	4	4	18	24	56	−32	15.38	
Total			41	9	9	23	47	85	−38	21.95	—
