= Johann Oberreiter =

Executed Austrian murderer and suspected serial killer

- Born: 8 May 1807; Dienten am Hochkönig, Austrian Empire
- Died: 26 July 1865 (aged 58); Salzburg, Austrian Empire
- Cause of death: Execution by hanging
- Conviction: Murder ×2
- Penalty: Death

Details
- Victims: 2–3
- Span of crimes: April – May 1864 (possibly 1855)
- Country: Austria
- State: Salzburg
- Date apprehended: 1864

Johann Oberreiter (8 May 1807 – 26 July 1865) was an Austrian murderer and politician. He was convicted of poisoning his stepdaughter and a biological daughter in 1864, but is also suspected in the death of his first wife in 1855. He was sentenced to death for the latter murders, and hanged in 1865.

== Biography ==
=== Early life ===
Johann Oberreiter was born on 8 May 1807, in Dienten am Hochkönig. Nothing is known of his childhood, but as a teenager, he studied as a baker in Radstadt. While working in this profession, he became acquainted with the wealthy widow Maria Schintelmaißer, whose husband was also a baker. In order to impress her, Oberreiter joined the army, succeeding in courting her. The family soon had two daughters and two sons, as well as a stepdaughter from Schintelmaißer's previous marriage, and it was regarded as wealthy and respectable in the village, although Maria was considered choleric and neglectful towards her children. In 1843, Oberreiter was appointed the mayor of Werfen, and held this office until 1848. On 25 May 1855, his wife mysteriously died at age 49, and Oberreiter became the sole owner of the house and business. However, he found himself in debt a few years later, and on 8 March 1859, he married the 38-year-old surgeon Anna Meneweger, which produced no children. Despite his marriage, Oberreiter's economic situation remained tense, as creditors kept demanding that he pay off his debts and banks refused to grant him any further loans.

=== Murders, trial and investigation ===
On 26 April 1864, Oberreiter's stepdaughter Eva died, followed by biological daughter Barbara on May 17. His wife believed the rumors that they had been poisoned, much like his first wife, and reported her suspicions to the police, claiming that she had observed her husband trying to convince his stepdaughter to poison herself for some time. Concerning his motive, it was suspected that he wanted to the 500 guilders in insurance money, and possibly to rid himself of mental anguish, as almost all of his children were either mentally or physically disabled. Eva had suffered from diarrhea and had been vomiting frequently since 1862, but considering this part of her gout, the coroner examining her body treated this as normal, and she was buried without any further examination. After Barbara, who had shown similar symptomps, died three weeks later and her father quickly arranged her funeral, his wife decided to tell the police. In her complaint, she assumed that both daughters had been poisoned with cupric acetate. When their bodies were exhumed and autopsied, the coroners found traces of arsenic.

After his arrest, Oberreiter confessed that he had given his daughters mead laced with arsenic, which he claimed had purchased from a wandering chandler as a wax remover. During the first interrogations, he said that he had administered only a small amount in order to shorten their suffering, but later on, he revoked this statement and changed it several times. In order to clarify suspicions whether he had murdered his first wife, her body was also exhumed and autopsied. While traces of arsenic were found in her body, they were also found in an accompanying nosegay, which had stains from arsenic and copper. Thusly, coroners were unable to determine whether the poison originated from the corpse or the flowers themselves.

On 27 February 1865, the trial against Oberreiter began at the Salzburg Regional Court, lasting until March 4, with the stands constantly being crowded by an audience interested in the case. After a day of deliberation, the court found Oberreiter guilty of poisoning his daughters, but was acquitted in his wife's death due to lack of evidence. He was sentenced to death by hanging, and subsequently executed on 26 July 1865. He was the last person executed in Salzburg for the remainder of the 19th-century.

His old house in Werfen is now part of a hotel and restaurant ran by brothers Karl and Rudolf Obauer.

== Contemporary accounts ==
Aimé Wouwermans published a book on the case in 1865. In it, he said that because of his appearance, Oberreiter hardly looked like someone who would commit murder, but nevertheless had the creeping, crawling nature of a reptile, fixing its victim with its gaze before abruptly sneaking up to a place suitable for either attack or defense. At only a few short intervals he noticed indistinct signs of excitement, which had a profound effect on other audience members.

The Neue bayrische Kurier (New Bavarian Courier) reported extensively on the trial, noting that, among other things, Oberreiter's wife Anna had refused to testify against him on the advice of her pastor, who cited that "[he] was still her husband". According to the newspaper, Oberreiter was called a hypocrite by fellow prisoners, and was ill-regarded. The Augsburger Tagblatt reported that Oberreiter had wanted to fix his debts by marrying one of his sons to a rich woman, which fell through because of his sickly daughters. They also claimed that while he was in prison, other inmates called him the "praying brother". The autopsies and examinations of the items confiscated from the household were extensively examined in a special publication of the Vienna Medical Press: Organ für Praxis Ärzte.
