= Hundstein (Salzburg Slate Alps) =

Mountain in the Pinzgau region of Austria

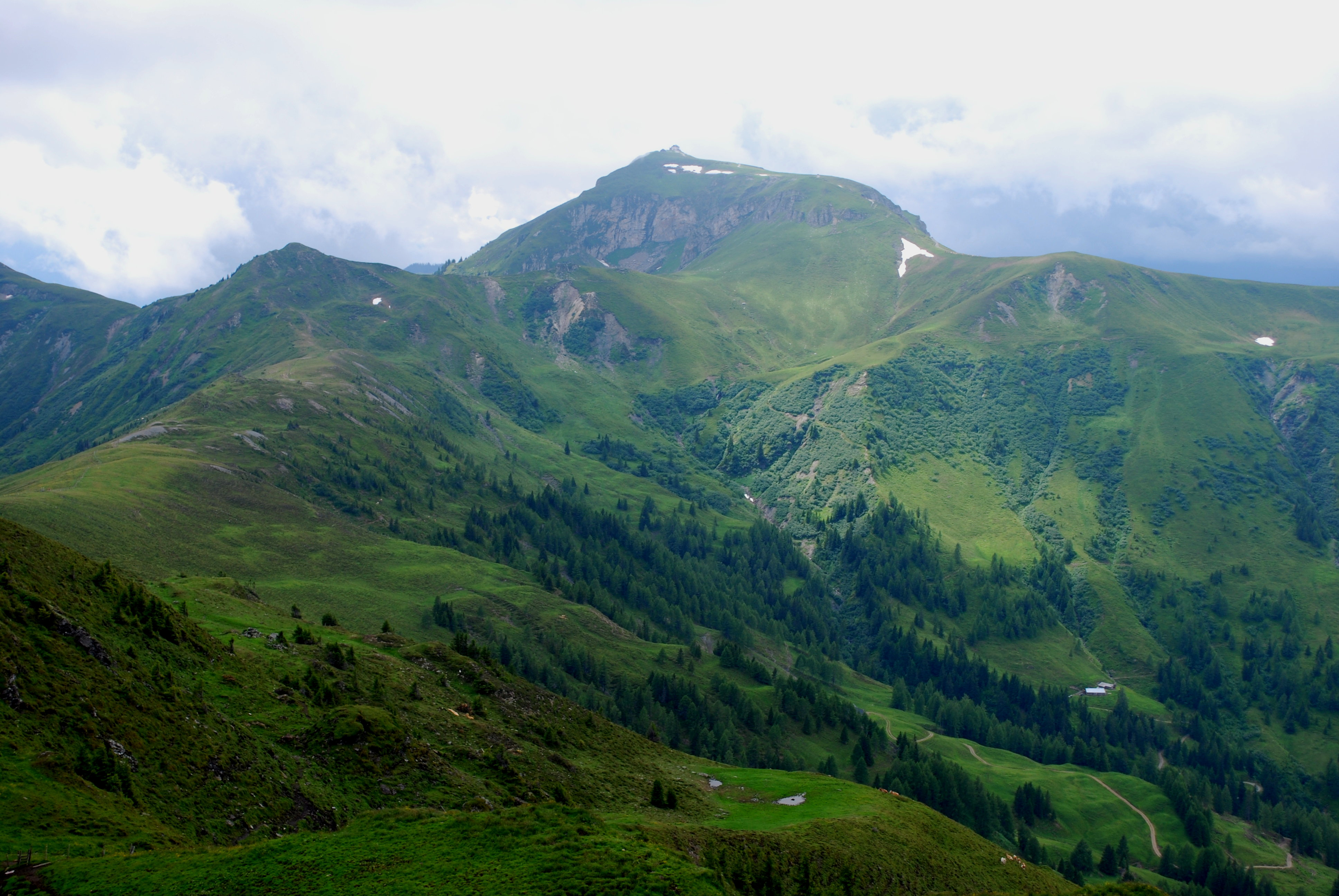
- Hundstein

Highest point
- Elevation: 2,117 m (6,946 ft)
- Prominence: 827 m (2,713 ft)
- Coordinates: 47°20′17″N 12°54′40″E

Geography
- Location within Alps
- Location: Salzburg, Austria
- Parent range: Salzburg Slate Alps

The Hundstein, also High Hundstein, is a 2,117m mountain in Zell am See, in the Pinzgau region of Austria. It is the highest peak of the Salzburg Slate Alps and belongs to the subgroup of the Dienten Mountains.

The mountain is located east of Lake Zell and opposite the end of the Fusch Valley and the Großglockner High Alpine Road in the Salzach Valley.

As a group, the Hundstein, along with its neighbouring peaks Hochkasern (2,017m), Schwalbenwand (2,011m) and Gschwandtnerberg (1,612m), occupy the entire eastern half of the Dienten mountains. The main Summit itself forms the municipal boundary of Maria Alm, Zell am See, Bruck and Taxenbach.

Both the mountain, with its summit panorama of the surrounding mountains, as well as the Hundsteinsee lake (1,891 m) are very popular destinations for hiking and mountain biking in the summer. In winter, the mountain is a skiing area.
