= Birnhorn =

Mountain in Salzburg, Austria

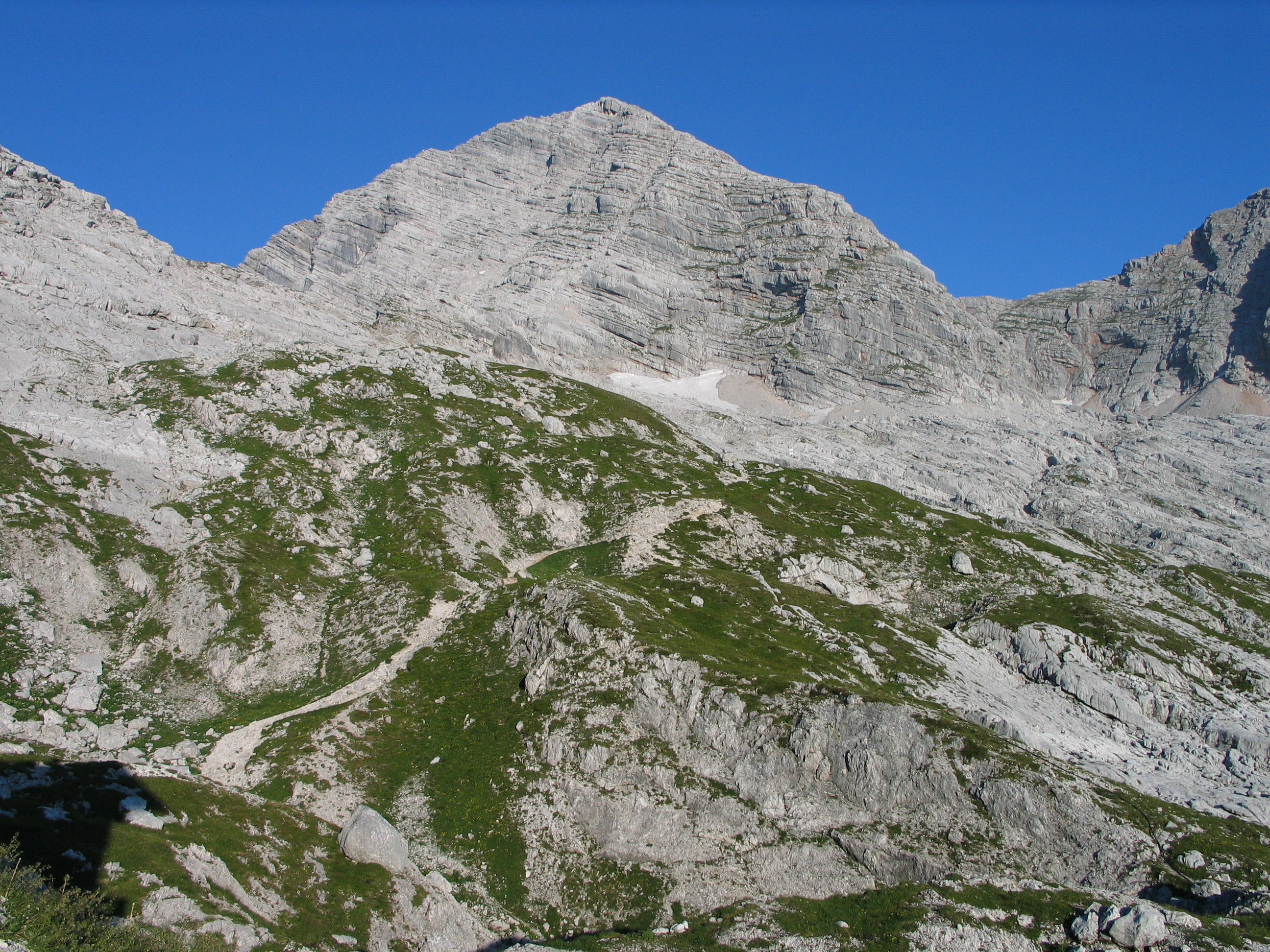

Highest point
- Elevation: 2,634 m (8,642 ft)
- Prominence: 1,665 m (5,463 ft)
- Listing: Ultra
- Coordinates: 47°28′29″N 12°44′1″E

Geography
- Location within Alps
- Location: Salzburg, Austria
- Parent range: Leoganger Steinberge, Northern Limestone Alps

The Birnhorn (2,634 m) is an isolated mountain in the Leoganger Steinberge, Northern Limestone Alps, Austria.

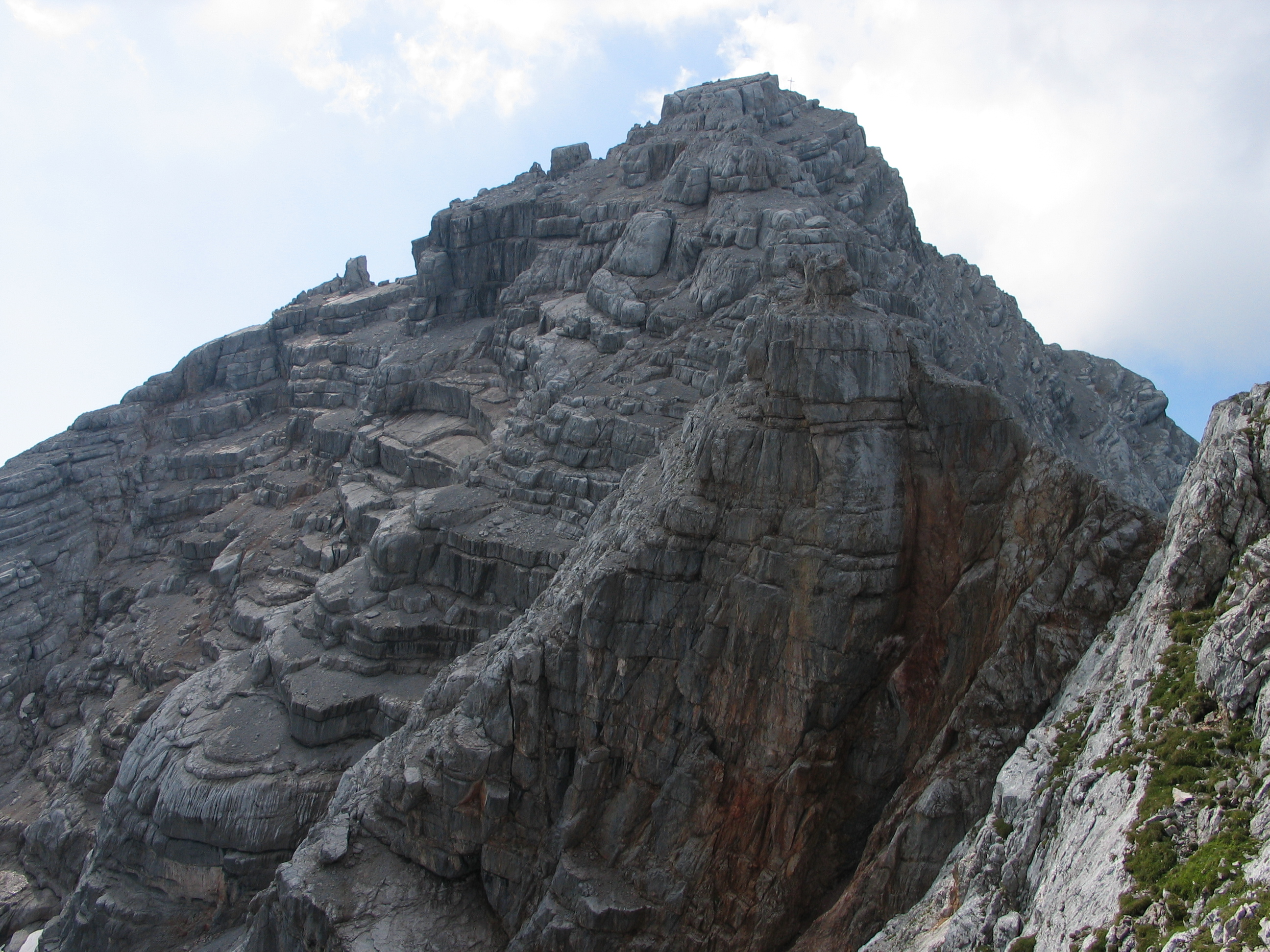
The Birnhorn seen from the North

== See also ==
- List of Alpine peaks by prominence
