= Lofer Mountains =

Mountain range in central Europe

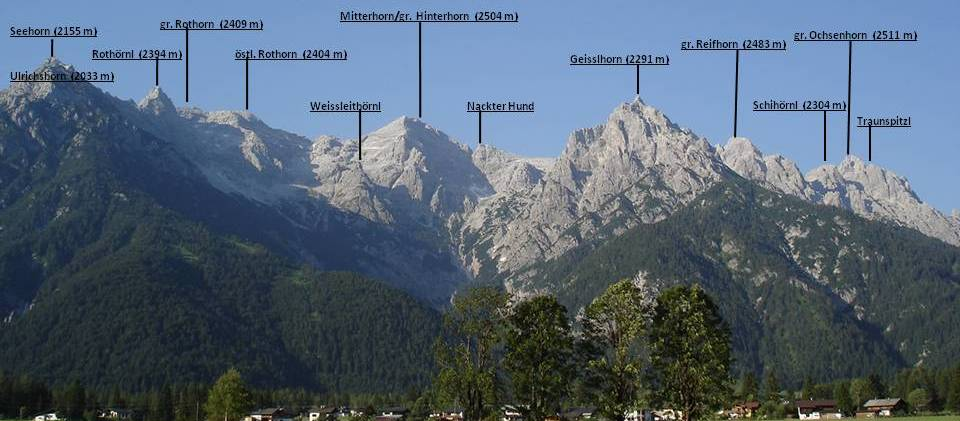
- Loferer Steinberge panorama from Sankt Ulrich am Pillersee

Highest point
- Peak: Großes Ochsenhorn
- Elevation: 2,511 m above sea level (AA)

Geography
- Location within Alps
- Country: Austria
- States: Tyrol and Salzburg
- Range coordinates: 47°32′00″N 12°39′00″E
- Parent range: Northern Limestone Alps

The Lofer Mountains or Loferer Mountains (German: Loferer Steinberge, lit. "Lofer Rock Mountains") are a mountain range in the Northern Limestone Alps in the Eastern Alps of central Europe. They are located in Austria in the federal states of Tyrol and Salzburg. The Lofers are separated from the Leogang Mountains to the southeast by a 1,202 m-high saddle known as the Römersattel.

== Summits in the Lofer Mountains ==
- Ulrichshorn 2,032 m above sea level (AA)
- Großes Ochsenhorn 2,511 m above sea level (AA)
- Mitterhorn (Großes Hinterhorn) 2,506 m above sea level (AA)
- Großes Reifhorn 2,480 m above sea level (AA)
- Breithorn 2,413 m above sea level (AA)
- Großes Rothorn 2,409 m above sea level (AA)
- Rothörnl 2,394 m above sea level (AA)
- Geislhörner 2,291 m above sea level (AA)
- Seehorn 2,155 m above sea level (AA)
- Zwölferhörnl 2,104 m above sea level (AA)

== Valley settlements ==
- Waidring
- Sankt Ulrich am Pillersee
- Hochfilzen
- Lofer
- Sankt Martin bei Lofer
- Weißbach bei Lofer

== Neighbouring mountain ranges ==
The Lofer Mountains border on the following other mountain ranges in the Alps:

- Chiemgau Alps (to the north)
- Berchtesgaden Alps (to the east)
- Leoganger Steinberge (to the southeast)
- Kitzbühel Alps (to the southwest)
- Kaisergebirge (to the west)

== Photos ==
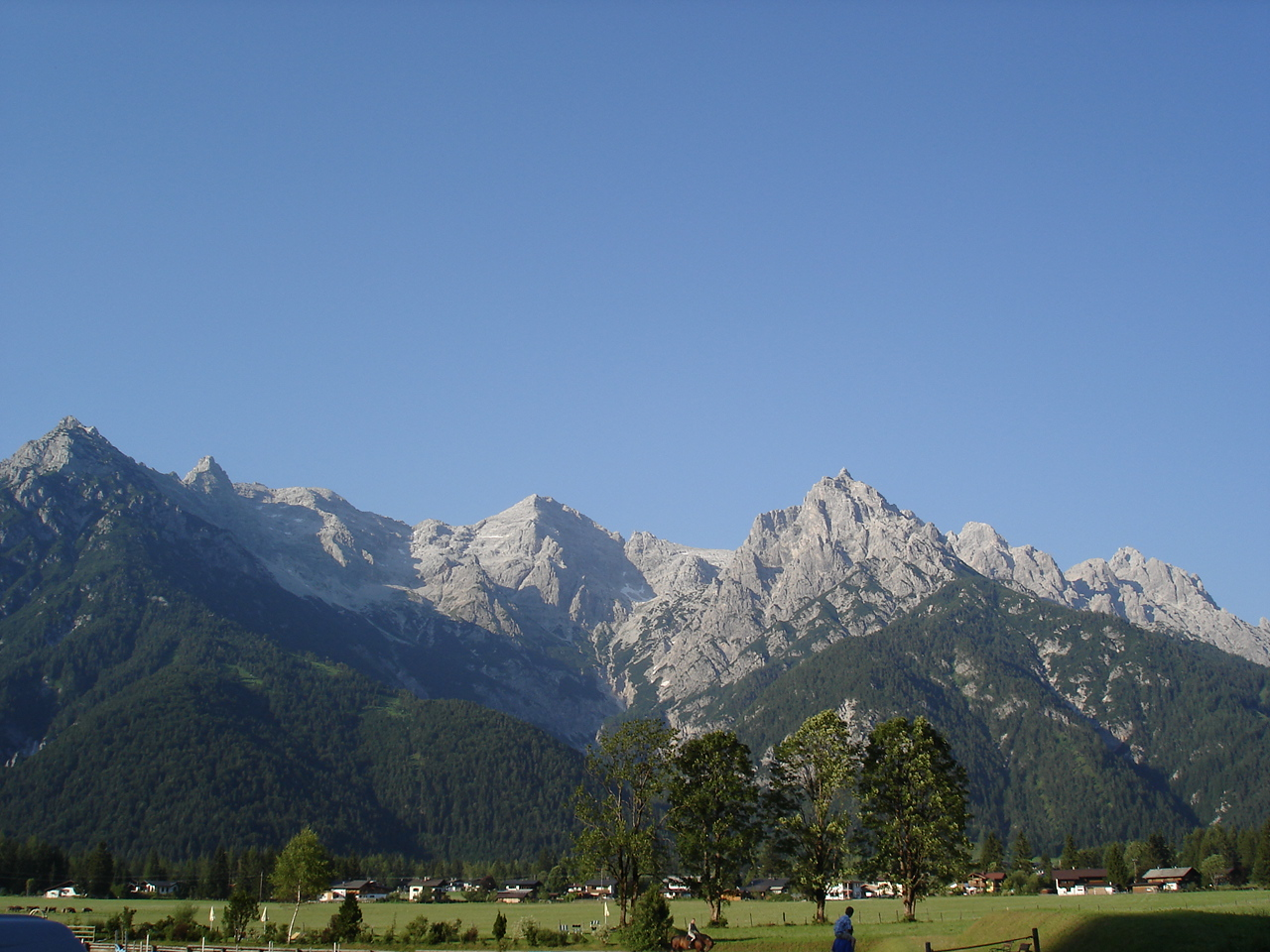
The Lofer Mountains from St. Ulrich am Pillersee

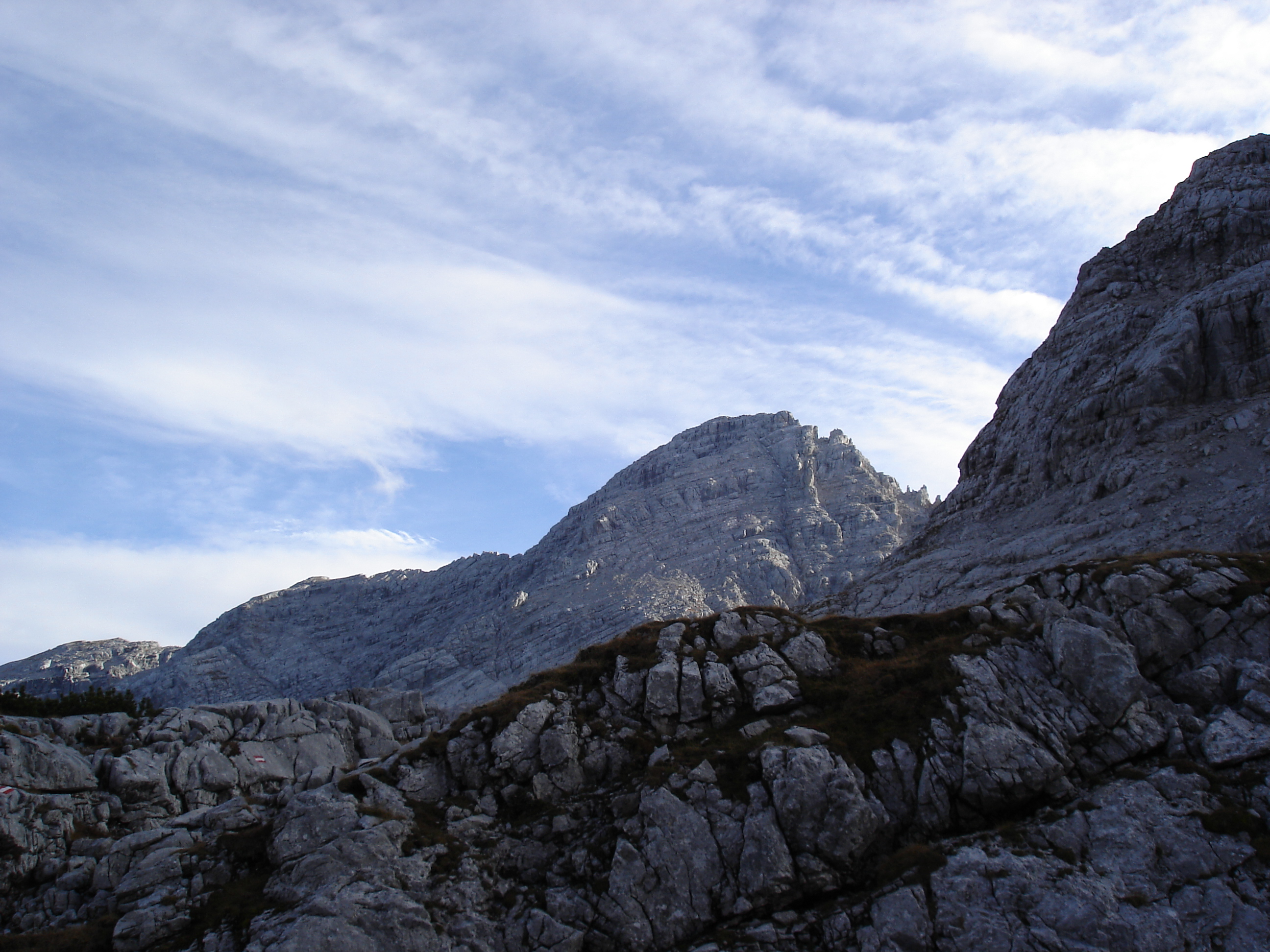
The Großes Ochsenhorn from the Große Wehrgrube

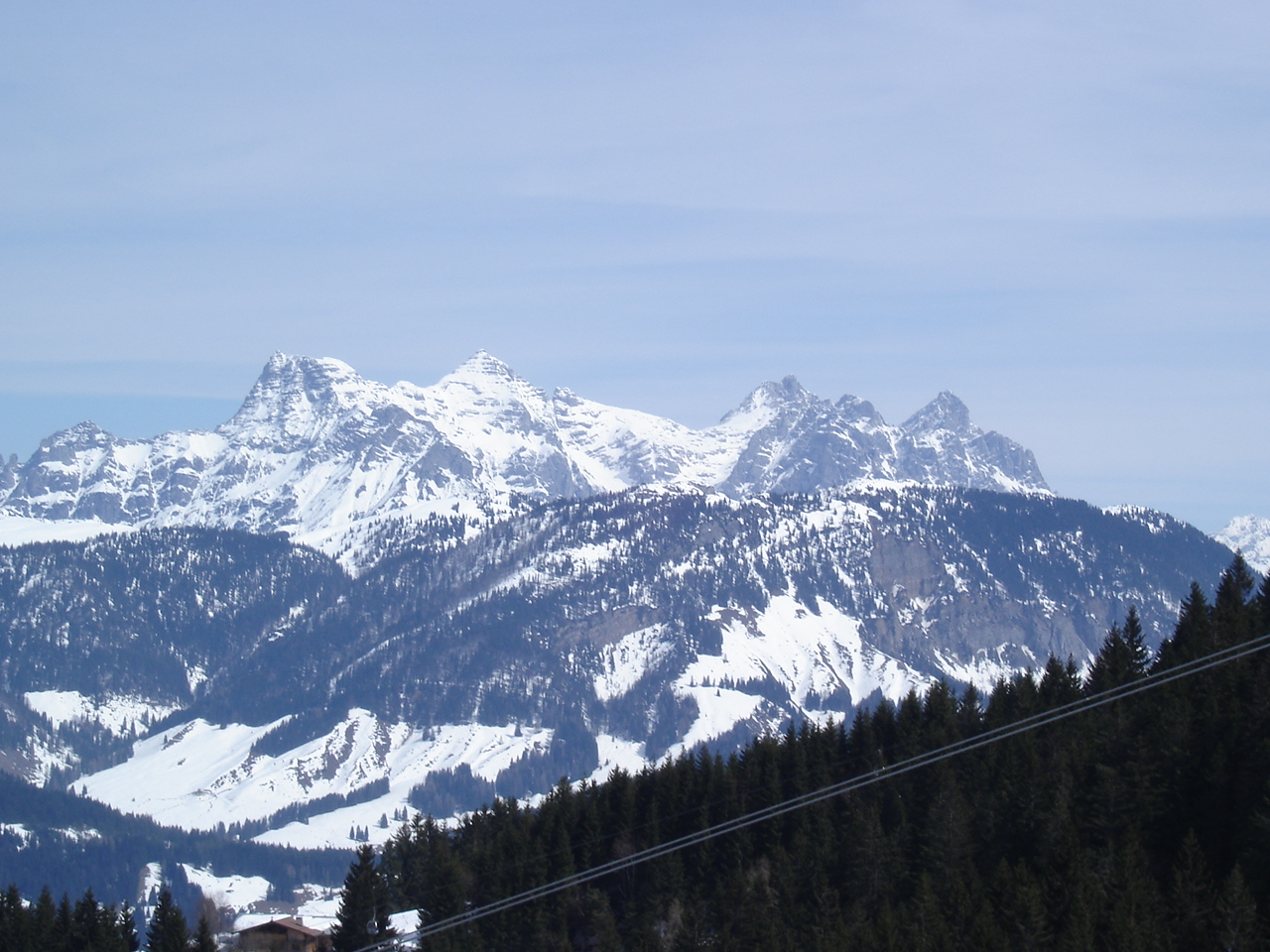
The Lofer Mountains from the southwest

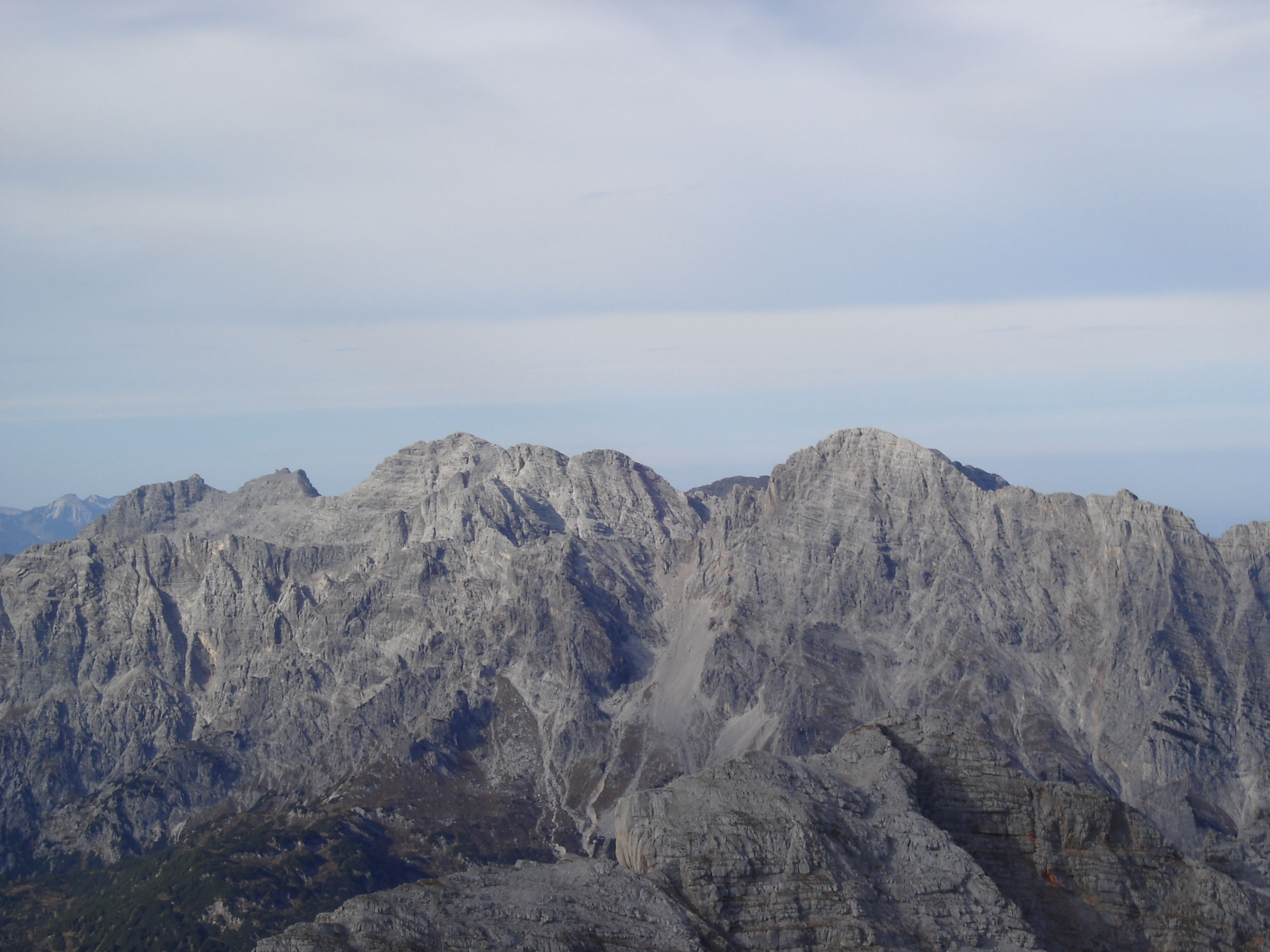
The Lofer Mountains from Birnhorn

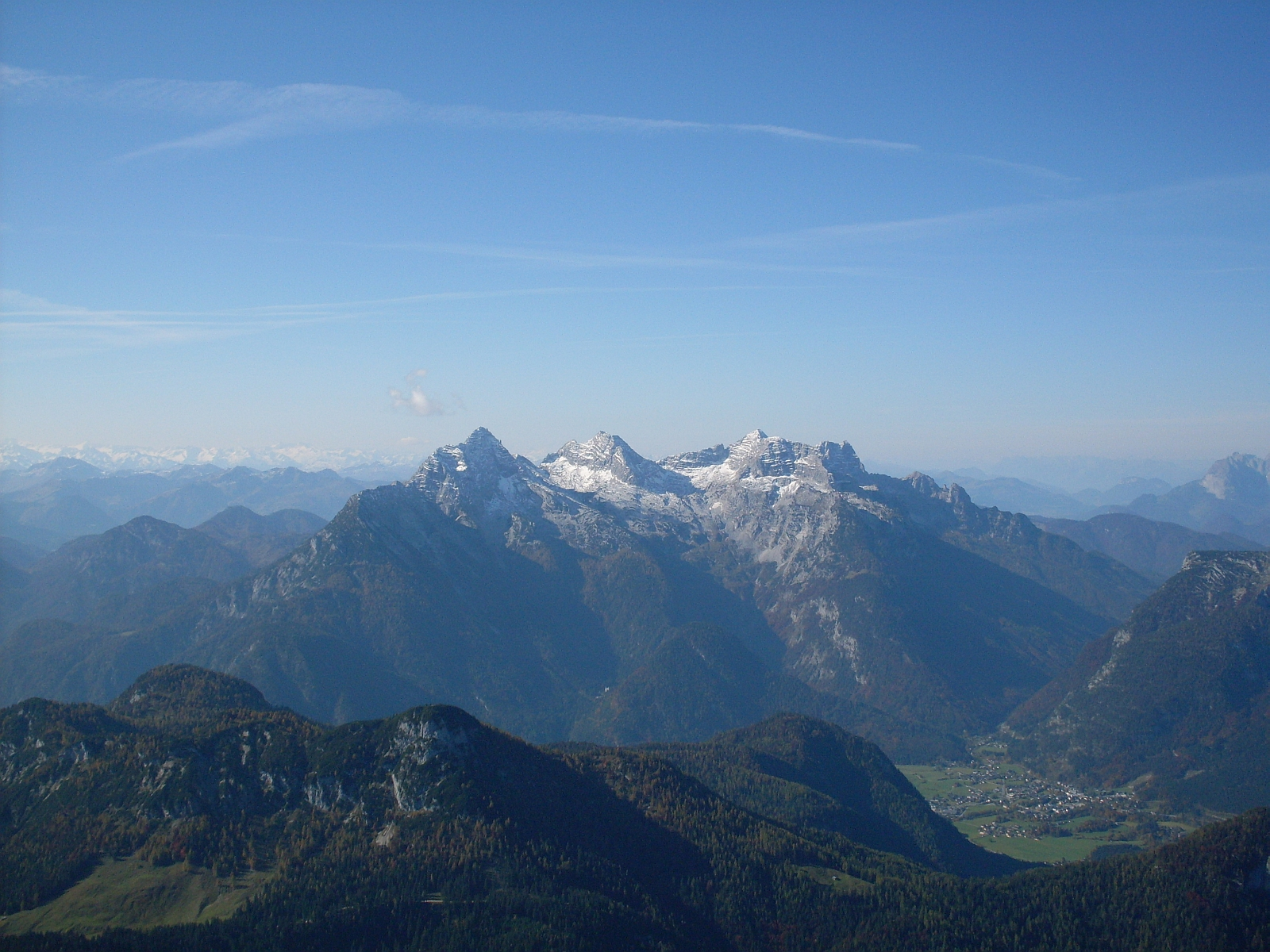
Loferer Steinberge from Gr. Häuselhorn on the Reiter Alm
