= Grießen Pass =

Mountain pass in Salzburg near the border to Tyrol

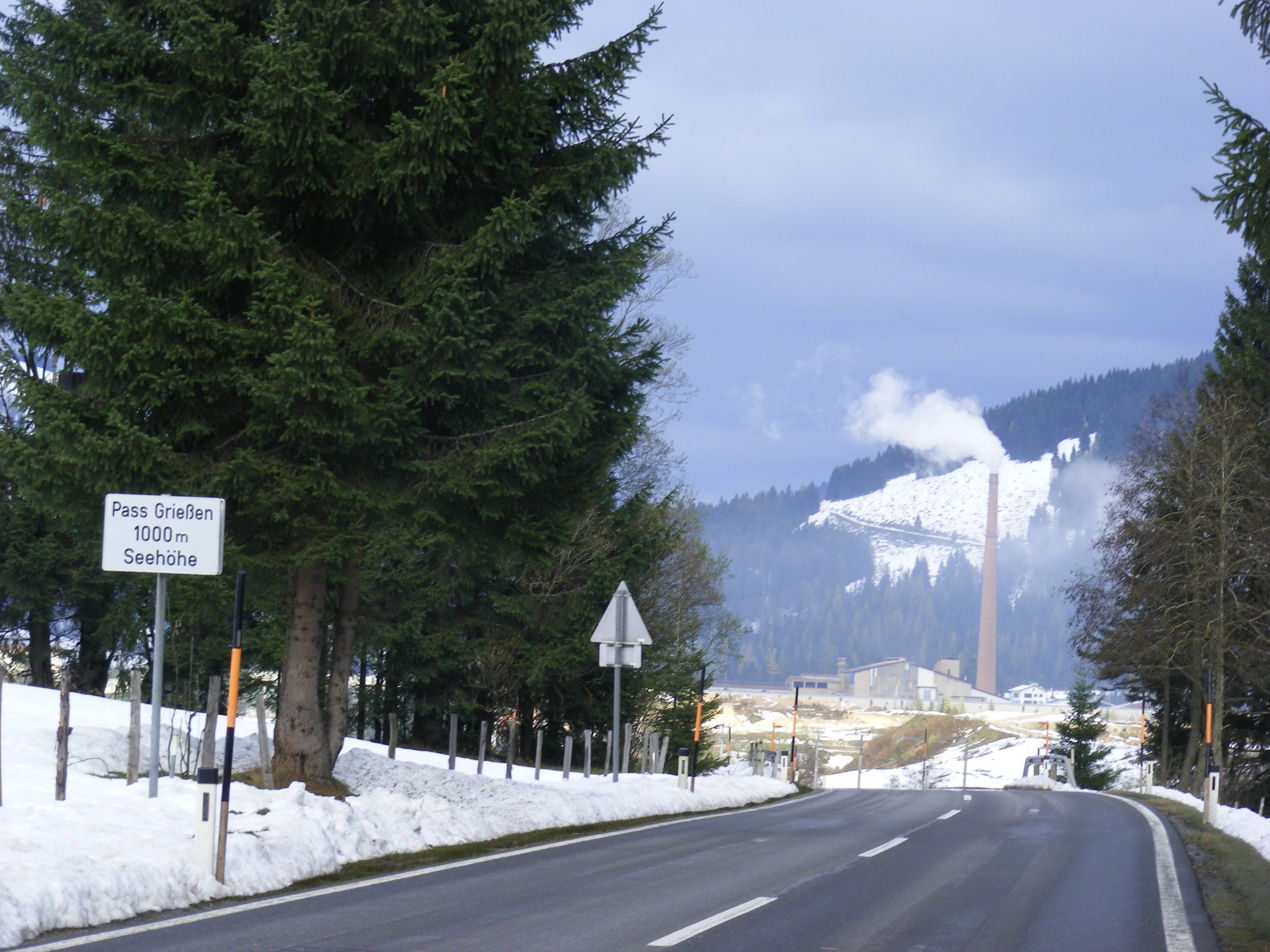
- Grießenpass with incorrect height information

- Location within Alps
- Elevation: 975 metres (3,199 ft)
- Traversed by: Federal Highway B 164

Third Approach
- Location: Austria
- Range: Alps
- Coordinates: 47°27′N 12°28′E

Grießen Pass (el. 975 metres [3,199 ft]) is a high mountain pass in the Austrian Alps between the federal states of Salzburg and Tyrol.

It connects the Kitzbühel Alps and the Leogang Steinberge.

The road over the pass leads from Hochfilzen in Tyrol to Leogang in Salzburg, but it lies almost entirely in the state of Salzburg.

The pass is traversed by the Salzburg-Tyrol Railway and the Hochkönig-Straße (B164).

== See also ==
- List of highest paved roads in Europe
- List of mountain passes
