= Saalach =

River in Germany

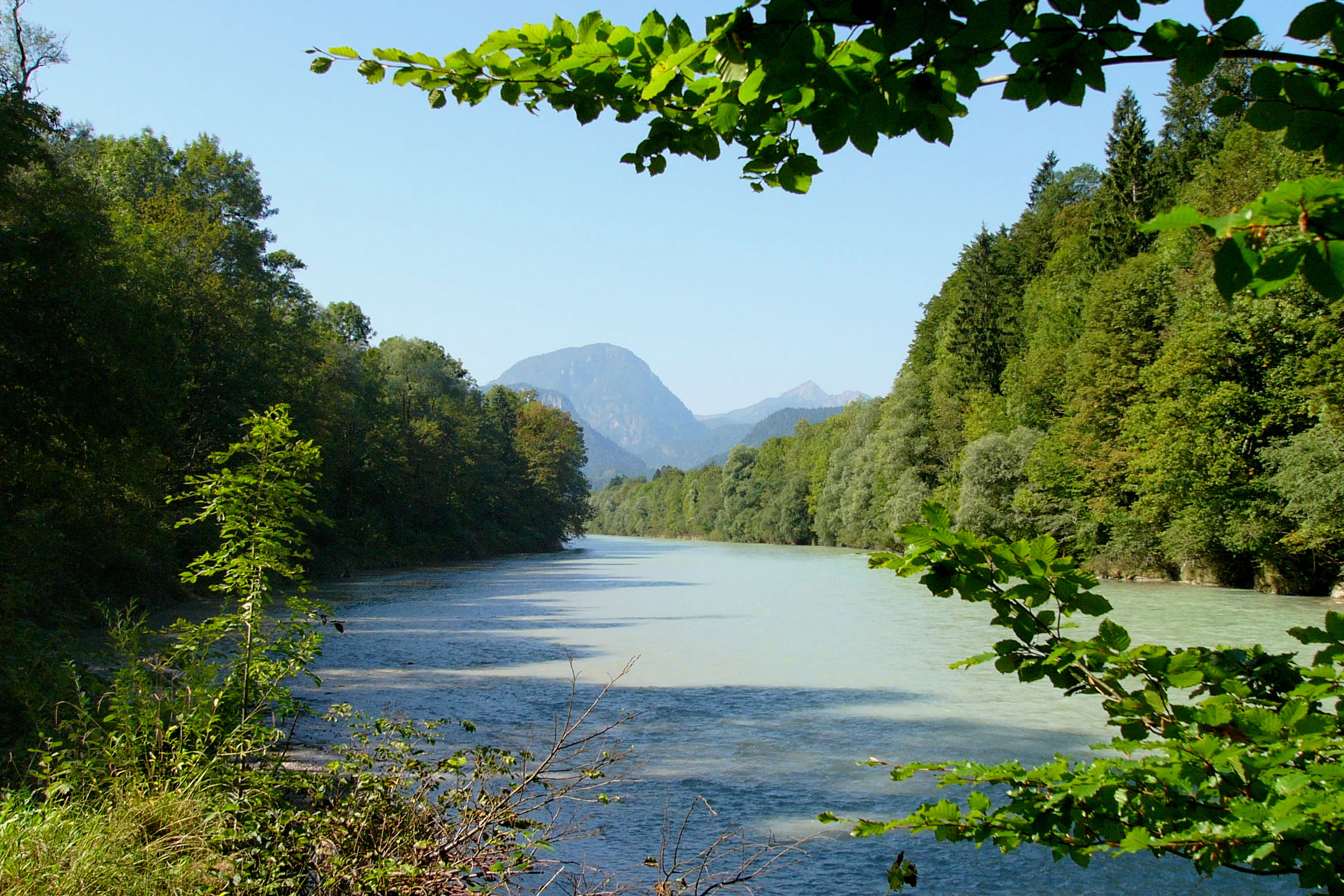
- Saalach near Bad Reichenhall

Location
- Countries: Austria and Germany

Physical characteristics
- Source
  - location: Kitzbühel Alps
  - elevation: 2,178 m (7,146 ft)
- Mouth
  - location: Salzach
  - coordinates: 47°51′13″N 13°0′5″E
- Length: 105.5 km (65.6 mi)
- Basin size: 1,161 km^{2} (448 sq mi)

Basin features
- Progression: Salzach→ Inn→ Danube→ Black Sea

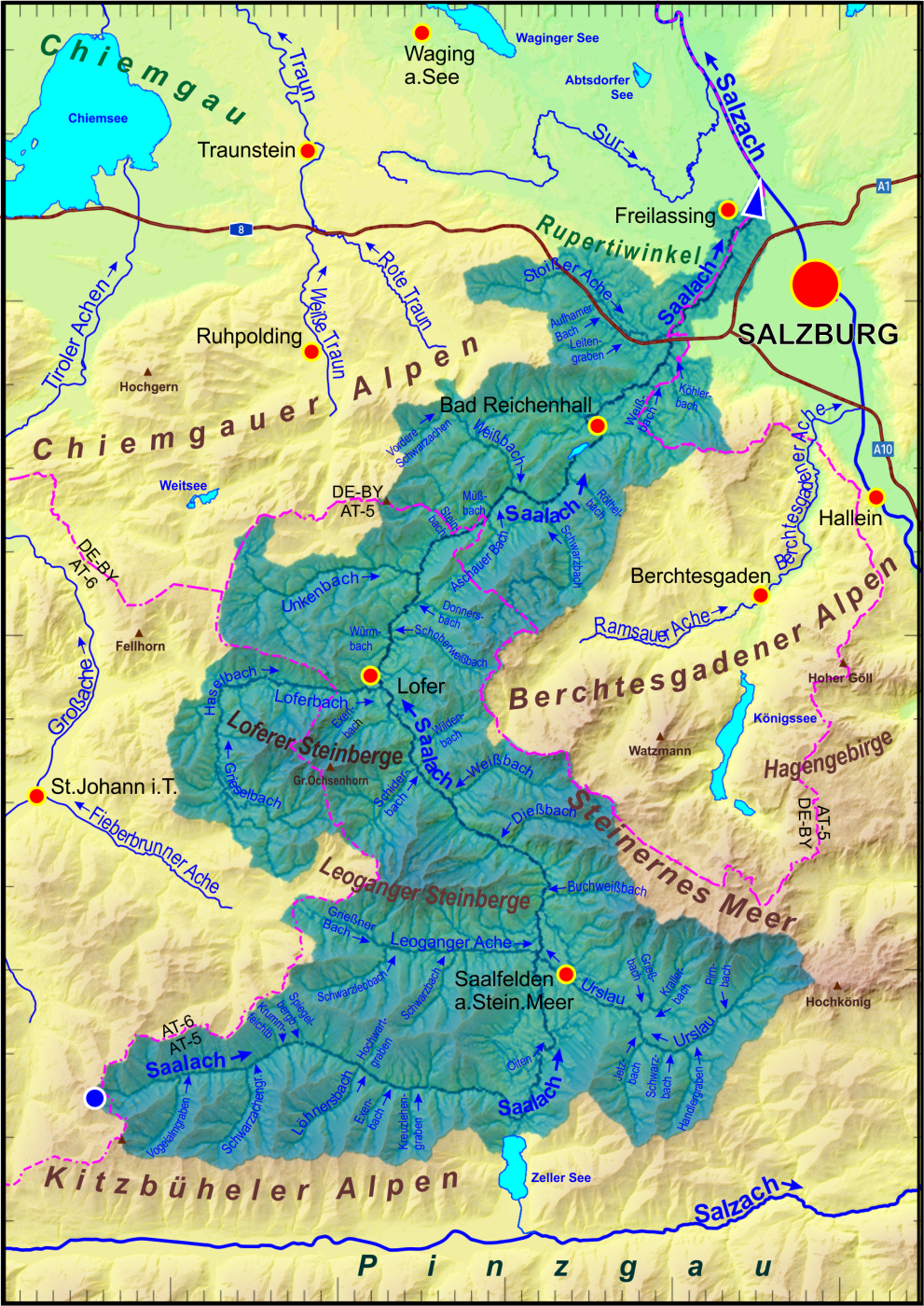
Catchment area of the Saalach

The Saalach (Austrian German pronunciation: [ˈsaːlax]) is a 105-kilometre-long (65 mi) river in Austria and Germany, and a left tributary of the Salzach.

== Course ==
The river begins, as the Saalbach stream, in the Austrian state of Tyrol in the Kitzbühel Alps at the Torsee lake below the 2,178 m (7,146 ft) high Gamshag. From there it flows initially eastwards through the Glemmtal valley, through Hinterglemm, then the ski resort of Saalbach – from that point it is known as the Saalach – until it bends north at Maishofen. It follows the broad valley to Saalfelden, and meanders further on through the narrow valley between the Leoganger and Loferer Steinberge and the Steinernes Meer to Lofer in north-western direction. There it enters a narrow gorge, famous for its white water rafting. Crossing the border to Bavaria (Germany) at Melleck (part of Schneizlreuth) it flows along the northern slopes of the Reiter Alpe known for its climbing routes. A short distance before Bad Reichenhall, a dam of a hydro-electrical power plant collects the waters of the Saalachsee. The power plant provides the energy for the railway line Salzburg, Freilassing, Bad Reichenhall to Berchtesgaden. Having passed Staufeneck, the Saalach leaves the mountains and enters the flat forests called Saalachau. From Piding on north-eastwards, the Austria–Germany border follows the river for some 10 km (6 mi) to Freilassing, at which it merges with the river Salzach.

The name has its origin from Saal, an old form of Salz (salt), and Ach which denotes a small river.
