= Saalfelden =

Saalfelden am Steinernen Meer
- Municipality
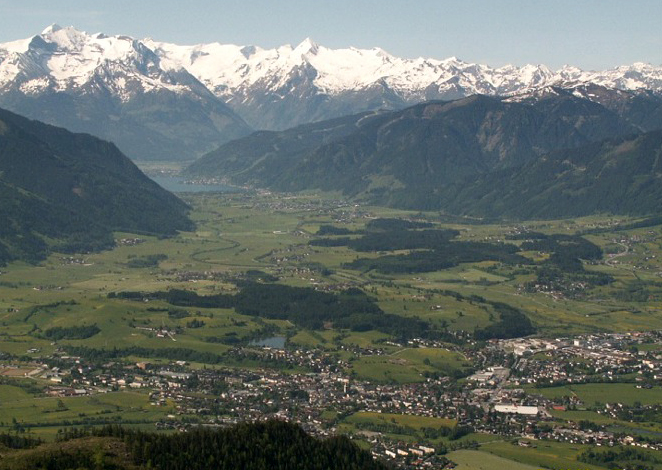
- Saalfelden Basin

- Coat of arms

- Location within Austria
- Coordinates: 47°25′37″N 12°50′54″E
- Country: Austria
- State: Salzburg
- District: Zell am See

Government
  - Mayor: Erich Rohrmoser (SPÖ)

Area
  - Total: 118.35 km^{2} (45.70 sq mi)
- Elevation: 748 m (2,454 ft)

Population (2018-01-01)
  - Total: 16,700
  - Density: 141/km^{2} (365/sq mi)
- Time zone: UTC+1 (CET)
  - Summer (DST): UTC+2 (CEST)
- Postal code: 5760
- Area code: 06582
- Vehicle registration: ZE
- Website: www.saalfelden.at

Saalfelden am Steinernen Meer is a town in the district of Zell am See in the Austrian state of Salzburg. With approximately 16,000 inhabitants, Saalfelden is the district's largest town and the third of the federal state after Salzburg and Hallein.

== Geography ==
Although the Saalfelden area has always been the most populous of the historic Pinzgau region, the seat of the district administration is situated in the neighbouring town of Zell am See.

=== Saalfelden Basin ===
Saalfelden am Steinernen Meer lies at 744 m (2,441 ft) above sea level and its municipal area covers 118 km^{2} (46 mi^{2}). The largest proportion of the municipality is formed by the Saalfelden Basin (Saalfeldner Becken) situated between the Northern Limestone Alps ranges of:

- the Steinernes Meer high plateau to the north, forming the border with Germany
- the Leogang Mountains and the Biberg to the west
- the Hochkönig massif and the Salzburg Slate Alps to the east.

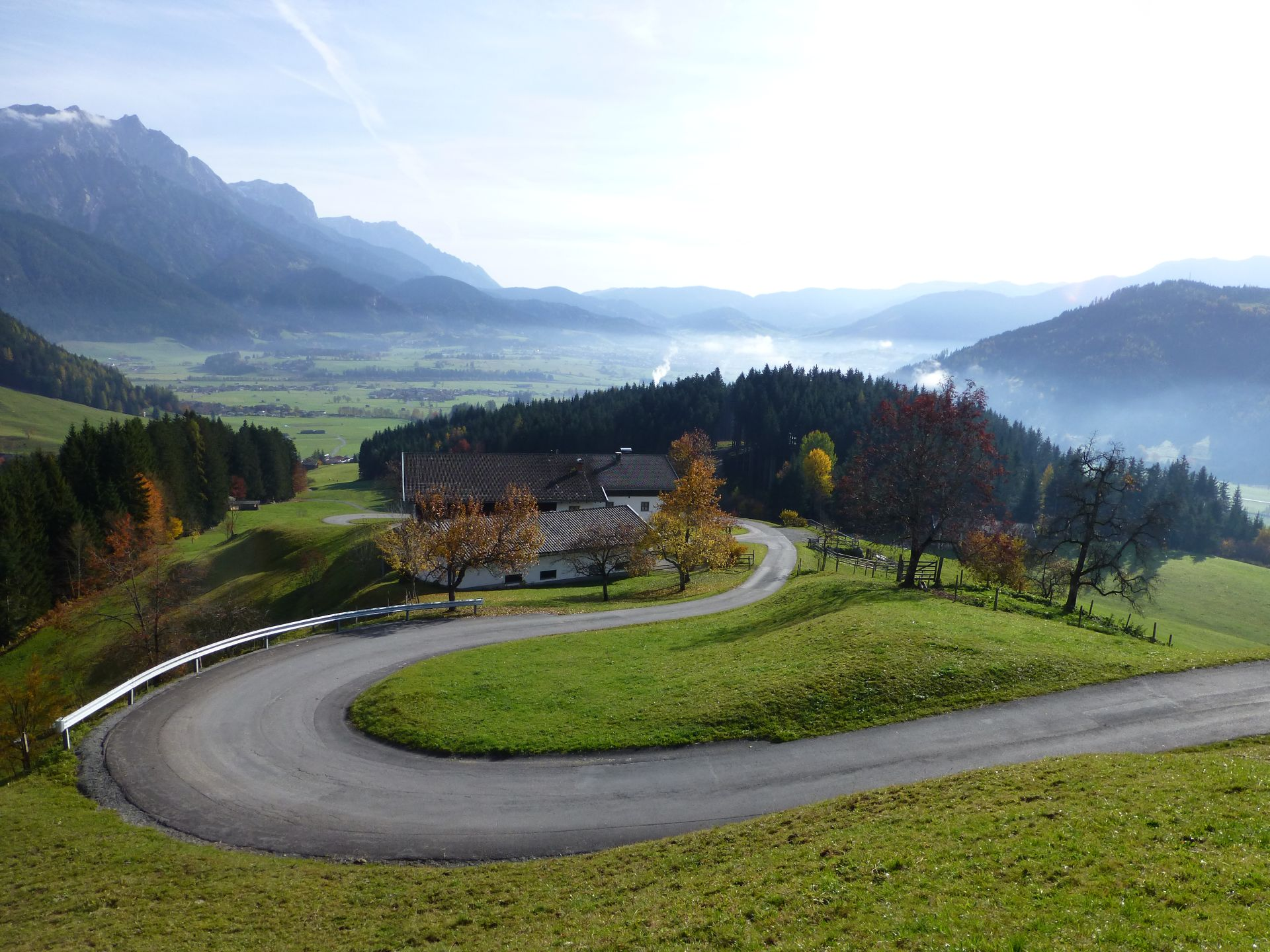
View over Saalfelden Basin

To the south the basin is generally open, running into the Zell Basin (Zeller Becken) with Lake Zell and the Salzach river – hence the term Zell-Saalfelden Basin Zeller-Saalfeldener Becken is also used for the whole valley – and enables a view of the High Tauern, especially the prominent Kitzsteinhorn and Wiesbachhorn peaks. The two basins are separated by a barely discernible valley floor divide. This trough is one of the largest inner-Alpine basins.

The main river in the basin is the Saalach. It rises in the upper Glemm Valley, empties into the basin south of Saalfelden and passes through it from south to north. A right tributary of the Saalach flowing through the borough of Saalfelden from east to west is the Urslau creek. A left tributary, the Leoganger Ache, empties into the Saalach from the west. In addition there are several smaller tributary streams. In the centre of the basin is the Kühbühel ("cow-hill") which is a good 100 m (330 ft).

The only lake in the expansive basin is the man-made Ritzensee, excavated for leisure purposes. Other artificial ponds have been laid out primarily for angling and tourism.

=== Subdivisions ===
The Saalfelden municipality comprises the cadastral communities of Bergham, Farmach, Gerling, Haid, Hohlwegen, Lenzing, Lichtenberg, and Saalfelden proper.

== History ==
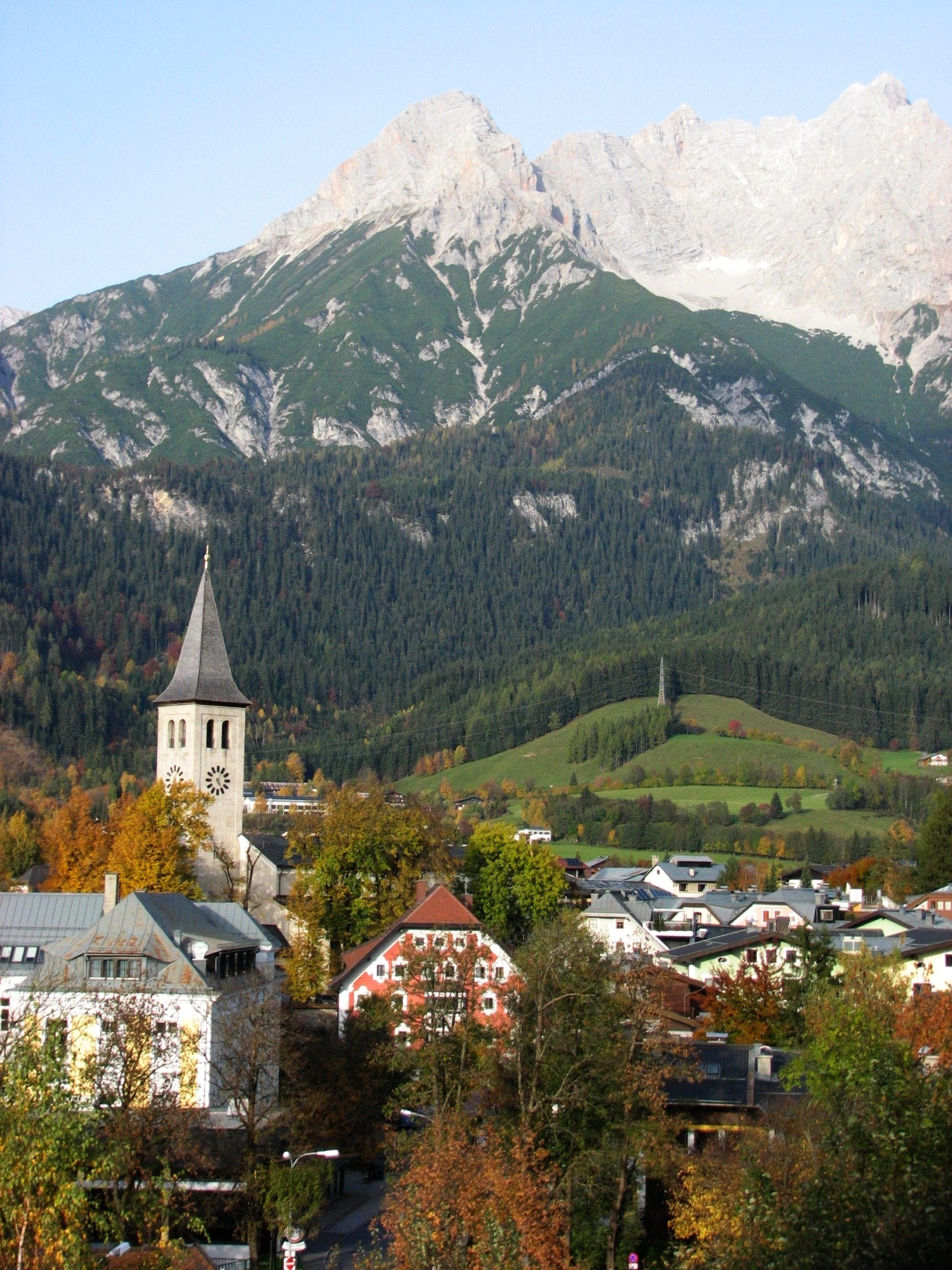
Town centre with parish church in October 2008.

Early archaeological findings in the Saalfelden Basin date back to the Neolithic Era. A continuous settlement is documented since the late Iron Age, when Celtic tribes moved into the region. From the 7th century AD onwards, Bavarians settled the area from the north. About 100 years later the estates of Salvet on the Saalach river were first mentioned in a register by the Bishops of Salzburg. While they became part of the Carolingian Empire, the lands were incorporated into the Frankish Pinzgau county.

The Saalfelden estates were acquired by Archbishop Hartwig of Salzburg about 1000; and by the early 13th century, the whole Pinzgau region was part of the prince-bishops' lands. Saalfelden was first mentioned as a market town in the mid 14th century. It remained part of the Salzburg prince-archbishopric until its secularisation in 1803.

With the Salzburg lands, Saalfelden finally fell to the Austrian Empire in 1816. It achieved town status in 2000.

Largest groups of foreign residents
Nationality	Population (2025)
Germany	620
Bosnia and Herzegovina	474
Hungary	423
Croatia	393
Turkey	260
Syria	180
Romania	117
Serbia	84
Poland	81
Slovakia	77
Ukraine	59
Bulgaria	55
Italy	53
Czech Republic	46
Slovenia	40
Iraq	13

== Sport and leisure ==
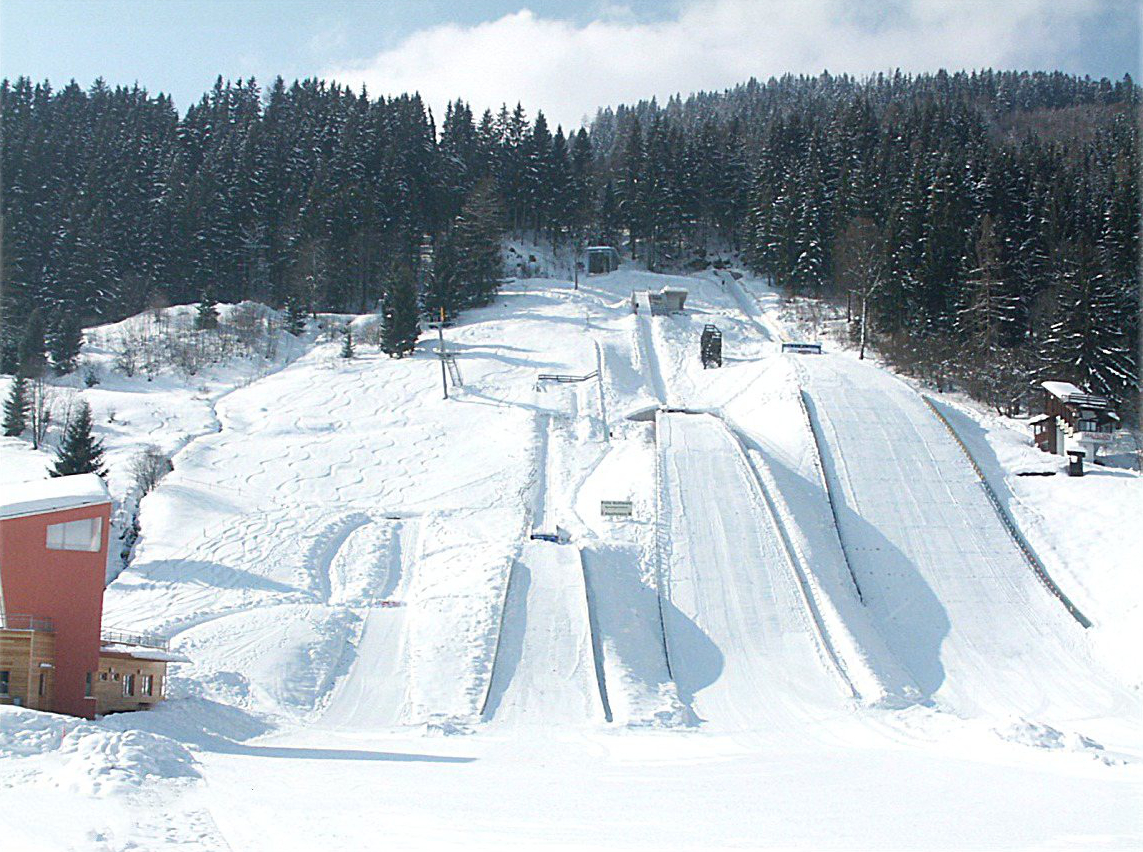
Felix Gottwald Ski Jumping Stadium

The Ritzensee and the adjacent Kollingwald forest are the recreation areas for Saalfelden's townsfolk. The lake is used in summer as a bathing lake and in winter for ice skating.

Footpaths and trails are used in winter as cross country skiing routes. In the village of Uttenhofen there several ski jumps including those of the Felix Gottwald Ski Jumping Stadium and a centre for Nordic combination. Saalfelden earned fame in the langlauf and biathlon sports through its top athletes: Felix Gottwald, Simon Eder, Julian Eberhard and Tobias Eberhard.

Since 2006 an international triathlon competition has taken place annually in Saalfelden in August, the Tri Motion Austria.

== Notable people ==
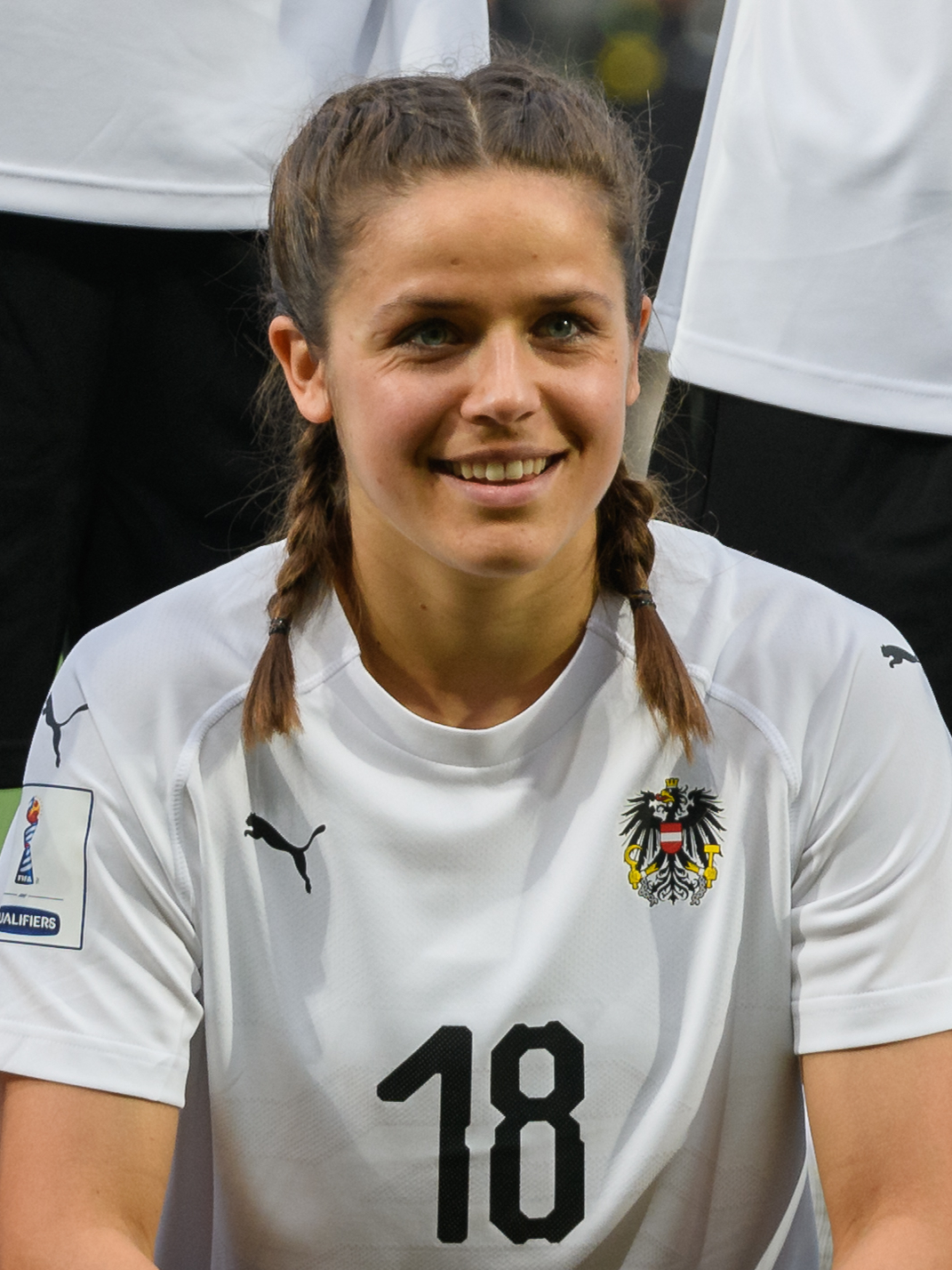
Laura Feiersinger, 2018

- Rosl Schwaiger (1918–1970), operatic coloratura soprano

=== Sport ===
- Wolfgang Feiersinger (born 1965) footballer, played 430 games and 46 for Austria national football team
- Gerhard Fellner (born 1970), football player and coach; played over 340 games
- Franz Zorn (born 1970) speedway rider; Ice Speedway European Champion, 2008
- Reinhard Schwarzenberger (born 1977) ski jumper, team bronze medallist at the 1998 Winter Olympics
- Thomas Hörl (born 1981), ski jumper, world record holder in March 2000
- Stefan Schwab (born 1990), football player, played over 410 games
- Laura Feiersinger (born 1993), footballer, played over 100 games for Austria women's national football team
