= Salzburg Slate Alps =

Austrian mountain range in Salzburg

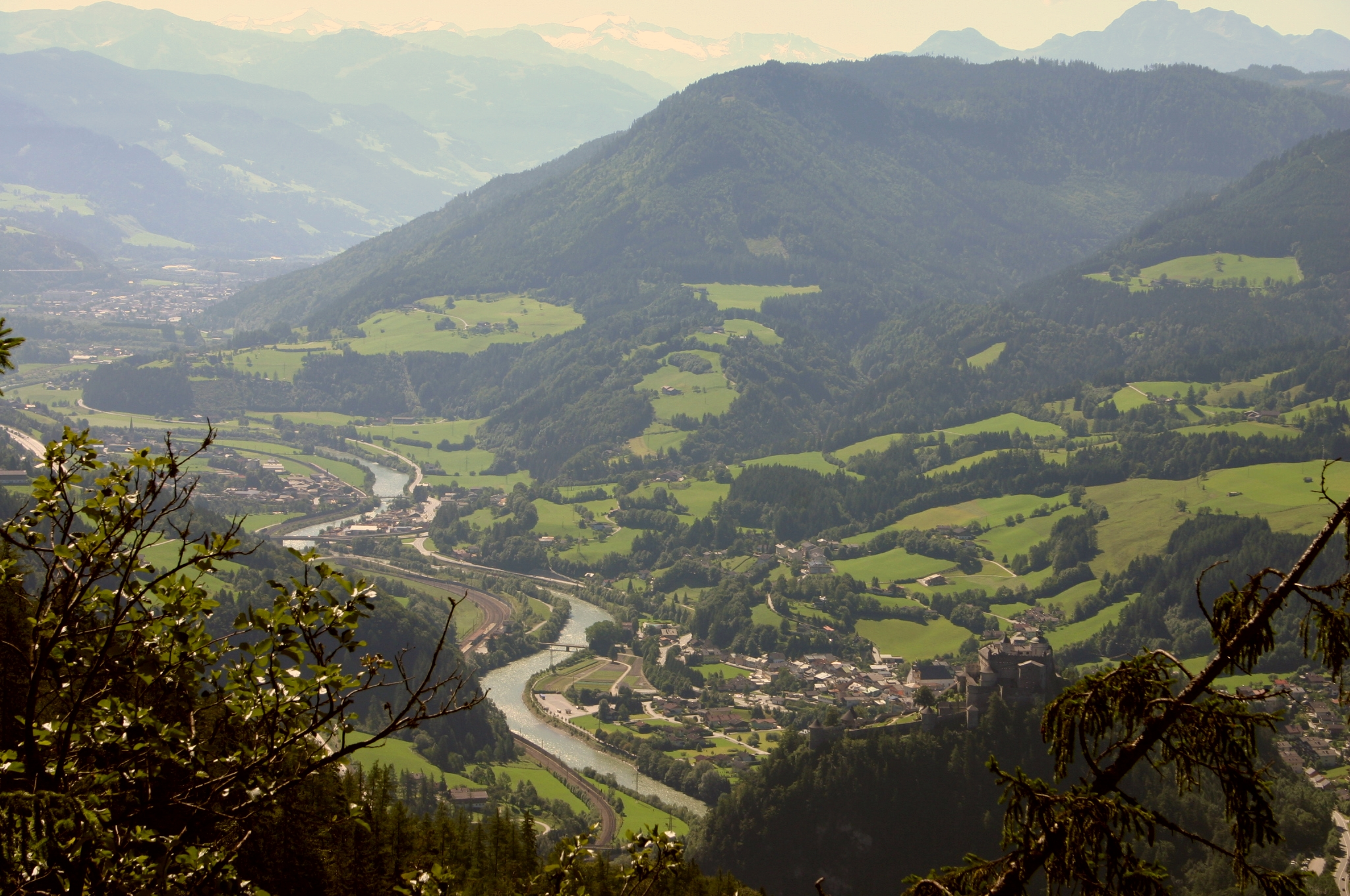
- Salzach valley with Burg Hohenwerfen

Highest point
- Peak: Hundstein
- Elevation: 2,117 m (6,946 ft)
- Coordinates: 47°20′17″N 12°54′40″E

Dimensions
- Length: 60 km (37 mi)
- Width: 10 km (6.2 mi)

Geography
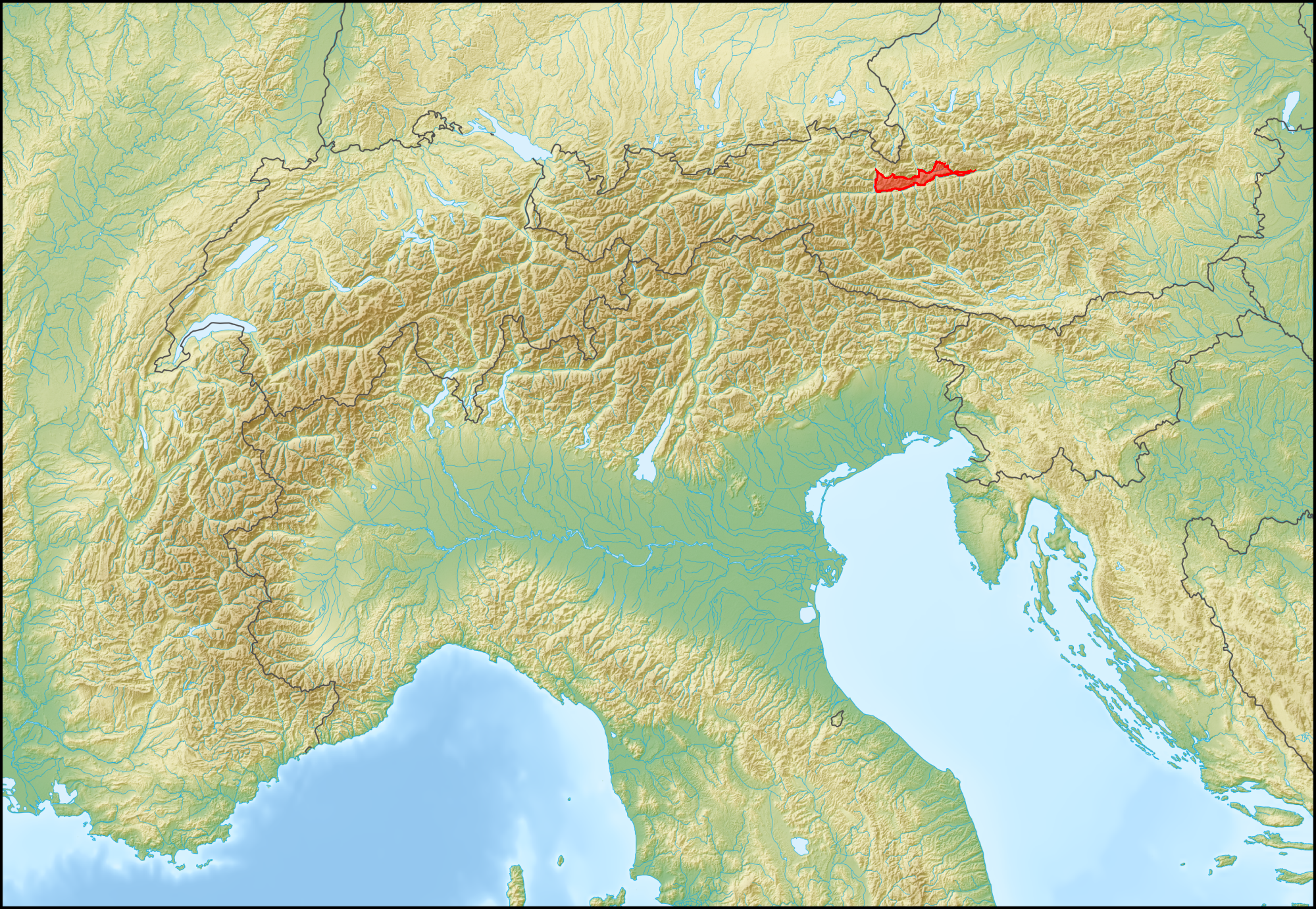
- Salzburg Slate Alps (in red) within the Alps. Borders of the range according to the Alpine Club classification of the Eastern Alps
- Country: Austria
- State: Salzburg
- Range coordinates: 47°23′N 13°13′E
- Parent range: Northern Limestone Alps

Geology
- Rock age: Paleozoic-Early Triassic
- Rock type: Greywacke zone/Werfen Formation

The Salzburg Slate Alps (German: Salzburger Schieferalpen) are a mountain range of the Eastern Alps, in the Austrian state of Salzburg. Situated within the greywacke zone, they could be regarded either as part of the Northern Limestone Alps or of the Central Eastern Alps.

== Geography ==
The range is located between the Kitzbühel Alps (Tyrolean Slate Alps), the continuation of the greywacke zone beyond Lake Zell and Saalach river in the west, and the Dachstein massif in the east. In the north it is adjacent to the Berchtesgaden Alps, while in the south the Salzach and Enns valleys separates it from the High and Low Tauern ranges of the Alpine crest. The Salzburg Slate Alps stretch about 60 kilometres (37 mi) in west–east direction, from the Salzburg Pinzgau region, north of the Salzach, into the Pongau region and along the Enns river up to the border with Styria.

This inner-Alpine Mittelgebirge group, designated by the Alpine Club Classification of the Eastern Alps (AVE) based on its underlying rock, cannot be assigned from a geological perspective either to the Northern or the Central Alps, so it does not fit into the general tripartite division of the Eastern Alps and, as a result, is variously treated in the literature.

== Subdivisions ==
From a topographic perspective there are two subgroups, separated by the Salzach river where it bends northwards near St Johann im Pongau:

- the Dienten Mountains (Dientener Berge), which are known in the region as slate mountains in the true sense, running from west of the Salzach to Lake Zell and including the Hundstein massif (2,117 m (AA)) and the Schneeberg-Hochglockner Group (Schneeberg-Hochglockner-Gruppe, (Schneebergkreuz 1,938 m above sea level (AA))
- the Fritztal Mountains (Fritztaler Berge), running from east of the Salzach to the Styrian border and the Dachstein massif, including the:
  - Hochgründeck (1,821 m above sea level (AA)) in the triangle formed by Bischofshofen, St. Johann and Altenmarkt;
  - Rossbrand (1,770 m above sea level (AA)), which runs from Altenmarkt to the Mandling Pass near Radstadt;
  - Glutserberg, Halserberg and the Ramsauerleiten, three smaller regions that continue the Rossbrand to Schladming;
  - Gerzkopf (1,728 m above sea level (AA)), north of the Fritztal valley, which geologically belongs to the limestone region between the Tennen Mountains and the Dachstein, and are morphologically less related to the Dachstein massif and more to its southwestern outlier
