= Leogang Mountains =

Mountain range in Austria

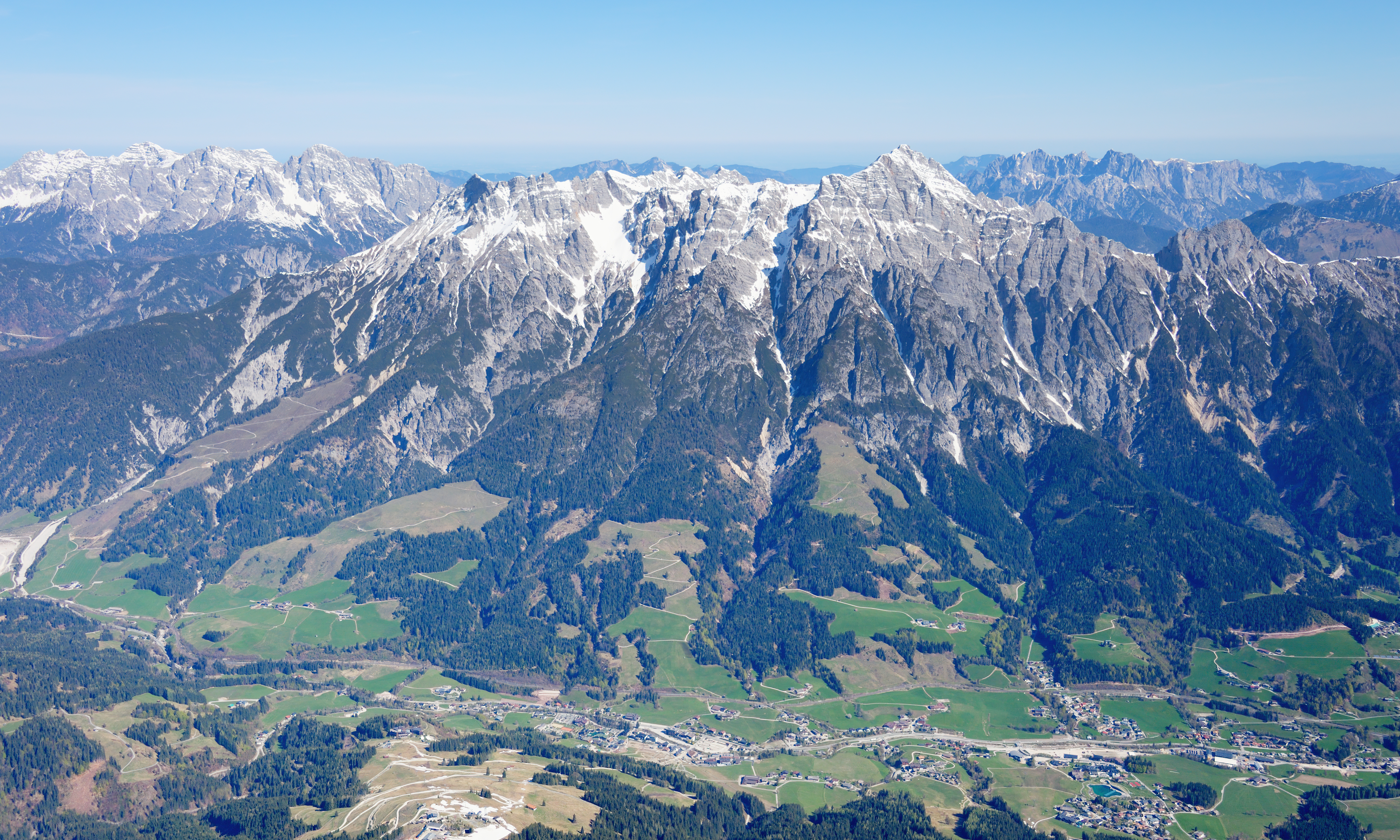

Highest point
- Peak: Birnhorn
- Elevation: 2,634 m (8,642 ft)

Geography
- Country: Austria
- States: Salzburg and Tyrol
- Range coordinates: 47°28′29″N 12°44′1″E
- Parent range: Northern Limestone Alps

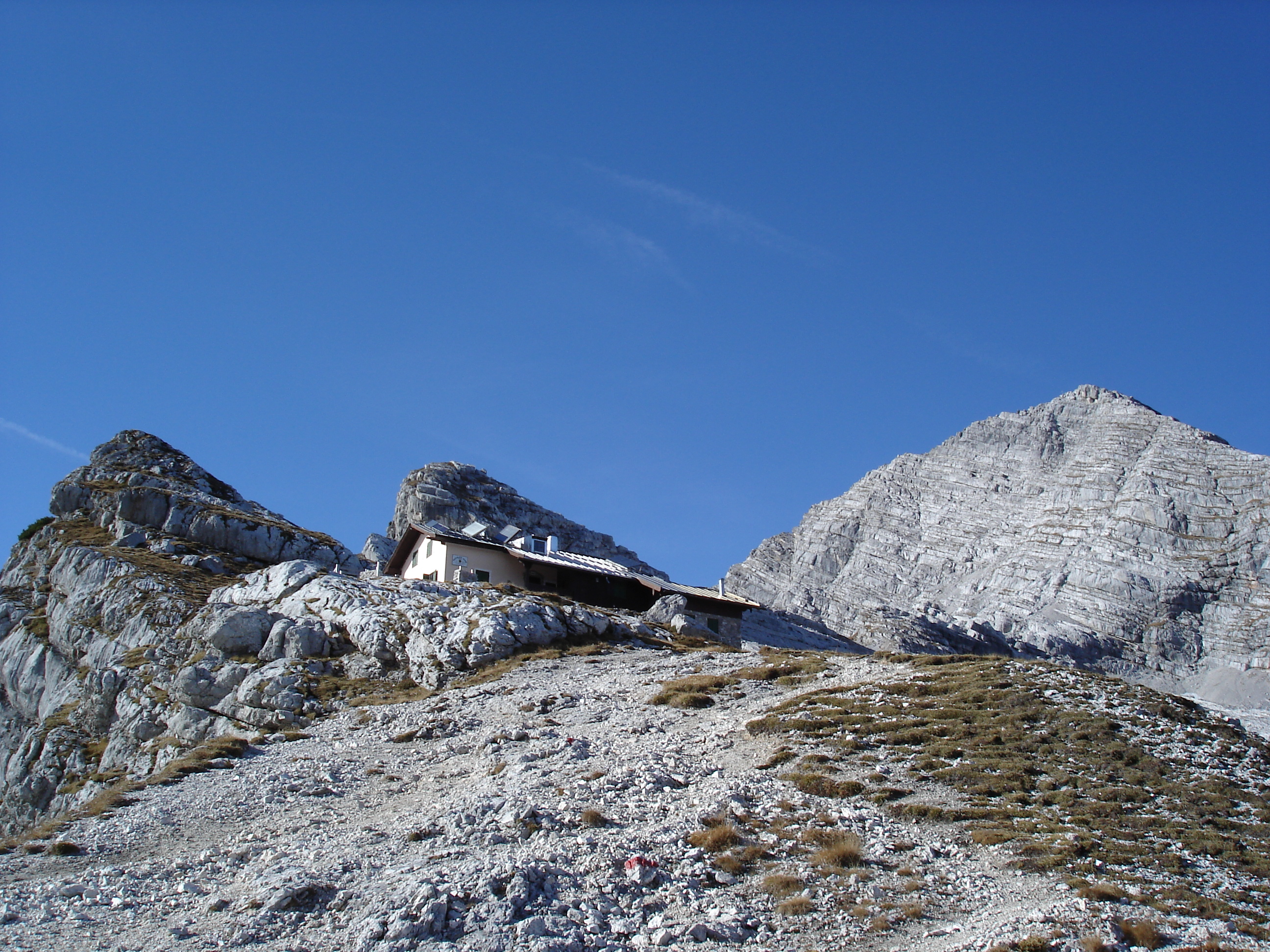
The Passauer Hut and Birnhorn in late autumn

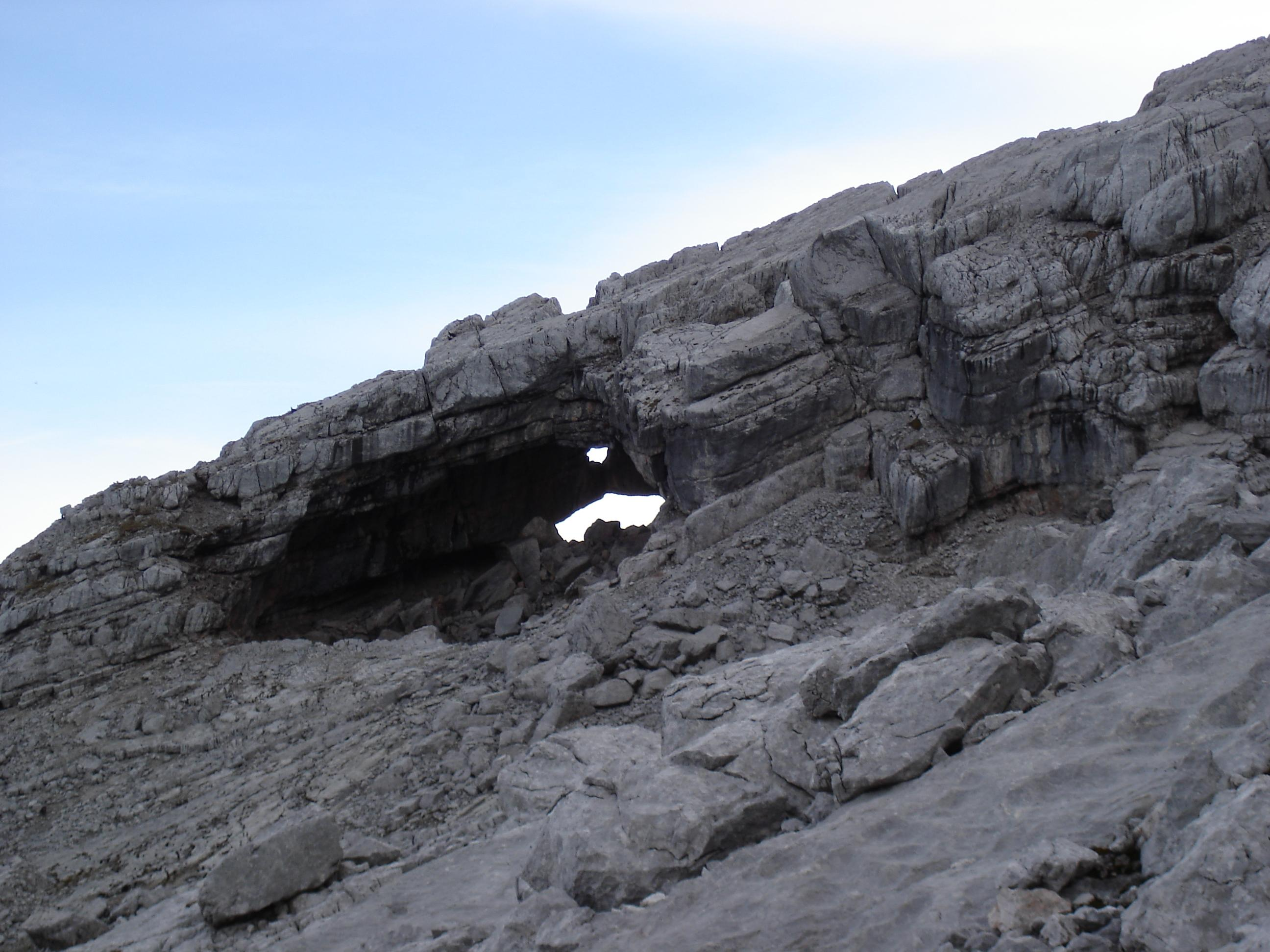
Melkerloch from the Hochgrub

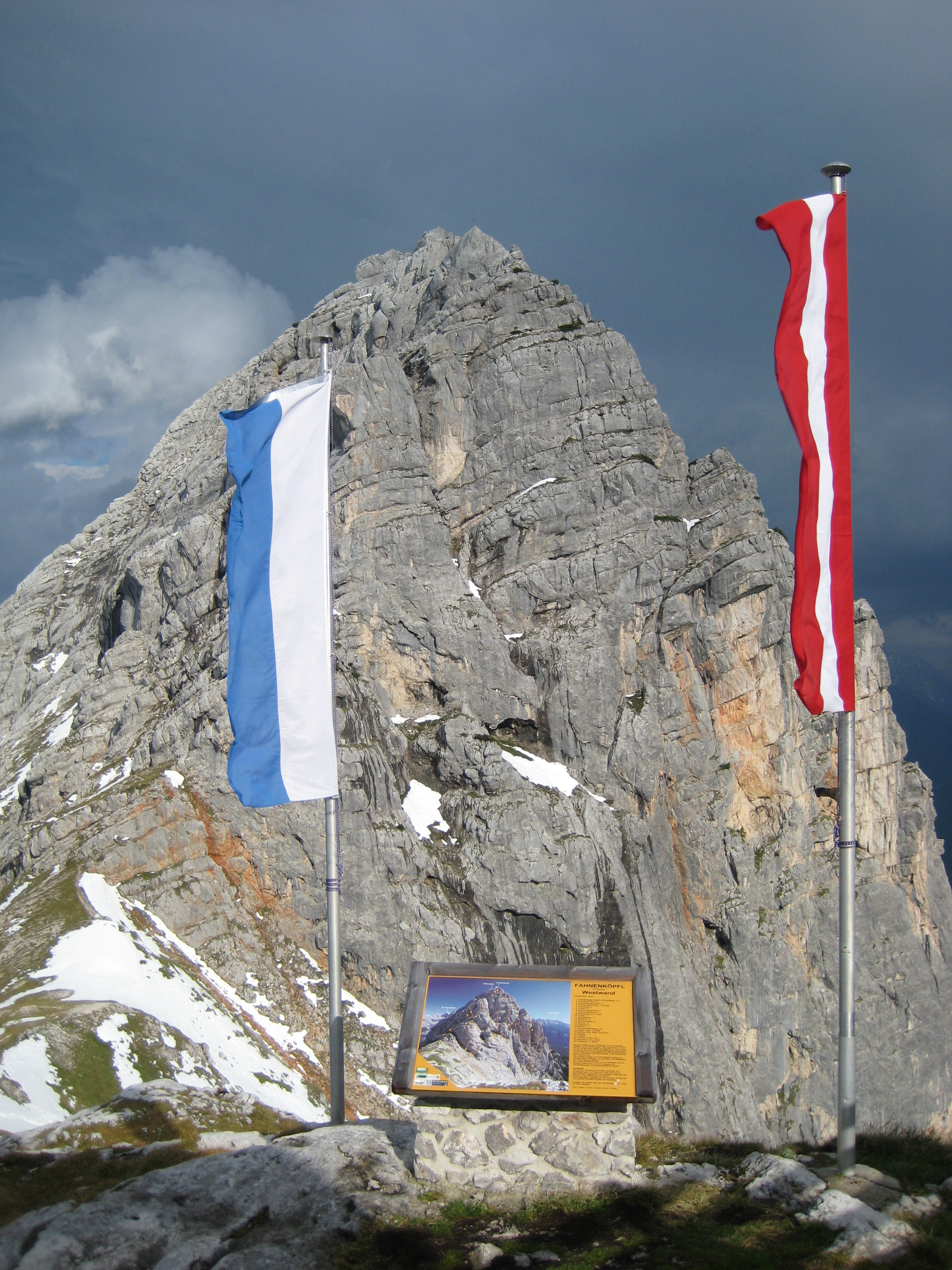
View from the Passauer Hut of the Fahnenköpfl

The Leogang Mountains (German: Leoganger Steinberge, lit. "Leogang Rock Mountains") are a mountain range in Austria in the state of Salzburg and form part of the Northern Limestone Alps within the Eastern Alps. They are located between the Lofer valley, Saalfelden and Leogang and, together with the Lofer Mountains to the northwest, form two mountain massifs that are separated by the saddle of the Römersattel (1,202 m), but which the Alpine categorisation of the Eastern Alps defines as a single sub-group (the Lofer and Leogang Mountains). The Leogang Mountains are separated from the Kitzbühel Alps to the south and the Steinernes Meer to the east by deeply incised valleys. Typical of the Steinberge are high plateaux with steep sides and sharply undulating high cirques.

As typical karst mountains the Leogang Mountains are also pierced by numerous caves. The most famous of these is the Lamprechtsofen, over 50 km long, located immediately next to the federal road between Lofer and Saalfelden. A prominent rock formation is the Melkerloch in the southeastern face of the Birnhorn mountain.

At 2,634 metres (8,642 ft) the Birnhorn is the highest peak in the range. The Hochfilzen Military Training Area used by the Austrian Army lies in the west of the Leoganger Steinberge.

== Neighbouring ranges ==
The Leogang Mountains border on the following mountain groups in the Alps:

- Lofer Mountains to the northwest
- Berchtesgaden Alps to the east
- Salzburg Slate Alps to the southeast
- Kitzbühel Alps to the south
- Kaiser Mountains to the west

== Peaks ==
- Birnhorn: 2,634 m above sea level (AA)
- Kuchelhorn: 2,500 m above sea level (AA)
- Passauerkopf: 2,465 m above sea level (AA)
- Grießener Hochbrett: 2,467 m above sea level (AA)
- Signalkopf: 2,462 m above sea level (AA)
- Großes Rothorn: 2,442 m above sea level (AA)
- Dürrkarhorn: 2,280 m above sea level (AA)
- Hochzint: 2,243 m above sea level (AA)
- Mitterhorn: 2,206 m above sea level (AA)
- Fahnenköpfl: 2,142 m above sea level (AA)
- Brandhorn: 2,099 m above sea level (AA)

== Tourism ==
=== Alpine Club huts ===
In the Leogang Mountains there are only two mountain huts. They belong to the DAV - Deutscher Alpenverein - German Alpine Club but are operated by local Austrians. The DAV operates a Recripical Rights system so that OEVA - Austrian Alpine Club member discounts, were applicable, can be enjoyed.

- Lamprechtsofen-Höhlengaststätte: Height: 664 m above sea level (AA), only opened during the day in summer and winter, 6 mattress bunks, next to the Bundesstraße from Lofer to Saalfelden
- Passauer Hut: Height: 2,033 m above sea level (AA), open in summer from mid-June to end of September, 45 mattress bunks, winter accommodation with 6 bedspaces, Valley destinations: Leogang, walking time: 2.75 hours.

=== Mountain huts ===
- Lettlkaser: height: 1,441 m above sea level (AA), open in summer, no winter accommodation, no bedspaces, Valley destinations: Pernerwinkel-Gerstboden (2h walk), Wiesersberg-Gerstboden (2.5h walk), Leogang (2h walk), Mitterbrand (1.5h walk)
