= Dienten am Hochkönig =

- Municipality
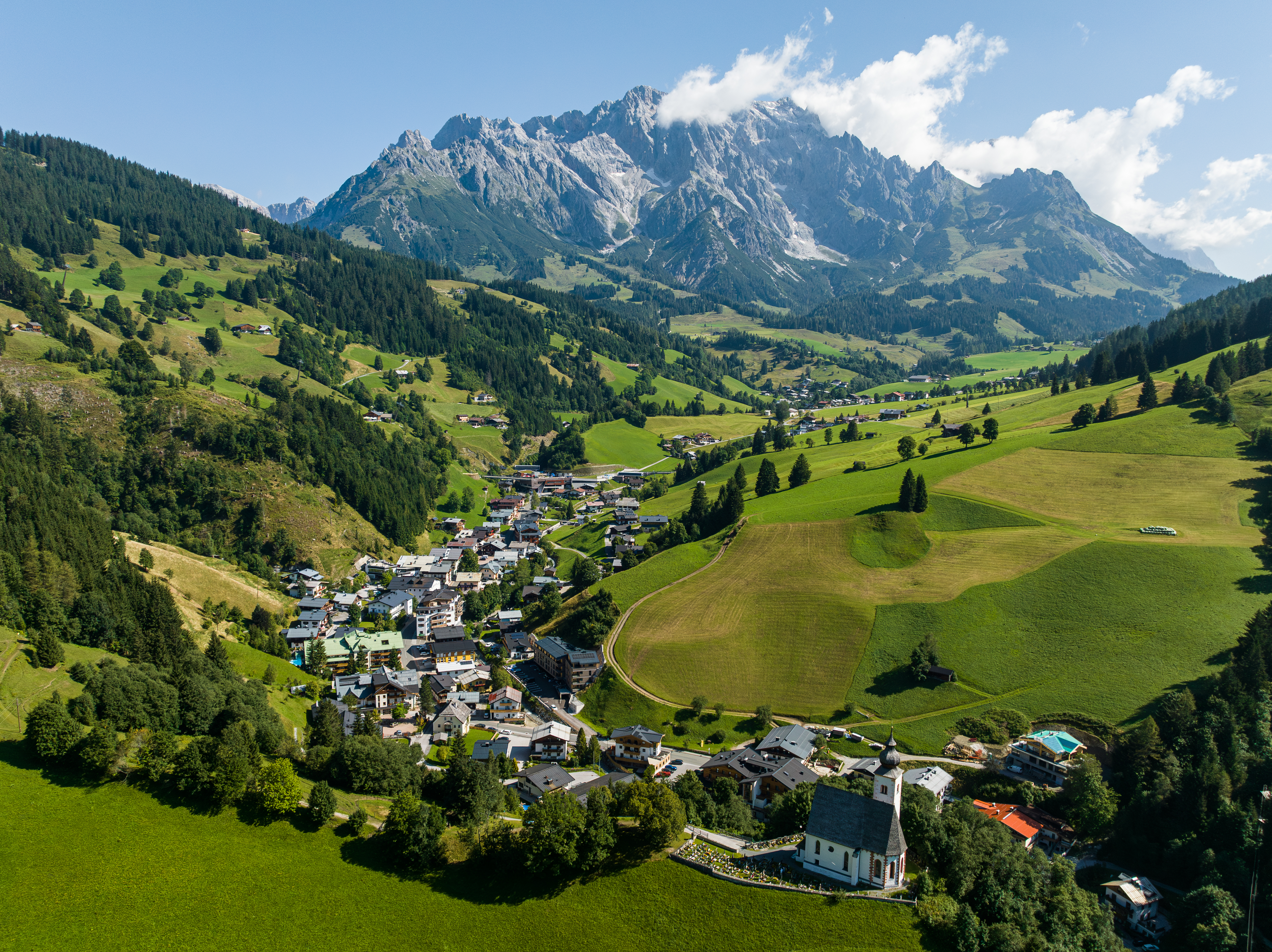
- Dienten am Hochkönig in 2023

- Coat of arms

- Location within Austria
- Coordinates: 47°22′00″N 13°00′00″E
- Country: Austria
- State: Salzburg
- District: Zell am See

Government
  - Mayor: Klaus Portenkirchner (SPÖ)

Area
  - Total: 49.76 km^{2} (19.21 sq mi)
- Elevation: 1,071 m (3,514 ft)

Population (2018-01-01)
  - Total: 761
  - Density: 15.3/km^{2} (39.6/sq mi)
- Time zone: UTC+1 (CET)
  - Summer (DST): UTC+2 (CEST)
- Postal code: 5652
- Area code: 06461
- Vehicle registration: ZE
- Website: www.dienten.salzburg.at

Dienten am Hochkönig (German pronunciation: [ˈdiə̯ntn̩]) is a municipality in the district of Zell am See (Pinzgau region), in the state of Salzburg in Austria. The population (as of May 2001) is 800.

Dienten is also part of the High King Mountain Ski Area.

== Geography ==
The municipality is located in the Pinzgau in the Salzburgerland at the foot of the Hochkoenig mountain. (2,943m)

== History ==
Dienten was first mentioned in 963. Since the Medieval age, there was an iron mine in the region of Dienten which was abandoned in 1864.

== Notable people ==
- Johann Oberreiter (1807–1865): former mayor of Werfen and convicted murderer
- Sepp Haider (born 1953): rally driver
