= Pinzgauer =

Pinzgauer may refer to:

- An inhabitant of the Pinzgau, in the state of Salzburg, Austria
- The Pinzgauer Cattle breed
- The Steyr-Puch Pinzgauer, an off-road vehicle
- The Noriker horse breed, also known as Pinzgauer or Norico-Pinzgauer
- The Pinzgauer Lokalbahn, or Pinzgaubahn; a railway in the area.
