= Lukas Herzog =

Lukas Herzog may refer to:

- Lukas Herzog (basketball), German basketball player
- Lukas Herzog (ice hockey), Austrian ice hockey player
