= Schmitten Tunnel =

Road tunnel in Austria

Coordinates: 47°18′42″N 12°47′32″E

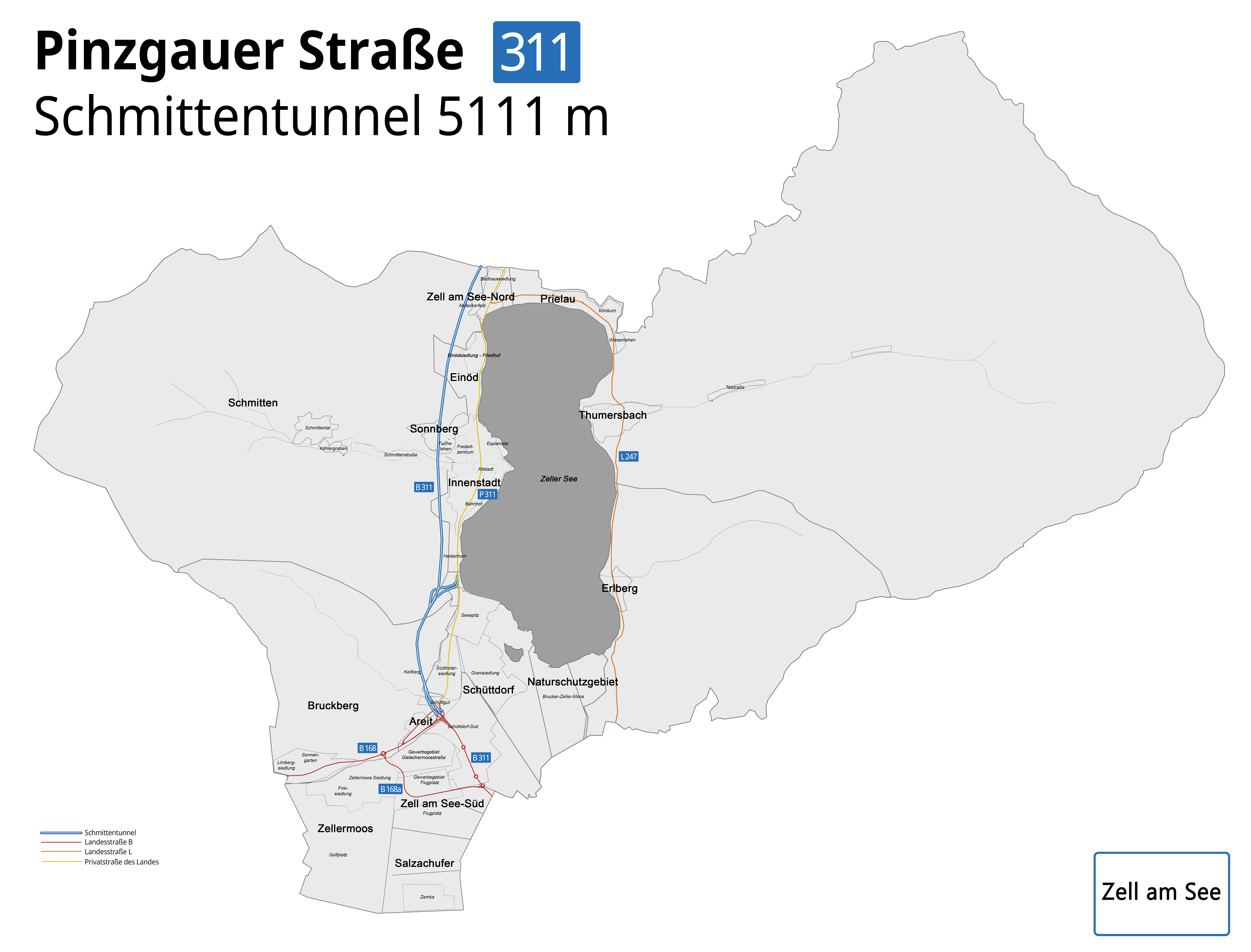
Schmitten Tunnel

The Schmitten Tunnel (German: Schmittentunnel) is the bypass tunnel for the town of Zell am See in Austria and a road tunnel on the Pinzgau Road (Pinzgauer Straße, B 311) in the Austrian state of Salzburg.

The Schmitten Tunnel has a length of 5,111 metres and acts as a relief road for the through road in Zell am See, that is normally very busy. The tunnel stretches from the suburb of Zell am See-Süd to the northern end of the town of Zell am See. One feature is the junction in the tunnel for the Old Town (Altstadt) of Zell am See.

Construction on the tunnel began in 1993 and breakthrough was achieved on 18 July 1994. In 1996 it was completed at a cost of around 1.39 Billion schillings (about 101.3 million euros).
