= Hoher Tenn =

Mountain in the Glockner Group in Salzburg

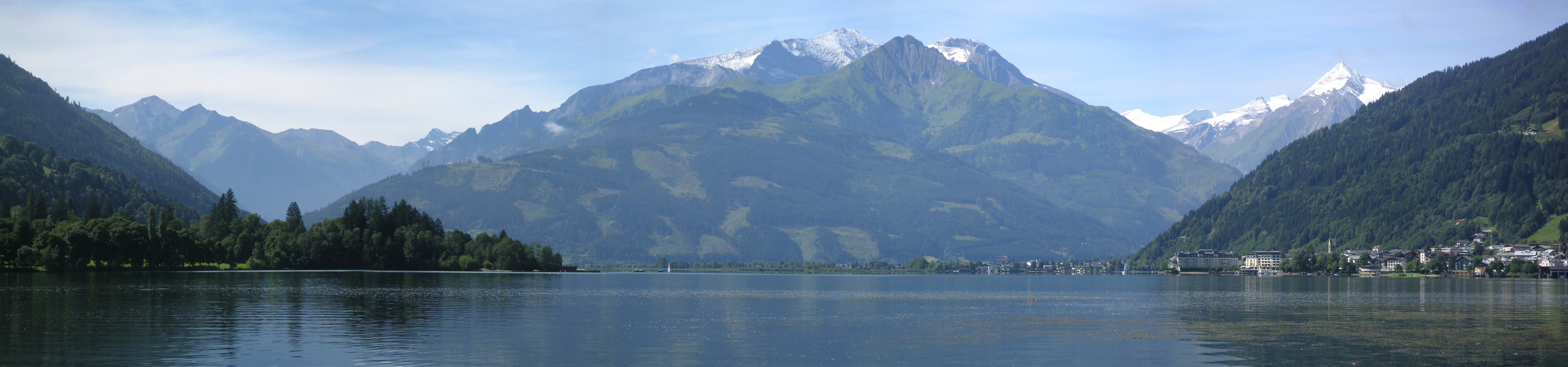
- View looking south from the N end of the Zeller See over Zell am See; Centre: Hoher Tenn (3,368 m) with the Imbachhorn (2,470 m) and foothills. Right: Kitzsteinhorn (3,203 m); left: Schwarzkopf (2,765 m)

Highest point
- Elevation: 3,368 m (AA) (11,050 ft)
- Prominence: 337 m ↓ Wiesbach Col (Wiesbachscharte)
- Isolation: 2.1 km → Großes Wiesbachhorn
- Listing: Alpine mountains above 3000 m
- Coordinates: 47°10′45″N 12°45′02″E

Geography
- Location within Austria
- Location: Salzburg, Austria
- Parent range: Glocknergruppe, Hohe Tauern

Geology
- Mountain type: Double summit
- Rock type: limestone schist / summit block made of serpentinite

Climbing
- First ascent: about 1840 by Cardinal Frederick, Prince of Schwarzenberg, with a small company
- Normal route: from the Gleiwitz Hut via Kempsenkopf, Hirzbachtörl and the northwest ridge to the summit

The Hoher Tenn, formerly also called the Hochtenn, is a double-peaked mountain in the Austrian federal state of Salzburg. It has a southwest summit, called the Bergspitze with a height of 3,368 metres (11,050 ft), and a northeast summit, the Schneespitze, which is 3,317 metres (10,883 ft) high. The Tenn belongs to the Glockner Group in the central part of the High Tauern in the Austrian Central Alps. Between the two summits at a height of 3,293 metres (10,804 ft) is the Tenn Saddle (Tennsattel). Long knife-edge ridges run away to the northeast and northwest. It has a large topographical prominence, especially to the north, which, together with its easy accessibility, make it a popular climbing mountain. Seen from Zell am See in the Pinzgau it is second only to the Imbachhorn (2,470 metres (8,100 ft)) in dominating the Tauern panorama.

== History ==
The Hoher Tenn was first ascended, according to unconfirmed sources, in the 1840s by Cardinal Frederick, Prince of Schwarzenberg "with a small company" (in kleiner Gesellschaft). The first documented crossing of both summits was on 16 August 1871 by the furrier, Albert Kaindl, from Linz and Josef Pöschl from Vienna with mountain guide, Johann Grill, known as the Kederbacher. That said, the party found trigonometric signs on both peaks that must have been made in the 1850s as part of the state survey.

== Bibliography ==
- Willi End: Alpine Club Guide Glocknergruppe, Bergverlag Rother, Munich, 2003, ISBN 3-7633-1266-8
- Eduard Richter: Die Erschließung der Ostalpen, III. Band, Verlag des Deutschen und Oesterreichischen Alpenvereins, Berlin, 1894
- Alpine Club Map 1:25,000, Sheet 40, Glocknergruppe
