= Krimml =

- Municipality
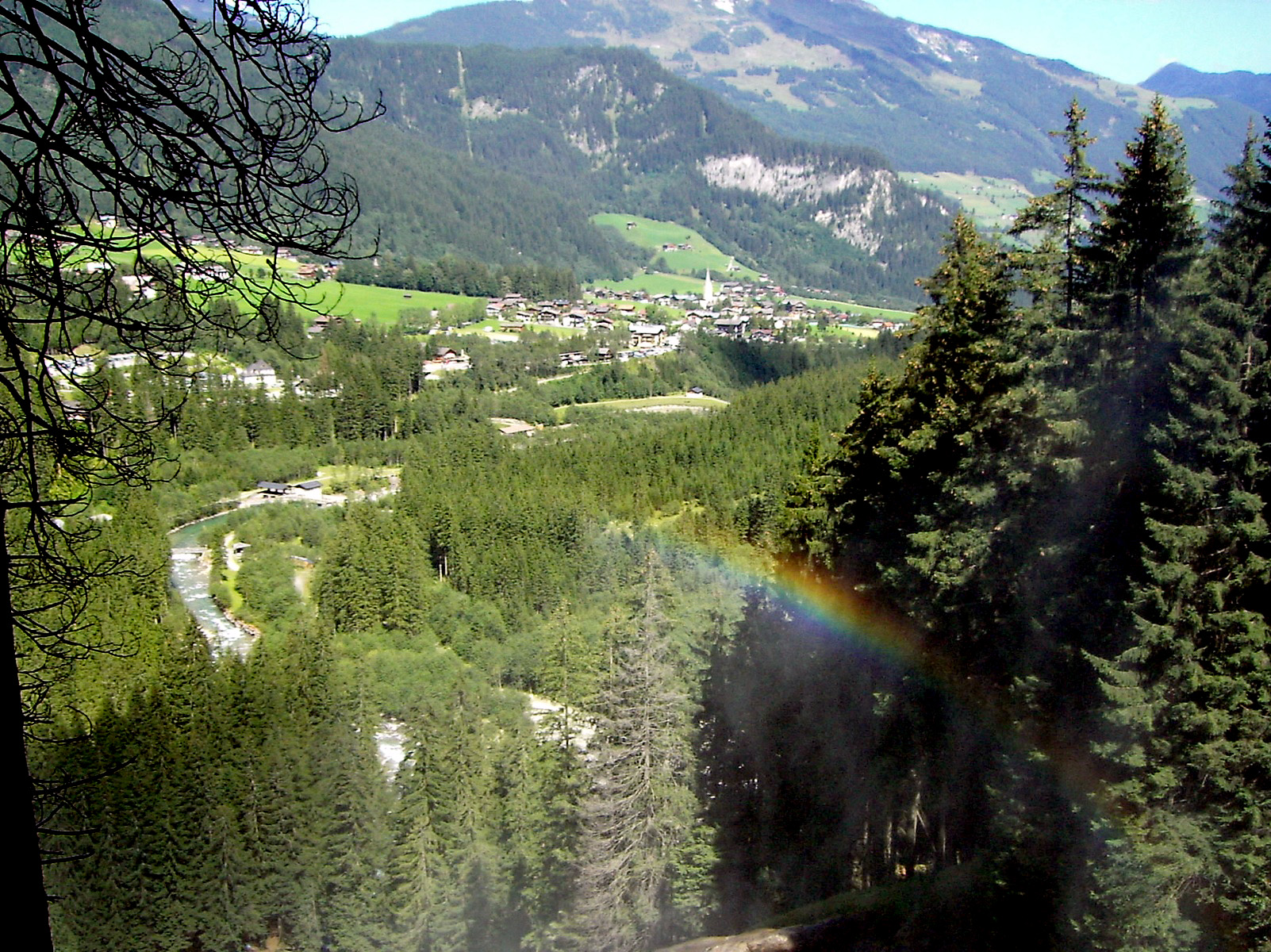
- View from Krimml Falls

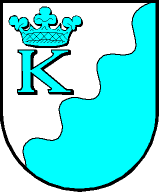
- Coat of arms

- Location within Austria
- Coordinates: 47°13′06″N 12°10′24″E
- Country: Austria
- State: Salzburg
- District: Zell am See

Government
  - Mayor: Erich Czerny (ÖVP)

Area
  - Total: 169.23 km^{2} (65.34 sq mi)
- Elevation: 1,067 m (3,501 ft)

Population (2018-01-01)
  - Total: 847
  - Density: 5.01/km^{2} (13.0/sq mi)
- Time zone: UTC+1 (CET)
  - Summer (DST): UTC+2 (CEST)
- Postal code: 5743
- Area code: 06564
- Vehicle registration: ZE
- Website: www.krimml.at

Krimml is a municipality in Zell am See District, in the federal state of Salzburg, Austria, in the Pinzgau region.

== Geography ==
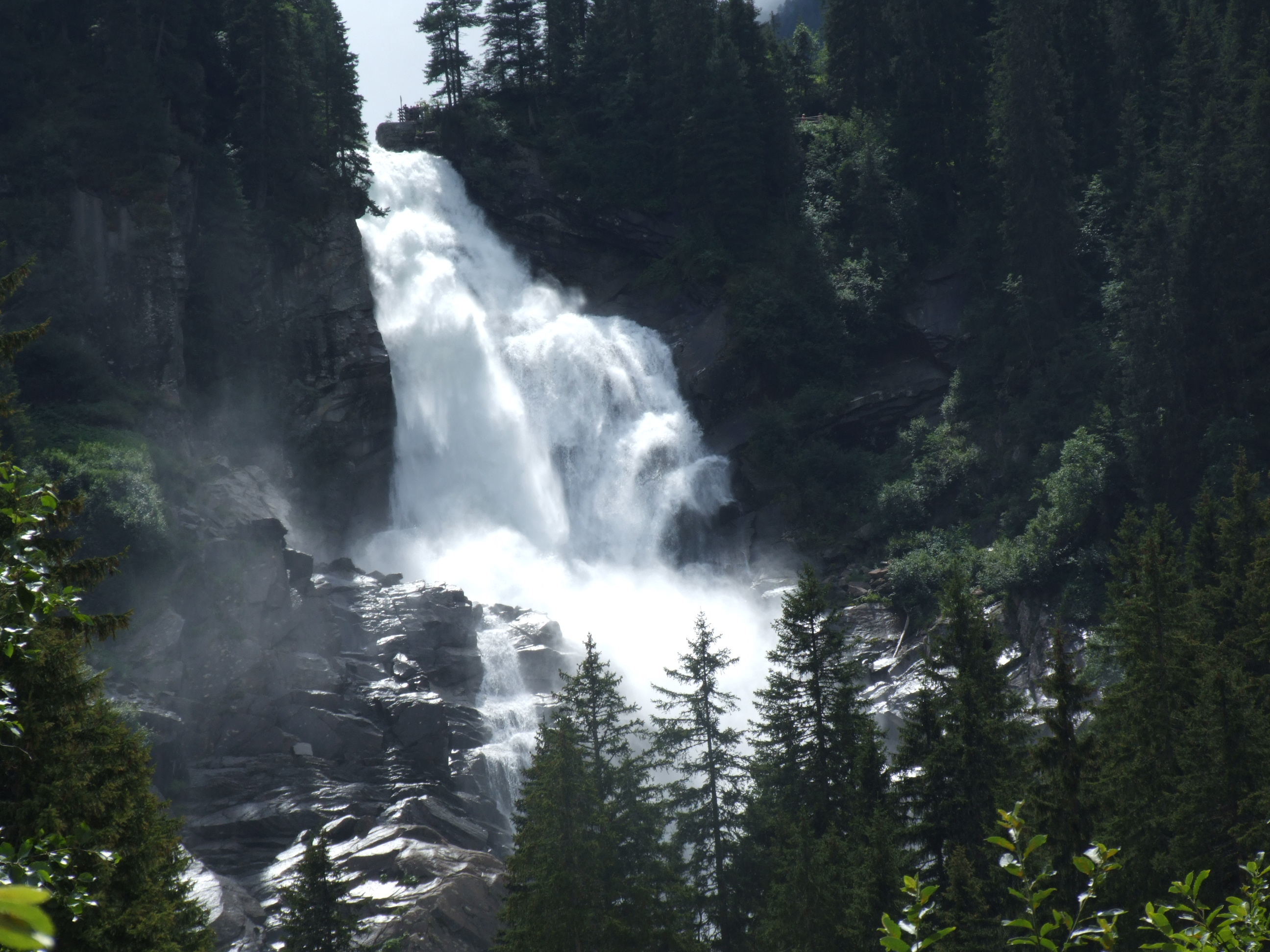
Krimml Waterfalls

Krimml is situated on the Salzach river, at the southwestern rim of the upper (western) Pinzgau region near the border with Tyrol. It is located about 54 km (34 mi) west of the town of Mittersill and 54 km (34 mi) from the district capital Zell am See. The settlement's centre area is situated at an elevation of 1,067 m (3,501 ft) above sea level.

In the west, the Gerlos Pass road leads via Wald im Pinzgau into the Tyrolean Zillertal. In the south, the Krimmler Ache Valley (Krimmler Achental) with its extended mountain pastures leads up to the Dreiherrnspitze peak at 3,499 m (11,480 ft), part of the Venediger Group subrange in the High Tauern. The nearby bridle path across Birnlücke Pass leads across the Alpine crest into the Tauferer Ahrntal of South Tyrol (Italy).

Krimml is known for the Krimml Waterfalls which are a popular tourist destination. With a total drop of about 380 m (1,250 ft) these waterfalls are among Europe's highest. Also, the source of the Salzach river is located north of Krimml, at an elevation of 2,300 m (7,500 ft) above sea level.

== Climate ==
The Köppen Climate Classification subtype for the Krimml climate is "Dfb" (Warm Summer Continental Climate).

Krimml

Climate chart (precipitation, max. and min. temperature)
J	F	M	A	M	J	J	A	S	O	N	D
46 1 −6	42 3 −5	68 7 −2	77 11 1	109 16 5	159 19 8	185 21 10	170 21 10	107 17 7	65 13 3	69 5 −2	57 1 −5
- █ Average max. and min. temperatures in °C
- █ Precipitation totals in mm
- Source: ZAMG
Imperial conversion
J	F	M	A	M	J	J	A	S	O	N	D
1.8 34 21	1.7 37 23	2.7 45 28	3 52 34	4.3 61 41	6.3 66 46	7.3 70 50	6.7 70 50	4.2 63 45	2.6 55 37	2.7 41 28	2.2 34 23
- █ Average max. and min. temperatures in °F
- █ Precipitation totals in inches

== History ==
While archaeological findings denote a settlement of the area in the Early Bronze Age, and also in the Hallstatt culture from the 8th to 6th centuries BC, the present-day Pinzgau was part of the Celtic kingdom of Noricum from about 200 BC. Incorporated into the Roman Empire from 15 BC, a Roman road ran along the Krimmler Ache stream up to the Alpine crest. After the Empire's decline in the 5th century, the area became largely Germanised by Bavarian settlers.

Initially part of the medieval Duchy of Bavaria, the Chrvmbel manor was first mentioned in a 1228 deed, when the upper Pinzgau region was purchased by the Salzburg archbishops. A parish church was mentioned in 1244. At the time, Krimml was strategically important as a stop on the route connecting Salzburg with the Ahrntal and the County of Tyrol.

As in many Salzburg lands where the Protestant Reformation had spread, the peasants in the Krimml area were subject to Counter-Reformation measures enacted by the prince-archbishops and several Protestant families were expelled. After the Archbishopric was secularised, the former ecclesiastical estates finally passed to the Austrian Empire in 1815. From the late 19th century onwards, Alpine tourism gradually became an important economic factor.

== Transport ==
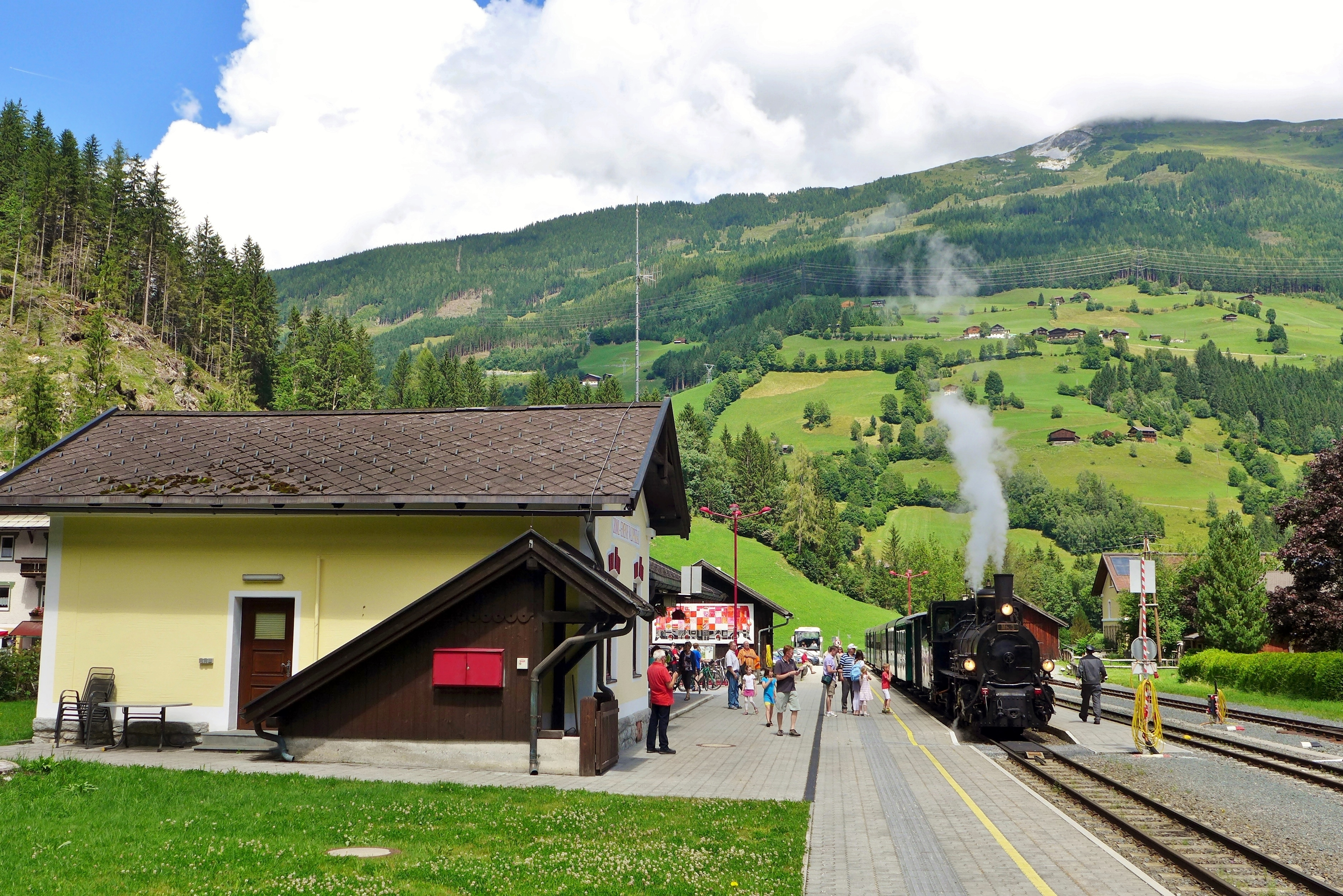
Krimml railway station

Krimml station is the western terminus of the Pinzgauer Lokalbahn narrow-gauge railway line to Zell am See.

== Politics ==
Seats in the municipal assembly (Gemeinderat):

- Austrian People's Party (ÖVP): 7
- Social Democratic Party of Austria (SPÖ): 5
