= Mittersill =

- Municipality
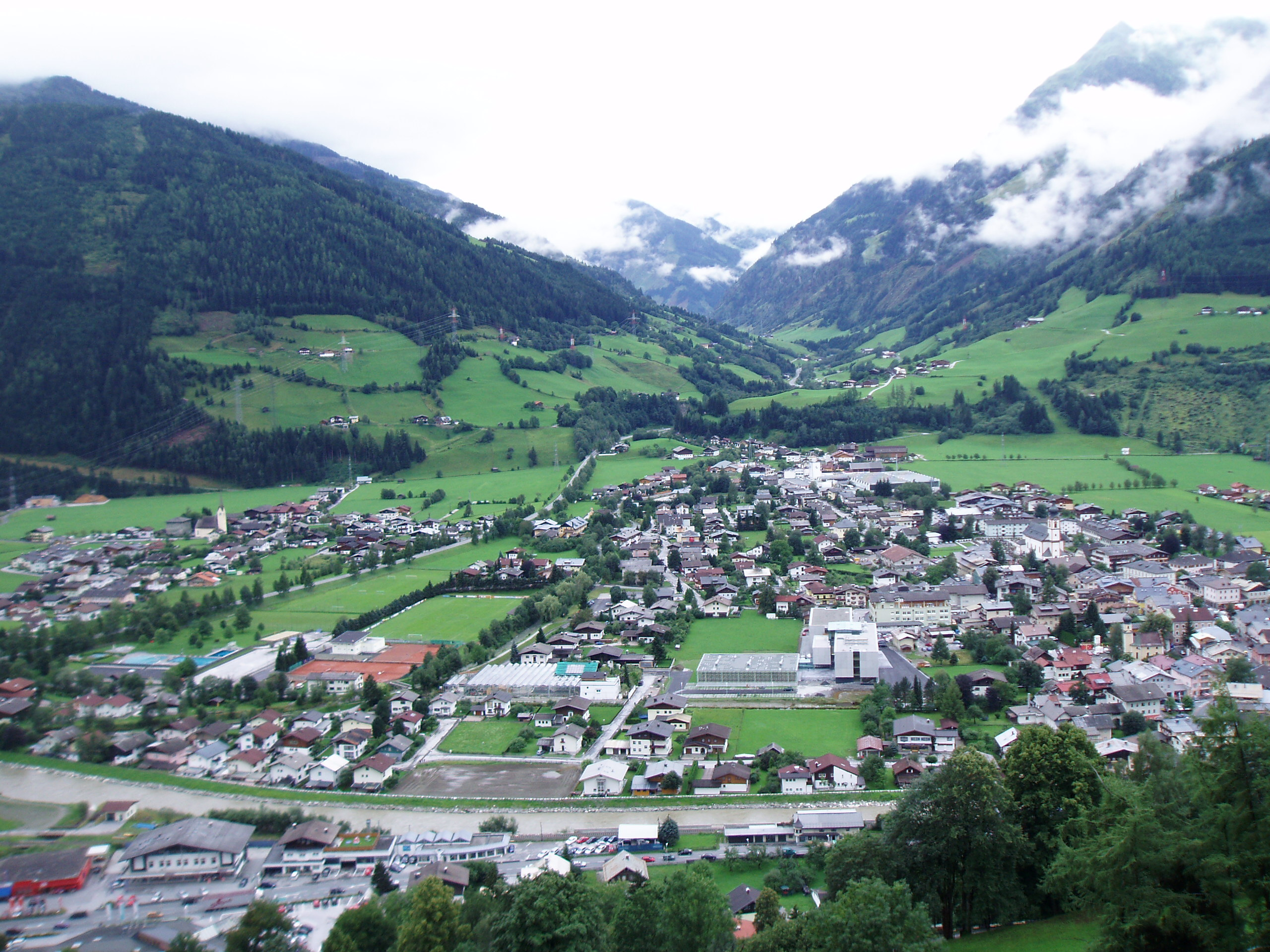

- Coat of arms

- Location within Austria
- Coordinates: 47°16′00″N 12°28′00″E
- Country: Austria
- State: Salzburg
- District: Zell am See

Government
  - Mayor: Wolfgang Viertler (Ind.)

Area
  - Total: 132.04 km^{2} (50.98 sq mi)
- Elevation: 790 m (2,590 ft)

Population (2018-01-01)
  - Total: 5,380
  - Density: 40.7/km^{2} (106/sq mi)
- Time zone: UTC+1 (CET)
  - Summer (DST): UTC+2 (CEST)
- Postal code: 5730
- Area code: 06562
- Vehicle registration: ZE
- Website: www.mittersill.at

Mittersill (German pronunciation: [ˈmɪtɐzɪl]; Bavarian: Mittasü) is a city in the federal state of Salzburg, Austria, in the Pinzgau region of the Alps. It is located on the Salzach River. It has a population of 5,408 as of 2011.

== Geography ==
Mittersill lies approximately 25 km to the west of Zell am See, 30 km to the south of Kitzbühel and 27 km east of the start of the Salzach Valley in Krimml.

Mittersill straddles the Salzach River and one of its tributaries; the Felber. The town is bordered to the south by the Hohe Tauern mountain range, and to the north by the Kitzbühel Alps.

It has traffic links running east to west and north to south. The Felbertauern road tunnel runs south through the Hohe Tauern at an elevation of about 1630 m, providing a connection with Lienz in East Tyrol. To the north lies the Thurn Pass at an elevation of 1274 m, providing a connection with Kitzbühel and Tyrol.

== History ==
There is evidence of a settlement in the Mittersill area during the Bronze Age in around 2200 BC. Mittersill itself was first founded in the 11th century as a part of Bavaria. Its castle was built in the middle of the next century.

Mittersill fell under the control of the Archbishopric of Salzburg in the 13th century and the castle became the seat of the archbishops in Upper Pinzgau. By 1357 Mittersill had a market town charter conferred upon it by the Salzburg Archbishop Ortolf, which boosted the town's profile considerably. By the 14th century it was acting as an important trade crossroads with salt, ice, and copper being taken south over the Felbertauern Pass (2481m) to Southern Tyrol and Friuli in northeastern Italy. Goods such as wine, fruits, velvet, and silks came north over the pass to be taken into present-day Austria and Germany.

In the 1525 German Peasants' War (Bauernkriege), Mittersill castle was burned down and subsequently rebuilt, giving it the appearance that can be seen today. In 1635 and 1746 the town itself was struck by fire and most of the medieval marketplace was destroyed as a result.

Mittersill became linked to Zell am See in 1898 and Krimml along the Salzach Valley with the opening of the Pinzgauer Lokalbahn train service, which still operates today.

A military school for an aerial tramway was founded in Mittersill in 1939. A subcamp of the Mauthausen concentration camp was located here during World War II. Construction work for a goods cable car across the mountain range started in 1943. Part of this cable car included two supports, each 280 m high; one was built of steel, the other was constructed of wood (the tallest ever in this material). As a result of the war, this aerial cable car could not be completed and both pillars were demolished in the 1950s.

On August 8, 2008, Mittersill received city rights.

== Population ==
Historical population
Year	Pop.	±%
1869	2,028	—
1880	2,096	+3.4%
1890	2,120	+1.1%
1900	2,218	+4.6%
1910	2,377	+7.2%
1923	2,211	−7.0%
1934	2,422	+9.5%
1939	2,610	+7.8%
1951	3,155	+20.9%
1961	3,502	+11.0%
1971	4,455	+27.2%
1981	5,027	+12.8%
1991	5,427	+8.0%
2001	5,584	+2.9%
2011	5,408	−3.2%

== Industry ==
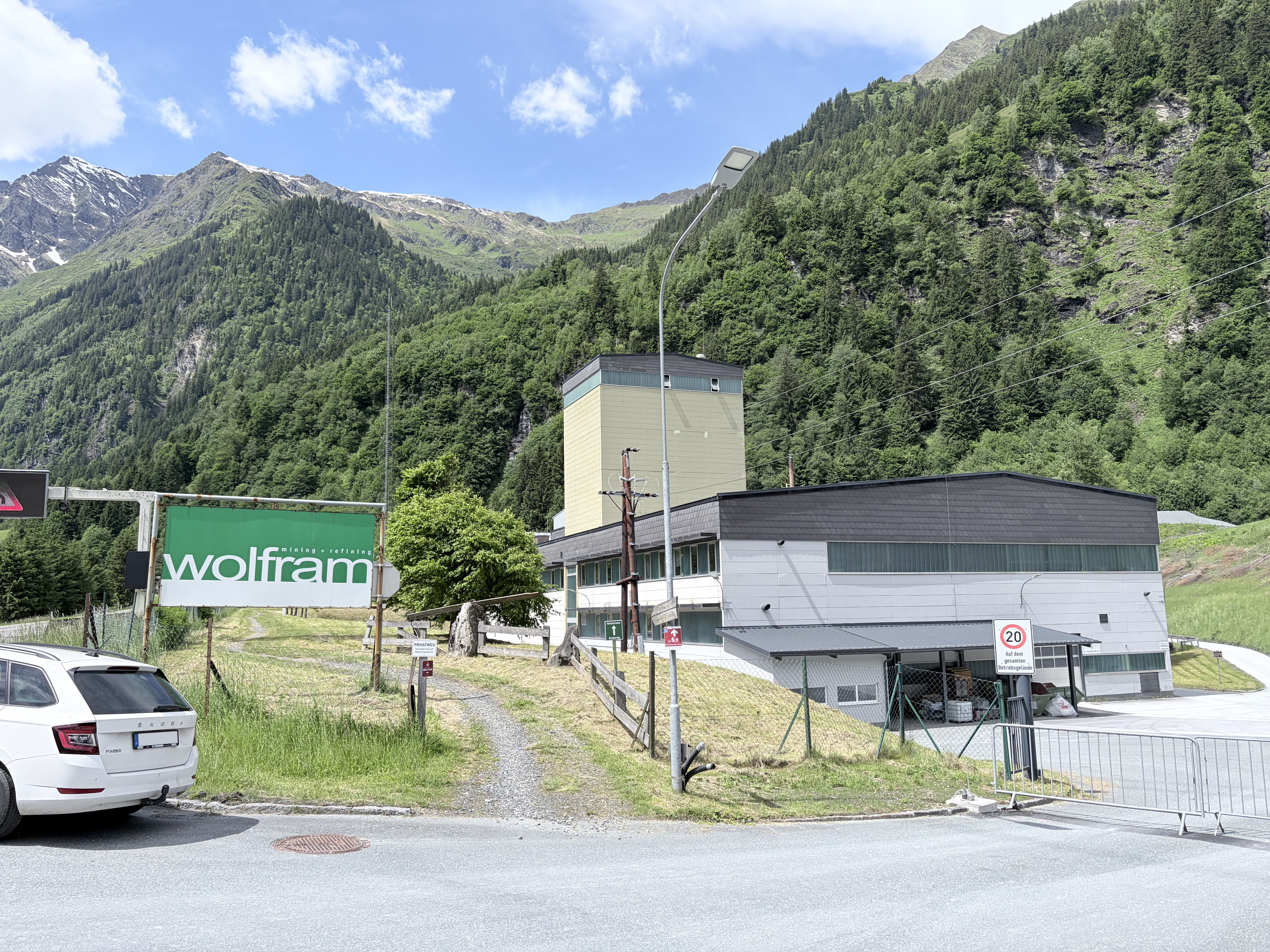
Tungsten mine in Mittersill

Mittersill is home to two large industries, the Blizzard Sport factory, and Fahnen Gärtner flag factory, which provide jobs for the local people. It also has a fair amount of tourist business, attracting mainly skiers and snowboarders during the winter season and hikers in summer. Farming also remains significant with the emphasis mainly on cattle and dairy farming. A large tungsten mine is located south of Mittersill. The ore consists mainly of Scheelite.

== Tourism ==
In winter Mittersill is a popular destination for sports such as skiing, snowboarding, and sledding. Mittersill has a connection with the Kitzbühel ski area through the newly built Panoramabahn cable car. It allows access to the Resterhöhe ski area, which in turn is connected to the ski areas of Kirch and the Hahnenkamm at Kitzbühel by the 3S Aerial Tramway; a structure with the largest span of its type in the world. Mittersill is also close to other well-known ski resorts such as Zell am See, Kaprun, and the Zillertal Arena.

Mittersill is also located near the municipality of Bramberg am Wildkogel which boasts what is estimated to be (at 14 km), the longest completely lit toboggan run in the world.

In summer Mittersill has an 18-hole golf course and acts as a gateway to the Hohe Tauern National Park with its newly built visitor centre. Popular summer activities include hiking, mountain biking, and paragliding.

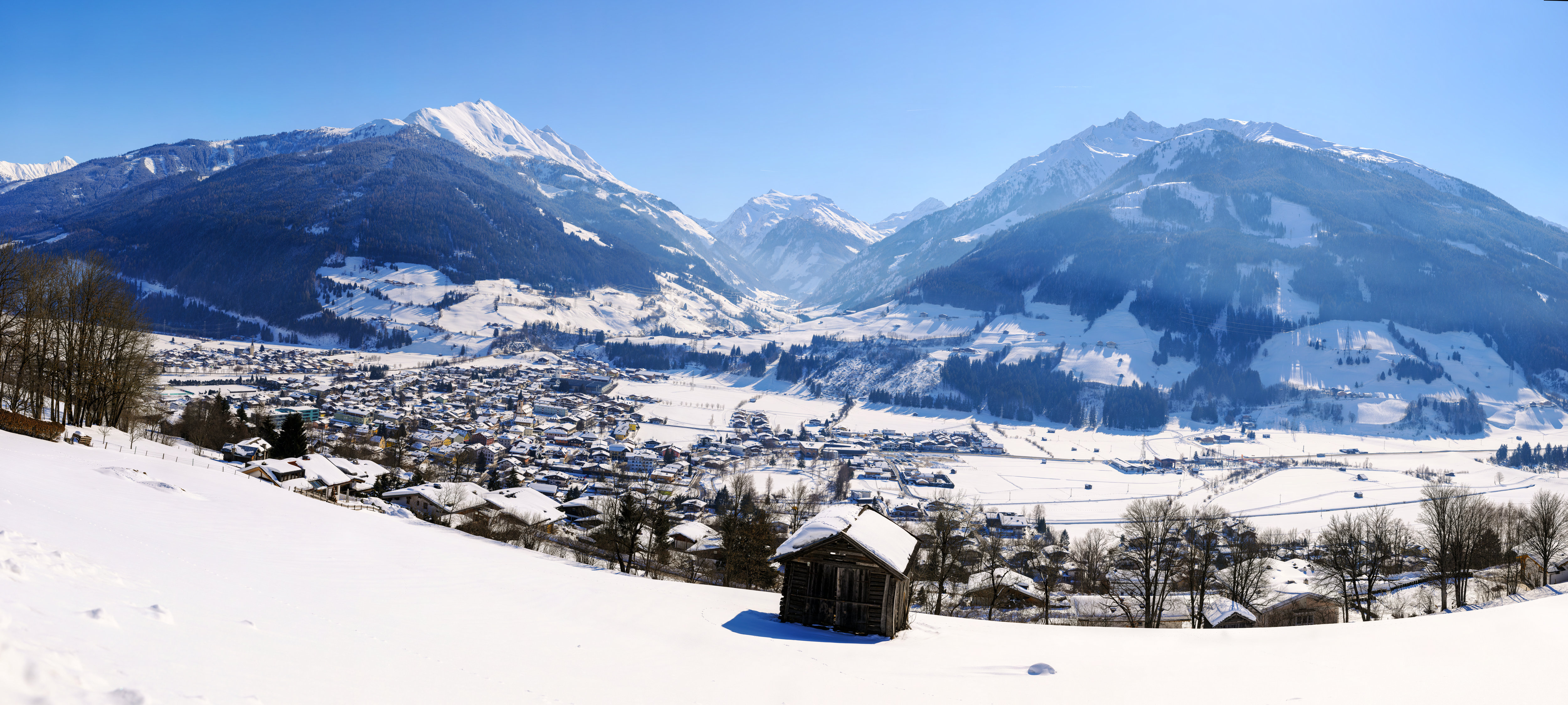

=== Sights ===
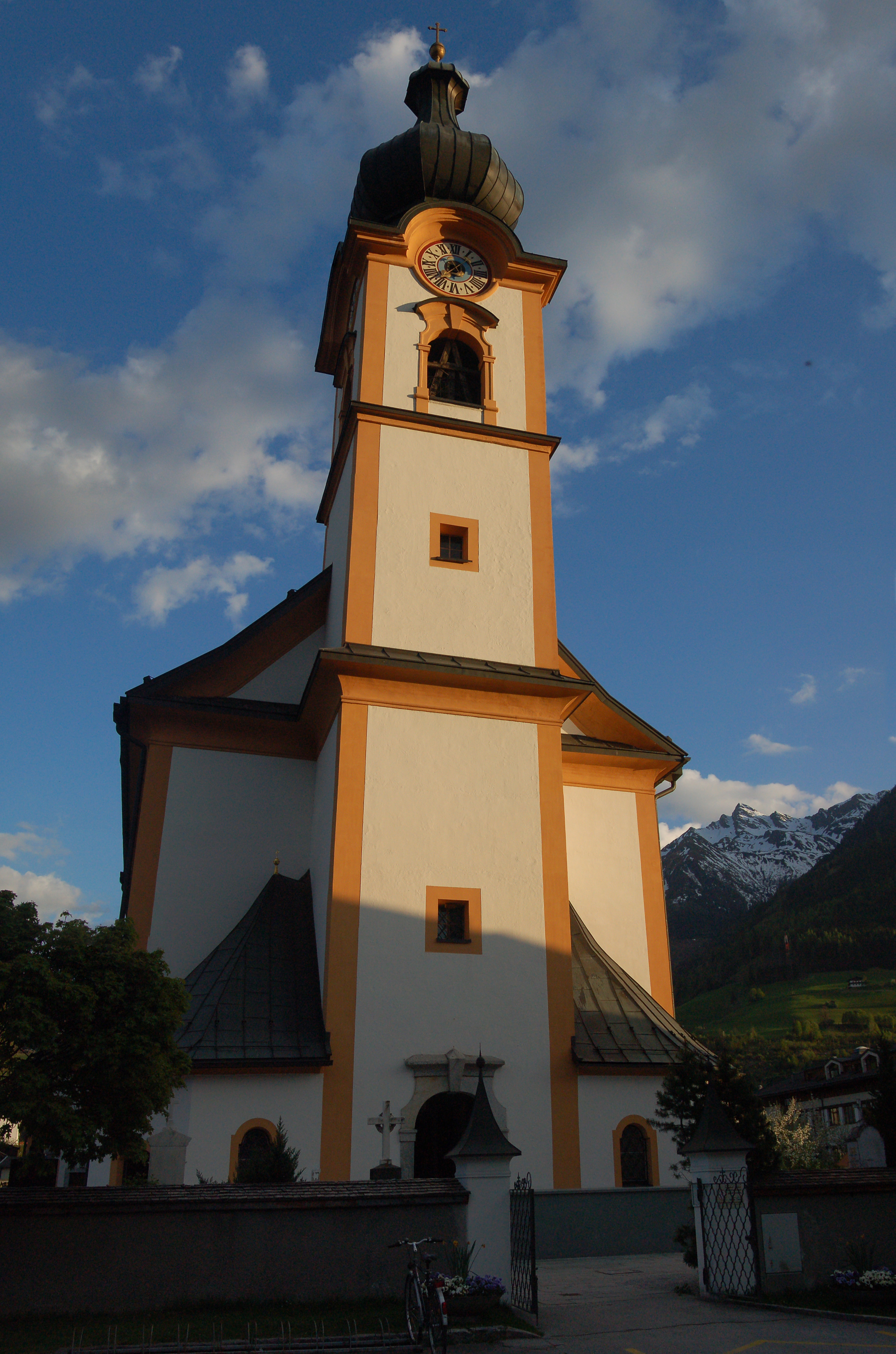
St. Leonhard's Church in Mittersill

Mittersill Castle stands about 140 m above the town, The castle's story began in the 12th century, when the Counts of Lechsgemünd (subsequently: Mittersill) decided to establish their family seat. The current building dates from the 1525 German Peasant's War when the original structure burnt down. Thereafter the building was used as a regional court and centre for witch hunts in the Pinzgau region. The castle has been in private hands since 1888, hosting notable guests such as: Queen Juliana of the Netherlands and Prince Bernhard, the Shah of Iran, Clark Gable, Henry Ford, Bob Hope, and Aristotle Onassis.

The 900-year-old Felber Tower hosts a museum about the local area and its heritage, covering topics such as local history, geology, and mountaineering.

The parish church of St. Leonard originally dates from the 13th century, but has later additions, such as a 1420 stone sculpture of St. Leonard, a Baroque facade and onion dome, and an 18th-century high altar in rococo style.

The smaller church of St. Anna dates from the 18th century and is fashioned in the style of the Tyrolean rococo. Though originally a Roman Catholic church, it is used today for Protestant worship in Mittersill.

St. Nicholas church, located next to the Felber Tower, was built in the 15th century in the late Gothic style. The interior decor is 17th-century Baroque, with the exception of the side altar, which is rococo.

The Hohe Tauern National Park Center opened in Mittersill in 2007. It functions as a museum and centre for the Hohe Tauern National Park, with information about the geology, landscape, flora, and fauna found in the alpine region.
