= Schmittenhöhe =

Mountain in the Kitzbühel Alps, Austria

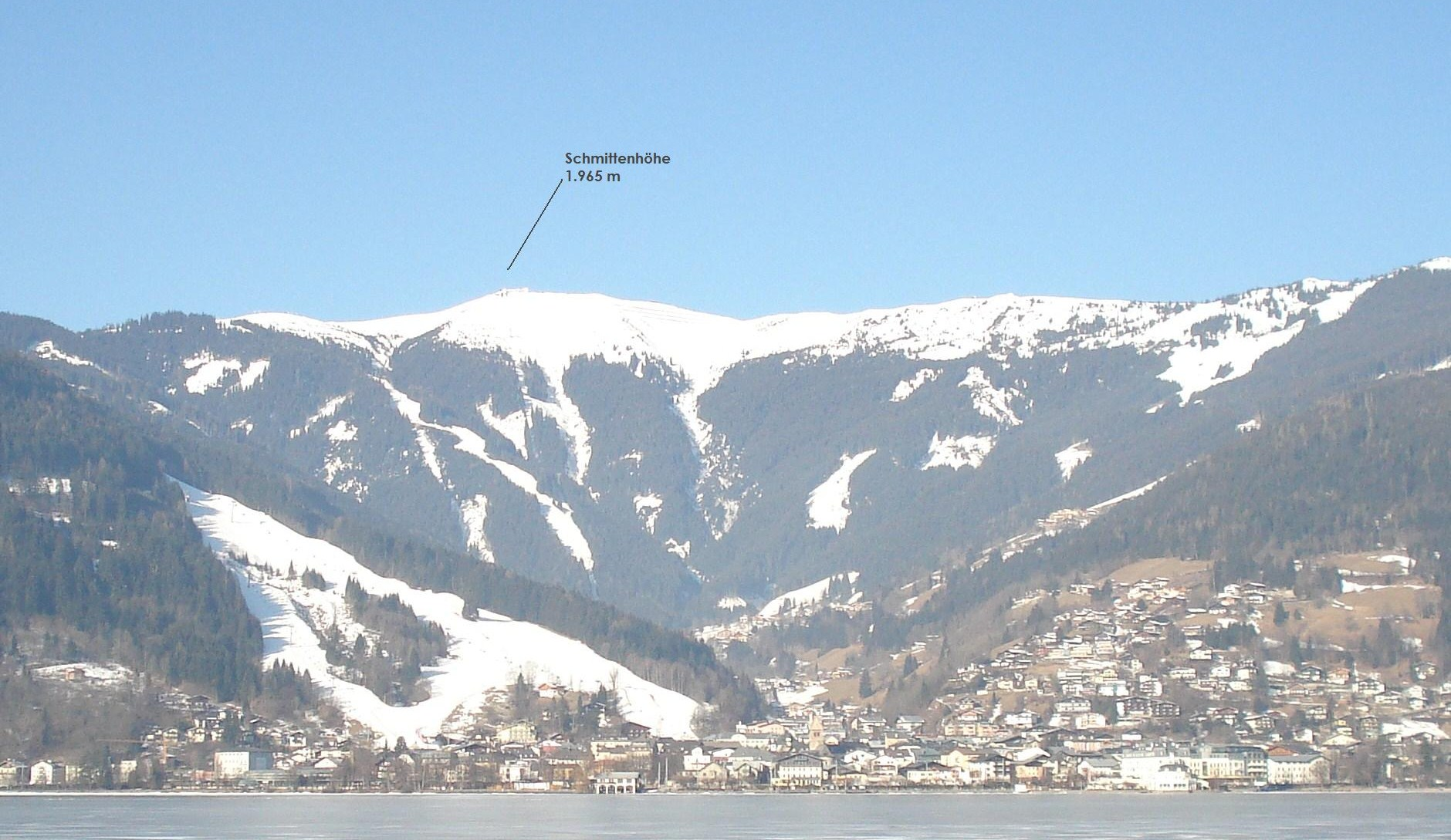
- View of the Schmittenhöhe from Thumersbach

Highest point
- Elevation: 1,965 m (AA) (6,447 ft)
- Coordinates: 47°19′45″N 12°44′16″E

Geography
- Location within Austria
- Location: Salzburg, Austria
- Parent range: Kitzbühel Alps

The Schmittenhöhe is a mountain, 1,965 m (AA) high, on the eastern edge of the Kitzbühel Alps. It is the local mountain of the district capital of Zell am See, from where a cable car was built in 1927 by Adolf Bleichert & Co. that runs to the summit. The cable car system has been renovated several times since. From the summit of the Schmittenhöhe there is a good view of over 30 three-thousanders as well as the lake of Zeller See, the river basin and the whole Saalach valley.

== Climate ==
Climate data for Schmittenhöhe (1971-2000 normals)
Month	Jan	Feb	Mar	Apr	May	Jun	Jul	Aug	Sep	Oct	Nov	Dec	Year
Record high °C (°F)	11.8 (53.2)	12.1 (53.8)	11.8 (53.2)	15.2 (59.4)	19.2 (66.6)	22.2 (72.0)	24.2 (75.6)	24.2 (75.6)	23.0 (73.4)	18.0 (64.4)	15.0 (59.0)	13.2 (55.8)	24.2 (75.6)
Mean daily maximum °C (°F)	−1.1 (30.0)	−1.4 (29.5)	−0.2 (31.6)	2.3 (36.1)	8.0 (46.4)	10.9 (51.6)	13.4 (56.1)	13.9 (57.0)	10.7 (51.3)	7.4 (45.3)	1.6 (34.9)	−0.3 (31.5)	5.4 (41.8)
Daily mean °C (°F)	−4.5 (23.9)	−4.9 (23.2)	−3.4 (25.9)	−1.0 (30.2)	4.4 (39.9)	7.1 (44.8)	9.5 (49.1)	9.9 (49.8)	6.9 (44.4)	3.7 (38.7)	−1.6 (29.1)	−3.4 (25.9)	1.9 (35.4)
Mean daily minimum °C (°F)	−6.8 (19.8)	−7.3 (18.9)	−6.0 (21.2)	−3.4 (25.9)	1.6 (34.9)	4.0 (39.2)	6.4 (43.5)	7.1 (44.8)	4.2 (39.6)	1.1 (34.0)	−4.2 (24.4)	−6.0 (21.2)	−0.8 (30.6)
Record low °C (°F)	−27.3 (−17.1)	−22.3 (−8.1)	−25.0 (−13.0)	−13.1 (8.4)	−10.8 (12.6)	−4.9 (23.2)	−2.8 (27.0)	−2.7 (27.1)	−7.0 (19.4)	−13.6 (7.5)	−19.1 (−2.4)	−22.0 (−7.6)	−27.3 (−17.1)
Average precipitation mm (inches)	99.7 (3.93)	92.3 (3.63)	109.6 (4.31)	105.8 (4.17)	116.8 (4.60)	180.4 (7.10)	203.0 (7.99)	172.6 (6.80)	118.6 (4.67)	86.8 (3.42)	103.3 (4.07)	112.6 (4.43)	1,501.5 (59.12)
Average snowfall cm (inches)	91.5 (36.0)	90.3 (35.6)	118.5 (46.7)	63.9 (25.2)	19.2 (7.6)	6.2 (2.4)	2.1 (0.8)	0.4 (0.2)	14.3 (5.6)	37.2 (14.6)	76.9 (30.3)	90.1 (35.5)	610.6 (240.5)
Average precipitation days (≥ 1 mm)	9.8	10.2	13.3	12.7	13.2	17.1	17.3	15.3	11.3	9.7	11.4	11.1	152.4
Average snowy days (≥ 1 cm)	31.0	28.3	31.0	29.8	21.3	4.2	1.0	0.7	4.1	9.0	24.0	29.5	213.9
Average relative humidity (%) (at 07:00)	65.7	69.3	74.4	78.2	77.3	81.1	80.8	78.4	77.7	69.2	71.0	67.8	74.2
Mean monthly sunshine hours	131.1	134.1	147.5	147.9	178.0	155.2	181.0	185.5	169.2	177.3	118.8	117.7	1,843.3
Percentage possible sunshine	49.4	49.3	42.7	38.5	40.3	35.4	40.2	44.8	48.0	54.9	43.5	47.0	44.5
Source: zamg.ac.at

Climate data for Schmittenhöhe: 1956m (1991−2020)
Month	Jan	Feb	Mar	Apr	May	Jun	Jul	Aug	Sep	Oct	Nov	Dec	Year
Mean daily maximum °C (°F)	−0.5 (31.1)	−0.9 (30.4)	1.0 (33.8)	4.2 (39.6)	8.6 (47.5)	12.5 (54.5)	13.5 (56.3)	13.5 (56.3)	10.6 (51.1)	7.8 (46.0)	3.4 (38.1)	0.3 (32.5)	6.2 (43.1)
Daily mean °C (°F)	−3.9 (25.0)	−4.2 (24.4)	−2.2 (28.0)	1.2 (34.2)	5.7 (42.3)	9.2 (48.6)	11.2 (52.2)	11.4 (52.5)	7.5 (45.5)	4.8 (40.6)	0.2 (32.4)	−3.0 (26.6)	3.2 (37.7)
Mean daily minimum °C (°F)	−6.4 (20.5)	−7.5 (18.5)	−4.8 (23.4)	−1.7 (28.9)	2.2 (36.0)	5.5 (41.9)	6.9 (44.4)	7.2 (45.0)	4.3 (39.7)	1.6 (34.9)	−2.6 (27.3)	−5.5 (22.1)	−0.1 (31.9)
Average precipitation mm (inches)	82.2 (3.24)	74.6 (2.94)	98.8 (3.89)	87.7 (3.45)	119.6 (4.71)	148.8 (5.86)	174.2 (6.86)	177.1 (6.97)	118.2 (4.65)	92.1 (3.63)	75.7 (2.98)	79.3 (3.12)	1,328.3 (52.3)
Source: Central Institute for Meteorology and Geodynamics

The Schmittenhöhe has pistes for winter sports. From the Schmittenhöhe numerous long-distance flights may be made by paraglider into the Pinzgau region whose straight, east-west orientation enables long flights to be made.
