= Wolf-Dieter Heiss =

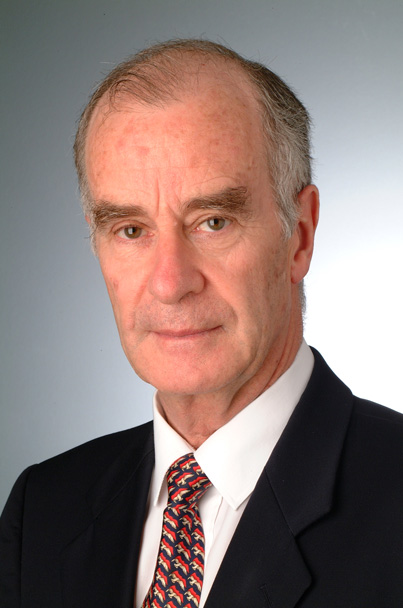
Wolf-Dieter Heiss

Wolf-Dieter Heiss (born 31 December 1939) is an Austrian neuroscientist, director of the department of neurology, University of Cologne and of department of general neurology at the Max-Planck-Institute for Neurological Research, Cologne (Germany).

Wolf-Dieter Heiss was born in Zell am See, Austria. He was educated in Vienna and received his medical degree there in 1965. After training and initial work at the department of neurology of the University of Vienna followed several research appointments in the United States and in Sweden:

- 1 October – 31 December 1965: Massachusetts Institute of Technology, Cambridge, Massachusetts, USA (postdoctoral Fellow)
- 17 July – 30 August 1966: Physiological Institute, Stockholm, Sweden
- 1 October 1968 – 30 September 1969: research assistant professor, Neurosensory Laboratory, State University of New York, Buffalo, U.S.
- 1 July – 10 October 1974: Research associate, department of neurology, University of Minnesota, Minnesota, U.S.

He was habilitated into academic career (venia legendi) in 1970 and in 1976 was appointed as associated professor for neurology at the University of Vienna, where, until 1978, was head of the department of neuro-nuclear medicine.

In 1978 he was asked to come to Cologne, Germany, first as head of Centre for Cerebral Blood Flow Research, from 1982 on as director of the Max-Planck-Institute (MPI) for Neurological Research. Additionally, in 1985, he became the chairman of the department of neurology of the University of Cologne. He retired from his official positions in 2005, but is still continuing his clinical and experimental research at the MPI.

Wolf-Dieter Heiss was involved in experimental and clinical neuroscience and has transferred results from experimental research into clinical application as well as tested clinical questions in animal models. His research activities were concentrated on cerebral ischemia and stroke and of development of imaging modalities for investigations of brain metabolism and function, especially positron emission tomography (PET) in various brain disorders. With this methods he studied the ability of the brain to survive blood flow disturbances, which became the essential basis for the development of effective therapy of stroke, e. g. thrombolysis. Further topics of research included various metabolic disturbances in brain tumors and in dementias, which improved diagnostic accuracy and treatment strategies, as well as patterns of functional activation in healthy controls and patients, which contributed to the understanding of deficits and of compensatory mechanisms.

In 1990 he started the initiative "Cologne against Stroke" ("Köln gegen den Schlaganfall"). Due to this initiative, the time from stroke onset to seeing and treating a patient, e.g. with thrombolysis could be significantly reduced in the service area of the Cologne Department of Neurology. This was, so to say, the prototype of the "Stroke Units".

Heiss is member of many scientific societies, honorary member of the Austrian and the French Neurological Societies, member of the Austrian Academy of Sciences and of the German Academy of Scientists Leopoldina.

- 1992–1996: President of the International Stroke Society.
- 1997–2001: Chairman of the Program Committee of the European Federation of Neurological Societies (EFNS)
- 2001–2005: President of the EFNS

In 2008, he received in Vienna the "Leadership in Stoke Medicine Award" of the World Stroke Organization.

He is married since 8 August 1965 to Dr. Brigitte Heiss.

== Sources ==
- EFNS Newsletter, No.1, 2009
- Deutsche Akademie der Naturforscher Leopoldina, Mitgliederverzeichnis
- Donau-Universität Krems, Personen-Verzeichnis
