= Patrick Machreich =

Austrian ice hockey player

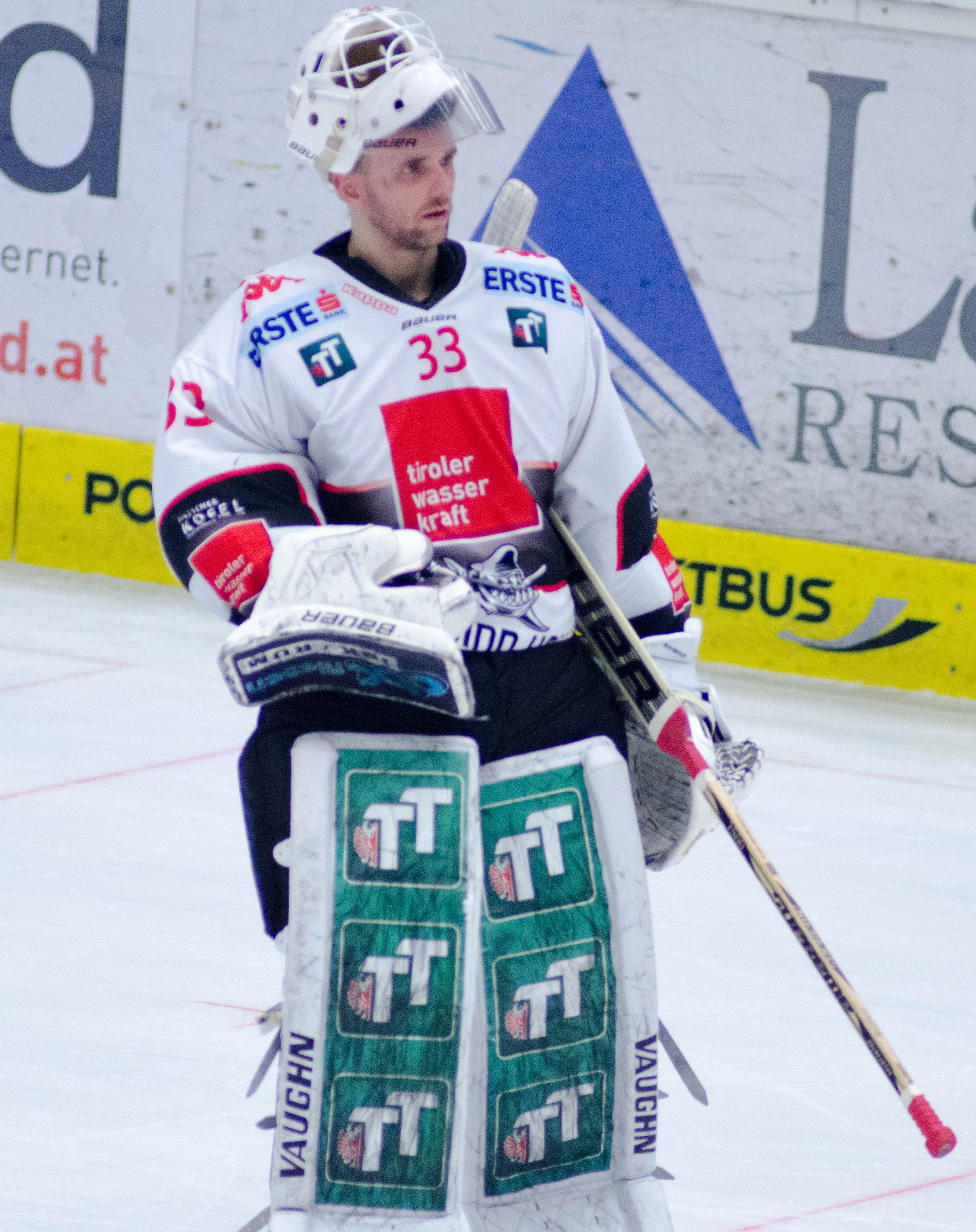
- Born: 29 September 1980 (age 46) Zell am See, Austria
- Height: 6 ft 0 in (183 cm)
- Weight: 172 lb (78 kg; 12 st 4 lb)
- Position: Goaltender
- Caught: Left
- Played for: EK Zell am See; Graz 99ers EC VSV; EHC Black Wings Linz; HC TWK Innsbruck
- National team: Austria
- Playing career: 1997–2019

Patrick Machreich (born 29 September 1980) is an Austrian former professional ice hockey goaltender.

Machreich began his career with his hometown team EK Zell am See in 1997. He played a total of five seasons in the Austrian Hockey League before they were relegated to the Nationalliga in 2002. He played one season in the league before moving to Finland, playing eleven games for Ahmat Hyvinkää in the Finnish Mestis.

He returned to Austria in 2003, signing for the Graz 99ers where he spent two seasons. After one season with VSV EC, he signed for EHC Black Wings Linz in 2006. After two seasons with Linz, Macherich opted to return to the Nationalliga with EHC Lustenau. Machreich made a return to the top level EBEL, in signing and playing for three seasons with HC TWK Innsbruck.

Machreich has also represented Austria in the Ice Hockey World Championships in 2005 and 2007. He also played in the World Junior Championship in 2000.
