= Lukas Herzog (ice hockey) =

Austrian ice hockey player

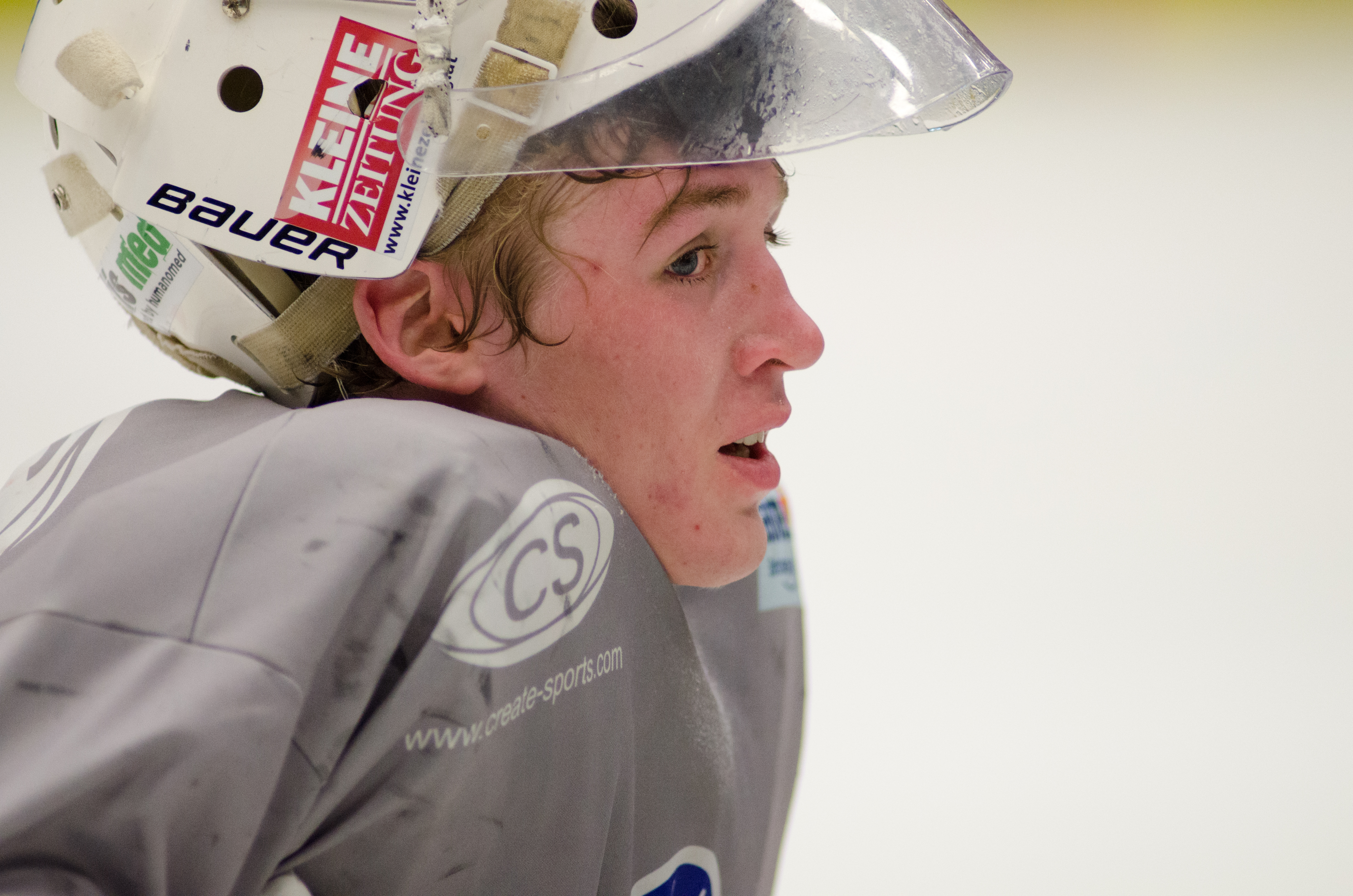
- Born: 7 February 1993 (age 32) Zell am See, Austria
- Height: 6 ft 0 in (183 cm)
- Weight: 170 lb (77 kg; 12 st 2 lb)
- Position: Goaltender
- Caught: Left
- Played for: EC VSV; EC Red Bull Salzburg; Dornbirn Bulldogs
- National team: Austria
- Playing career: 2012–2022

Lukas Herzog (born 7 February 1993) is an Austrian former professional ice hockey Goaltender who played with EC VSV, EC Red Bull Salzburg and Dornbirn Bulldogs in the Austrian Hockey League and the Austrian national team.

He represented Austria at the 2019 IIHF World Championship.

During his tenth professional season, having signed with Dornbirn for the 2021–22 season in an attempt to return from long-term injury, Herzog made 13 appearances before he announced his retirement due to injury on 10 January 2022.
