= Zell am See =

- Municipality
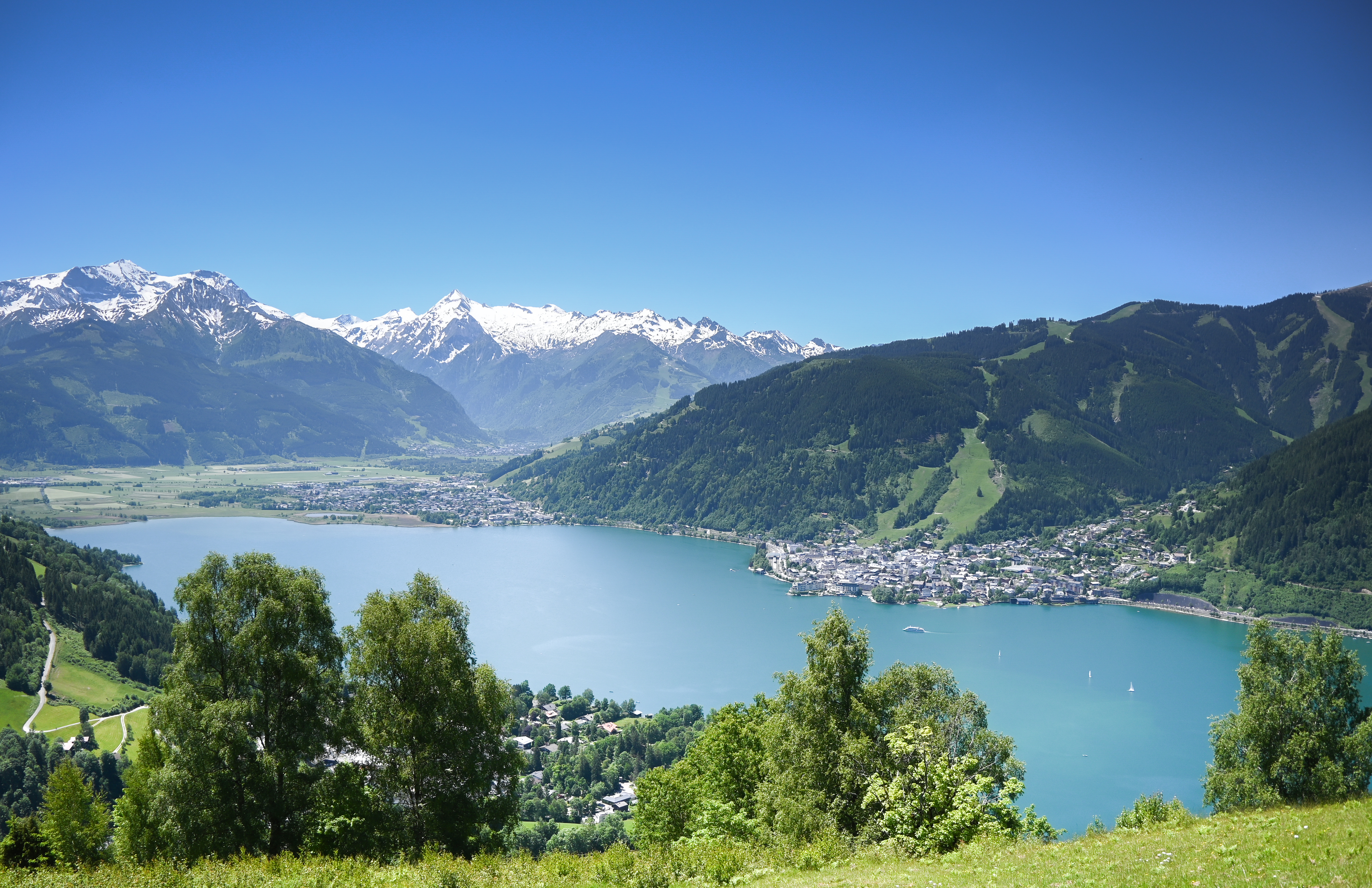
- View over Lake Zell

- Coat of arms

- Location within Austria
- Coordinates: 47°19′N 12°48′E
- Country: Austria
- State: Salzburg
- District: Zell am See

Government
  - Mayor: Andreas Wimmreuter (SPÖ)

Area
  - Total: 55.17 km^{2} (21.30 sq mi)
- Elevation: 750 m (2,460 ft)

Population (2018-01-01)
  - Total: 9,852
  - Density: 178.6/km^{2} (462.5/sq mi)
- Time zone: UTC+1 (CET)
  - Summer (DST): UTC+2 (CEST)
- Postal code: 5700, 5702, 5705
- Area code: 06542
- Vehicle registration: ZE
- Website: www.zellamsee.salzburg.at

Zell am See is the administrative capital of the Zell am See District in the Austrian state of Salzburg.

Located in the Kitzbühel Alps, the town is a transport hub, one of the country's most important summer and winter sports resorts, and an important tourist destination due to its ski resorts and shoreline on Lake Zell. Zell am See has been a favoured winter and summer resort for the European aristocracy since the 19th century, and is today known as a hub of the international jet set.

== Geography ==
The Zell Valley is a corridor in the Kitzbühel Alps, connecting the Saalfelden Basin of the Saalach River in the north and the Salzach in the south. Zell am See is located about 80 km (49 mi) south of Salzburg, 100 km (60 mi) east of Innsbruck and 30 km (20 mi) north Austria's highest mountain, the Grossglockner. The historic centre of Zell am See is located on the western shore of the 68 m-deep (223 ft) Lake Zell, with the villages of Thumersbach to the east, Erlberg to the southeast, and Schüttdorf directly to the south.

=== Subdivisions ===
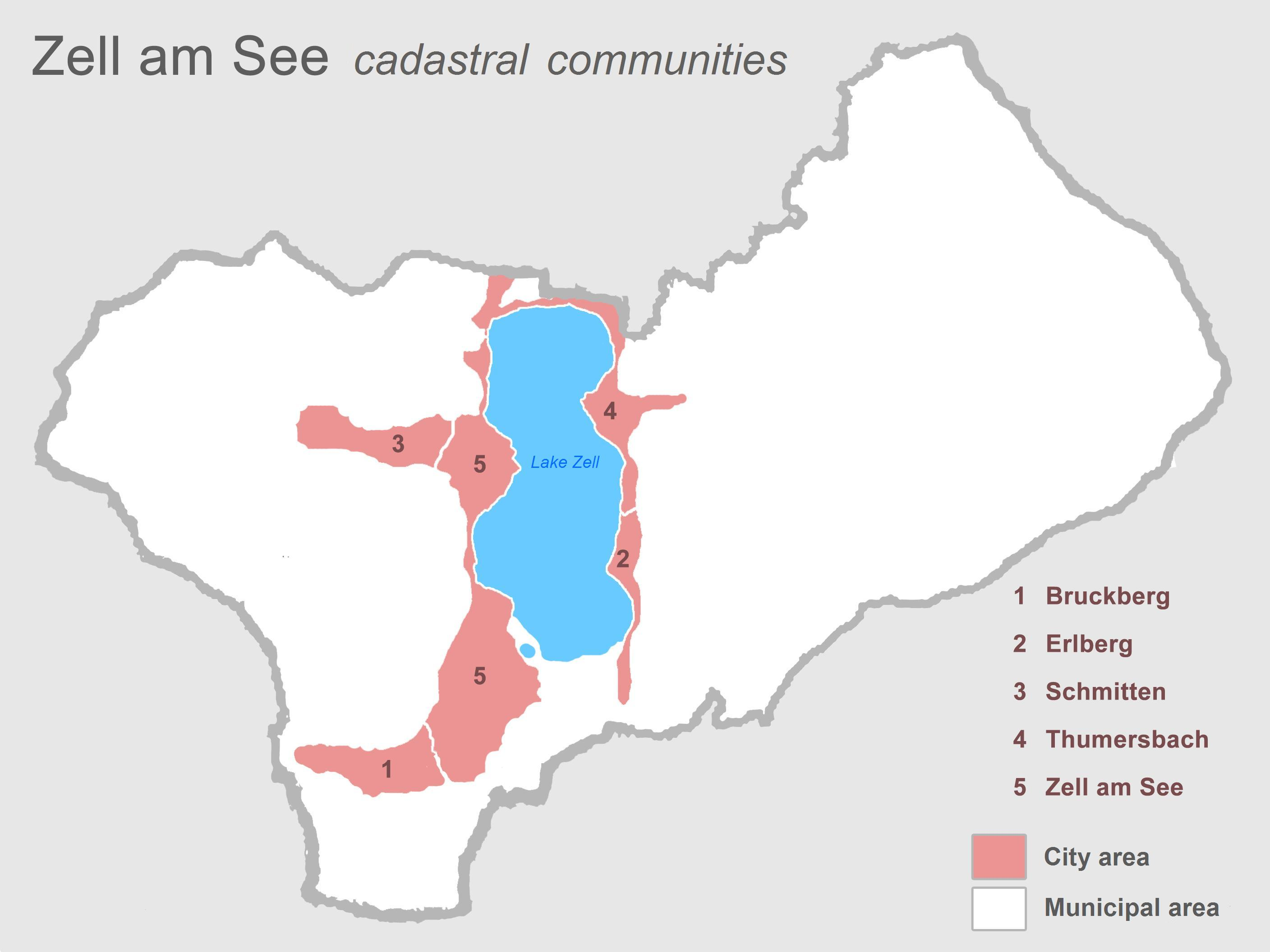
Zell am See cadastral communities

The village of Zell am See comprises five cadastral communities:

1. Bruckberg, a residential area including the Zellermoos locality
2. Erlberg on the southeastern shore of Lake Zell, including a nature reserve
3. Schmitten, above Zell am See proper, location of many cableways
4. Thumersbach, an affluent district and lakeside resort on the eastern shore, including the summer resort of Prielau in the north
5. Zell am See, with the Old Town centre and Schüttdorf

=== Landscape ===
The original Lake Zell reached somewhat further to the north and extended south to the Salzach River. The dimensions of the lake, however, have changed over time into marsh areas. The lake has the shape of a peanut, with an area of 4.7 km^{2} (1.8 sq mi).

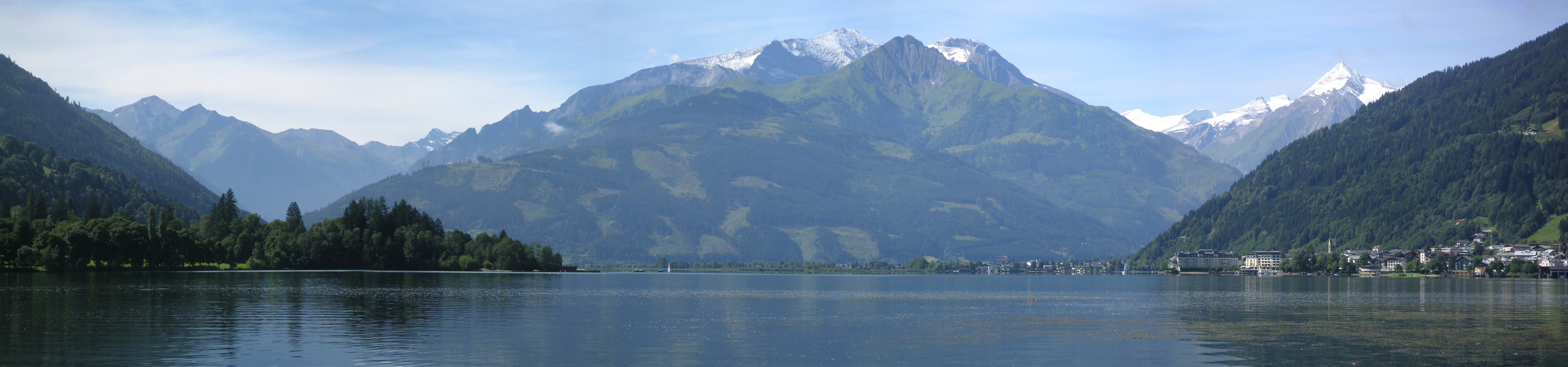
Panoramic view from Lake Zell to Hoher Tenn massif (Zell am See on the right)

The mountains of the area form a horseshoe shape; the slopes are mainly forested or covered with Alpine pastures. The Hausberg ("home mountain") of Zell am See is the Schmittenhöhe, 1,965 m (6,447 ft), which together with the adjacent Salzburg Slate Alps range in the west is part of the Greywacke zone between Northern Limestone and Central Eastern Alps. Mt. Schmittenhöhe is a popular centre for skiing and winter sports. The nearby Mt. Hundstein ("Dog Stone") at 2,117 m (6,946 ft) is the highest peak of the Salzburg Greywacke Zone.

== Tourism ==
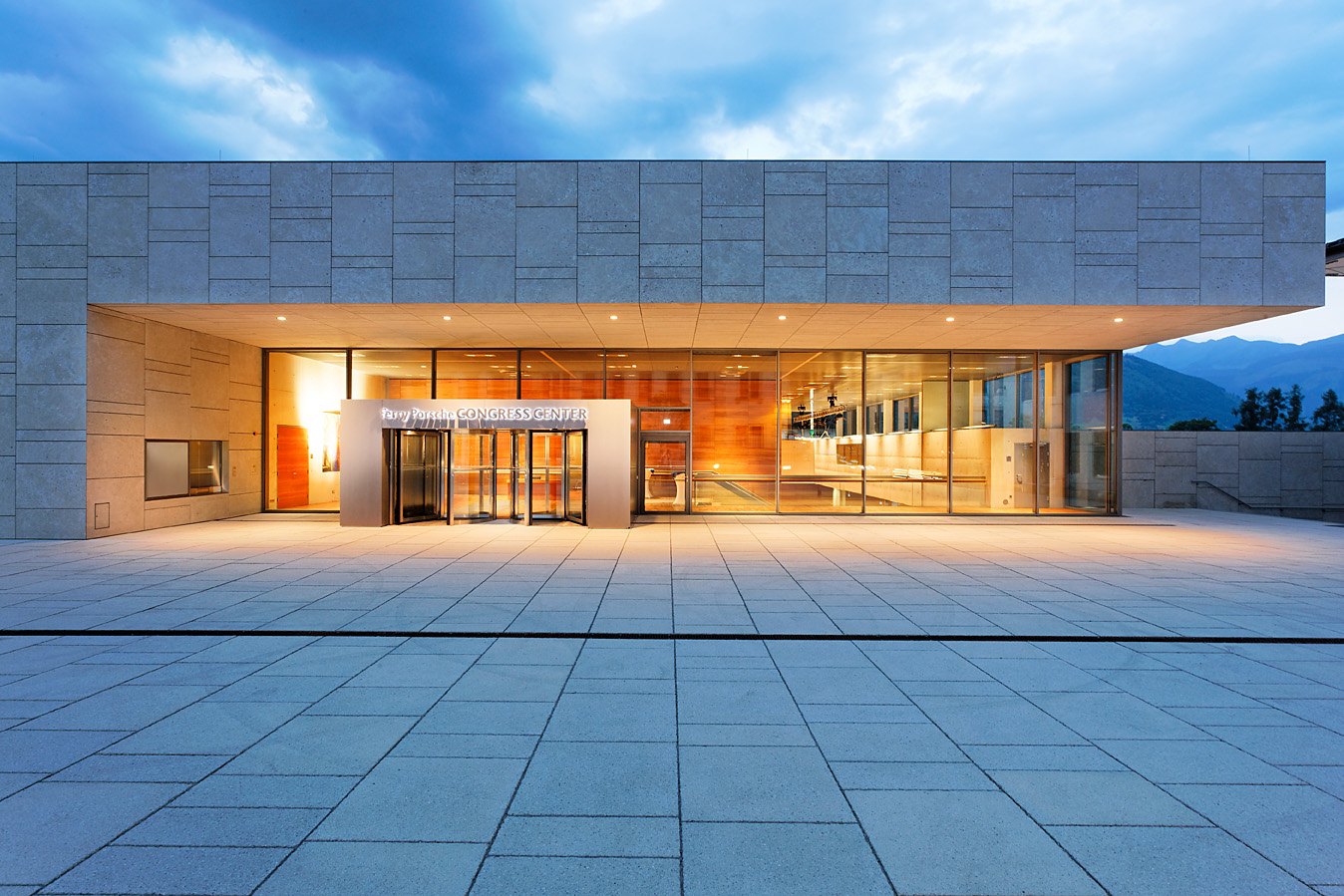
Ferry Porsche Congress Center

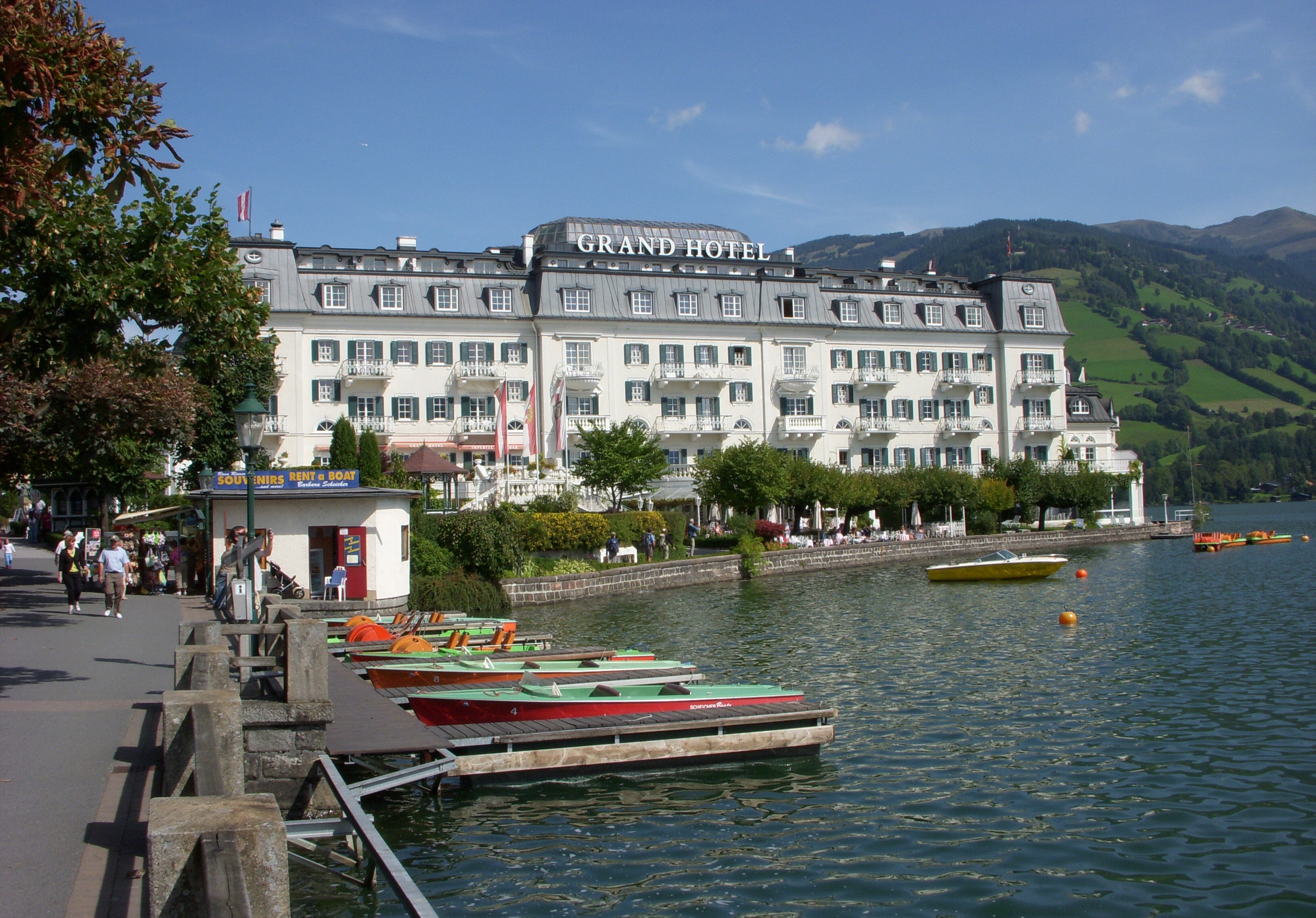
Grand Hotel and Casino

=== Skiing ===
Zell am See provides winter skiing on the above Schmittenhöhe mountain. The skiable area is around 138 km, including the pistes on the Kitzsteinhorn and Kaprun Maiskogel. The ski pass covers the whole area including transport to and from the glacier, which is open most of the year, dependent on snowfall. Zell am See is a low-altitude ski area and snow cover can suffer from higher temperatures, but the glacier has snow cover most of the year.

In 2017, Zell am See announced a potential merger with Saalbach-Hinterglemm ski resort. In the 2019-20 ski season, the Zell am See Express 1 gondola was opened, which allows access to the Zell am See Express 2 gondola at the base of piste 21 from Viehhofen.

Notable ski pistes in the resort include: The Trassabfahrt (14), which is the steepest piste in the region reaching an incline gradient up to 75%, the Standardabfahrt (13), which is another valley run reaching an incline gradient of 60%, and the recently reopened Tannwaldabfahrt (21), a ski-racing piste in the 1930s, and is well known for being consistently icy, and having a high steepness-width ratio in some sections of the piste.

=== Luxury tourism and Porsche family ===
In the 19th century, Zell am See became known as a summer and winter resort for the Austrian and European aristocracy, such as the Empress Elisabeth "Sissi" of Austria, Emperor Franz Joseph, or the von Trapp family.

Zell am See is the seat of the Porsche family, which has contributed to the town's international standing. Since 2001, the family has operated the local airport, and in 2007, the Ferry Porsche Congress Center for conventions was completed. In cooperation with the municipality, the Porsche family hosts the annual International Porsche Days in summer and the Greger Porsche Ice Race (since 1952) in winter. The family owns the Schloss Prielau hotel in a historic castle formerly owned by Hugo von Hoffmansthal on the shore of Lake Zell. The family's private estate is located in the district of Zell am See-Süd.

In the 21st century, Zell am See became a popular summer vacation spot for wealthy Russians and Arabs, many of whom spend their whole summer in one of the luxury lakefront hotels. From November 2022 to October 2023, it recorded 2,792,393 overnight stays, almost as many in summer as in winter. In the 2022/23 winter season, 318,000 visitors stayed in the region (just over 1.4 million overnight stays).

== History ==
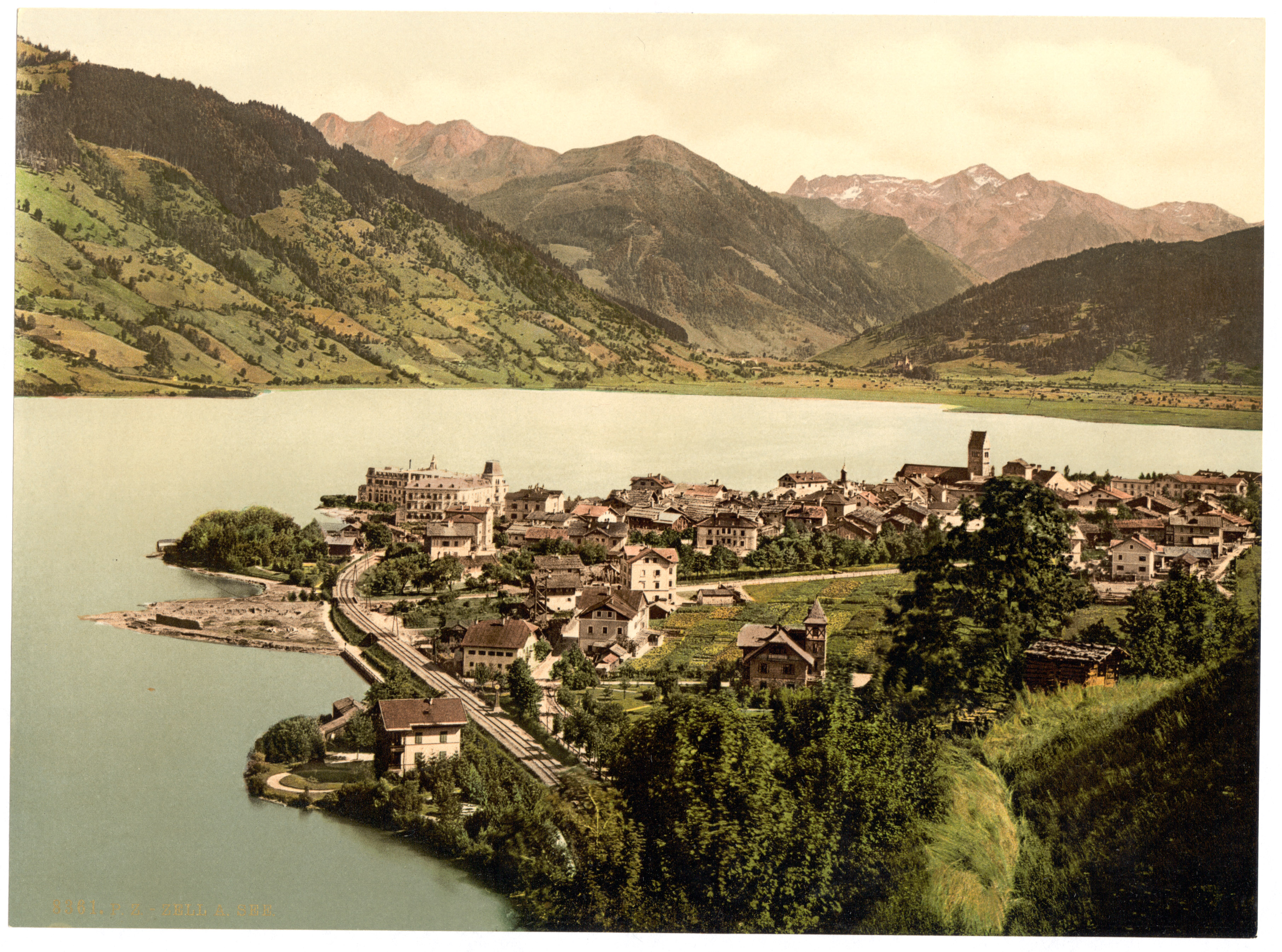
Zell about 1900

The area of Zell am See was continuously populated at least since Roman times. About 740 AD, by order of Bishop Johannes (John) I of Salzburg, monks founded the village within the stem duchy of Bavaria, which was mentioned as Cella in Bisonzio in a 743 deed. The denotation Cella or German: Zelle refers to a monk's cell in the sense of a monastery, Bisonzio is the name of the Pinzgau region. Zell received the rights of a market town in 1357. During the German Peasants' War in 1526, the area was a site of heavy fighting against the troops of Swabian League. The Zell am See citizens had not participated in the uprising, nevertheless 200 years later, numerous Protestant inhabitants were expelled from Salzburg by order of Prince-Archbishop Count Leopold Anton von Firmian.

From 1800, the town was occupied by French troops during the Napoleonic Wars. After the secularisation of the Salzburg Archbishopric, "Zell am See" finally passed to the Austrian Empire by resolution of the Vienna Congress in 1816. When in 1850 neighbouring Saalfelden became the capital of the Pinzgau district, the town's mayor successfully strived for relocating the administrative seat to Zell. The town's development was decisively promoted by the opening of the Salzburg-Tyrol Railway line (Giselabahn) on 30 July 1875, starting the annual summer tourism season. In 1885, Empress Elisabeth ‘Sissi’ visited the Schmittenhöhe, later in 1893 Emperor Franz Joseph I visited Zell am See. Zell am See received city rights on 24 January 1928.

The First World War brought an abrupt halt to the economic upturn in Zell am See. 270 men were drafted, 62 died. War memorials commemorate this time. Everyday life was characterised by food rationing and the accommodation of the wounded. The double-track extension of the Western Railway led to conflicts and interventions in the townscape. Mayor Josef Wisgrill saved Elisabethpark from being built on. After the war, Anton Gassner took over the office.

The election victory of the Social Democrats in 1919 was followed by eventful years. In 1928 Zell am See became a town, supported by the construction of the Schmittenhöhebahn railway, a tourist attraction. Political tensions led to unstable conditions from 1931 onwards. During the Nazi era, Zell was the scene of deportations, forced labour and Aryanisation. Towards the end of the war, the population rose sharply due to refugees. In April 1945, evacuation measures were carried out for the Nazi government, the Reich ministries and the security apparatus in Berlin during the Battle of Berlin. Only Hermann Göring went to southern Germany with his staff after Hitler had decided to remain in Berlin on 22 April. The majority of the staff to be evacuated were to head north. At the beginning of May 1945, the last Nazi government was formed in Flensburg. Although the Alpine Fortress propagated by leading National Socialists was a mirage, towards the end of the war a few evacuated Wehrmacht headquarters were located in Mittersill, Niedernsill, Maria Alm and Zell am See, while the Oberkommando der Luftwaffe (OKW) moved to Hotel Bellevue in Thumersbach, a district of Zell am See.

In 1945, American troops marched in and the town was administered and democratised. The post-war period saw reconstruction and economic recovery. New schools, lifts and infrastructure projects contributed to the development. Shipping was expanded and Zell am See established itself as a leading tourist destination. A catastrophic storm in 1966 claimed lives and great efforts were made to rebuild the town.

In the 1960s and 1970s, important projects such as the renovation of Rosenberg Castle and the creation of a pedestrian zone were realised. Zell hosted Alpine World Cup races, and access to the Schmittenhöhe was improved with the construction of the Zell mountain railway. The long-awaited Schmitten Tunnel was opened in 1996, solving the town's traffic problem.

Today, Zell am See is a tourist stronghold with over two million overnight stays every year. Together with the municipality of Kaprun, Zell am See forms the Zell am See-Kaprun region, which is considered one of the most important tourist centres in Austria. Alongside Vienna, Zell am See is one of the most popular destinations for Arab guests in Austria. Families, especially from Kuwait and the United Arab Emirates, stay for up to six weeks to escape the very hot summer in their home country.

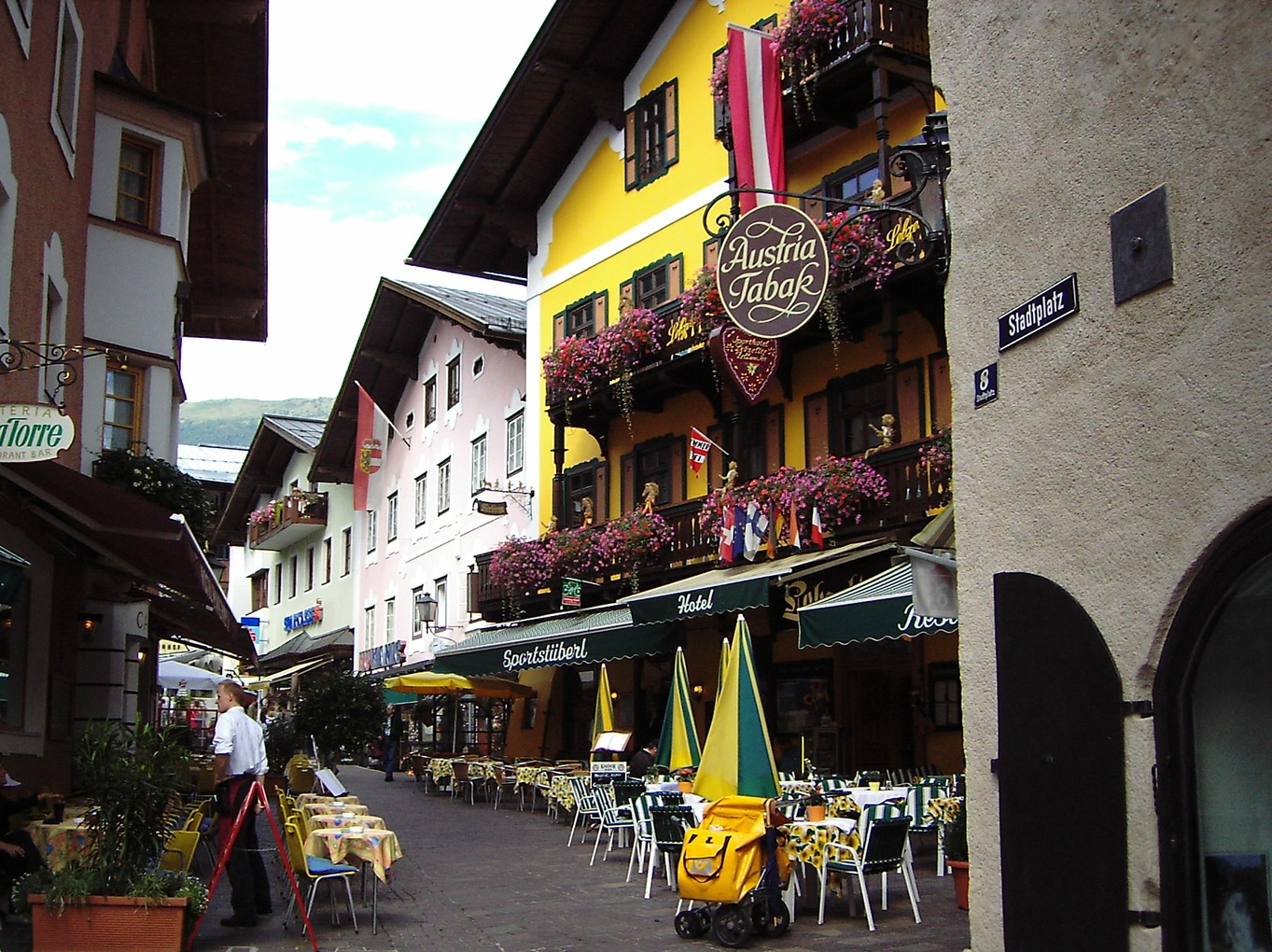
Dreifaltigkeitsgasse, Zell am See

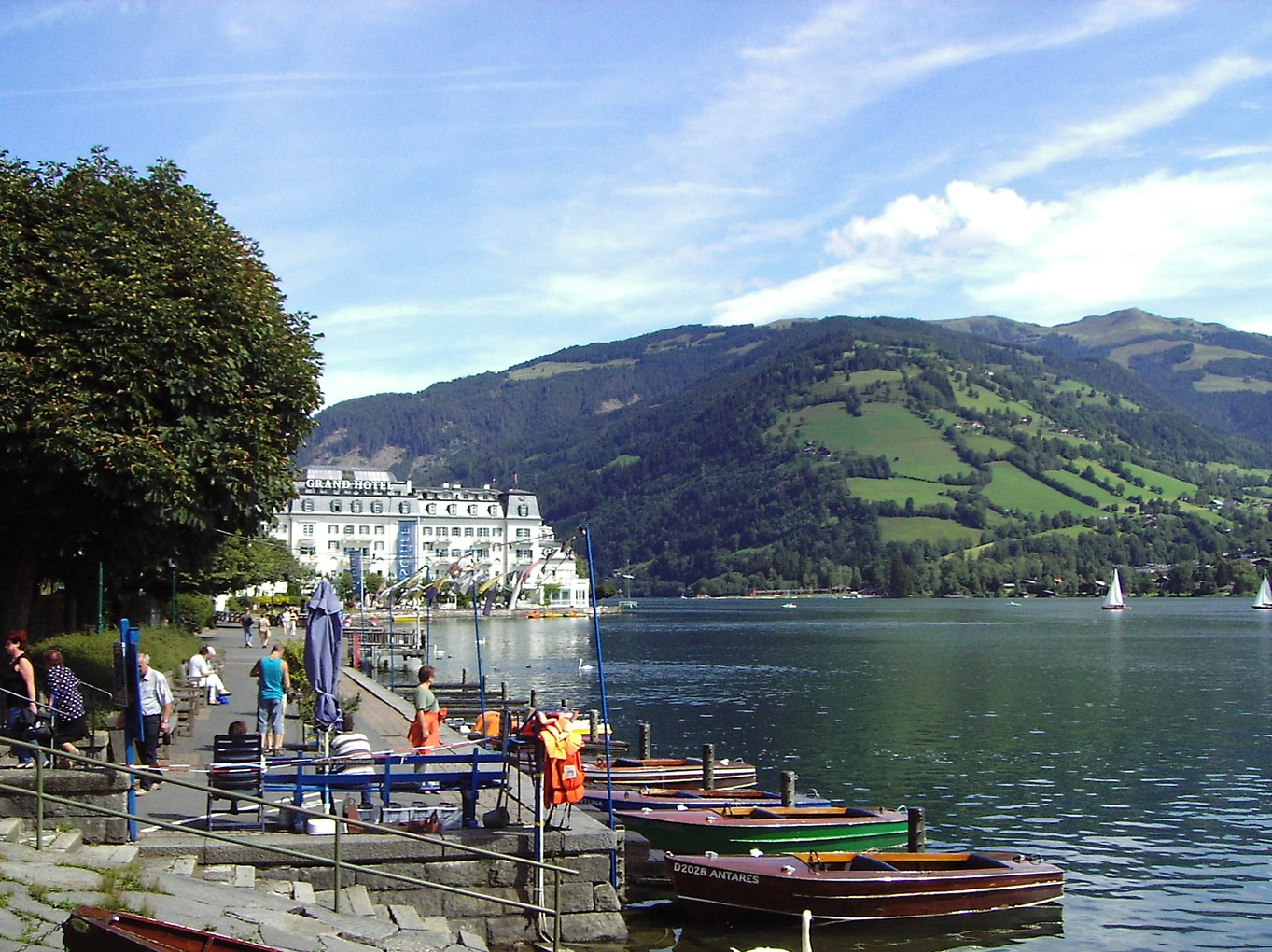
Lakeside walk

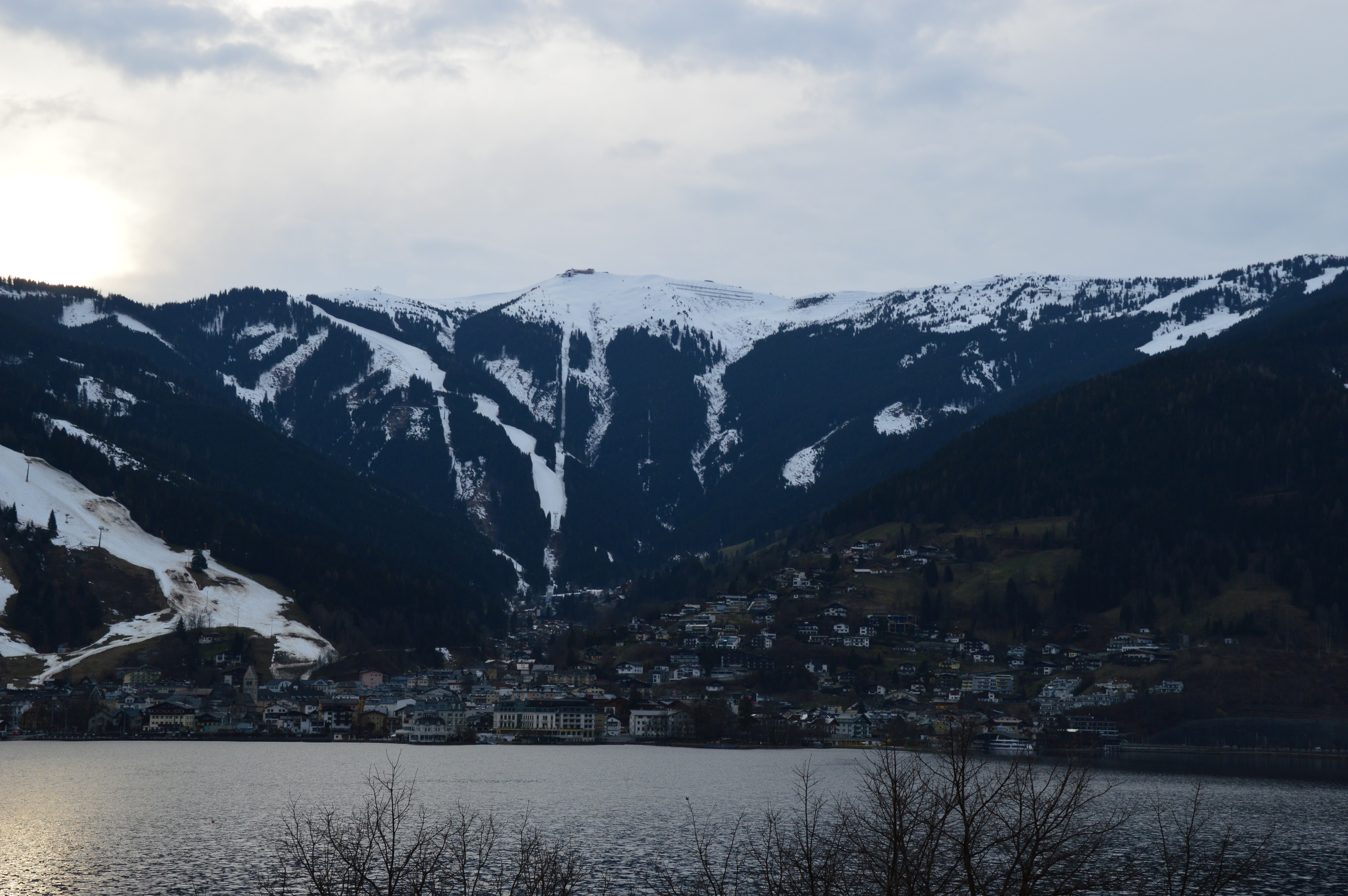
View of Zell am See from Thumersbach

== Attractions ==
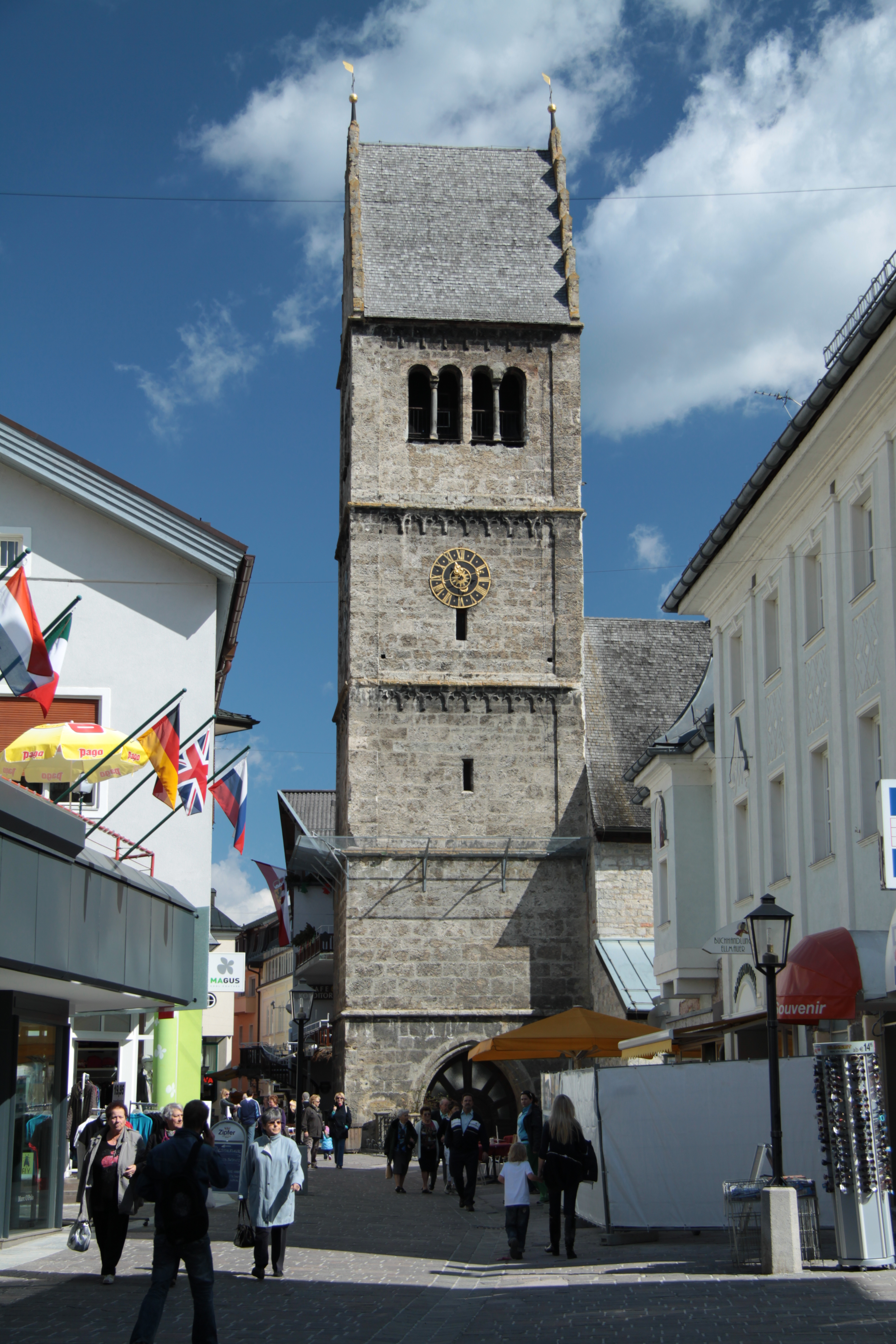
Tower of the church

St Hippolyte's Church - Within St Hippolyte's Church are the oldest known building remnants of the Pinzgau region. The church is built in a mostly Romanesque style and consists of three naves. Before 1794, the central nave was crowned with a Gothic vault, but in that year it was replaced with another vault, which in turn was replaced by a flat wooden roof in 1898. Four steps lead up to the main altar, but the crypt has been filled in. The narthex and aisles are still Gothic, but some of the other Gothic objects (like the neogothic altars by Josef Bachlehner) were added during the renovation in 1898, when also the baroque furnishings of preceding centuries were removed.

The highpoint of the church is its elevated walkway with its ornate parapet, built in 1514. The walkway rests on four carved columns of precious marble, in between which an intricate net-vault is spun. The three pointed arches are crowned with crockets, and end in pointed towers. Between the arches are Gothic baldachins with cut-out figures of St Hippolyte and St Florian, originating from 1520.

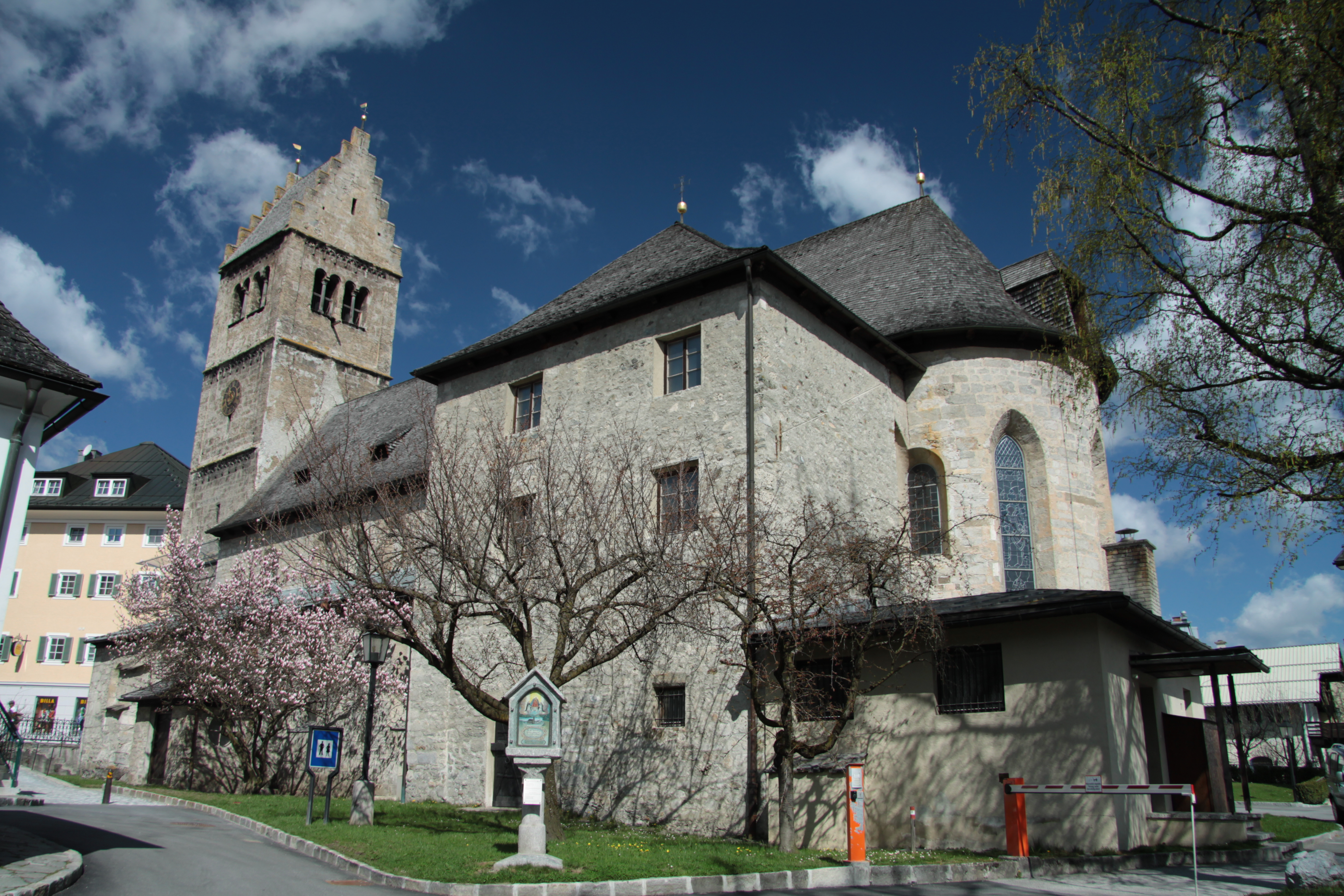
St Hippolyte's Church

The tower is the main focus of the Zell am See skyline. It has a height of 36 metres (118 ft). The strong walls have a limestone exterior.

From 1660 until 1670, the main altar was replaced by a Baroque one, which was removed again in 1760. Almost none of the Baroque furnishings of the church remain apart from some adornments. Two Baroque statues ended up in the church of Prielau. Next to the main altar are two statues dating from 1480: St Rupert and St Vigilius. The side altar contains an image of the Virgin Mary from the now non-existent Church of Maria Wald, which dates from 1540. The left nave has a small altar dedicated to St Sebastian in its apsis.

The Grand Hotel Zell am See is a 4-star hotel and a landmark for the town of Zell am See. Built between 1894 and 1896 in the Belle Époque style, the hotel building is located in the town centre on the easternmost tip of the Zell peninsula directly on the lakeshore and can be seen from almost anywhere on the lake. The striking, elongated building stands out above all with its snow-white façade and mansard roof.

The Rosenberg Castle is a castle in the centre of the city. It has been the seat of the mayor and the town council since 1970. The southern Bavarian influence can be seen in the square ground plan with the four corner towers and the round centre tower.

The Prielau Castle is a former prince-bishop's hunting lodge on the northern shore of Lake Zell. Since 1987, the castle has been owned by the Porsche family, who converted it into a hotel.

The Vogtturm is the oldest building in the city alongside St Hippolyte's Church. Today, the tower houses the city museum with special exhibitions on five floors.

The Schüttgut, the family estate of the Porsche–Piëch family, is located in Zell am See, having been obtained in 1939 by the senior Ferdinand Porsche in anticipation of the war. During the war, he transferred some of his business operations here and to Gmünd, away from Stuttgart where, notwithstanding the heavy bombing, his son Ferry Porsche remained to oversee plant operations.

== Politics ==
The current mayor of Zell am See, since 2019, is Andreas Wimmreuter (SPÖ).

The district council is composed as follows (as of 2024):

- Social Democratic Party of Austria (SPÖ): 11 seats
- Austrian People's Party (ÖVP): 8 seats
- Austrian Green Party (Grüne): 3 seats
- Freedom Party of Austria (FPÖ): 3 seats

== Festivals and events ==
The following festivals and events have taken place or are taking place in Zell am See:

- Zeller Seefest ("Lake Zell Festival"), the municipal folk festival that has been held since 1875
- Austrian Alpine Ski Championships (1932, 1935, 1975)
- Academic World Winter Games 1937
- Trasslauf ("Trass run"), an alpine ski run on the Trass, which has been taking place since 1951
- Alpine Ski World Cup races (1973-1980)
- ATP Challenger Zell am See (1979-1981)
- TriZell Triathlon, a triathlon competition held in and around the city since 1986
- Icehockey World Tournament, an international youth ice hockey tournament that has been held in Zell am See since 1992
- FIS Snowboard World Cup races (1994-2000)
- 2002 UCI Mountain Bike & Trials World Championships, hosted together with Kaprun
- Vespa Alp Days, an international Vespa meeting that has been taking place in Zell am See since 2010
- Ironman 70.3 Zell am See-Kaprun, an international long-distance triathlon tournament, which has been held since 2012
- Alpine Ski Europe Cup races (since 2013)
- Ironman 70.3 World Championship 2015
- Red Bull X-Alps, an international paragliding race, which has been held in Zell am See since 2021
- Red Bulls Salute, an international higher-level ice hockey tournament, organised by EC Red Bull Salzburg, has been held in Zell am See since 2023

== Education ==
In Zell am See there are three elementary schools, one high school, one special school, one vocational school, one grammar school, one commercial academy and a commercial school:

- Volksschule Zell am See
- Volksschule Schüttdorf (Prof. Dr. Ferdinand Porsche Gedächtnisschule)
- Volksschule Thumersbach
- Neue Mittelschule & Musikmittelschule Zell am See
- Sonderpädagogisches Zentrum (Dr. Ernst Höfer Schule)
- Polytechnische Schule Zell am See
- Landesberufsschule Zell am See
- Bundesgymnasium und Bundesrealgymnasium Zell am See
- Bundeshandelsakademie und Bundeshandelsschule Zell am See
- Schule für allgemeine Gesundheits- und Krankenpflege

== Films shot in Zell am See ==
- 1944/45: Film Ein Mann gehört ins Haus directed by Hubert Marischka.
- 1963: Film Allotria in Zell am See directed by Franz Marischka.
- 2001: Miniseries Band of Brothers "Part Ten - Points", directed by Mikael Salomon, executive producers Steven Spielberg and Tom Hanks.
- 2019: Film Landkrimi - Das dunkle Paradies, directed by Catalina Molina.

== Notable people ==
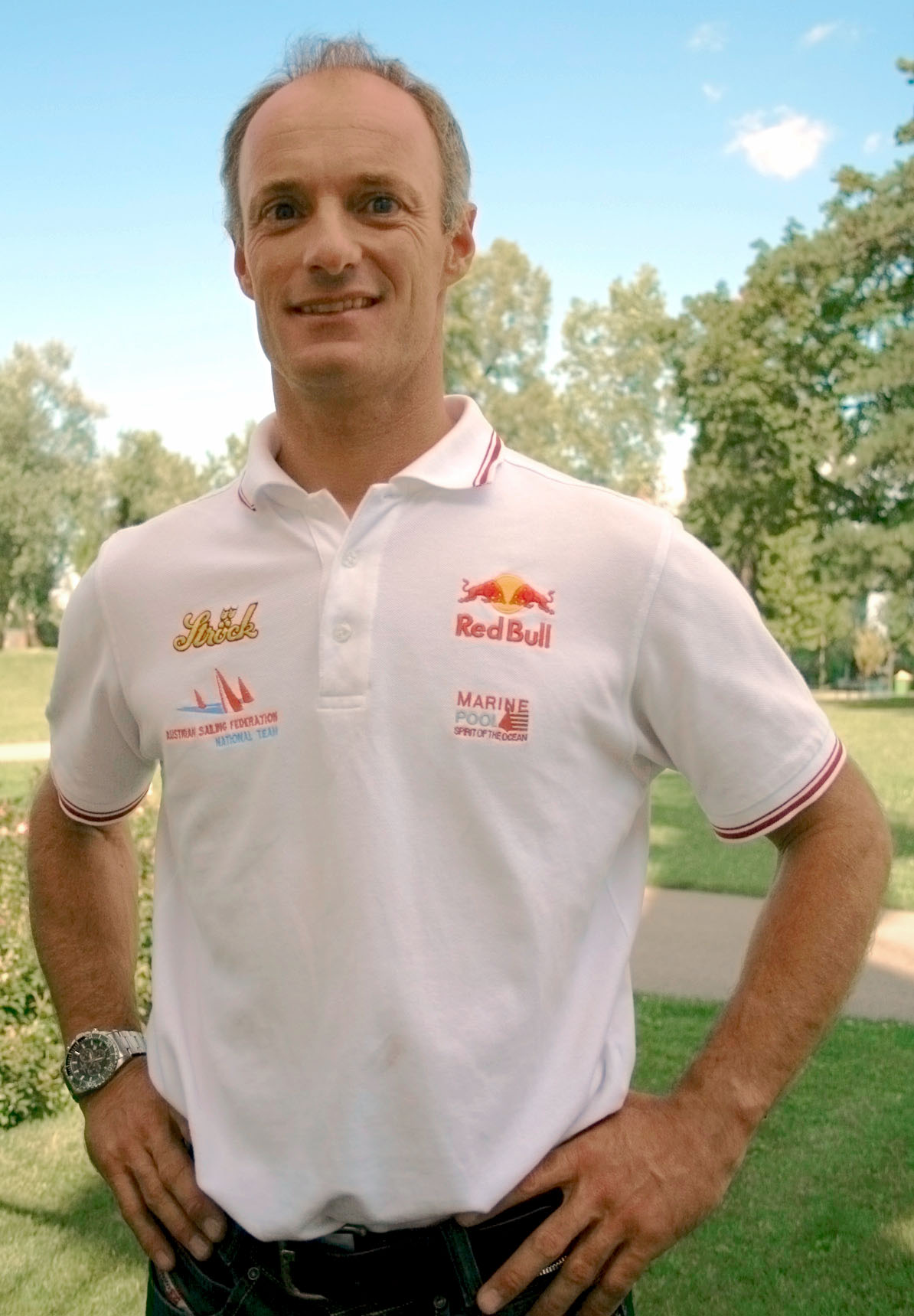
Hans-Peter Steinacher, 2008

=== People born in Zell am See ===
- Princess Maria Ana of Braganza (1899–1971), a member of the House of Braganza
- Maria Franziska von Trapp (1914–2014), daughter of Georg von Trapp and member of the Trapp Family singers
- Werner von Trapp (1915–2007), son of Georg von Trapp and member of the Trapp Family singers
- Hedwig Maria von Trapp (1917–1972), daughter of Georg von Trapp and member of the Trapp Family singers
- Hans Helmut Stoiber (1918–2015), Austrian poet
- Johanna von Trapp (1919–1994), daughter of Georg von Trapp and member of the Trapp Family singers
- Herbert Feuerstein (1937–2020), Austrian and German journalist, comedian and entertainer
- Wolf-Dieter Heiss (born 1939), Austrian neuroscientist at the University of Cologne
- Thomas Schäfer-Elmayer (born 1946), Austrian dancer and dance teacher
- Otto Brusatti (born 1948), Austrian radio personality and musicologist
- Titus Leber (born 1951), Austrian writer and film director
- Viktor Mayer-Schönberger (born 1966), Austrian academic at University of Oxford
- Wolfgang Ablinger-Sperrhacke (born 1967), Austrian operatic tenor
- Sebastian Schwaighofer (born 2000), Austrian politician

==== Sport ====
- Harald Ertl, (1948–1982), Austrian racing driver and journalist
- Hans-Peter Steinacher (born 1968), Austrian sailor and twice Olympic champion at the 2000 & 2004 Summer Olympics
- Elfriede Eder (born 1970), Austrian alpine skier
- Felix Gottwald (born 1976), Austrian Nordic combined athlete and the most successful athlete in Austrian Olympic history
- Wolfgang Schranz (born 1976), Austrian tennis player
- Doris Günther (born 1978), Austrian snowboarder
- Patrick Machreich (born 1980), Austrian ice hockey player
- Georg Streitberger (born 1981), Austrian alpine skier
- Simon Eder (born 1983), Austrian biathlete and twice team medalist at the Winter Olympics
- Bernd Hirschbichler (born 1984), Austrian football referee and educator
- Lukas Hollaus (born 1986), Austrian triathlete
- Christoph Schösswendter (born 1988), Austrian footballer
- Daniel Schorn (born 1988), Austrian road racing cycling
- Bernhard Tritscher (born 1988), Austrian cross-country skier
- Christopher Hörl (born 1989), Austrian-Moldovan alpine skier
- Bernadette Schild (born 1990), Austrian alpine skier
- Stefan Brennsteiner (born 1991), Austrian alpine skier
- Katharina Komatz (born 1991), Austrian biathlete
- Lukas Herzog (born 1993), Austrian ice hockey player
- Susanne Hoffmann (born 1994), Austrian biathlete
- Anna Meixner (born 1994), Austrian professional ice hockey player for the Ottawa Charge, four-time EWHL champion, and 2012 Winter Youth Olympic silver medalist
- Julia Leitinger (born 1996), Austrian biathlete
- Amar Dedić (born 2002), Bosnian football player

=== People who lived in Zell am See ===
- Anton Eleutherius Sauter (1800–1881), Austrian physician and botanist, from 1830 to 1836 k.k. district doctor in Zell am See
- Ferdinand Porsche (1875–1951), Austrian-Bohemian-German automotive engineer, Founder of the Porsche company, stayed in Zell am See at the end of the Second World War and was buried on the site of the Schüttgut in 1951
- Alfred Kubin (1877–1959), Austrian artist and illustrator, grew up in Zell am See for several years
- Stefan Zweig (1881–1942), Austrian writer, lived temporarily in Zell am See from 1923 to 1933
- Ferry Porsche (1909–1998), Austrian-German automobile designer, died in Zell am See and was buried on the grounds of the Schüttgut, honorary citizen of the city
- Otto Leodolter (1936–2020), Austrian ski jumper, bronze medallist at the 1960 Olympic Games, started competing for the Zell am See ski club in 1954
- Wolfgang Porsche (born 1943), German-Austrian manager, chairman of the Supervisory Board of Porsche AG and Porsche Automobil Holding SE since 2007 and member of the Supervisory Boards of Volkswagen AG and Audi AG, grew up in Zell am See, honorary citizen of the city
- Gerhard Seibold (born 1943), Austrian sprint canoeist, bronze medallist at the 1968 Olympic Games and world champion in 1970, taught physical education and sport as well as geography and economics at Gymnasium Zell am See from 1973 to 1999
- Keke Rosberg (born 1948), Finnish racing driver, Formula One World Drivers' Championship Winner 1982, owns a house in the Thumersbach district
- Roman Hagara (born 1966), Austrian sailor, twice Olympic champion at the 2000 & 2004 Summer Olympics, together with Hans-Peter Steinacher, competed for the Zell am See Yacht Club
- Marlies Raich (born 1981), Austrian alpine skier, four-time medallist at the Olympic Games and two-time world champion, attended the secondary school in Zell am See
- Thomas Vanek (born 1984), Austrian ice hockey player, NHL player, including for the Buffalo Sabres, grew up in Zell am See and played for EK Zell am See in the junior section
- Nico Rosberg (born 1985), German-Finnish racing driver, Formula One World Drivers' Championship Winner 2016, spent a lot of time in his childhood at his father's house in Thumersbach and attended the Zell kindergarten for a year
- Sam Maes (born 1998), Belgian alpine skier, grew up in Zell am See and still lives there today, started for the Zell am See ski club

== See also ==
- Salzburger Land
- Pinzgauer Lokalbahn
