= Schüttdorf =

- Neighborhood of Zell am See
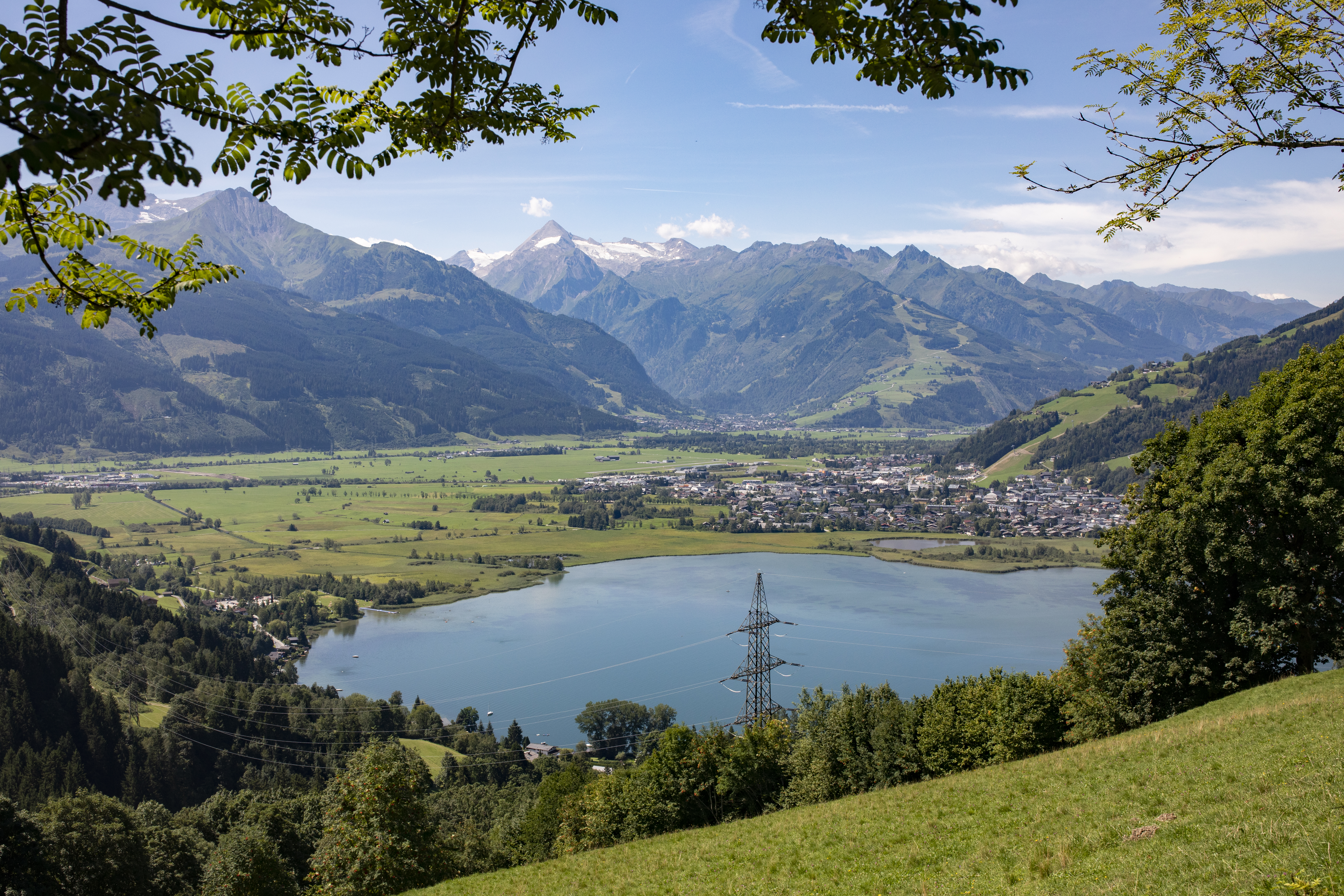
- Schüttdorf
- Interactive map of Schüttdorf
- Coordinates: 47°18′12″N 12°47′35″E
- Country: Austria

The city district Schüttdorf is the most populous part, with approximately 5,400 inhabitants, of the district capital Zell am See.

== Commercial ==
=== Present and future ===
The Prof. Ferdinand Porsche-Street, and the Gletschermoosstreet was joined in the spring of 2008 with a new roadway.

=== Kitzsteinhorn-Street ===
As the largest part of Zell am See, Schüttdorf has experienced a boom through the settlement of different companies. The Kitzsteinhorn-Street has developed in recent years to a shopping street.

== Infrastructure ==
In Schüttdorf, there is a seniors housing complex, a youth center, a sports complex, a beach and tennis courts.

=== Education ===
In Schüttdorf, there is one elementary school, a grammar school, a special school, a polytechnic, a commercial college and a business school:

- Schüttdorf Elementary school (Prof. Dr. Ferdinand Porsche memorial school)
- General special
- Zell am See Technical school
- Zell am See Grammar School
- Federal Commercial

== Transportation ==
=== Zell am See Airport ===
There is an airport (ICAO LOWZ) with paved runway, as well as a hangar, terminal and tower. Currently, the airfield for sport and private jets will be used. There are plans to rebuild the airfield.

=== PLB ===
Schüttdorf is connected to the network of Pinzgauer Lokalbahn (operators SLB).

Stops of the PLB in South Zell:

- Tischlerhäusl
- Kitzsteinhornstraße
- Areitbahn
