= Lake Zell =

Lake in Salzburg, Austria

Lake Zell (Zeller See)
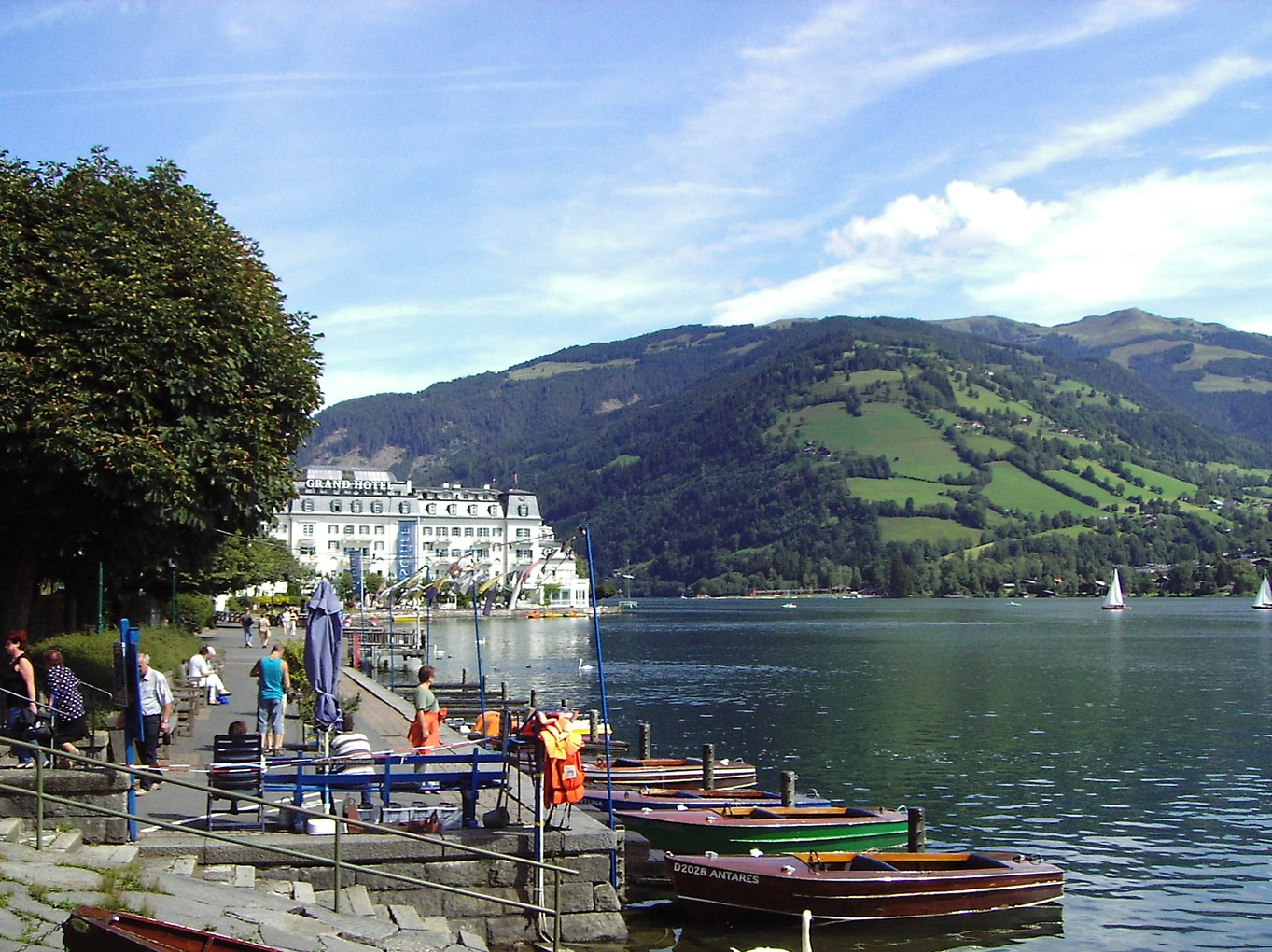

- Location within Austria
- Location: Salzburg
- Coordinates: 47°19′N 12°48′E
- Primary inflows: Schmittenbach, Thumersbach
- Primary outflows: Salzach
- Basin countries: Austria
- Max. length: 4 km (2.5 mi)
- Max. width: 1.5 km (0.93 mi)
- Max. depth: 73 m (240 ft)
- Surface elevation: 750 m (2,460 ft)
- Settlements: Zell am See

Lake Zell (German: Zeller See; Italian: Lago di Zell) is a small freshwater lake in the Austrian Alps. It takes its name from the city of Zell am See, which is located on a small delta protruding into the lake. The lake is 4 kilometres (2.5 mi) long and 1.5 kilometres (0.93 mi) across at its widest. It is up to 73 metres deep and at an elevation of 750 metres above sea level.

The lake is fed by numerous small mountain streams in summer, but only one stream flows out of it into the Salzach. In winter the lake completely freezes and is used for winter sports. In summer the lake is used for pleasure boating (boats powered by combustion engines are not allowed except for the ferries that cross the width of the lake from Zell to Thumersbach, so electrically powered boats can be rented instead). The water is very clear and suitable for swimming or diving, but can be chilly.

The southern end of the lake, near Schüttdorf, is shallower and mostly filled with water weed, making it unsuitable for boating or swimming.

This "Alpine Lake" can be seen from nearby ski trails.
