= Pinzgauer Lokalbahn =

Coordinates: 47°17′01″N 12°28′53″E

Zell am See–Krimml
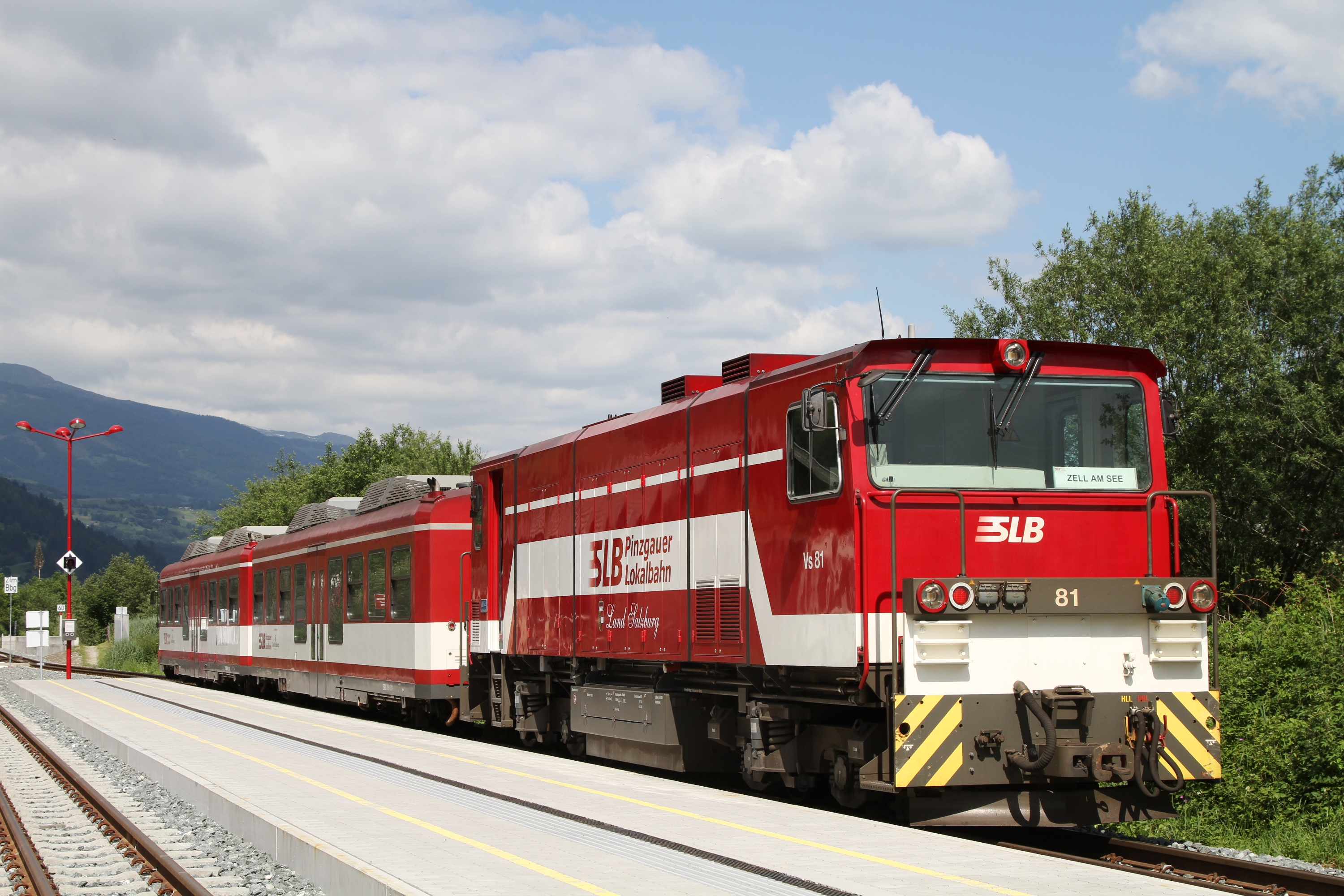
- New push-pull train with loco Vs 81 in Bramberg station

Overview
- Line number: 267 01

Service
- Route number: 230

Technical
- Line length: 52.611 km (32.691 mi)
- Track gauge: 760 mm (2 ft 5 15/16 in)
- Operating speed: 70 km/h (43 mph) max.

The Pinzgauer Lokalbahn (formerly Pinzgaubahn or Krimmler Bahn) is a narrow-gauge railway in Salzburg in Austria. The 53-kilometre (33 mi) railway follows the Salzach valley from Zell am See to Krimml through the Pinzgau mountains. The section between Mittersill and Krimml was damaged by flooding in 2005 and reopened in September 2010.

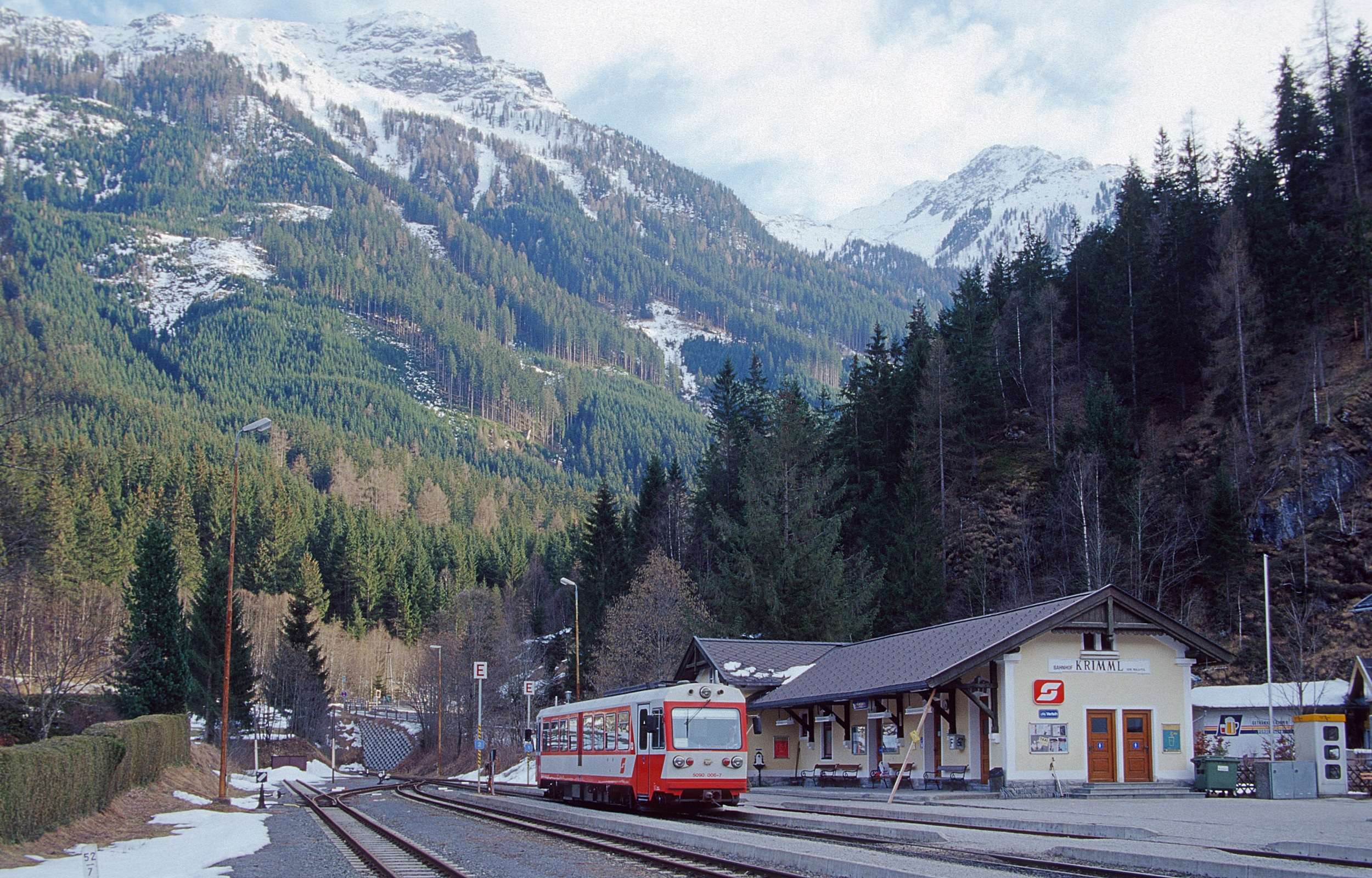
Railcar in Krimml

== See also ==
- Rail transport in Austria
