= Lucking =

Lucking or Luecking is a surname, and may refer to:

- Alfred Lucking (1856–1929), American politician
- William Lucking (1941–2021), American film, television, and stage actor
- Robert Lücking (born 1964), German lichenologist
- Juliana Luecking, musician, American spoken-word artist and video maker

== See also ==
- Luckin (surname)
- Luckin Coffee
- Luck (disambiguation)
- Lück (disambiguation)
- Lucks (disambiguation)
- Lucky (disambiguation)
