= Lücke =

Lücke, Luecke, or Lucke, is a surname. Notable people with the surname include:

- Bernd Lucke (born 1962), German economist and politician (AfD)
- Fritz Lucke (1902–1991), German journalist
- Georg Albert Lücke (1829–1894), German surgeon
- Gottfried Christian Friedrich Lücke (1791–1855), German theologian
- Hannfried Lucke (born 1964), German organist
- Heinz Lucke (born 1953), West German canoer
- John Edwin Luecke, American mathematician
- John F. Luecke (1889–1952), American politician from Michigan
- Jörg Lucke (born 1942), East German rower
- Karsten Lucke (born 1974), German politician
- Martin Lucke (born 1988), German politician
- Paul Lücke (1914–1976), German politician (CDU)
- Steve Luecke (born 1950), American politician from Indiana

== See also ==
- Lück
