= Helene Wildbrunn =

Austrian opera singer (1882–1972)

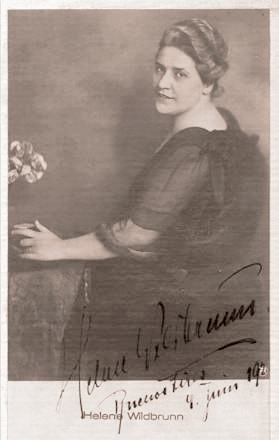
- Wildbrunn c. 1920
- Born: Helene Wehrenfennig; 8 April 1882; Vienna, Austria
- Died: 10 April 1972 (aged 90); Vienna, Austria
- Occupations: Operatic contralto and soprano; Academic teacher
- Organizations: Stadttheater Dortmund; Berlin State Opera; Städtische Oper Berlin; Vienna State Opera; Vienna Music Academy

Leonore Helene Wildbrunn (born Helene Wehrenfennig; 8 April 1882 – 10 April 1972) was an Austrian operatic soprano. She was a celebrated Wagnerian singer, possessing a wide vocal range and dramatic creativity and fine sense of style. She made her debut in 1907 at the Stadttheater Dortmund as a contralto and mezzo-soprano. She performed at the Stuttgart Court Opera from 1914 to 1918, the Berlin State Opera from 1919 to 1925, the Städtische Oper Berlin from 1925 to 1932, and the Vienna State Opera from 1919 until 1932. From 1932 to 1950, she only appeared as a concert singer, and taught at the Vienna Music Academy as a professor.

== Career ==
She was born Helene Wehrenfennig in Vienna in 1882, the daughter of a railway operator. She studied in Vienna at the Gesellschaft der Musikfreunde Conservatory under Rosa Papier-Paumgartner, who had earlier taught Anna Bahr-Mildenburg and Lucie Weidt. She was initially a contralto, but had a wide vocal range. She made her debut in 1907 at the Stadttheater Dortmund as an alto and mezzo-soprano. At the Dortmund theatre, she performed 23 different roles in one season, and in the 1913 season appeared as Waltraute, Erda and Fricka in Wagner's Der Ring des Nibelungen and as Brangäne in Tristan und Isolde. She married fellow opera singer Karl Wildbrunn (1873–1938) in 1914. Shortly afterwards, they moved to Stuttgart, where she became a member of the Stuttgart Court Opera. Here she developed to a soprano, performing the roles of Rezia in Weber's Oberon, Brünnhilde in Siegfried and Götterdämmerung, Valentine in Les Huguenots, Kundry in Wagner's Parsifal and the Marschallin in Der Rosenkavalier by Richard Strauss. From 1919 to 1925 she performed at the Staatsoper Berlin, from 1925 to 1932 at the Städtische Oper Berlin, and from 1919 until 1932 at the Vienna State Opera. During this time she was invited to opera houses in the world, including the Teatro Colón in Buenos Aires, by an invitation of Felix Weingartner. At La Scala in Milan she appeared as Kundry and Brünnhilde, alongside Lotte Lehmann, Walter Kirchhoff, Emil Schipper and Carl Braun. Isolde is regarded as her greatest role.

From 1932 to 1950, she appeared as a concert singer, and was a professor at the Vienna Music Academy. Wildbrunn possessed a wide vocal range, with dark colours and dramatic creativity in her voice. She died in April 1972 at age 90. Her tomb is located in the Neustifter Friedhof cemetery of Vienna (Group J, row 1, number 1).
