= Liane Synek =

Austrian opera singer (1922–1982)

- Born: 17 September 1922; Vienna
- Died: 6 September 1982 (aged 59); Hollabrunn
- Occupation: Operatic soprano
- Organizations: Hessisches Staatstheater Wiesbaden; Staatsoper Berlin; Cologne Opera

Liane Synek (17 September 1922 – 6 September 1982) was an Austrian operatic soprano. She made a career based in Germany, at the Hessisches Staatstheater Wiesbaden, the Staatsoper Berlin and the Cologne Opera, and appeared at international major opera houses and festivals, such as the Bayreuth Festival. She appeared mostly in dramatic roles such as Beethoven's Fidelio, and Wagner's Sieglinde, Brünnhilde and Isolde. She also performed in contemporary operas, creating the role of Countess de la Roche in Zimmermann's Die Soldaten in Cologne in 1965, conducted by Michael Gielen.

== Career ==
Born in Vienna, where she studied with Helene Wildbrunn and Anna Bahr-Mildenburg. In 1950, she won a singing competition in Vienna. She was a member of the Theater Würzburg from 1951, moved to the Opernhaus Wuppertal the following season, and in 1954 to the Hessisches Staatstheater Wiesbaden, where she remained for the rest of her career. She made had a contract also with the Staatsoper Berlin from 1958 to 1971, and with the Cologne Opera from 1962 to 1975. In Cologne, she appeared in the title role of Beethoven's Fidelio. On 15 February 1965, she created there the role of the Countess de la Roche in the world premiere of Bernd Alois Zimmermann's opera Die Soldaten. The performance, with Edith Gabry as Marie, and conducted by Michael Gielen, was recorded, and the recording won the award Grand Prix du Disque.

Synek appeared often with the Frankfurt Opera, including a guest performance of the company in 1963 at Sadler's Wells Opera in London, again playing Fidelio. She was also a frequent guest at the Vienna State Opera. Her roles there included Ursula in Hindemith's Mathis der Maler and Amelia in Verdi's Un ballo in maschera in 1958, Chrysothemis in Elektra by Richard Strauss in 1960, Venus in Wagner's Tannhäuser in 1972, Kundry in his Parsifal, Brünnhilde in his Die Walküre in 1974, and the title role in von Einem's Der Besuch der alten Dame (opera) in 1980.

She appeared at the Bayreuth Festival first in 1951, singing in the choir. From 1965 to 1970, she appeared there as Helmwige in Die Walküre, from 1968 also as the First Norn in Götterdämmerung.

She appeared as a guest internationally, appearing at the Paris Opera in 1959 as Elisabeth in Tannhäuser. She was a guest at the Teatro Nacional de São Carlos in Lisbon and at the Theatro Municipal of Rio de Janeiro in 1961. The following year, she sang in Fidelio at the Teatro di San Carlo in Naples, and was Brünnhilde in Wagner's Der Ring des Nibelungen at La Monnaie in Brussels. She performed in Rome, Turin and Parma in the 1962/63 season. In 1963, she performed as Sieglinde in Die Walküre at La Scala in Milan, and appeared at the Grand Théâtre de Bordeaux. She sang Schoenberg's monodrama Erwartung at the Maggio Musicale Fiorentino festival in 1964. She appeared at the Teatro Comunale Bologna and La Fenice in Venice in 1965, at the Staatsoper Dresden and the Bavarian State Opera in Munich in 1967, at the Grand Théâtre de Genève in 1968, at the Budapest Opera and the Sofia Opera in 1970, and at the Grand Theatre in Warsaw 1974.

Her repertoire also included the title role of Verdi's Aida, Lady Macbeth in his Macbeth, Abigail in his Nabucco, the Marschallin in Der Rosenkavalier by Richard Strauss, the title role of Puccini's Turandot, and Isolde in Wagner's Tristan und Isolde.

She died in Hollabrunn. A street in Wiesbaden is named after her.
