= Internationale Sommerakademie Mozarteum Salzburg =

Austrian summer school

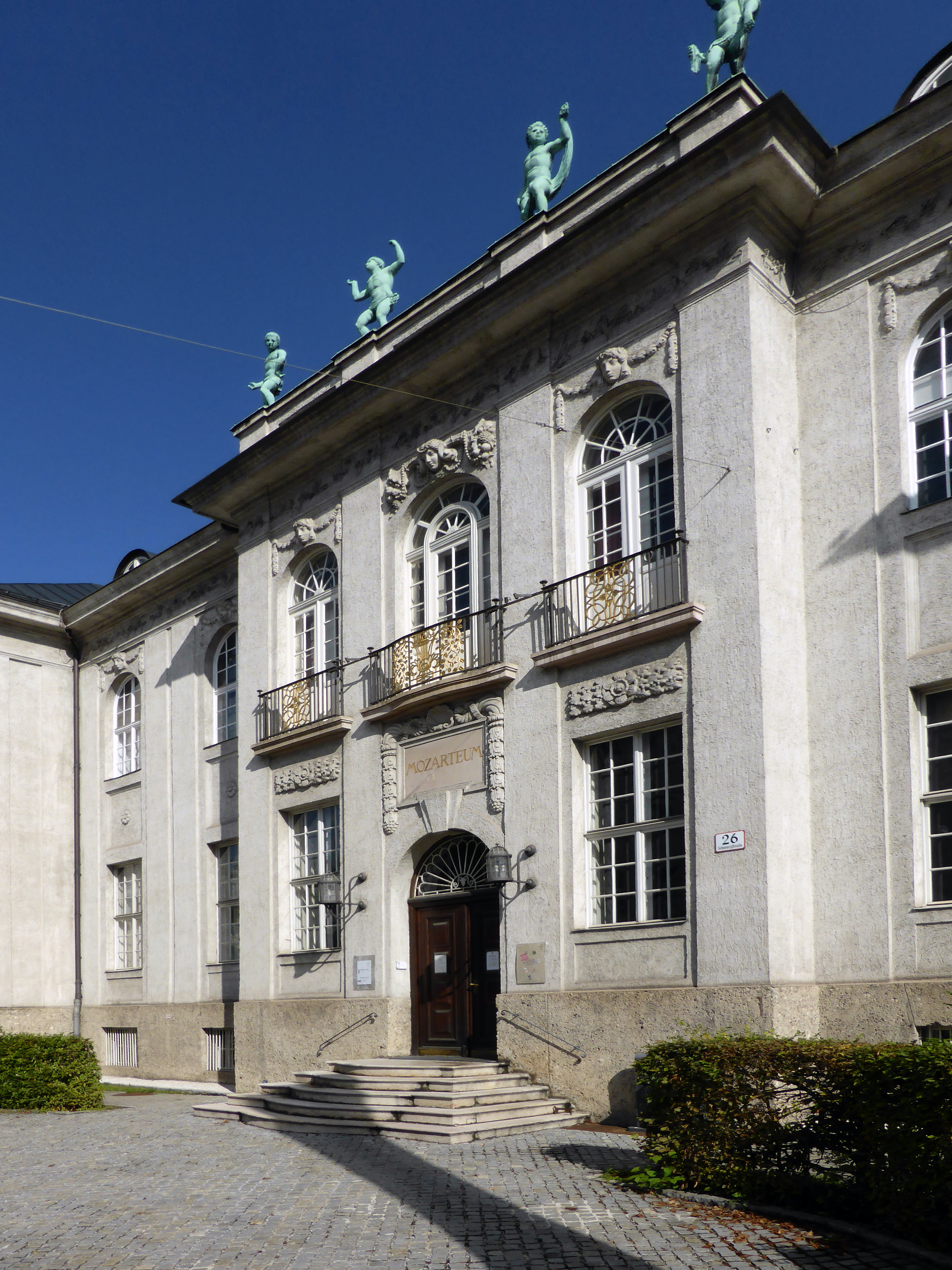
Building of the International Mozarteum Foundation, Schwarzstraße 26 (built 1911–1914), with classrooms of the Mozarteum University Salzburg

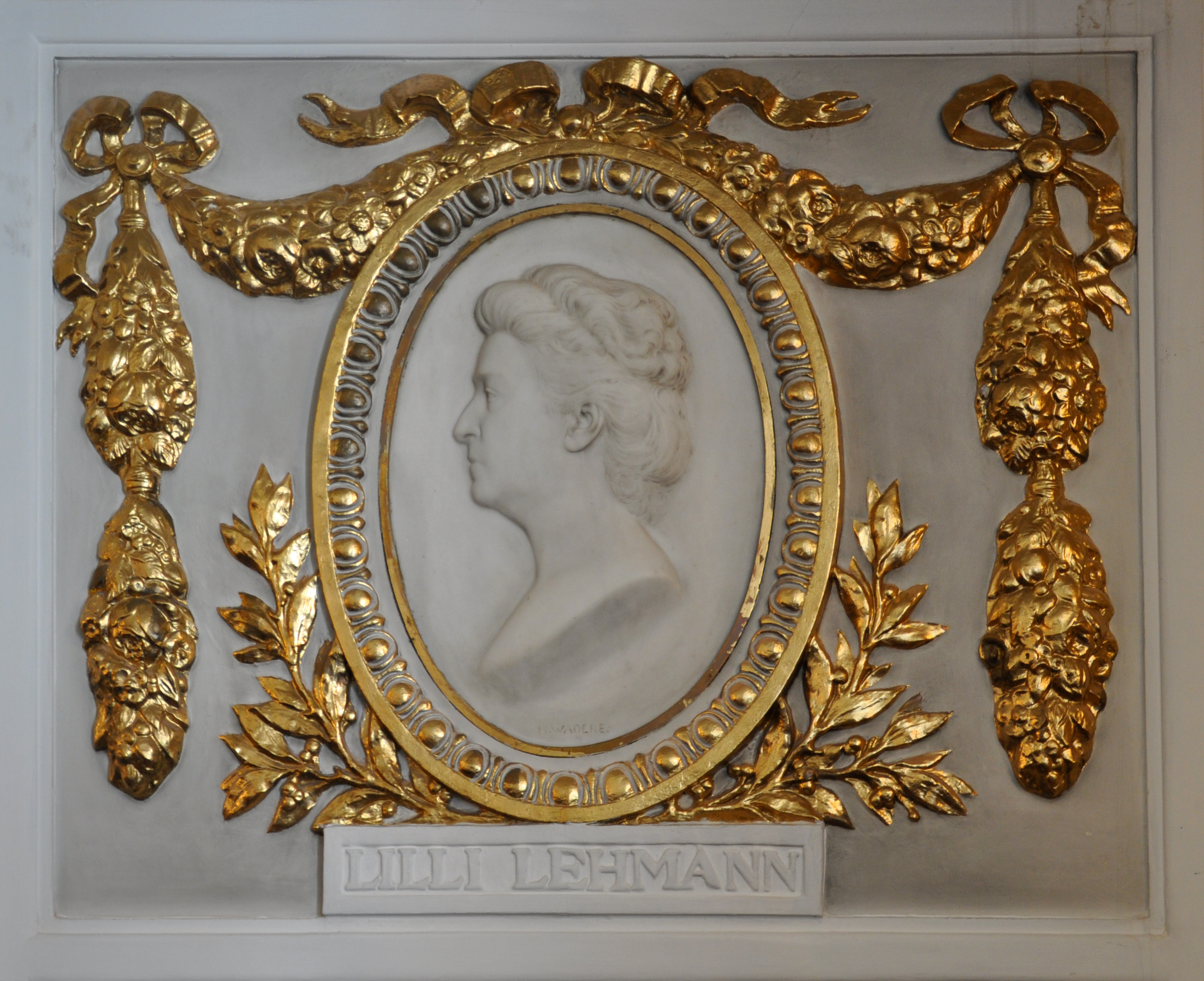
Lilli Lehmann, Relief im Großen Saal des Mozarteums, Schwarzstraße 28

The Mozarteum International Summer Academy goes back to its beginnings in the summer of 1916 and has borne its current name since 1947. Today, more than 80 masterclasses are held annually. These are run by teachers of the Mozarteum University Salzburg and selected, internationally renowned artists and are attended by 800–1000 young musicians from all over the world.

== History ==
From 1916 to 1928 (not continuous) the singer Lilli Lehmann used the summer months for private masterclasses at the Salzburg Mozarteum; the center point of these classes were the Mozart renditions. In 1925, the violinist Willy Schweyda, who worked previously in Salzburg but at this time worked in Prague, joined. In Summer 1929, after the death of Lilli Lehmann, the conductor Julian Friedman led an orchestra academy especially for American students, along with courses in musical dramatic acting, piano, and composition. From 1930 to 1937 the program was called "Musical Summer Courses", from 1937 to 1940 "Mozarteum's Summer Academy for Music, Theater, and Dance". From 1940 to 1944 a "Summer Academy for Foreigners at the Mozarteum" took place, with less popularity due to wartime policies. In 1947 the conductor Bernhard Paumgartner reorganized the course offering, now under the name "International Summer Academy at Mozarteum" and together with Eberhard Preußner took over leadership. In 1960 Preußner followed as the sole leader, then came Heinz Scholz in 1965, Robert Wagner in 1966, Paul Schilhawsky in 1972, Rolf Liebermann in 1983, Peter Lang in 1988, Paul Roczek in 1991, Alexander Mullenbach in 2003, Reinhart von Gutzeit in 2014, Siegfried Mauser together with Wolfgang Holzmair in 2015, Holzmair as sole leader in 2017 and Hannfried Lucke in 2019 .

== Spectrum ==
The range of courses on offer includes master classes in composition, conducting, singing, piano, guitar and the classical orchestra instruments, an orchestra academy and additional courses such as musical analysis, Alexander technique, Feldenkrais method, yoga, German and Italian. In addition, symposia and workshops, internal competitions and concerts take place.

== Teaching staff ==
Among the teachers of past International Summer Academies are

- the composers Luciano Berio, Boris Blacher, Friedrich Cerha, George Crumb, Franco Donatoni, Gottfried von Einem, Wolfgang Fortner, Sofia Gubaidulina, Cristóbal Halffter, Hans Werner Henze, Paul Hindemith, Mauricio Kagel, György Kurtág, Helmut Lachenmann, Bruno Maderna, Frank Martin, Carl Orff, Wolfgang Rihm, Alfred Schnittke, Kurt Schwertsik, Karlheinz Stockhausen, Viktor Suslin, Hans Zender and Udo Zimmermann,
- the conductors Wilhelm Furtwängler, Herbert von Karajan, Clemens Krauss, Erich Leinsdorf, Günther Ramin, Wolfgang Sawallisch, Hermann Scherchen, George Szell and Bruno Walter,
- the singers Arleen Augér, Walter Berry, Kim Borg, Grace Bumbry, Ileana Cotrubas, Werner Hollweg, Hans Hotter, Siegfried Jerusalem, Sena Jurinac, George London, Christa Ludwig, Rosa Papier, Julius Patzak, Thomas Quasthoff, Elisabeth Schwarzkopf, Graziella Sciutti, Irmgard Seefried, Giulietta Simionato, Rita Streich and Renata Tebaldi,
- the pianists Géza Anda, Friedrich Gulda, Claude Helffer, Kurt Leimer, Hans Leygraf, Tatiana Nikolayeva, Alexis Weissenberg and Dieter Zechlin, the harpsichordist Kenneth Gilbert and the guitarist Pepe Romero,
- the violinists Ivry Gitlis, Gidon Kremer, Yehudi Menuhin, Ruggiero Ricci, Wolfgang Schneiderhan, Ljerko Spiller, Max Strub, Tibor Varga and Sándor Végh, the violist Kim Kashkashian and the cellists Antonio Janigro, Enrico Mainardi, Zara Nelsova and Harvey Shapiro,
- the flutist Wolfgang Schulz (flute), the horn player Radovan Vlatković and
- the fencer Ellen Preis, the dancer Harald Kreutzberg, the actor Peter Ustinov and the director George Tabori.
