= Luck (disambiguation) =

Luck is a chance happening.

Luck may also refer to:

== Places ==
- Luck, North Carolina, United States
- Luck (town), Wisconsin, United States
  - Luck, Wisconsin, a village within the town
- Luck Lake, Highlands County, Florida, U.S.
- Luck Nunatak, Ellsworth Land, Antarctica
- Luck Point, Bay of Isles, South Georgia
- Lutsk, Ukraine (Polish: Łuck)

== People ==
- Lück, a German family name
- Luck (surname), a family name
- DJ Luck, of the British musical duo Luck & Neat
- Luck Mervil (born 1967), Haitian-Canadian actor and singer-songwriter

== Arts, entertainment, and media ==
=== Films ===
- Luck (1923 film), an American silent film directed by C.C. Burr
- Luck (1931 film), a French drama film
- Luck (2009 film), a Bollywood action thriller
- Luck (2022 film), an American animated comedy film

=== Music ===
- Luck (Jacob Yates and the Pearly Gate Lock Pickers album), 2011
- Luck (Tom Vek album), 2014
- Luck (soundtrack), from the 2022 film
- Luck, an album by Aco, 2012
- Luck, an album by the Storys 2010
- Luck, an EP by Minuit, 2000
- "Luck", a song by American Authors from Oh, What a Life, 2014
- "Luck", a song by Supersuckers from The Smoke of Hell, 1991

=== Other uses in arts, entertainment, and media ===
- "Luck" (short story), an 1886 story by Mark Twain
- Luck (TV series), a 2012 U.S. drama series about horse racing
- "Luck" (Drop the Dead Donkey), a television episode

== See also ==
- Bad luck (disambiguation)
- "Be Lucky", a 2014 song by The Who
- Good luck (disambiguation)
- Lucka (disambiguation)
- Lucks (disambiguation)
- Lucky (disambiguation)
- Moral luck
- Tough luck (disambiguation)
- "Unlucky", a song by Axium from The Story Thus Far
- "Unlucky", a song by Sponge from the 2005 album The Man
- "Unlucky", a song by IU from her 2019 EP Love Poem
