= Laucke =

Laucke is a surname. Notable people with the surname include:

- Condor Laucke (1914–1993), Australian politician
- Michael Laucke (1947–2021), Canadian classical and flamenco guitarist

== See also ==
- Lücke
