= Lucie Weidt =

Austrian opera singer

Lucie Weidt (May 11, 1876 – July 28, 1940) was a German-born Austrian dramatic soprano noted for her prowess in the operas of Richard Wagner.

Born in what is now Opava in Silesia, Weidt was the daughter of composer and Kapellmeister Heinrich Weidt, who was one of her first teachers, along with Rosa Papier. For most of her career she was on the roster of the Vienna State Opera, beginning in 1903 and continuing until 1926. She first succeeded Sophie Sedlmair, who was retiring, and soon began sharing major Wagner roles with Anna Bahr-Mildenburg. She also became known for her portrayal of Leonore in Fidelio, and she created for Vienna the Marschallin in Der Rosenkavalier. For Milan she was the first Kundry. Between 1908 and 1910 she appeared in Munich. During the 1910–11 season Weidt was on the roster of the Metropolitan Opera, singing Brünnhilde in both Die Walküre and Siegfried and Elisabeth in Tannhäuser. In 1912 she was singing in Buenos Aires. She won praise from Leoš Janáček for her portrayal of Kostelnička in Jenůfa at its Vienna premiere in 1918. The following year she created the role of the Nurse in Die Frau ohne Schatten for the same company. Weidt died in Vienna.

She left recordings for G&T (Vienna 1904) and Gramophone (Vienna 1909).
