= Wallersee =

Lake in Salzburg, Austria

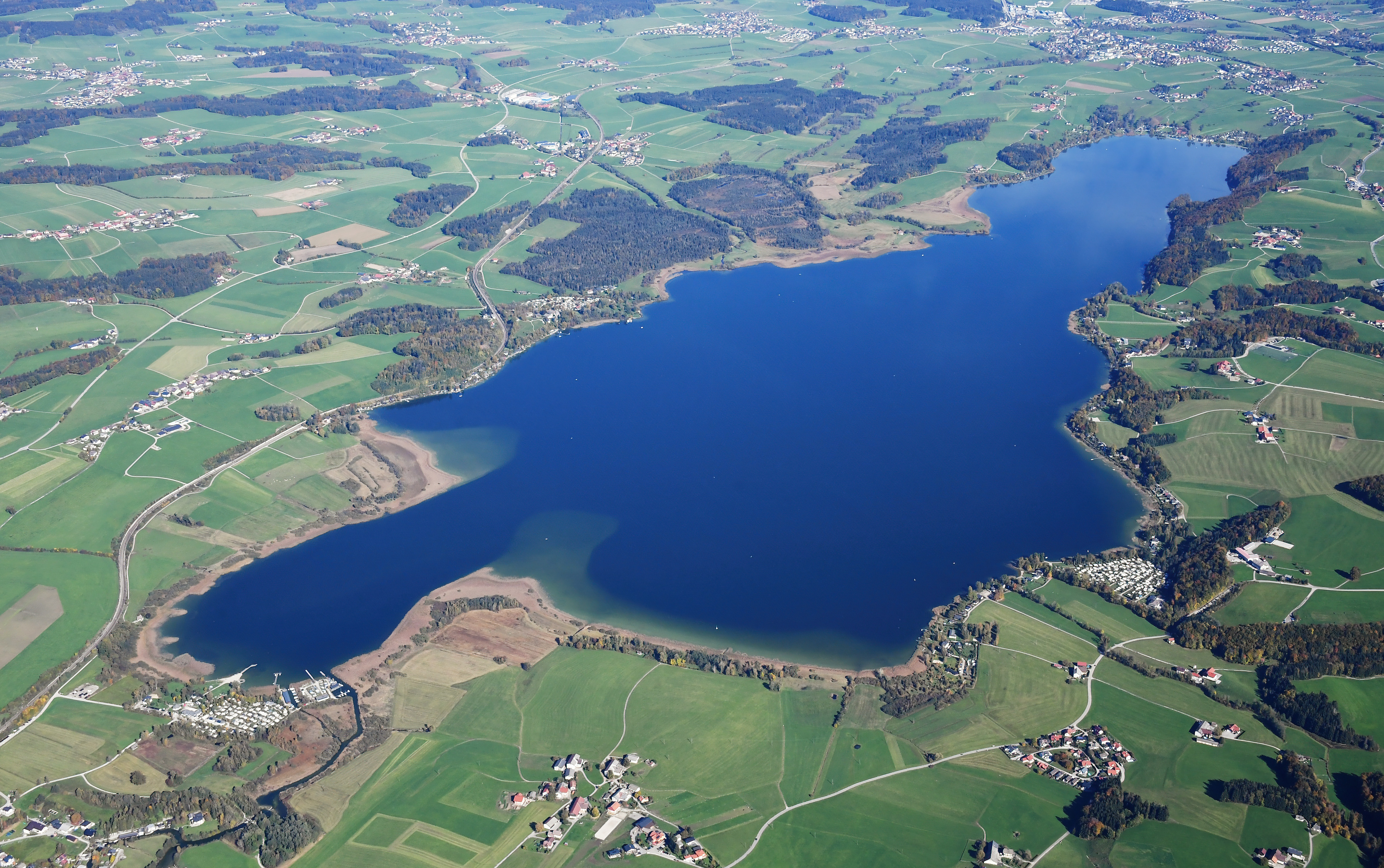
- Aerial view of the Wallersee from the southwest

- Location within Salzburg Location within Austria
- Location: AT-5
- Group: Salzburger Seengebiet
- Coordinates: 47°54′50″N 13°10′30″E
- Type: natural
- Part of: Salzach
- Primary inflows: Altbach
- Primary outflows: Fischach
- Basin countries: Austria
- Water volume: 76,300,000 m^{3} (2.69×10^{9} cu ft)
- Islands: 0

The Wallersee is a lake in the Austrian state of Salzburg northeast of the city of Salzburg in Salzburg-Umgebung District.

Around the lake there is a hiking path of about 20 km (12 mi) length; at its southern part, it converges with the famous Camino de Santiago (Austrian route). There are two campsite resorts. It is allowed to swim and bath.

The northern shore consists of bogland since 1883 and is called Wenger Moor.

== Populated places adjacent to the lake ==
- Henndorf am Wallersee south of the lake
- Köstendorf north
- Neumarkt am Wallersee east
- Seekirchen am Wallersee west
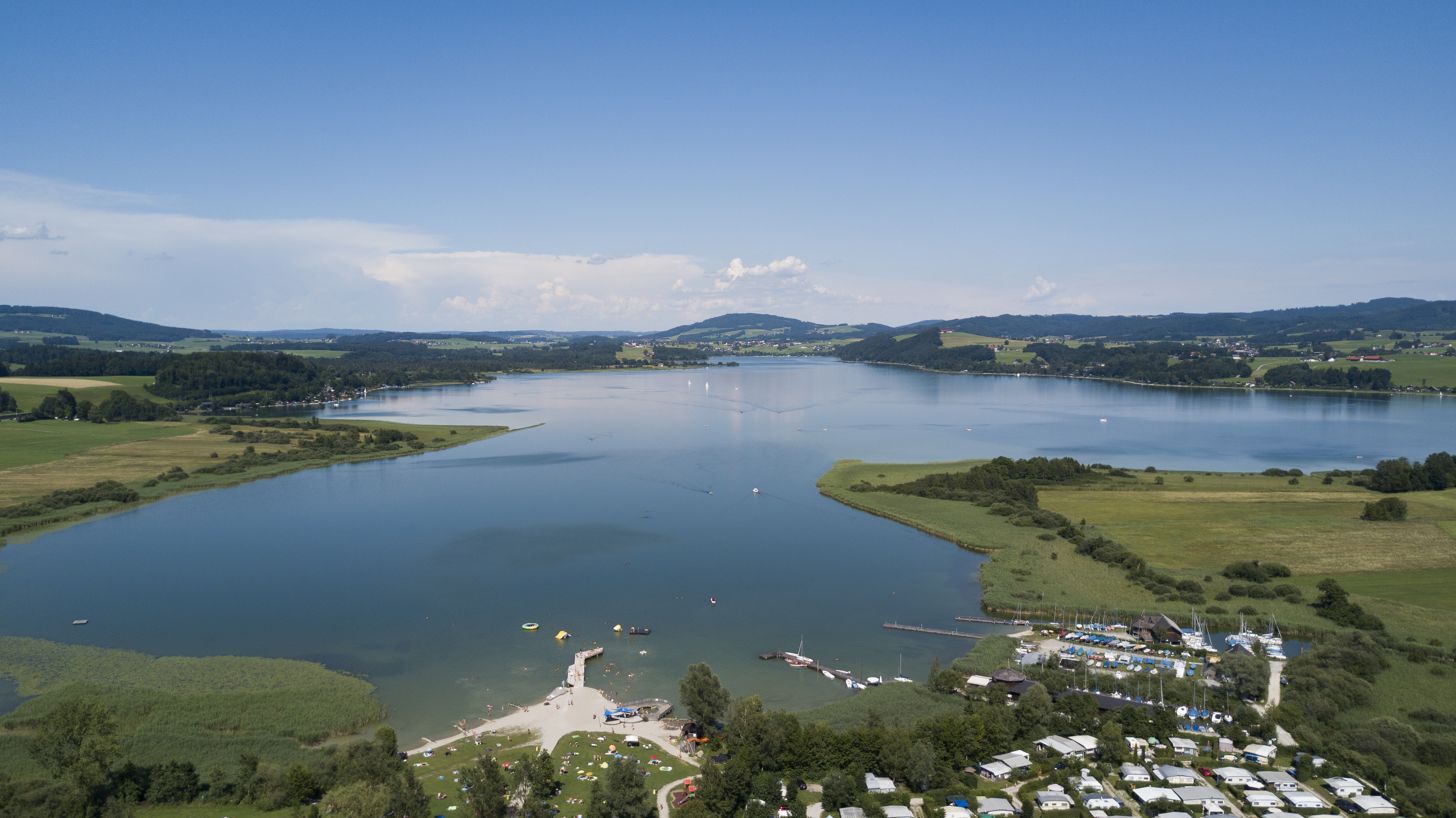
Eastern banks

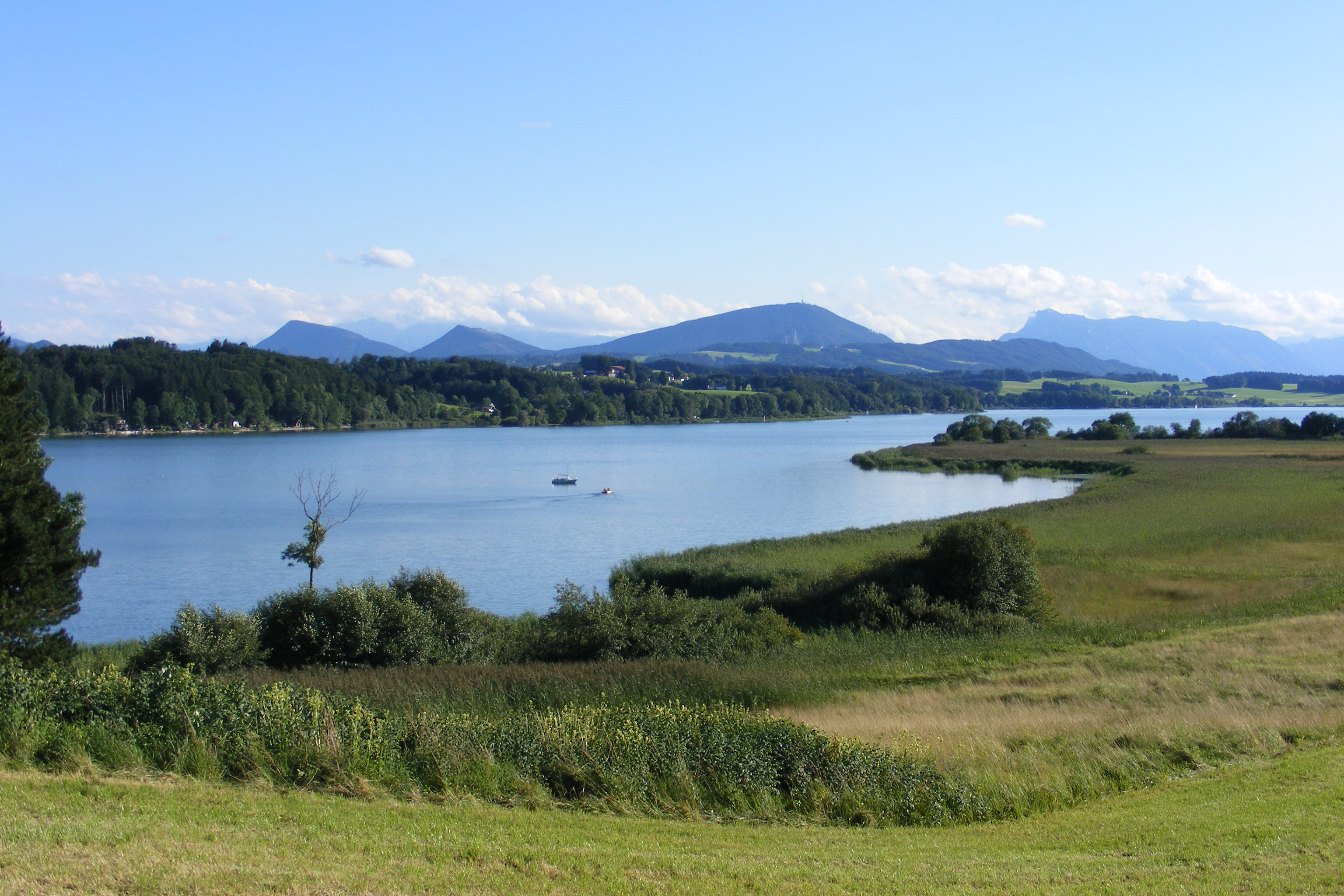
view to southwest

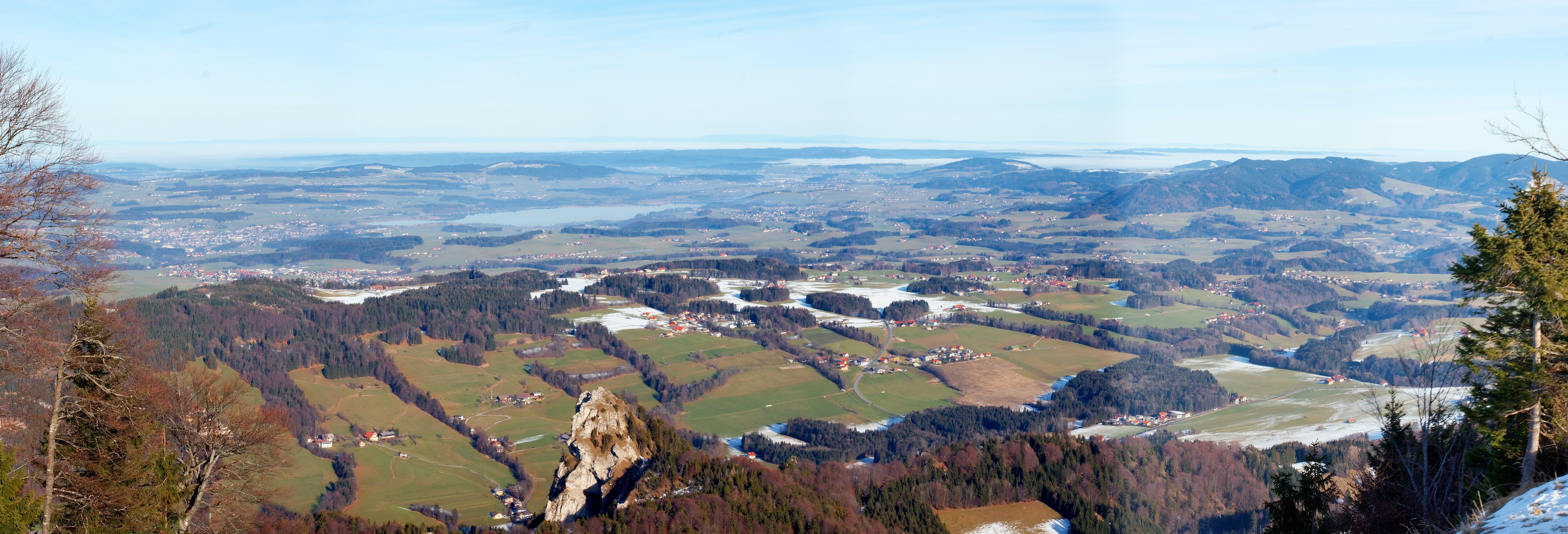
view from Gaisberg

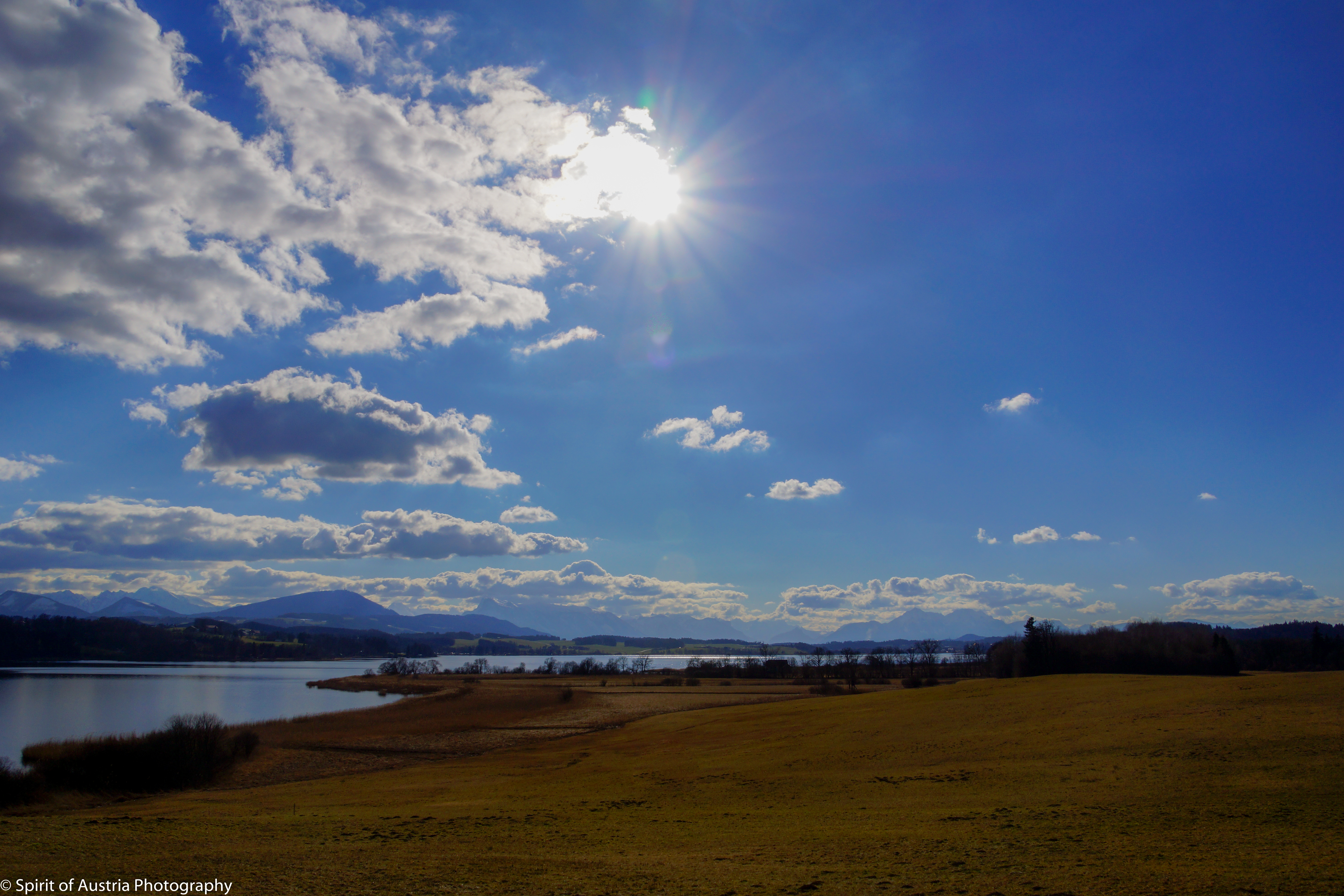
Wenger Moor and Wallersee

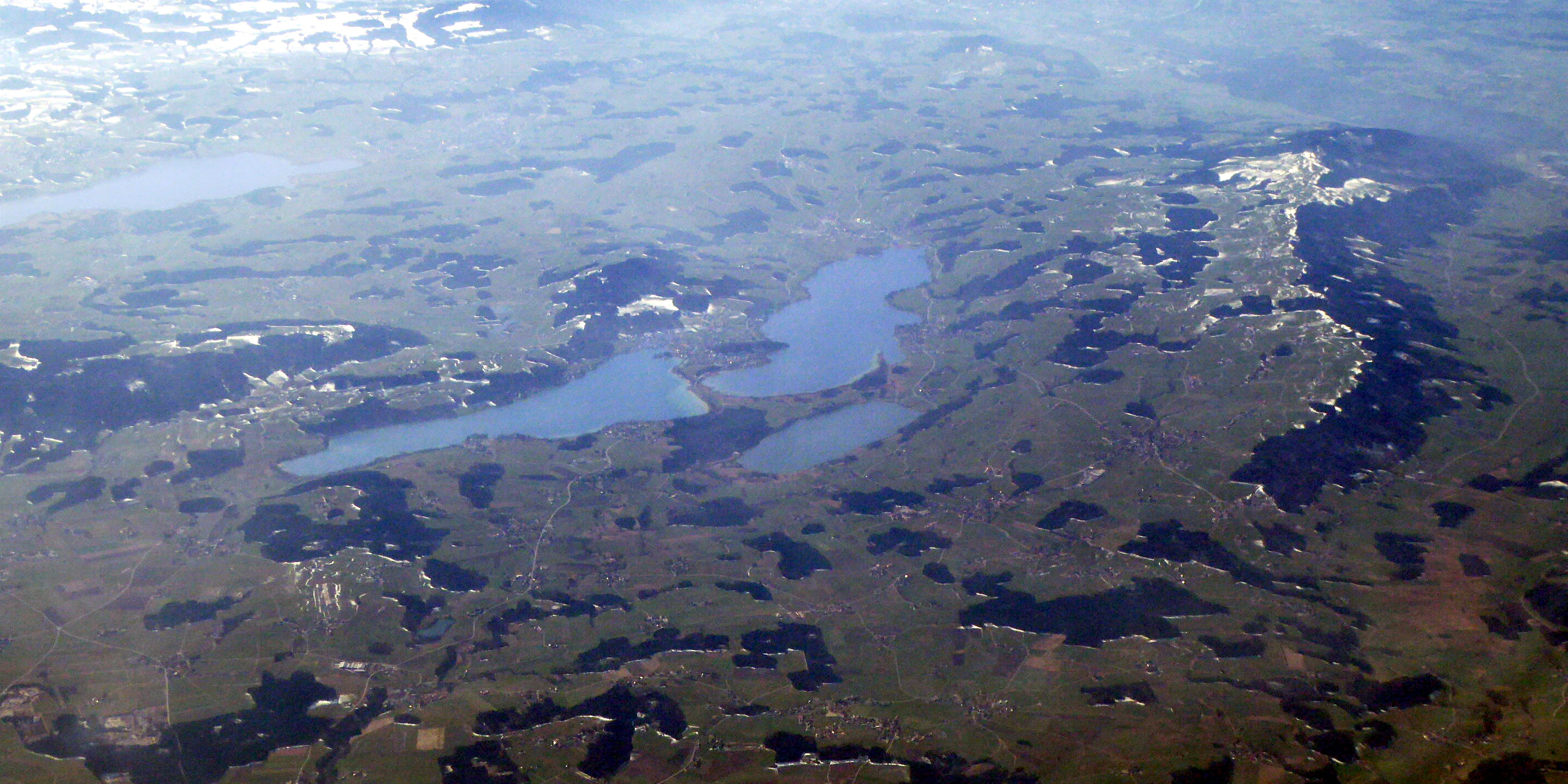
Wallersee pictured far left
