= Albert Brackmann =

German historian (1871–1952)

- Born: 24 June 1871; Hanover, Germany
- Died: 17 March 1952 (aged 80); Berlin-Dahlem
- Occupation: Non-fiction writer

Academic background
- Education: Leipzig University; University of Göttingen; University of Tübingen

Academic work
- Discipline: History
- Institutions: Humboldt University of Berlin; University of Königsberg; University of Marburg

Albert Brackmann (24 June 1871, Hanover – 17 March 1952, Berlin-Dahlem) was a leading nationalist German historian associated with the Ostforschung, a multi-disciplined organisation set up to co-ordinate German propaganda on Eastern Europe. After the Nazis took power, he became one of the chief propagandists in service of the regime. In this position he supported Nazi genocidal policies, ethnic cleansing and anti-semitism.

== Biography ==
At the conclusion of his university education in Tübingen, Leipzig, and Göttingen, Brackmann joined, at the age of twenty-seven, the staff of MGH (Monumenta Germaniae Historica), the leading German source publication for medieval documents. He was appointed professor of history at Königsberg in 1913, Marburg in 1920, and Berlin in 1922. In 1929 he became the director general of the Prussian Privy State Archives, in Berlin-Dahlem. In connection with accepting the position he advocated for the establishment of a special Institute for Archival Sciences and Historical Training (Preußisches Institut für Archivwissenschaft), to provide for the professional training of archivists; the institute, which came under the administration of the state archives, opened in Berlin-Dahlem in May 1930. Brackmann, in his capacity as director general of the archives, simultaneously served as the archival institute's first director, until his retirement in 1936. During his term at the archives he retained an honorary professorship at the University of Berlin.

Originally a specialist in relations between the Holy Roman Empire and the Papacy, he turned towards the history of the Germans in Eastern Europe as a result of his experiences of the First World War. Politically right-wing, he was a member first of the DVP (German People's Party) and then of the DNVP (German National People's Party) during the Weimar Republic, and was joint editor of the prestigious and influential Historische Zeitschrift from 1928 to 1935.

Favoured by leading Nazis, including Adolf Hitler himself, Brackmann steadily turned the Ostforschung away from detached academic work towards projects that fed directly into the wider foreign policy and expansionist aims being pursued by the Nazi government. In September 1939, he congratulated himself on heading a research organisation that had become the central agency "for scholarly advice for the Foreign, Interior and Propaganda ministries, the army high command and a number of SS departments." He was also an author for the Ahnenerbe, a research body set up under the auspices of Heinrich Himmler, publishing a booklet entitled "Crisis and Construction in Eastern Europe" that questioned the historical validity of Poland as a nation by arguing that Mitteleuropa (Central Europe) was the original Lebensraum of the German nation.

After the outbreak of World War II, Brackmann's work also extended to issues of Germanisation, and the removal of "undesired ethnic elements" from German domains. In this particular context he did much to promote the work of Otto Reche, professor of racial studies at the University of Leipzig, and a noted anti-Semite. Responding to Reche's appeal that Germany needed Raum (room), and not "Polish lice in the fur", Brackmann brought his argument for a strict definition of ethnicity to the attention of a number of different ministries. In essence, Reche argued that the Poles should be pushed eastwards further into Ukraine, whose population, in turn, would be pushed even further east.

Defeat in the war produced only a temporary halt in Brackmann's academic work. In 1946 he was actively involved in the reconstruction of Ostforschung, and many of his pupils went on to occupy important academic positions in the German Federal Republic, with anti-communism replacing the former fashion for expansionism. Brackmann died in 1952, but the Zeitschrift für Ostforschung went on, amongst other things, to re-publish some of the work of the notoriously anti-Polish Dr Kurt Lück, who served as an SS-Sonderführer, before he was killed by Soviet partisans in 1942.
