= Arenberg Castle, Salzburg =

Castle on right bank of river Salzach

Coordinates: 47.8°N 13.0583°E

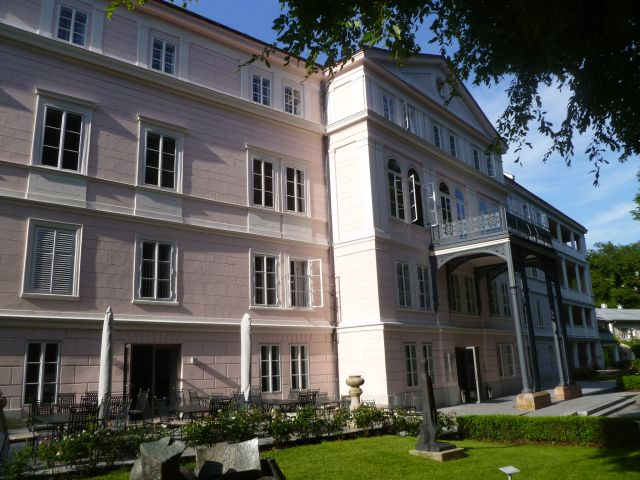
Schloss Arenberg in 2012

The Arenberg Castle (Schloss Arenberg or Schloss Bürglstein) is a castle on the right bank of the river Salzach in Salzburg.

The castle was first documented in the 14th century and belonged to the lords of Keutzl, the lords of Pirglstein and later the lords of Rehling until the 16th century. In the 17th century, the castle was purchased by Archbishop Johann Ernst von Thun, but in 1695 it became a nunnery of the Ursuline Sisters. However, this was short-lived and three years later, the nuns moved to Gstättengasse.

In 1791, gardener Sebastian Rosenegger bought the property and encouraged the building of a new park in the castle grounds. He passed it to his son, the businessman and amateur archaeologist Josef Rosenegger. In 1792, Rosenegger discovered, during excavations for the new park, a large Roman cemetery and treasures. The park soon became a popular destination from miles around Salzburg, and it was visited by several state leaders.

After a fire in 1814, the castle was rebuilt. On 3 January 1842, Eberhard Fugger, a renowned geologist and director of the Salzburg Museum, bought the castle. In 1861, Princess Sophie of Arenberg purchased the castle and expanded it further by linking the two three-story buildings with a central tower.

From 1912 to 1922, the building served as the home of the writer and philosopher Hermann Bahr and his wife, Anna Bahr-Mildenburg, an opera singer and co-founder of the Salzburg Festival. In 1931, the castle became owned by the government of Salzburg.

In January 2001, the Salzburg Stiftung of the American Austrian Foundation purchased the castle from the regional government of Salzburg. In 2005, after a total renovation, the castle opened as a conference center.

On 20 April 2009, the castle was destroyed by a fire caused by welders on the roof. It has been completely rebuilt and resumed operations in April 2010.
