= Kreuzbergmaut Hydroelectric Power Station =

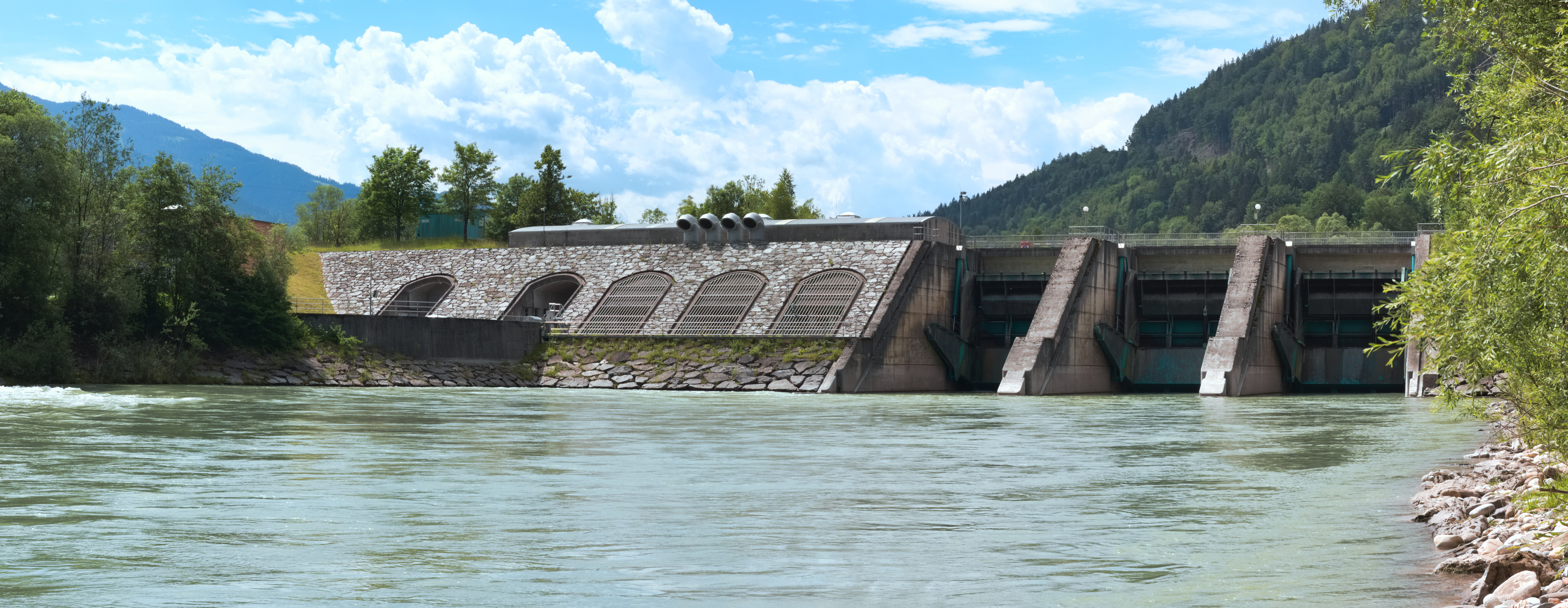

- Location within Austria
- Official name: Kraftwerk Kreuzbergmaut
- Location: Pfarrwerfen, Salzburg, Austria
- Coordinates: 47.441296°N 13.210459°E
- Purpose: Power
- Status: Operational
- Construction began: 1993; 33 years ago
- Opening date: 1995; 31 years ago
- Owners: Verbund, Salzburg AG
- Operator: Salzburg AG

Dam and spillways
- Type of dam: Concrete gravity dam
- Impounds: Salzach
- Spillway type: Over the dam

Reservoir
- Normal elevation: 537 m

Power Station
- Commission date: 1995
- Hydraulic head: 10.87 m
- Turbines: Kaplan-type 2 × 9.975 MW
- Installed capacity: 17.7 MW
- Annual generation: 80 GWh

Kreuzbergmaut Hydroelectric Power Station (German: Kraftwerk Kreuzbergmaut) is a run-of-the-river hydroelectric power station on the Salzach. It is located in Pfarrwerfen municipality, state of Salzburg, Austria.

Construction of the power station began in 1993. It was operational in 1995. Kreuzbergmaut is owned by Verbund and Salzburg AG. The operator is Salzburg AG.

== Dam ==
Kreuzbergmaut dam consists of a weir (length 36 m) with 3 sluice gates on the left side and a machine hall on the right side.

== Reservoir ==
The dam creates a small reservoir with a length of 2.7 km. The normal reservoir level is 537 m a.s.l.

== Power station ==
The power station contains 2 Kaplan turbine-generators with 9.975 MW each. The total nameplate capacity is 17.7 MW. Its average annual generation is 80 GWh. The turbines were provided by NOELL and the generators by ABB.

The maximum hydraulic head is 10.87 m. The maximum flow per turbine is 97 m³/s.

== Gallery ==
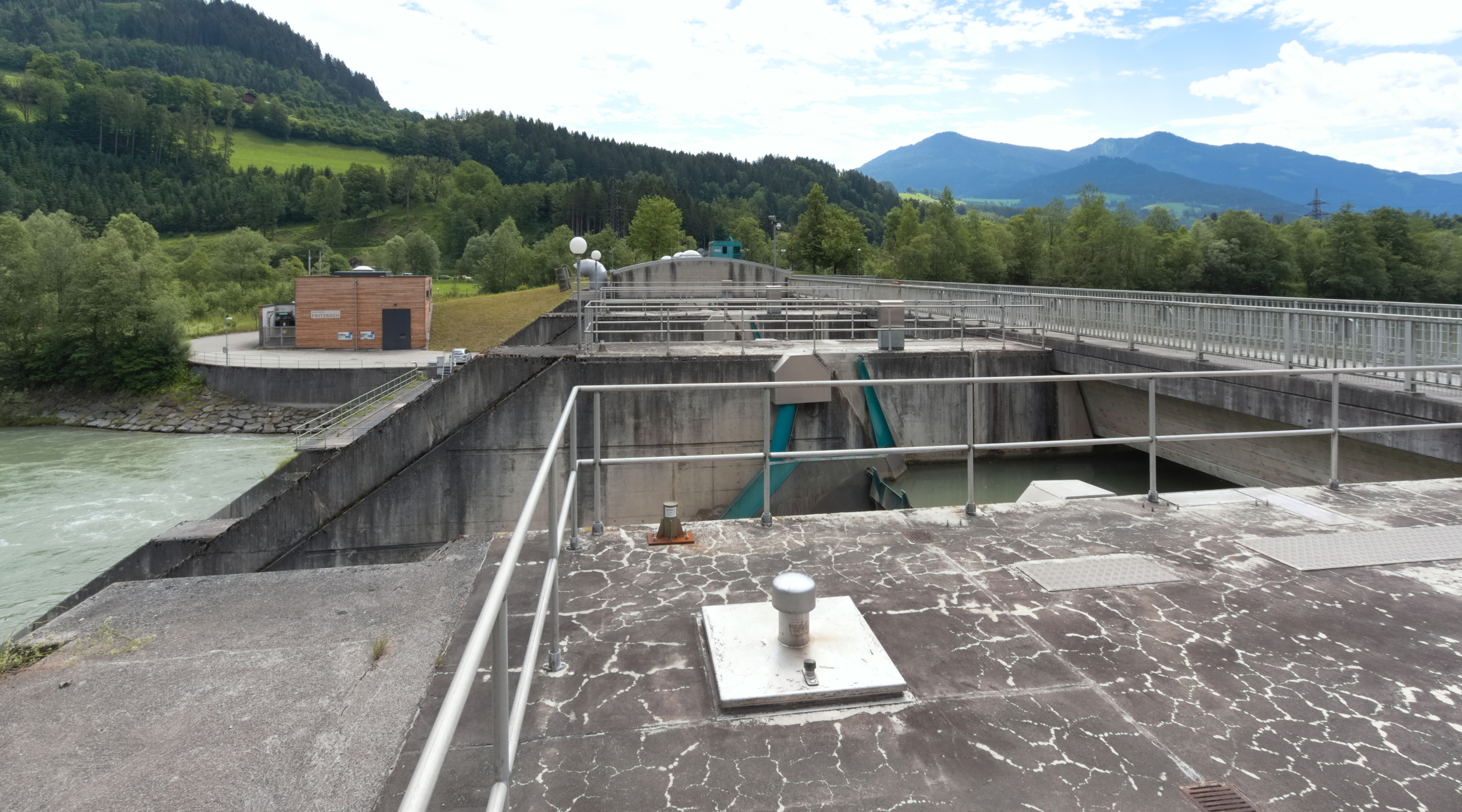
The power station weir

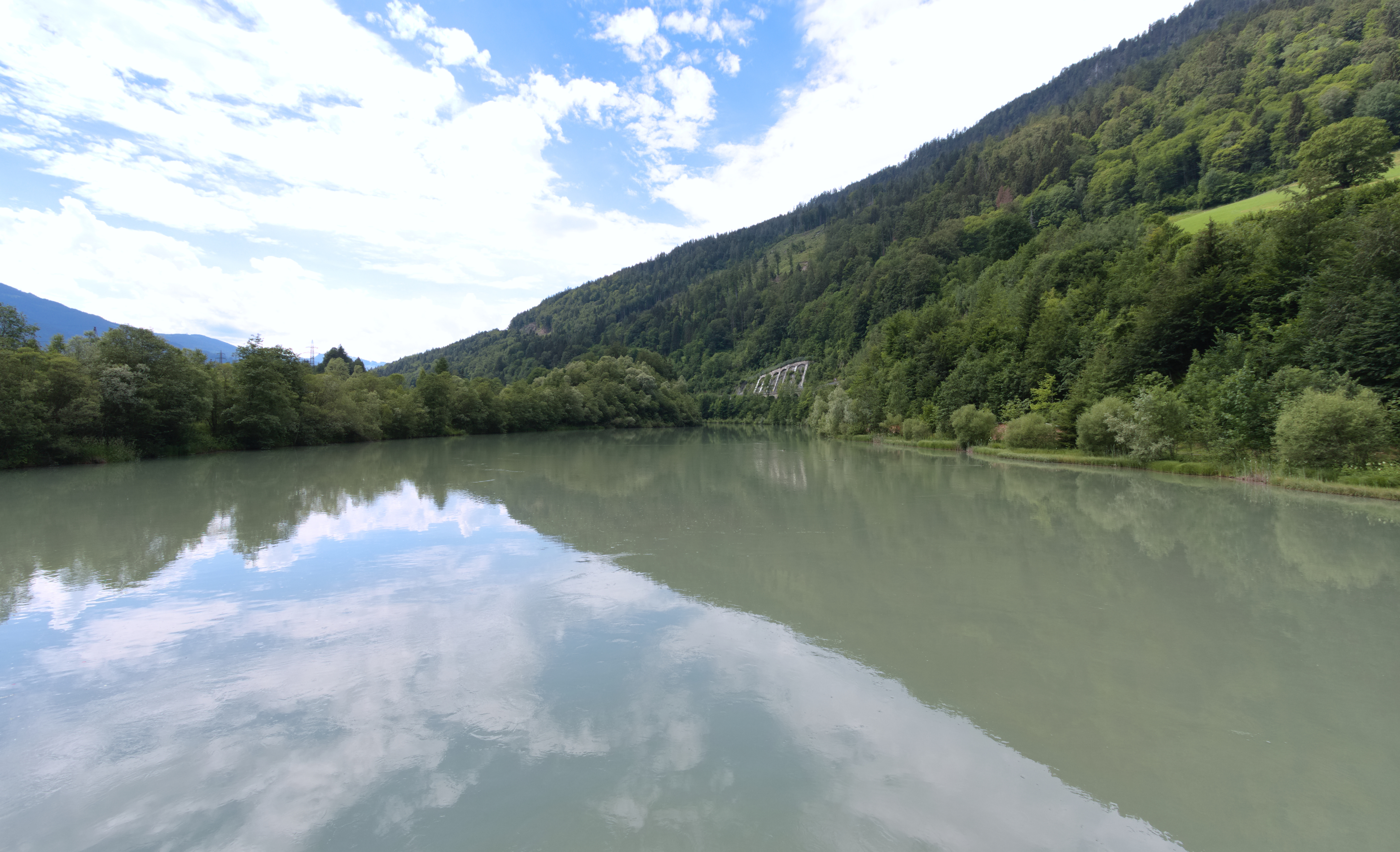
View from the weir to the headwater

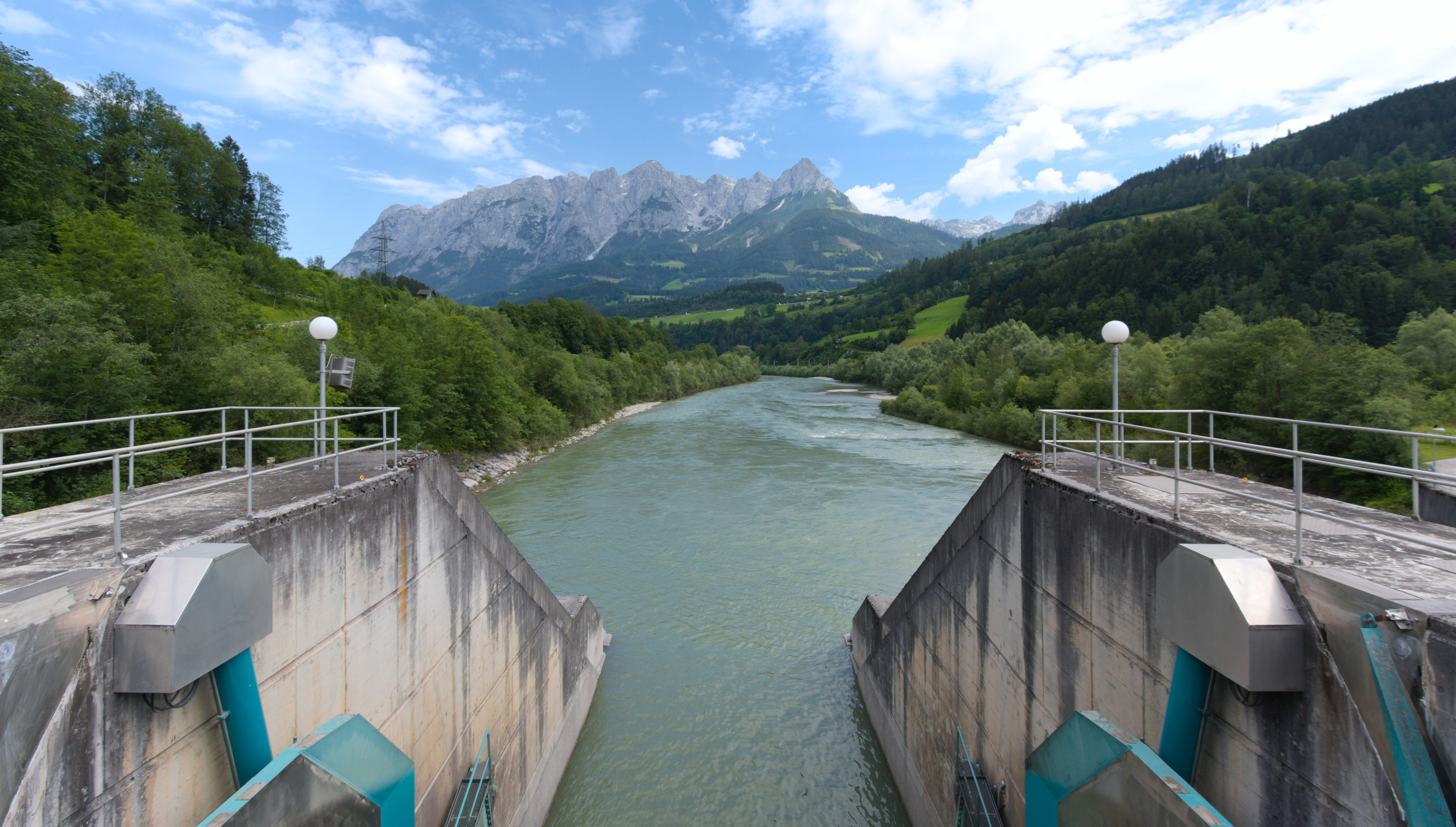
View from the weir to the tailwater
