= Luckes =

Luckes is a surname. It may be a variant of Lucas or Lucks.

Luckes as a surname may refer to:

- David Luckes (born 1968), a former field hockey goalkeeper from England
- Eva Luckes (1854–1919), Matron of the London Hospital
- Wally Luckes (1901–1982), English cricketer

== See also ==
- Lucas (surname)
- Lucks (disambiguation)
