= Luck (surname) =

Luck is a surname. For the people with the German family name spelled Lück, see Lück.

- Luck (Kent cricketer), 18th-century English professional cricketer
- Andrew Luck (born 1989), American football quarterback
- Aubrey Luck (1900–1999), Australian politician
- Babar Luck (born 1970), English musician
- Charles Luck (1886–1981), British gymnast
- Edward Luck (1948–2021), American U.N. adviser
- Ethan Luck (born 1978), American musician
- Frank Luck (born 1967), German bi-athlete
- Gary E. Luck (born 1937), American Army general
- Isaac Luck (1817–1881), New Zealand architect
- J. Murray Luck (1899-1993), Canadian biochemist
- Jordan Luck (born 1961), New Zealand musician
- Karin Luck (rower), German rower
- Karin Luck (Chilean politician)
- Karl-Heinz Luck (born 1945), German Nordic combined skier
- Michael Luck, British computer scientist
- Micheal Luck (born 1982), Australian rugby league player
- Oliver Luck (born 1960), American professional football player and sports executive; father of Andrew Luck
- Peter Luck (1944-2017), Australian author, TV journalist, producer and presenter
- Sophie Luck (born 1989), Australian actress
- Stephanie Luck, American politician
- Tony Luck, Canadian politician
- Hans von Luck (1911–1997), German World War II officer
