= Otto Reche =

German anthropologist (1879–1966)

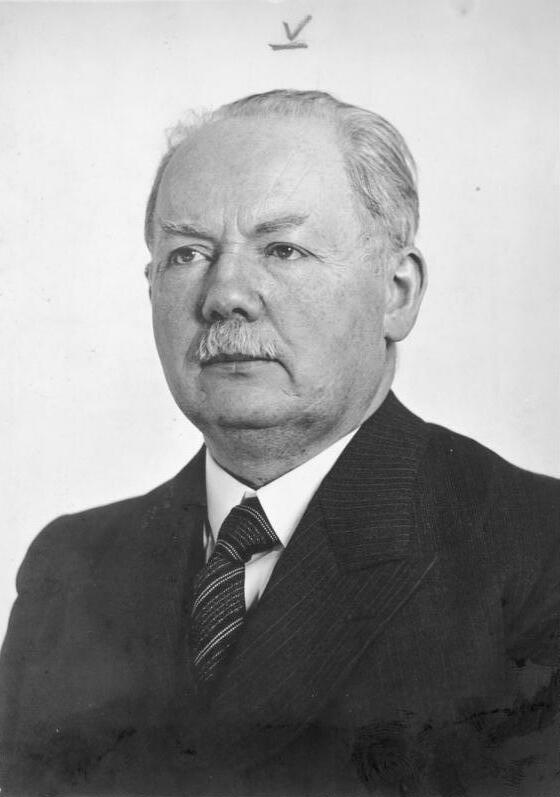
Otto Reche

Otto Carl Reche (24 May 1879 – 23 March 1966) was a German anthropologist and professor from Glatz (Kłodzko), Prussian Silesia. He was active in researching whether there was a correlation between blood types and race. During the Second World War he openly advocated the genocide of ethnic Poles. Once a member of the Nazi Party, he remained active in anthropological issues following the downfall of Nazi Germany.

== Education and career ==
Reche was educated at the University of Breslau (now the University of Wrocław), the University of Jena and the University of Berlin.

In his career, Reche served as the director of the Departments of Anthropology at the University of Vienna and then the University of Leipzig, and also taught at the University of Hamburg. Among the organizations he was involved in were the Nazi Party and the German Society for Blood Group Research (which he founded along with Paul Steffan). In 1928, Reche and Steffan founded Zeitschrift für Rassenphysiologie, a magazine on the subject.

== Blood type research and conclusions ==
Reche's work with blood types, involving studies in northwestern Germany, was an attempt to prove a correlation between which blood type a person had and whether they were of German ancestry. He claimed that the three blood types, A, B, and O, were each originally attached to European, Asian, and Native American races, but that interracial marriage had diluted this over the centuries.

== Support for the genocide of Poles ==
Reche justified the invasion of Poland in 1939 in a letter to Albert Brackmann arguing:

we need Raum but no Polish lice on our fur. I am absolutely of the opinion that the racial-scientific side is determinative in the solution of all these questions since we do not want to build a German people in the East in the future that would only be a linguistically germanised, racial mish-mash, with strong asiatic elements, and Polish in character. That would be no German Volk, nor a cornerstone for a German future!...Since I also know the anthropological conditions in Poland and know what is racially and hereditarily useful in this people and what at all events is to be driven out of the German settlement area, I believe I have gathered together in the course of many years several ideas which should now be used for the general good and for our future.

During the Second World War Reche became director of Institute for Racial and Ethnic Sciences in Lipsk. In this position he wrote about ethnic Poles, claiming that they are an "unfortunate mixture" consisting among others of Slavs, Balts and Mongolians and that they should be eliminated to avoid possible mixing with the German race.

== Life after the war ==
On April 16, 1945, Reche was arrested by American forces for membership in the Nazi Party, but released after sixteen months of detainment.

In 1959, Reche was chosen by a German court investigating the claims of Anna Anderson that she was Anastasia Nikolaevna, a Russian Grand Duchess thought to have been murdered along with the rest of the royal family. He concluded that Anna Anderson was either the Grand Duchess herself or an identical twin. After Anderson's death, however, it was concluded based on DNA evidence that she was not Anastasia.

Reche died near Hamburg in 1966.
