= Norbert Neuser =

German politician

Norbert Neuser MEP
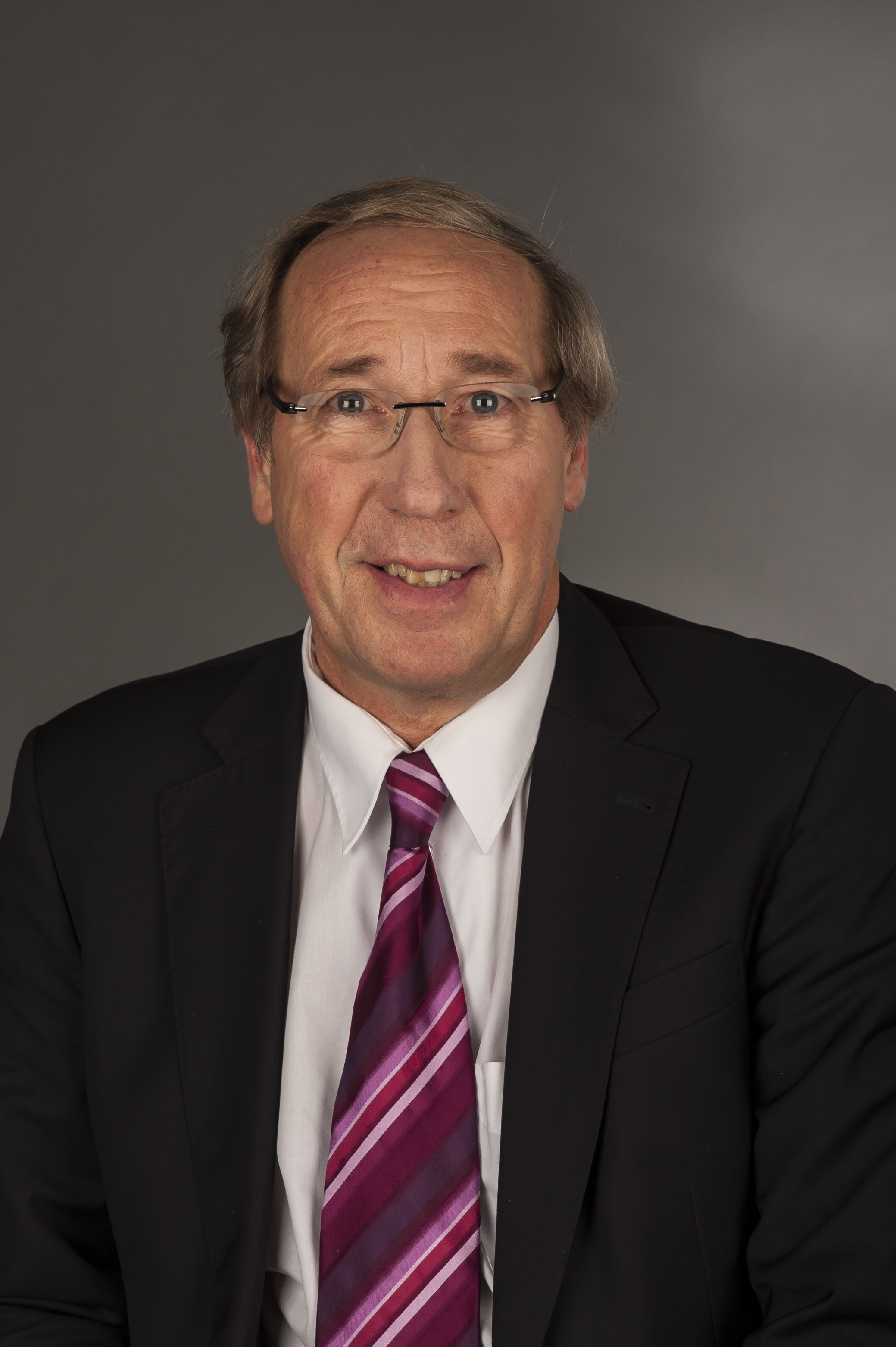

Member of the European Parliament for Germany
- In office 2009–2022
- Succeeded by: Karsten Lucke

Personal details
- Party: Social Democratic Party of Germany

Norbert Hans Neuser is a German teacher and politician of the Social Democratic Party (SPD) who served as a Member of the European Parliament from 2009 to 2022. In late 2021, he announced his decision to resign from parliament by January 2022.
