= Sur (river) =

River in Germany

- The Sur at Weildorf, Teisendorf

Location
- Country: Germany
- State: Bavaria

Physical characteristics
- Mouth
  - location: Salzach
  - coordinates: 47.9089°N 12.9582°E
- Length: 43.7 km (27.2 mi)
- Basin size: 150 km^{2} (58 sq mi)

Basin features
- Progression: Salzach→ Inn→ Danube→ Black Sea

The Sur is a river of Bavaria, Germany. It flows into the Salzach south of Laufen.

== See also ==
- List of rivers of Bavaria
