= Luckin (surname) =

Luckin is an English surname. Notable people with the surname include:

- Roger Luckin (1939–2025), English cricketer
- Verner Luckin (1892–1931), English cricketer

== See also ==
- Luckin Coffee
- Lucking
