= Lucks =

Lucks may refer to:

- Heiko Lucks, Namibian politician
- Max Lucks (born 1997), German politician
- Stefan Lucks, a researcher in the fields of communications security and cryptography
- Lucks, Virginia, community in the U.S state of Virginia
- Derek Lucks, the main antagonist of Meta Runner

== See also ==
- Luck's Incorporated, a food production company based in North Carolina, now an Arizona Canning Company brand
- Luck (disambiguation)
- Luckes, a surname
