= Lück =

Lück or Lueck is a German surname that may refer to:

- Bill Lueck (born 1946), American football player
- Dale Lueck (born 1949), American politician
- Daniel Lück (born 1991), German footballer
- Hans-Joachim Lück (born 1953), German rower
- Heidi Lück (born 1943), German politician
- Ingolf Lück (born 1958), German actor and comedian
- Kurt Lück (1900–1942), German historian and SS Obersturmbannführer
- Mackenzie Lueck (c. 1996–2019), American murder victim
- Martin C. Lueck (1888–1986), American farmer and politician
- Martin L. Lueck (1872–1926), American politician and judge
- Petra Kusch-Lück (born 1948), German host, entertainer, dancer, and singer
- Siegfried Lück, retired East German slalom canoeist competing from the late 1950s to the late 1960s
- Thomas Lück (born 1981), German sprint canoer
- Wolfgang Lück (born 1957), German mathematician

== See also ==
- Luck (disambiguation)
- Lücke
