= Anna von Mildenburg =

Austrian opera singer (1872–1947)

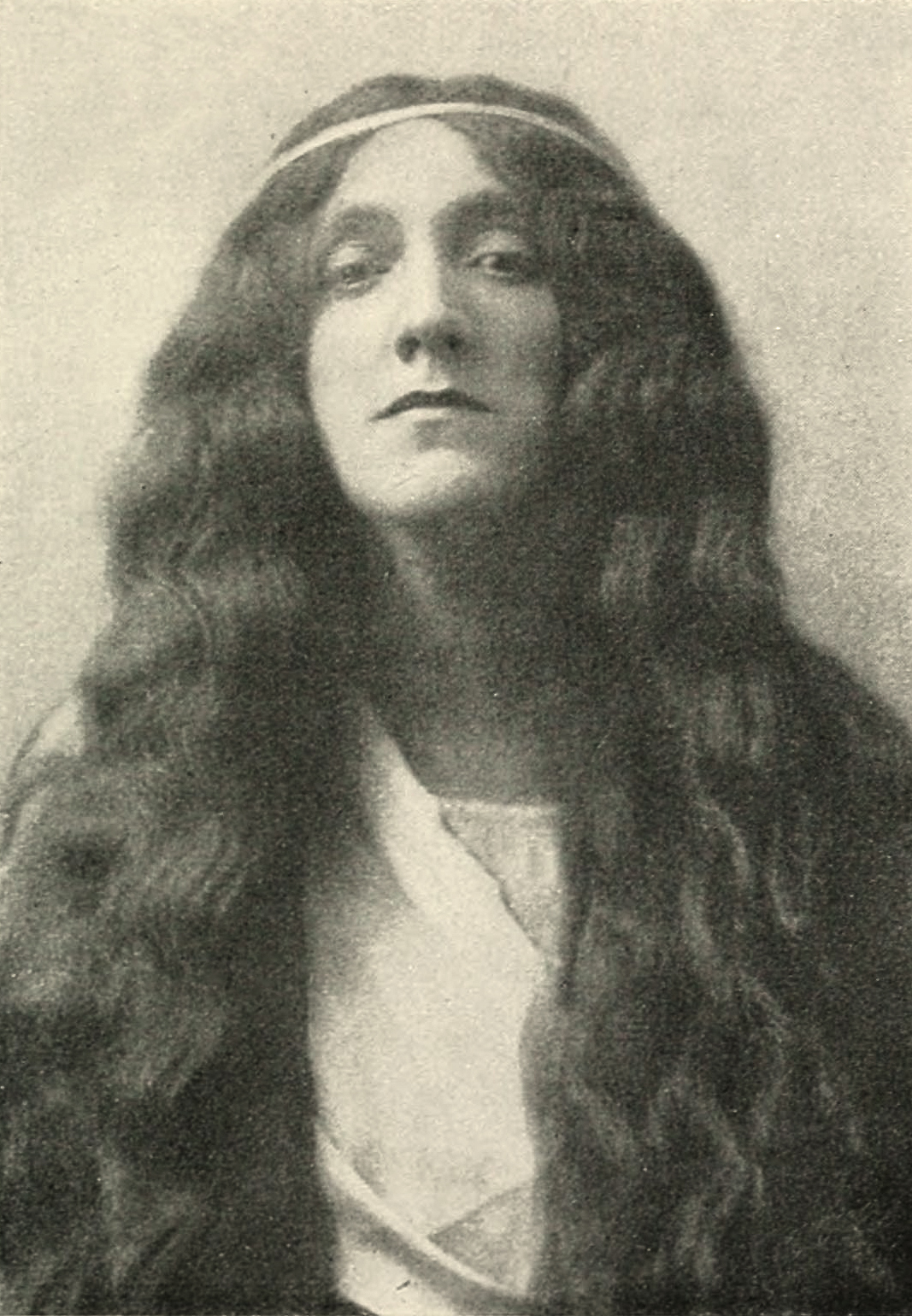
Anna von Mildenburg

Anna Bellschan von Mildenburg (29 November 1872 – 27 January 1947) was an eminent Wagnerian dramatic soprano of Austrian nationality. Known as Anna Bahr-Mildenburg after her 1909 marriage, she had been a protégé of the composer/conductor Gustav Mahler during his musical directorship at the Hamburg State Opera. In 1898, Mahler took her to the Vienna State Opera, where she established herself as one of the great stars during his celebrated tenure there as music director.

== Biography ==
Anna Bellschan von Mildenburg, to give her full maiden name, was born in Vienna, the Austrian capital. She studied voice with Rosa Papier and Johannes Ress at the Conservatory of Gesellschaft der Musikfreunde in Vienna (now the University of Music and Performing Arts Vienna), and then privately with Cosima Wagner and Mahler. She had an affair with the latter which lasted until 1897.

Von Mildenburg made her operatic debut in 1895 at Hamburg, singing the role of Brünnhilde in The Ring Cycle under Mahler's baton. Then, in 1897, she performed the role of Kundry in Parsifal at the Bayreuth Festival, and also took on the mezzo-soprano part of Ortrud in Lohengrin. Cosima Wagner, the composer's widow, became her mentor at Bayreuth, and she proceeded to perform all the main Wagnerian soprano parts at the festival prior to the outbreak of World War I in 1914.

She first sang at the Vienna Hofoper on 8 December 1897, when she took the role of Brünnhilde in Die Walküre under Hans Richter. Mahler put her on a contract and she soon experienced enormous success. In her first season alone she earned 14,000 florins (about €112,000 in 2008). Her stature at the opera house equaled that of Mahler, who was then the establishment's director of music. She would perform at the Vienna State Opera until 1917, and then again in 1919-1920. Among her most celebrated performances during this period was an assumption of Isolde's role in a famous production of Tristan und Isolde mounted under Mahler's leadership.

Away from Vienna, von Mildenburg sang to acclaim in London at the Royal Opera House, Covent Garden, performing Isolde and Elizabeth in Tannhäuser there in 1906, as well as Klytemnestra in the first London production of Richard Strauss' Elektra. Her repertoire was not confined, however, to works by Strauss and Wagner. She also appeared in Beethoven's Fidelio, Bellini's Norma, Mozart's Don Giovanni and Weber's Oberon during the course of her career.

From 1922 to 1927, von Mildenburg was a guest artist at the Salzburg Festival, appearing in Hugo von Hofmannsthal's stage work Das Salzburger große Welttheater, among other productions. After retiring from opera, she gave singing lessons in Munich. Among those she instructed in Munich were Lilian Benningsen, Fritz Schaetzler, and the renowned Wagnerian tenor, Lauritz Melchior, who consulted her in 1922. After 1929, she taught voice at the International Mozarteum Summer Academy in Salzburg, but she returned briefly to the stage in 1930 to sing one last Klytemnestra at Augsburg.

She eventually retired from teaching because of the exigencies of the Second World War and died in 1947. Together with her husband, the Austrian author, playwright and critic Hermann Bahr, she is buried in a place of honor in the Salzburg Community Cemetery. Between 1912 and 1922 they lived together in Salzburg at Arenberg Castle, where one of the Frauenspuren memorial plaques commemorates the singer.

== Her sole recording & histrionic style ==
Only one rare recording by von Mildenburg is known to have survived. It consists of part of the aria "Ocean! thou mighty monster", sung in German, from Oberon by Carl Maria von Weber. Made in 1904, the recording has been re-issued on CD on the Marston and Symposium labels. It substantiates her reputation as a first-class singer of impressive power and authority, possessing strong high notes and producing a steady emission of rounded tone during the years of her prime.

Apparently, she was also a memorable if stylised actress with a strong stage presence. She even published a singers' guide in 1936 on how to act and gesture in Wagner in accordance with what she called the "authentic" Bayreuth method.

== Published works ==
- Befreiung, 1925.
- Mein Hundeleben. Für Hundenarren erzählt., 1926.
- Die „Einser“. Aus meinen Erinnerungen., 1926.
