= Karsten Lucke =

German politician

Karsten Lucke MEP
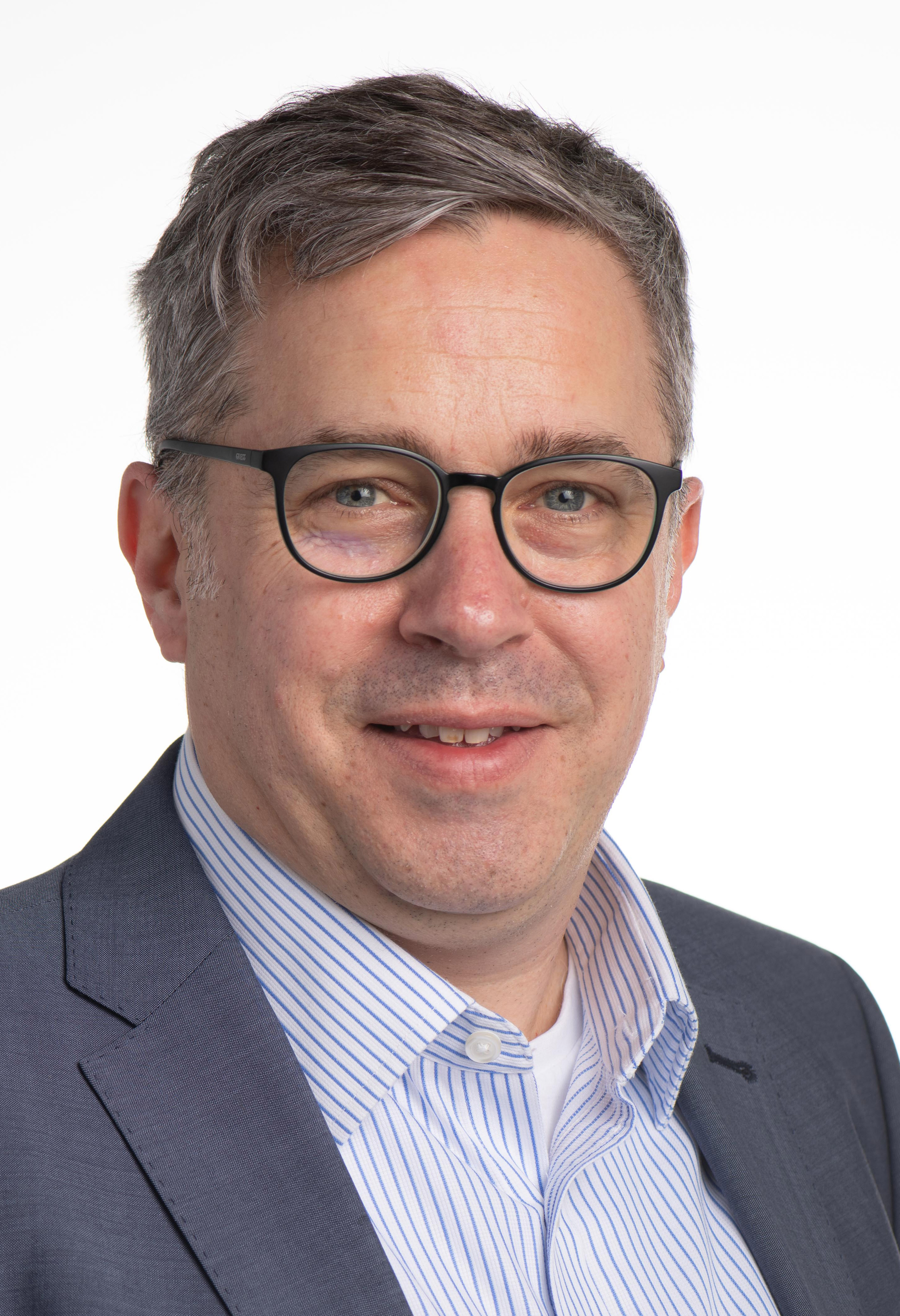

Member of the European Parliament
- Incumbent
- Assumed office 11 January 2022
- Preceded by: Norbert Neuser
- Constituency: Germany

Personal details
- Born: 29 December 1974 (age 51) Kiel, Schleswig-Holstein, Germany
- Party: German: Social Democratic Party; EU: Party of European Socialists
- Education: Kiel University

Karsten Lucke (born 29 December 1974) is a German politician of the Social Democratic Party (SPD) who has been a Member of the European Parliament since 2022.

== Political career ==
Lucke has been mayor of Lautzenbrücken since 2014.

In parliament, Lucke has been serving on the Committee on Development. In addition to his committee assignments, he is part of the parliament's delegations for relations with the countries of South Asia, to the OACPS-EU Joint Parliamentary Assembly and to the Pacific-EU Parliamentary Assembly.

== See also ==
- List of members of the European Parliament for Germany, 2019–2024
