= Salzach =

River in Austria and Germany

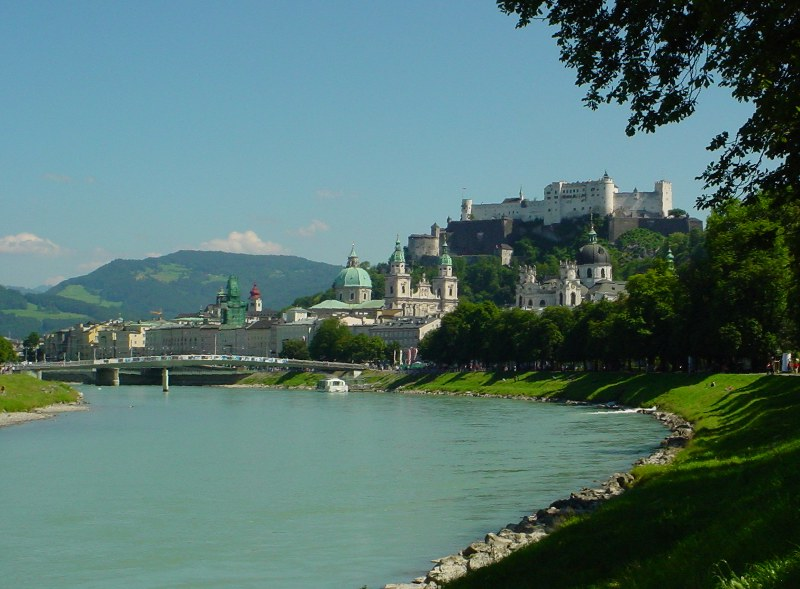
- Salzach in Salzburg, Austria

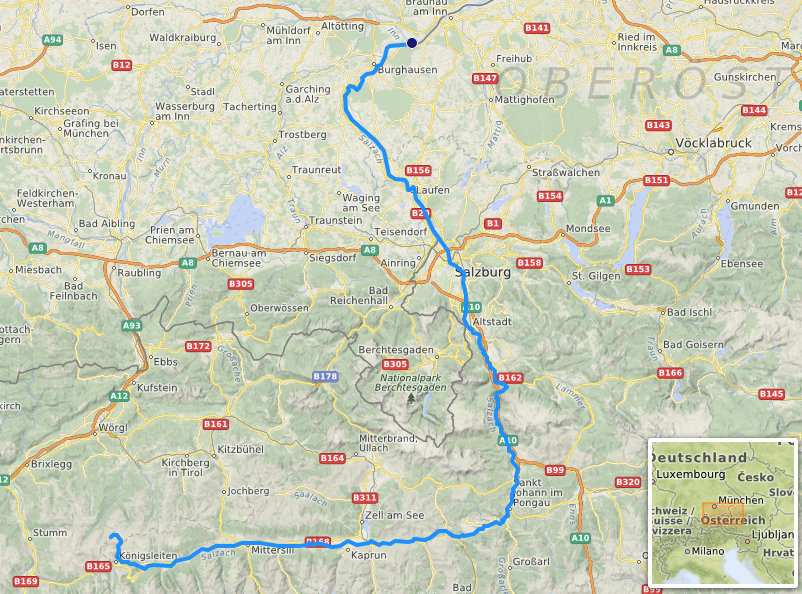
- Salzach location

Location
- Countries: Austria and Germany

Physical characteristics
- Source
  - location: Kitzbühel Alps
- Mouth
  - location: Inn
  - coordinates: 48°12′24″N 12°55′46″E
- Length: 227.3 km (141.2 mi)
- Basin size: 6,829 km^{2} (2,637 sq mi)
- Discharge
  - average: 251 m^{3}/s (8,900 cu ft/s)

Basin features
- Progression: Inn→ Danube→ Black Sea

The Salzach (German: [ˈzaltsax], Austrian German: [ˈsaltsax]) is a river in Austria and Germany. It is 227 kilometres (141 mi) in length and is a right tributary of the Inn, which eventually joins the Danube. Its drainage basin of 6,829 km^{2} (2,637 sq mi) comprises large parts of the Northern Limestone and Central Eastern Alps. 83% of its drainage basin (5,643 km^{2} (2,179 sq mi)) lies in Austria, the remainder in Germany (Bavaria). Its largest tributaries are Lammer, Berchtesgadener Ache, Saalach, Sur and Götzinger Achen.

== Etymology ==
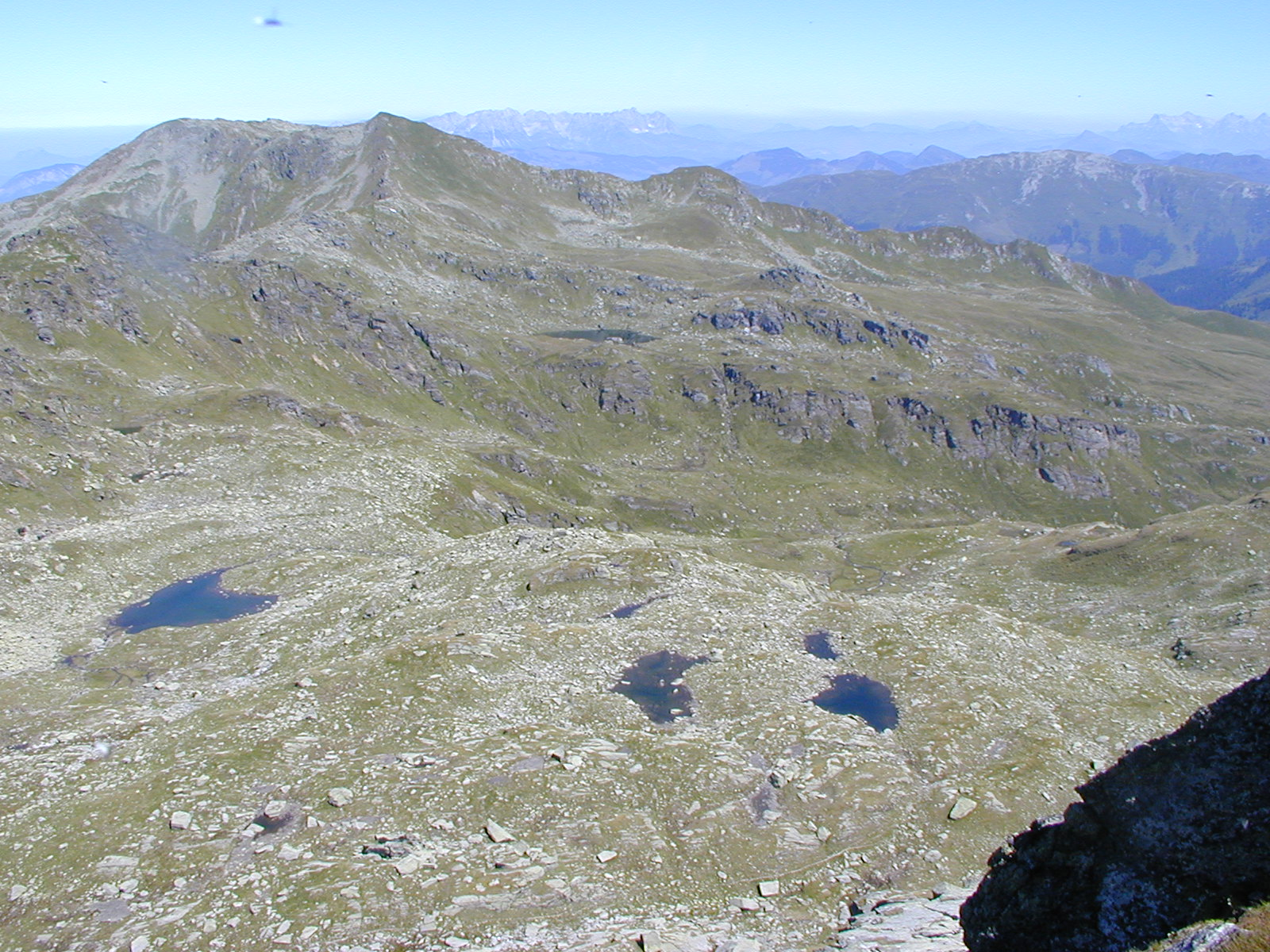
Salzach sources between Mt. Salzachgeier and Schwebenkopf

The river's name is derived from the German word Salz "salt" and Aach. Until the 19th century, shipping of salt down the Salzach was an important part of the local economy. The shipping ended when the parallel Salzburg-Tyrol Railway line replaced the old transport system.

== Course ==
The Salzach is the main river in the Austrian state of Salzburg. The source is located on the edge of the Kitzbühel Alps near Krimml in the western Pinzgau region. Its headstreams drain several alpine pastures at around 2,300 metres (7,500 ft) (metres above the Adriatic), between Krimml and the Tyrolean state border, 3–5 kilometres (2–3 mi) north of the Gerlos Pass on the slopes of the Salzachgeier (2,466 m (8,091 ft)) and the nearby Schwebenkopf peak 2,354 m (7,723 ft)).

From here, it runs eastwards through a large valley via Bruck south of Lake Zell to Schwarzach im Pongau. It then turns northwards and passes Sankt Johann im Pongau. North of here, the Salzach forms the narrow Salzachöfen Gorge between the Berchtesgaden Alps and the Tennen Mountains and before flowing to Hallein and the city of Salzburg.

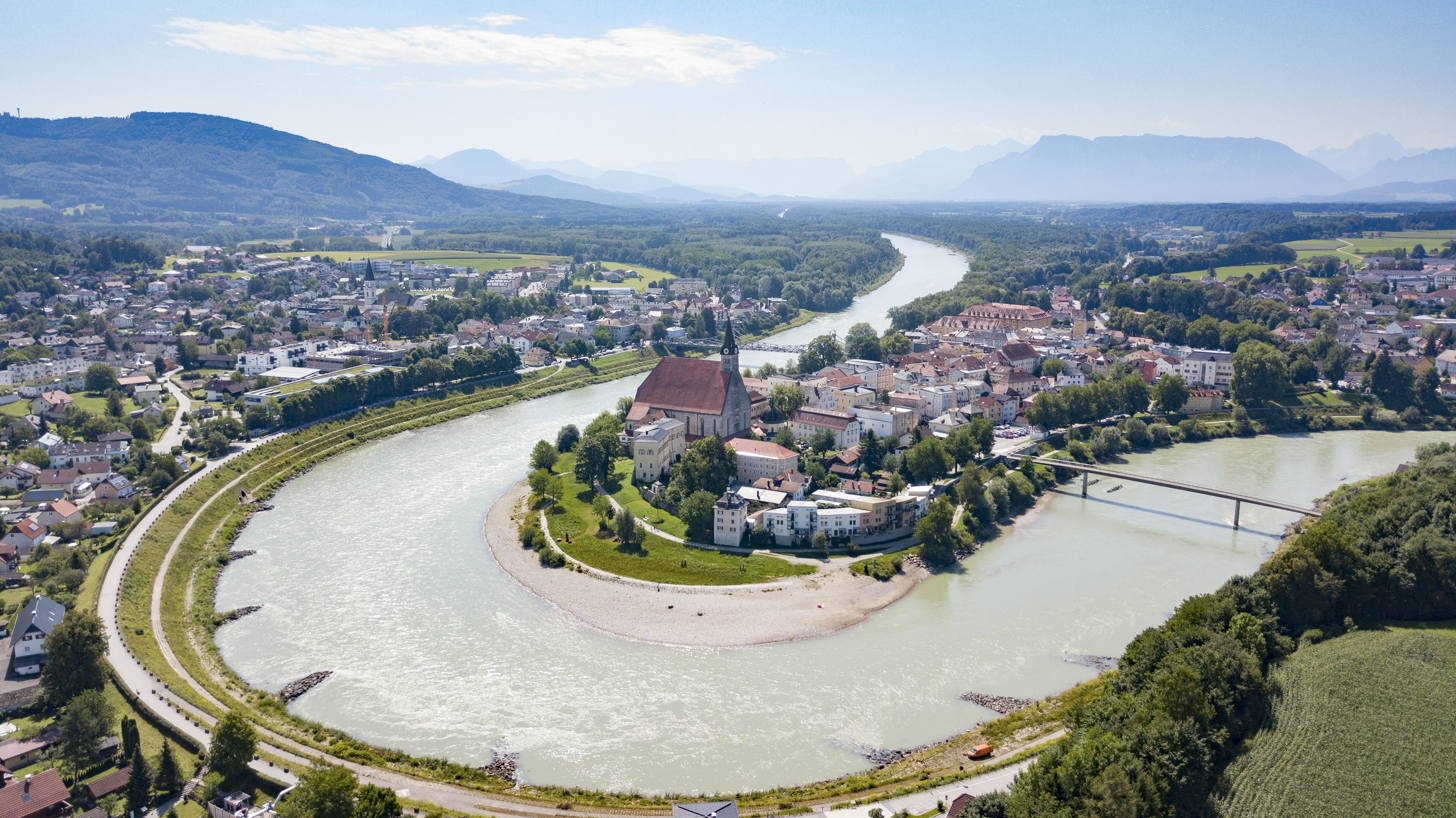
Lower Salzach between Laufen and Oberndorf

From the junction with its Saalach tributary in the northern Salzburg basin, the Salzach forms the border between Bavaria, Germany and the Austrian states of Salzburg and Upper Austria for almost 70 kilometres (43 mi). Cities on the banks in this lower section include Laufen and its sister town Oberndorf bei Salzburg, Tittmoning, and Burghausen. All these towns have border crossings.

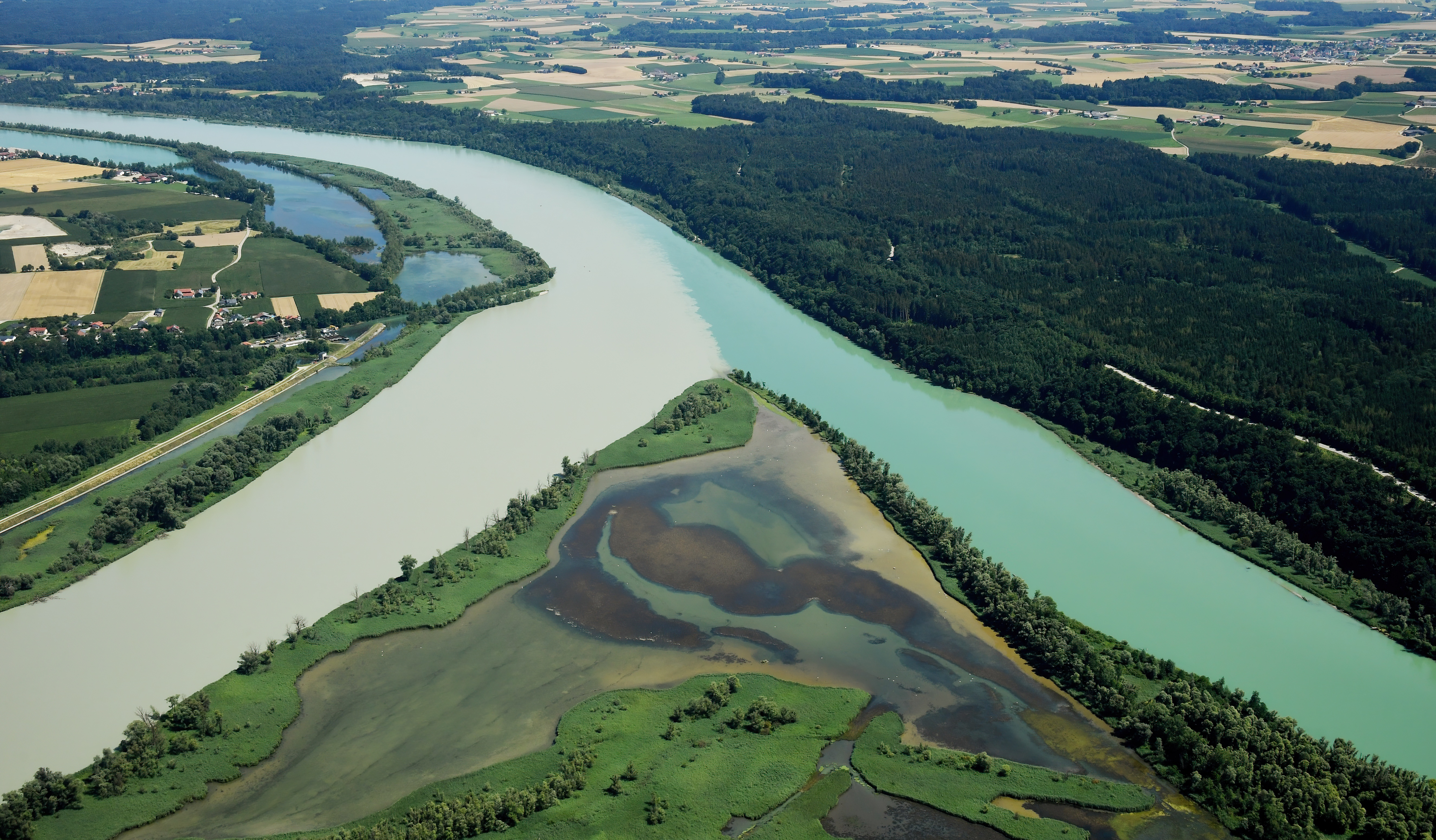
Confluence of the Salzach (right) and the Inn (left)

The river finally empties into the Inn in Haiming between Burghausen and Braunau.

== Tributaries ==
Upper and lower reaches: Putzengraben, Trattenbach and Dürnbach from the Kitzbühel Alps, Krimmler Ache, Obersulzbach, Untersulzbach, Habach, Hollersbach, Felberbach, Stubache, Kapruner Ache from the High Tauern, Pinzga from Lake Zell, Fuscher Ache, Rauriser Ache from the High Tauern, Dientener Bach from the Salzburg Slate Alps, Gasteiner Ache, Großarlbach, Kleinarlbach from the High Tauern, Fritzbach from the Dachstein Massif, Mühlbach and Blühnbach from the Hochkönig.

Lower reaches: Lammer from the east, Torrener Bach (in the Blunau Valley) from the Berchtesgaden Alps, Taugl and Almbach from the Hintersee, both from the Osterhorn Group, Königsseer Ache from the Königssee, Kehlbach, Fischach from the lake Wallersee, Klausbach, Saalach the largest tributaries, Sur and Götzinger Achen on the Bavarian side, Oichten near Oberndorf and Moosach in the Salzburg-Upper Austrian border region.

== Hydroelectric power plants ==
Currently, there are 12 hydroelectric power plants on the Salzach. The power plants are listed beginning at the headwaters:

Dam	Nameplate capacity	Annual generation (Mio. kWh)
Schwarzach	120 MW	482
Wallnerau	13 MW	38
St. Veit	16 MW	67
St. Johann	16 MW	71
Urreiting	16 MW	76
Bischofshofen	16 MW	70
Kreuzbergmaut	18 MW	80
Werfen-Pfarrwerfen	16 MW	81
Gamp	8 MW	53
Sohlstufe Hallein	16 MW	81
Urstein	22 MW	120
Sohlstufe Lehen	13 MW	81

== Photos ==
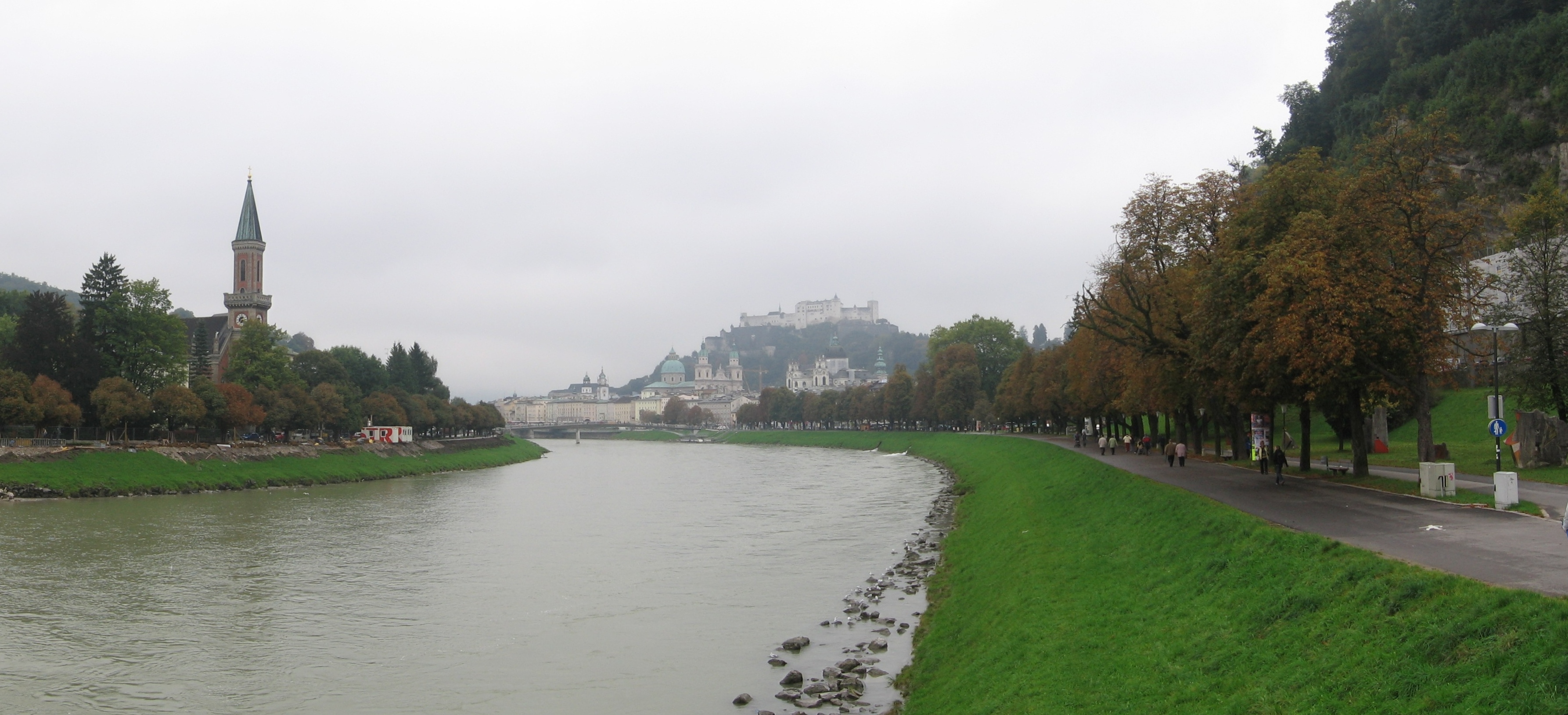
Salzach in Salzburg

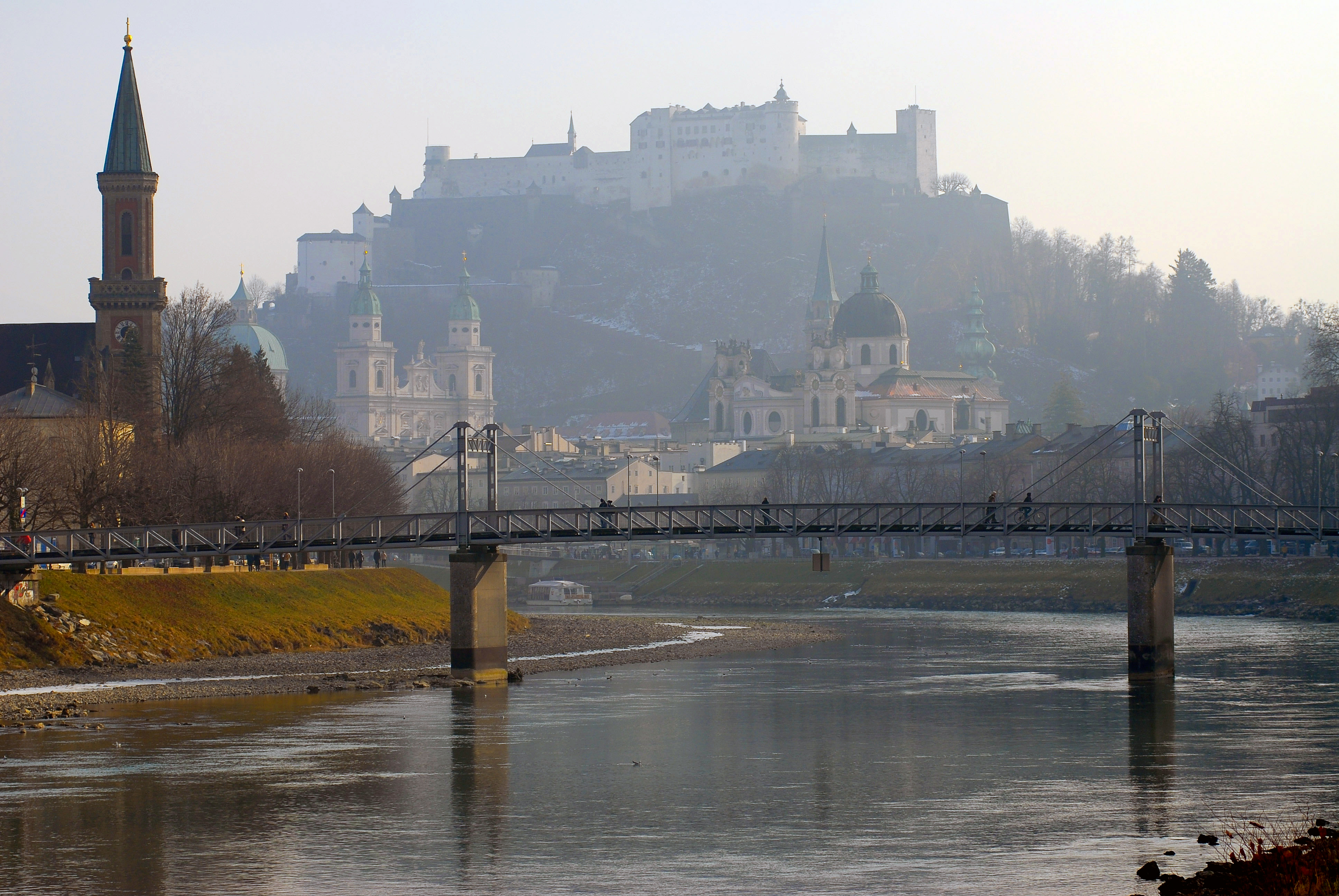
Salzach in Salzburg

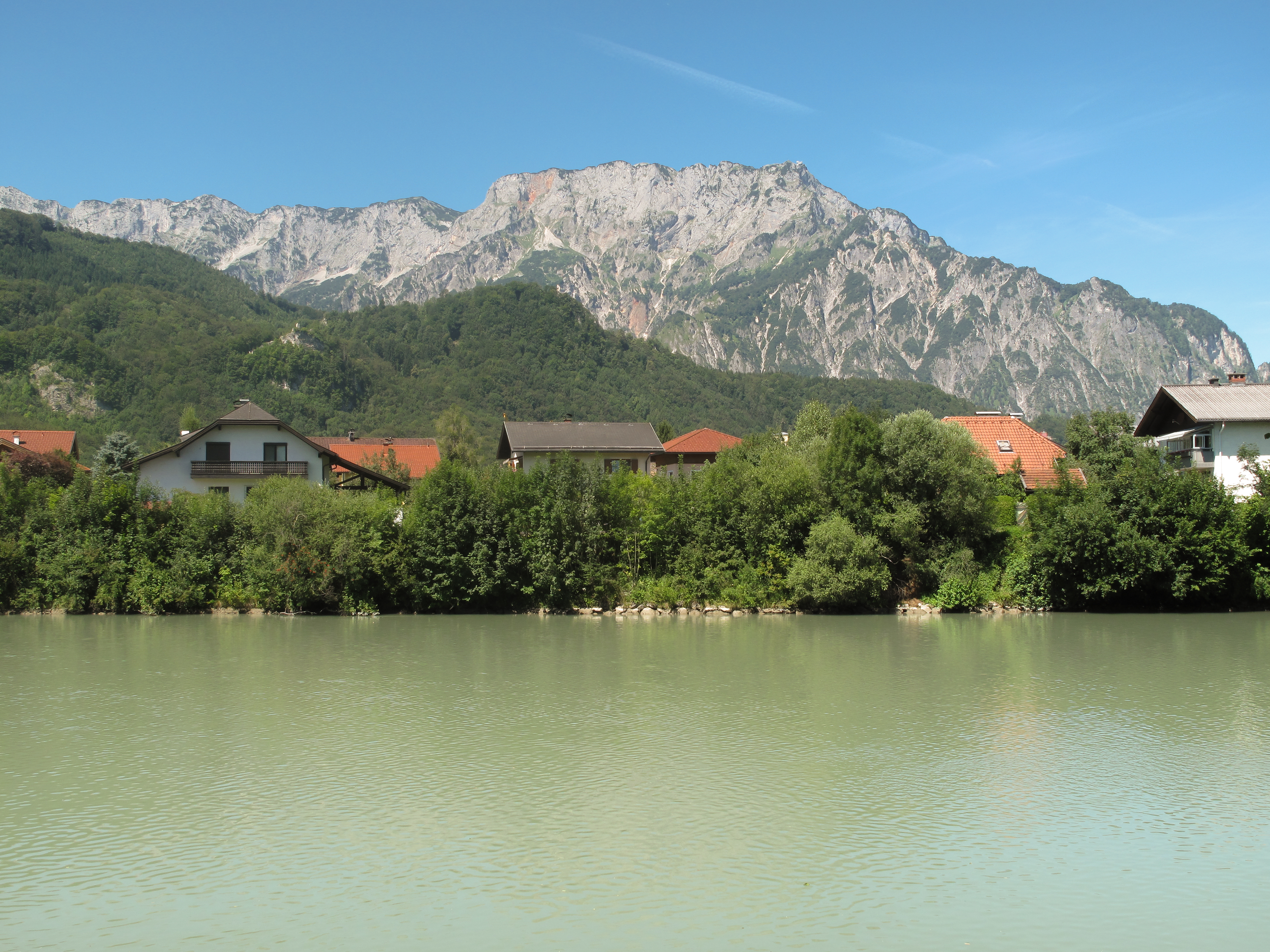
Salzach between Hallein and Salzburg

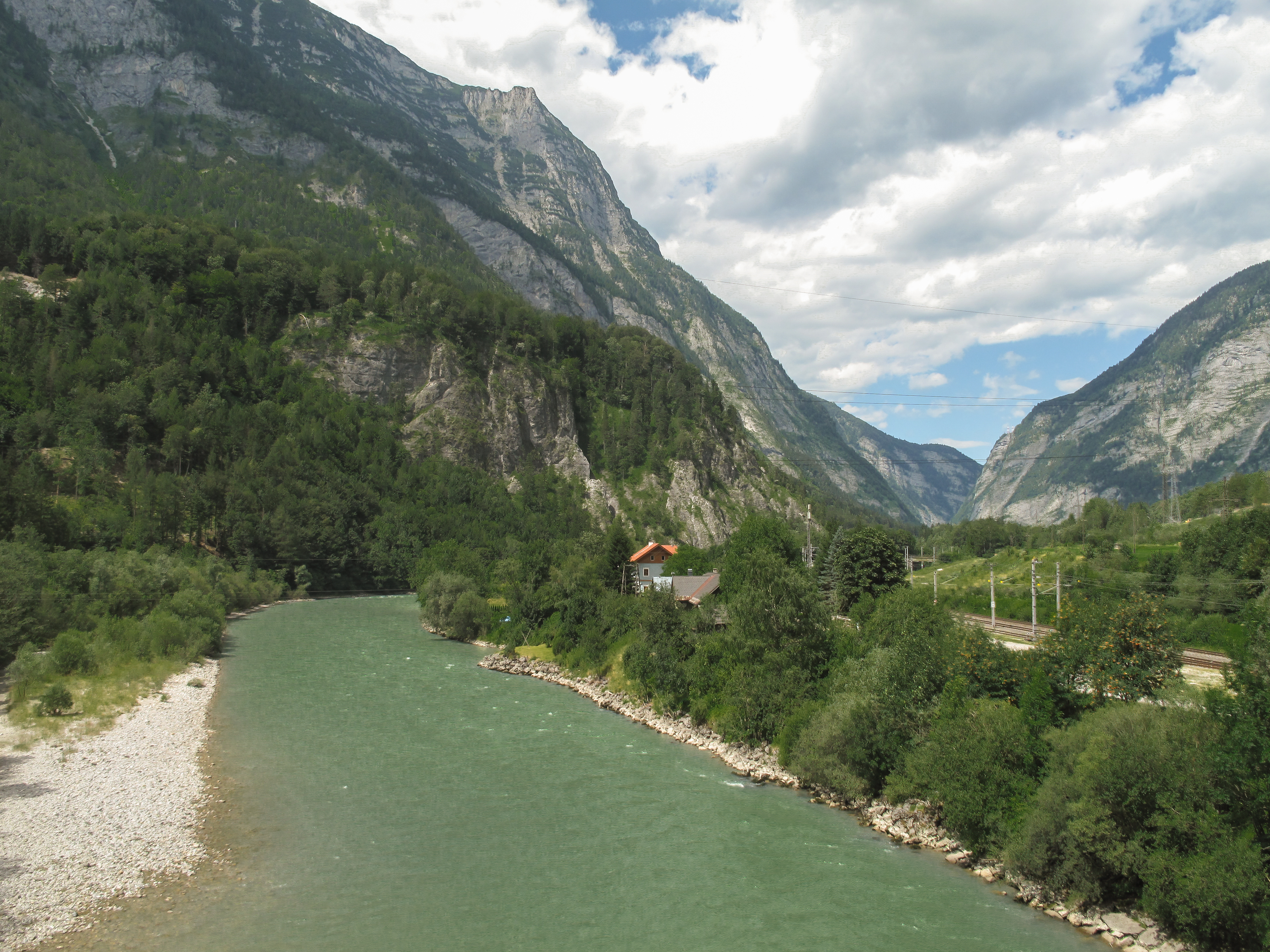
Salzach between Tenneck and Pass Lueg

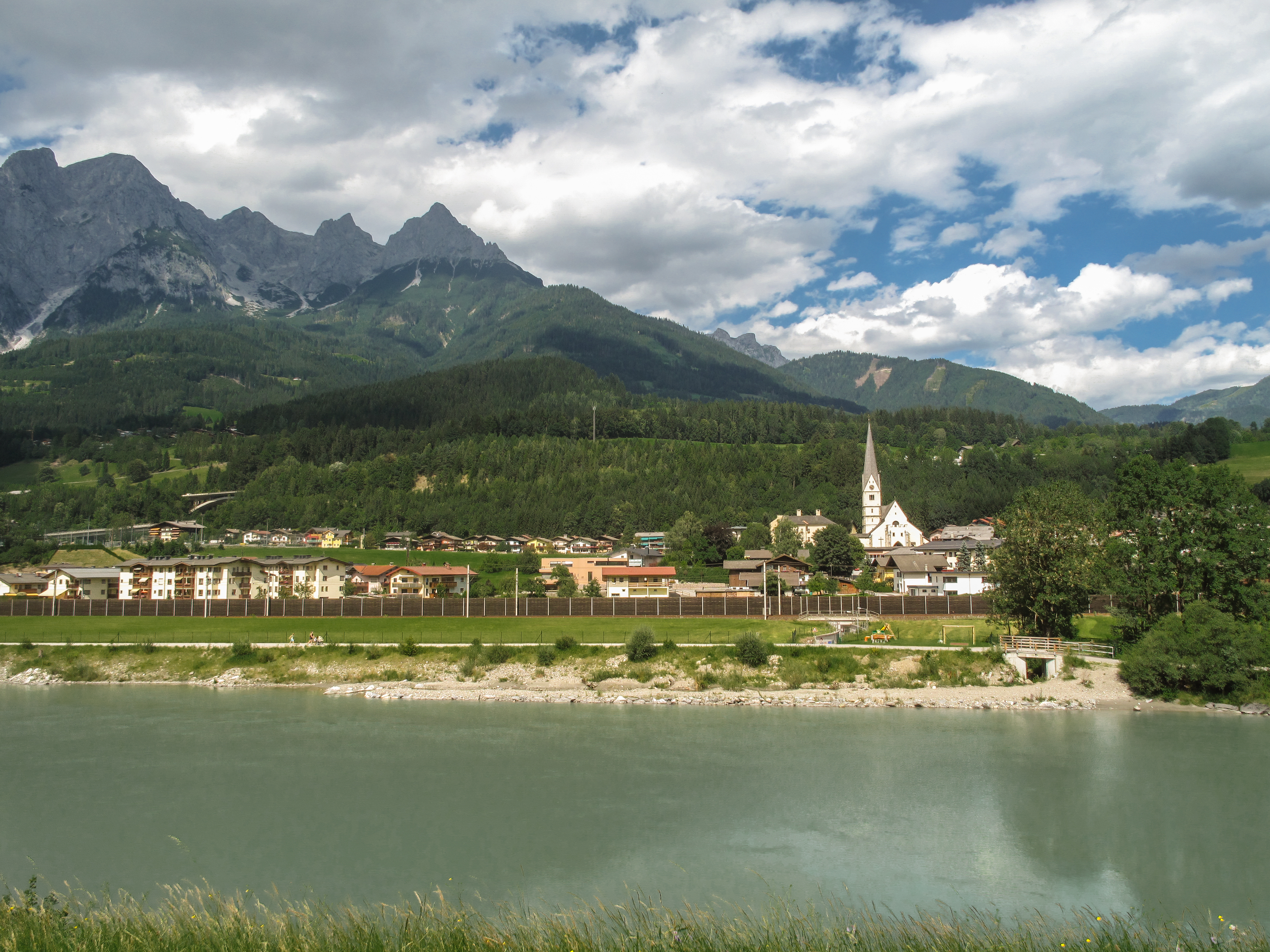
Salzach near Pfarrwerfen

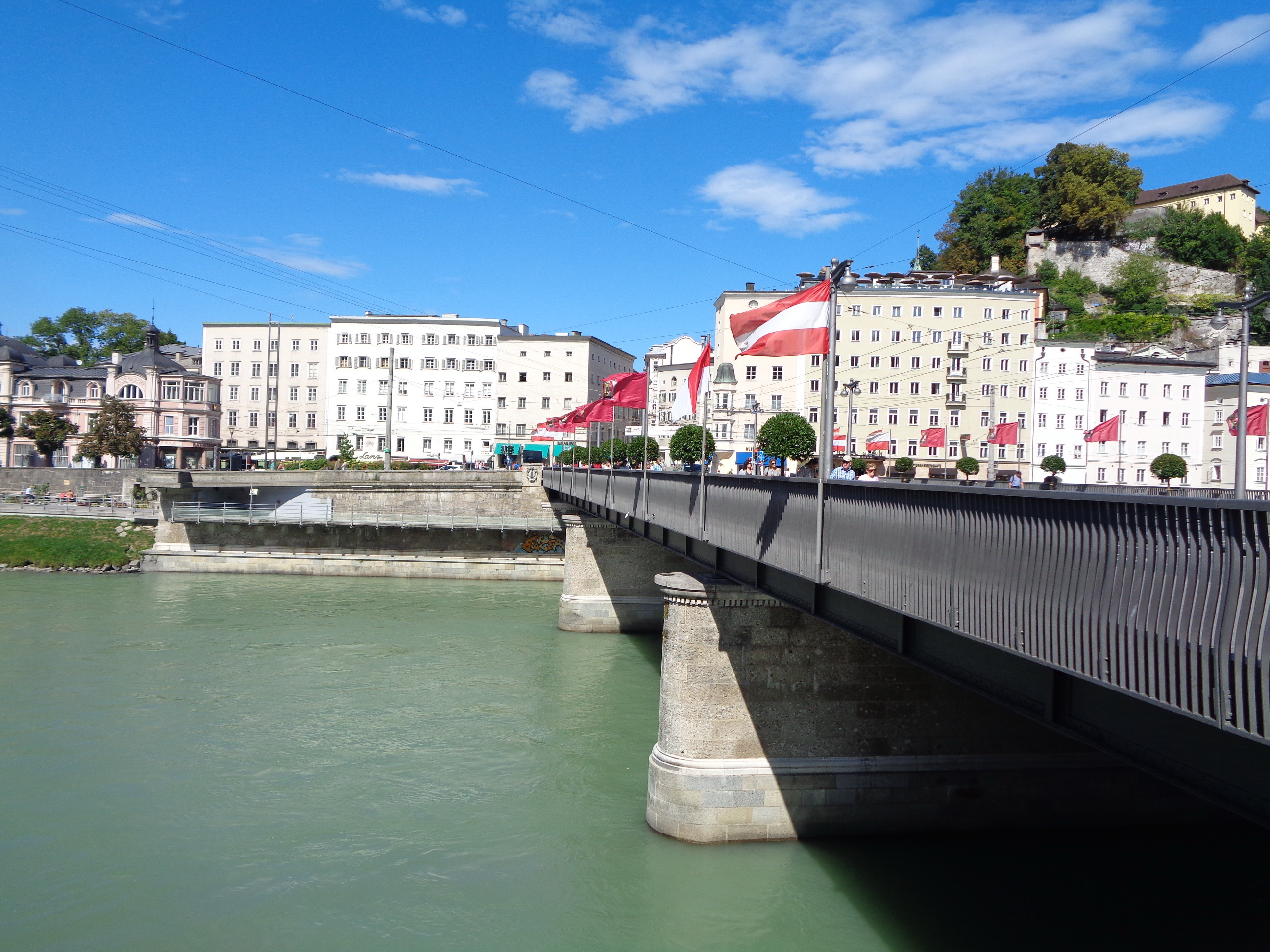
"Staatsbrücke" bridge over Salzach in Salzburg

== See also ==
- Salza (Austria)

== Sources ==
- Österreichisches Bundesministerium für Land- und Forstwirtschaft, Umwelt und Wasserwirtschaft: Die Salzach - ein Fluss bewegt! (PDF, 7,94 MB)
- Norbert Winding und Dieter Vogel (Hrsg.): Die Salzach. Wildfluss in der Kulturlandschaft. Verlag Kiebitz Buch, Vilsbiburg 2003, ISBN 3-9807800-1-5
