= Fischach (Salzach) =

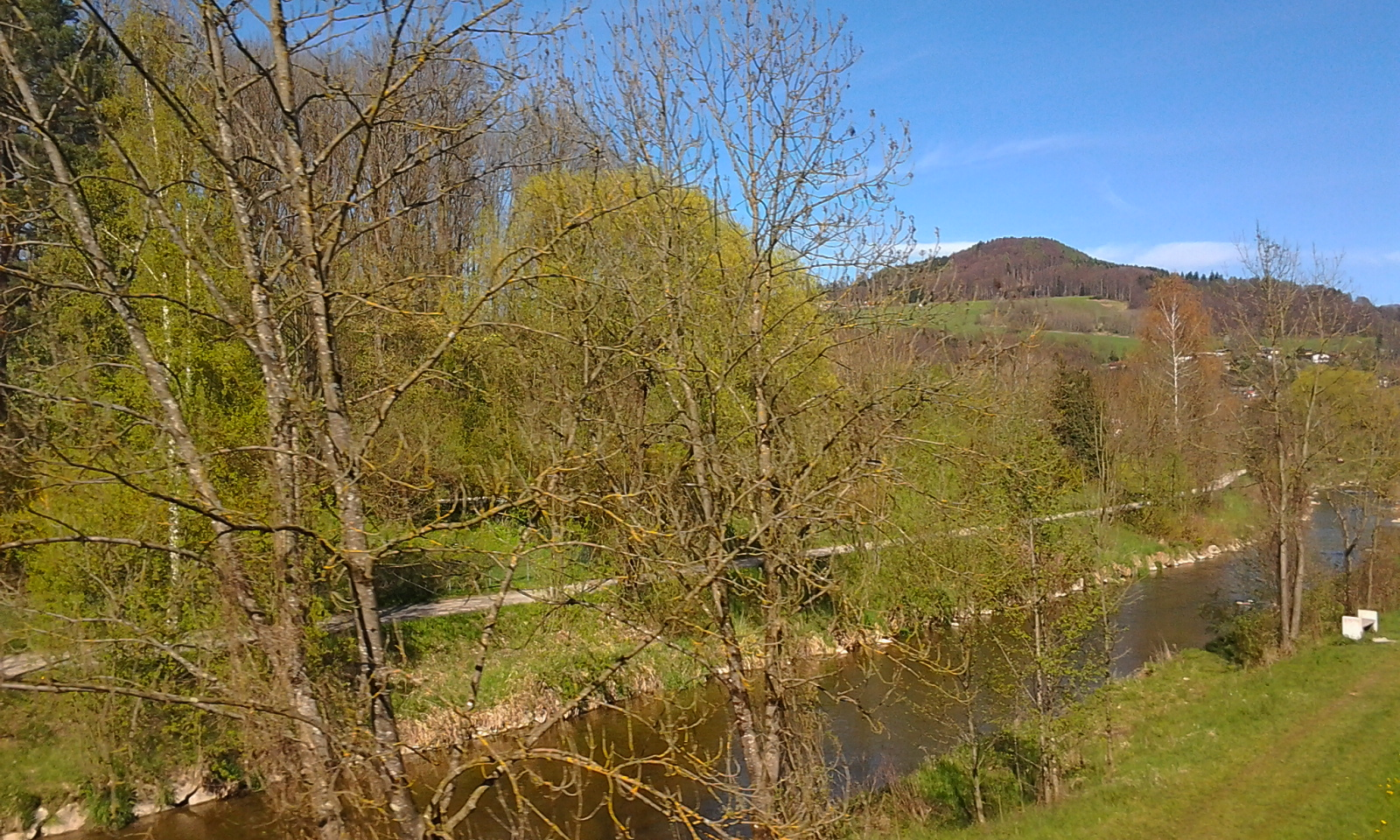
- The Fischach near its mouth, in Bergheim

Location
- Country: Austria
- State: Salzburg

Physical characteristics
- Mouth
  - location: Salzach
  - coordinates: 47.8503°N 13.0068°E

Basin features
- Progression: Salzach→ Inn→ Danube→ Black Sea

The Fischach (German pronunciation: [ˈfɪʃax]) is a river of the Salzburg state in Austria. It is a right tributary of the Salzach near Bergheim.
