= Martin Lucke =

German politician (born 1988)

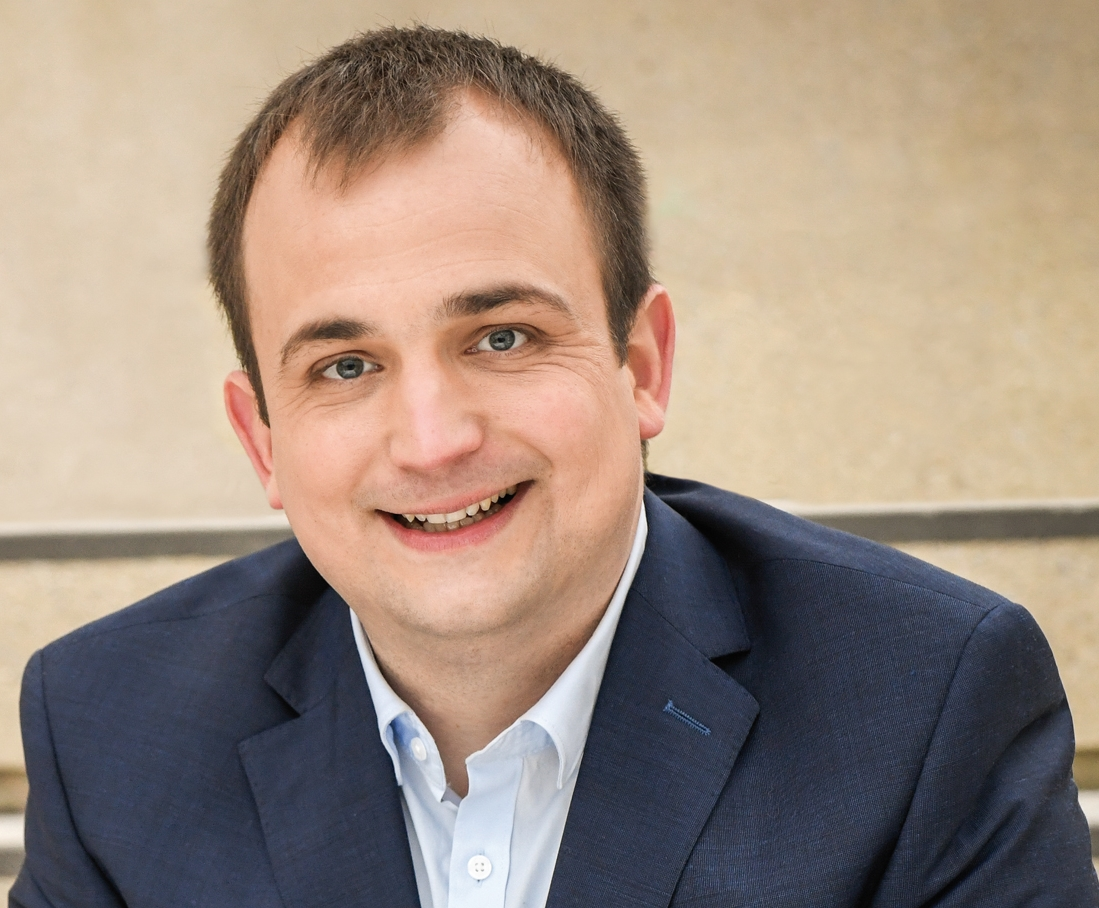
- Lucke in 2022

Member of the Landtag of North Rhine-Westphalia
- Incumbent
- Assumed office 1 June 2022
- Preceded by: Holger Müller
- Constituency: Rheinisch-Bergischer Kreis I

Personal details
- Born: 9 November 1988 (age 37) Bensberg, Bergisch Gladbach, North Rhine-Westphalia, West Germany
- Party: Christian Democratic Union (since 2007)

Martin Lucke (born 9 November 1988) is a German politician serving as a member of the Landtag of North Rhine-Westphalia since 2022. From 2012 to 2014, he served as chairman of the Young Union in Bergisch Gladbach.
