= Luck (short story) =

Short story by Mark Twain

"Luck" is an 1886 short story by Mark Twain which was first published in 1891 in Harper's Magazine. It was subsequently reprinted in 1892 in the anthology Merry Tales; the first British publication was in 1900, in the collection The Man That Corrupted Hadleyburg. It is one of Twain's more neglected stories, and received little critical attention upon its publication.

== Plot summary ==
The story concerns a decorated English military hero, Lord Arthur Scoresby, a total idiot who triumphs in life through good luck. At the time of the Crimean War Scoresby is a captain. Despite his complete incompetence, everyone misinterprets his performance, taking his blunders for military genius, and his reputation is enhanced with every false step he makes. At the climax of the story, Scoresby mistakes his right hand for his left and leads a charge in the wrong direction, surprising a Russian force which panics and causes a retreat of the Russian army, thus securing an Allied victory.

Another interpretation of the story is that the Reverend is simply jealous of the successes Scoresby has achieved. The Reverend, in the past, was an instructor at a military academy, where he taught a young Scoresby. According to the Reverend, Scoresby was a poor student, and "blundered" his way through promotions. When the war began, the Reverend joined the conflict, but with a lower rank of his ex-student. Throughout the story one can see that the Reverend is bitter, and his apparent distaste for the lord seems at odds with his role as a clergyman. The "absolute fool" in the story is not Scoresby, who ascended the ranks of the military through action, but rather the Reverend, who cannot accomplish anything in his lifetime. He also wrote something above the paper. [He wrote "this is not a fancy sketch. I got it from a clergyman who was an instructor at the Woolwich Military school forty years ago, and who vouched for its truth."—M.T.]

== Notes on the story ==
- The story is said by some to be based on a real person; Twain himself writes in a footnote to the story that it was "not a fancy sketch"; i.e., not a work of fancy or imagination. Twain had heard the story from his old friend and confidant Joseph Twichell (who appears in A Tramp Abroad as "Harris"), who was visited by a British chaplain who told him the tale of a famous general whose victories were entirely due to luck. However, Twain's footnote states that the story was related to him by an instructor at Woolwich Academy. One candidate for the famous soldier is Sir Garnet Wolseley. For other possible candidates who did not participate in the Crimean War, see https://www.victorianweb.org/history/crimea/beck/1.html The Victorian Web. 2005-08-15.
- Another possible candidate is James Yorke Scarlett as the details of the Crimean War battle strongly match those of the Charge of the Heavy Brigade in the Battle of Balaclava.

== See also ==
- The Irresponsible Captain Tylor, anime series in which supporting characters dispute whether the title character's success result from brilliance or luck.

Hamilton H. H. Beck: "Teaching Mark Twain's 'Luck' in Moldova" in: Europäische Begegnungen. Festschrift für Joseph Kohnen (Luxembourg 2006), 73-82.
