= Kurt Lück =

Nazi historian (1900–1942)

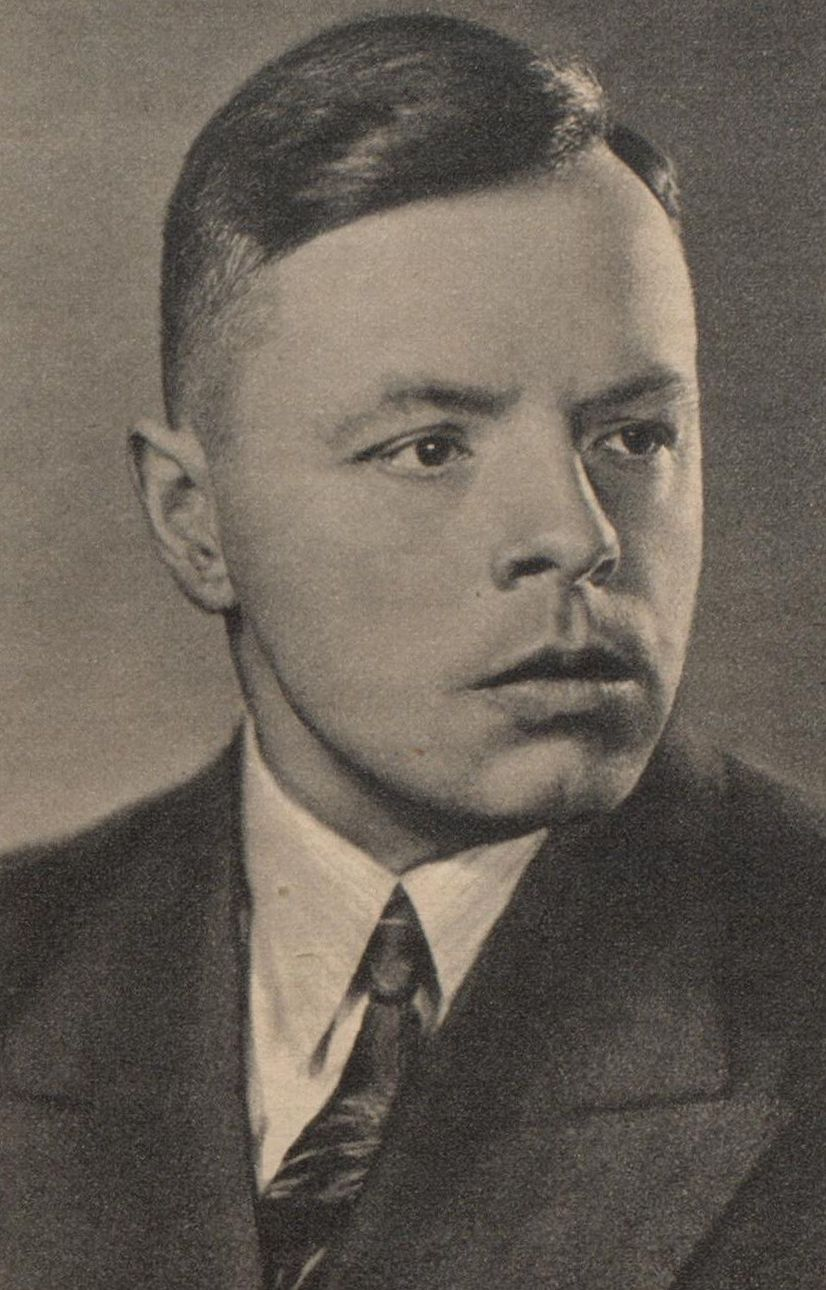
Portrait photo of Kurt Lück

Kurt Lück (December 28, 1900, in Kolmar (today Chodzież ), Province of Posen – March 5, 1942, near Orsha, Belarus) was a German historian and SS Obersturmbannführer. He was an ethnographer, an activist minority in Poland and lieutenant colonel in the body of SS officers, doctor of philosophical sciences.
