= Hannfried Lucke =

German organist and improviser (born 1964)

Hannfried Lucke (born 1964) is a German organist and improviser. He is a member of the organ faculty at Mozarteum University, Salzburg.

== Biography ==
Hannfried Lucke grew up in Freiburg im Breisgau, Germany, and received his musical training at Hochschule für Musik Freiburg, the Salzburg Mozarteum, and Geneva Conservatory. He earned the highest degree in church music (the "A examination") and also took a performance degree on the organ. From 1989 to 1991 he was a scholarship student of the German Academic Exchange Service. His awards include the Prize from the Austrian Ministry of Culture (1991) and the premier prix from Geneva Conservatory (1993).

His concert tours and broadcast recordings have taken him to the United States, Canada, Japan, Hong Kong, Australia, and most countries of Europe.

Many of his numerous recordings have been awarded prizes.

In 1997 he became a professor at the University of Music and the Performing Arts in Graz, and in 2000 he was appointed professor of organ at the Mozarteum University in Salzburg. Hannfried Lucke teaches master classes in Europe and the USA and is a jury member in organ competitions.
