= Rosa Papier =

Austrian opera singer

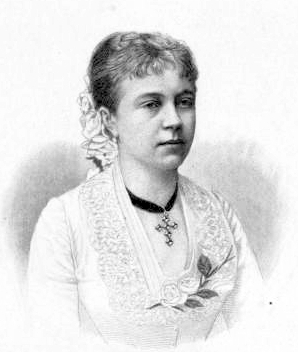
Rosa Papier

Rosa Papier, married name Paumgartner (18 September 1859 in Baden bei Wien – 9 February 1932 in Vienna) was an Austrian operatic soprano and vocal teacher.
