= Waldberg =

Waldberg may refer to:

== Places ==
- Waldberg (Bobingen), a constituent community of Bobingen, Augsburg, Bavaria, Germany
- Waldberg (Windigsteig), a village in Windigsteig, Lower Austria
- Waldberg (Ebbegebirge), a hill in the Ebbe Mountains, North Rhine-Westphalia, Germany
- Waldberg (Demmin), a village in Demmin, Mecklenburg-Vorpommern, Germany
- Waldberg (Sandberg), a village in Sandberg, Rhön-Grabfeld, Bavaria, Germany
  - DJK Waldberg, a football club in the village of Waldberg, near Sandberg, Bavaria, Germany
- German name of Borowo (1906–1920 and 1939–1945), village east of Szamocin in Poland
- Waldberg, the German name for Monte Baldo, a mountain ridge in South Tyrol

== People ==
- Max von Waldberg (1858–1938), German professor of modern literature
- Patrick Waldberg (1913–1985), Franco-American art critic

== See also ==
- Waldburg (disambiguation)
- Wildberg (disambiguation)
- Wildburg (disambiguation)
- Wildenburg (disambiguation)
- Vorderwaldberg
- Hinterwaldberg
