= Vorderwaldberg =

- Location within Austria
- Coordinates: 47°15′08″N 12°12′54″E
- Country: Austria
- State: Salzburg
- District: Zell am See

Area
  - Total: 2.3 km^{2} (0.89 sq mi)
- Elevation: 1,150 m (3,770 ft)

Population (1 January 2016)
  - Total: 1,152
  - Density: 500/km^{2} (1,300/sq mi)
- Time zone: UTC+1 (CET)
  - Summer (DST): UTC+2 (CEST)
- Postal code: 5742
- Area code: 06565
- Vehicle registration: ZE

Vorderwaldberg is a dispersed settlement in the Oberpinzgau, the upper Salzach valley and the district of Zell am See/Pinzgau, and also a village in the municipality of Wald im Pinzgau, on the southern edge of the Kitzbühel Alps in Austria.

== Geography ==
The settlement, which has about 90 inhabitants and 30 houses, lies up the valley from Wald im Salzachtal, on the southern slopes of the Salzach valley, the Vorderwaldberg, at an altitude between 950–1,300 metres (3,120–4,270 ft) on the Old Gerlos Road (Alten Gerlosstraße, the L 133).

The homesteads (Einöden) of Bachbauer and Watschbauer, and several other farmsteads belong to the village that extends for about 2.3 kilometres (1.4 mi) in an east–west direction.

== History ==
Vorderwaldberg lies on the old mule track (Saumpfad) from Mittersill as a trading hub on the route over the Gerlos Pass (Pinzgauer Höhe) to Zell am Ziller. It was upgraded into a cart track in 1631. In 1962 the new Gerlos Alpine Road (Gerlos Alpenstraße) via Krimml (today part of the B 165 Mittersill – Hainzenberg) was opened, that had been planned by graduate engineer Franz Wallack, the builder of the Großglockner High Alpine Road (Großglockner Hochalpenstraße). Consequently the Old Gerlos Road (Alte Gerlosstraße, today the L 133) lost its importance.

== Tourism and places of interest ==
The Sixt Chapel (Sixtkapelle) on the Sonnberg, below the Vorderwaldberg, on the Old Gerlos Road (47°14′54.9″N 12°12′57.2″E). Below the Sixtus Chapel lies the Augentrost Chapel (Augentrostkapelle) which is also worth a visit.

The Arno Trail (Arnoweg) runs through this village, from Hinterwaldberg and Lahn, as a climb to the Pinzgauer Spaziergang.
