= Lahn (Wald im Pinzgau) =

- Village of Wald im Pinzgau
- Location within Austria
- Coordinates: 47°14′33″N 12°12′28″E
- Country: Austria
- State: Salzburg
- District: Zell am See
- Elevation: 900 m (3,000 ft)

Population (1 January 2016)
  - Total: 1,152
- Time zone: UTC+1 (CET)
  - Summer (DST): UTC+2 (CEST)
- Postal code: 5742
- Area code: 06565
- Vehicle registration: ZE

Lahn (German pronunciation: [laːn]) is a dispersed settlement in the Oberpinzgau, the upper Salzach valley and the district of Zell am See/Pinzgau, and a village in the municipality of Wald im Pinzgau, on the southern rim of the Kitzbühel Alps.

== Geography ==
The settlement, which has about 280 inhabitants and 80 houses, lies higher up the valley from Wald and Vorderwaldberg on the southern slopes of the Salzach valley, between 900 metres (2,950 ft) on the valley floor and the B 165 Gerlos Road, 1,100 metres (3,610 ft) on the Old Gerlos Road (Alten Gerlosstraße), the L 133, (Ghf. Grübl) and 1,200 metres (3,940 ft) in the Lahnbauer wilderness with several other farmsteads. In addition the village has a halt, Lahnsiedlung, on the Pinzgauer Lokalbahn, the Postbus line 670 Zell am See – Krimml stops in the Finksiedlung.

Also part of the village are the eastern slopes of the Trattenbach valley – the western slopes belong to Rosental (Gemeinde Neukirchen) – to the north, with the alpine meadows of Besensteinalm, Wurfgrundalm, Wurf-Hochalm, Happingalm, Happing Hochalm on the Gernkogel and Trattenbachalm, Trattenbach-Hochalm on the Kröndlhorn. The parish area runs up to the state border with Tyrol at the Filzenscharte ridge, extending about 8.2 kilometres (5.1 mi) from north to south.

== History ==
Hinterwaldberg lies on the old bridle path from Mittersill, the trading centre, over the Gerlos Pass (Pinzgauer Höhe) to Zell am Ziller. It was upgraded in 1631 to a cart track. In 1962 the new Gerlos Alpine Road (today part of the B 165 from Mittersill to Hainzenberg), via Krimml, was opened. It was planned by Dipl. Ing. Franz Wallack, the builder of the Großglockner High Alpine Road. As a result, the Old Gerlos Road (Alte Gerlosstraße) lost its importance.

== Tourism and places of interest ==
The Arno Way (Arnoweg) runs through this village after crossing the River Salzach near Orgler en route from the Hinterwaldberg. It then climbs uphill to the Pinzgau Ridgeway above Lahn and continues to the Vorderwaldberg.
