= Hinterwaldberg =

- Location within Austria
- Coordinates: 47°14′52″N 12°09′17″E
- Country: Austria
- State: Salzburg
- District: Zell am See

Area
  - Total: 42.3487 km^{2} (16.3509 sq mi)
- Elevation: 1,250 m (4,100 ft)

Population (2001)
  - Total: 128
  - Density: 3.02/km^{2} (7.83/sq mi)
- Time zone: UTC+1 (CET)
  - Summer (DST): UTC+2 (CEST)
- Postal code: 5742
- Area code: 06565
- Vehicle registration: ZE

Hinterwaldberg is a dispersed settlement in the Oberpinzgau, the upper Salzach valley and the district of Zell am See/Pinzgau, and is a village and Katastralgemeinde in the municipality of Wald im Pinzgau, on the southern edge of the Kitzbühel Alps in Austria.

== Geography ==
The settlement, with about 130 inhabitants and 300 houses, lies on the southern slopes of the Salzach valley, the Hinterwaldberg, northwest and above the village of Wald, on the Old Gerlos Road (Alte Gerlosstraße), the L 133, which runs up to the Gerlos Pass (Pinzgauer Höhe), at heights of between 1,200–1,300 metres (3,940–4,270 ft).

The individual homesteads of Maut, Oberrankental, Reitlbauer, Seiten and Unterrankental, several farmsteads and the Ronachwirt inn. The Almdorf Königsleiten (1,896 metres or 6,220 feet) and its refuge hut, the Edelweißhaus (1,685 metres or 5,528 feet) at Gerlos, that belong to the Zillertal Arena ski area, were independent parishes several years ago, but now belong to the Katastralgemeinde.

In addition, Hinterwaldberg includes the following valleys, mountains and alms, that stretch north into the Kitzbühel Alps:

- on the southern slopes of the Gernkogel: Reitlasten, Bacherasten (Bacher Asten), Wiesachalm and Besensleinalm
- in the Nadernachbach valley: Bergeralm and Berger Hochalm towards Gernkogel, Bacheralm and Bacher Hochalm towards Baumgartgeier, Hieburgalm and Hiburg-Hochalm, Watsch-Niedernachalm and Watsch-Niedernach-Hochalm
- on the southern slopes of the Baumgartgeier/Ronachgeier: Putzalm, Prielalm (Prielhochalm ruins), Müller Mitterberg, Baxreinalm and Baxrain-Mitterberg (alsoPaxrain)
- in the high Salzach valley: Leienalm, Bucheckalm and Brucheck Mittelleger (Brucheck-Hochalm ruins) to Königsleiten/Müllachgeier, Mülleralm, Müller Hochalm, Mottland Grundalm, Salzachalm, Müllach-Grundalm and Müllach-Hochalm towards Salzachgeier and Salzachjoch saddle.

The Katastralgemeinde's territory includes the two high valleys of Salzachursprung and Nadernachbach, and the area between the Ochsenkopf in the west, the Schwebenkopf and Kröndlhorn in the north and the Gernkogel to the east, up to the state border with Tyrol. It measures 4,234.87 hectares (10,465 acres) in area and about 9.4 kilometres (5.8 mi) across at its widest point.

== History ==
Hinterwaldberg lies on the old mule track (Saumpfad) from Mittersill as a trading hub on the route over the Gerlos Pass (Pinzgauer Höhe) to Zell am Ziller. It was upgraded into a cart track in 1631. In 1962 the new Gerlos Alpine Road (Gerlos Alpenstraße) via Krimml (today part of the B 165 Mittersill – Hainzenberg) was opened, that had been planned by graduate engineer Franz Wallack, the builder of the Großglockner High Alpine Road (Großglockner Hochalpenstraße). Consequently the Old Gerlos Road (Alte Gerlosstraße, today the L 133) lost its importance.

== Tourism and places of interest ==
The Arno Trail (Arnoweg) runs through the village, having crossed the Salzach near Orgler after coming from Schloßberg. It then continues as a climbing path to the Pinzgauer Spaziergang above Lahn.
