= Waldburg (disambiguation) =

Waldburg is a town in the district of Ravensburg in Baden-Württemberg in Germany.

Waldburg may also refer to:

- House of Waldburg, a princely family of Upper Swabia
- Waldburg Castle, the ancestral castle of House of Waldburg in the district of Ravensburg, Germany
- Waldburg, Austria, a municipality in the district of Freistadt in the Austrian state of Upper Austria

== See also ==
- Waldberg (disambiguation)
- Wildberg (disambiguation)
- Wildburg (disambiguation)
- Wildenburg (disambiguation)
