= Aleitenspitze =

Austrian mountain in the Kitzbühel Alps

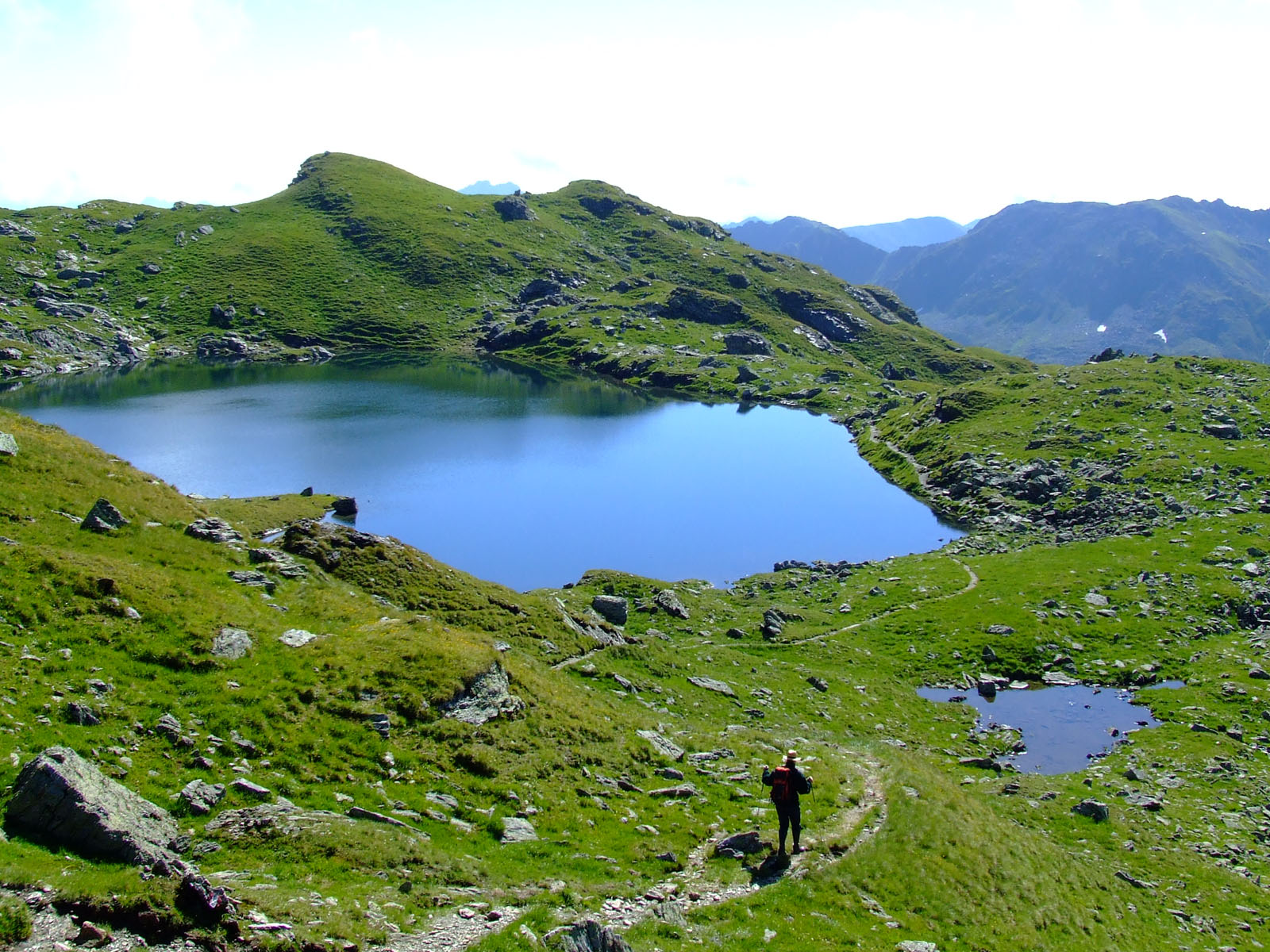
- The Upper Wildalm Lake (2,324 m) just below the summit

Highest point
- Elevation: 2,447 m (AA) (8,028 ft)
- Coordinates: 47°18′39″N 12°7′1″E

Geography
- Location within Austria
- Location: Tyrol, Austria
- Lakes: The three Wildalmsee lakes
- Parent range: Kitzbühel Alps

Climbing
- Normal route: From Kurzer Grund into the Kelchsau to the New Bamberg Hut and past the Wildalmsee lakes

The Aleitenspitze is a mountain, 2,449 m above sea level (AA), in the Kitzbühel Alps in Austria. It is one of the highest peaks on the main crest of the Kitzbühel Alps. It is usually climbed as part of an ascent of the nearby Schafsiedel (2,447 m) from the New Bamberg Hut, not least because of the 3 mountain lakes that are passed en route: the photogenic lower lake, the green middle lake and the rock-rimmed upper lake.

== Route to the summit ==
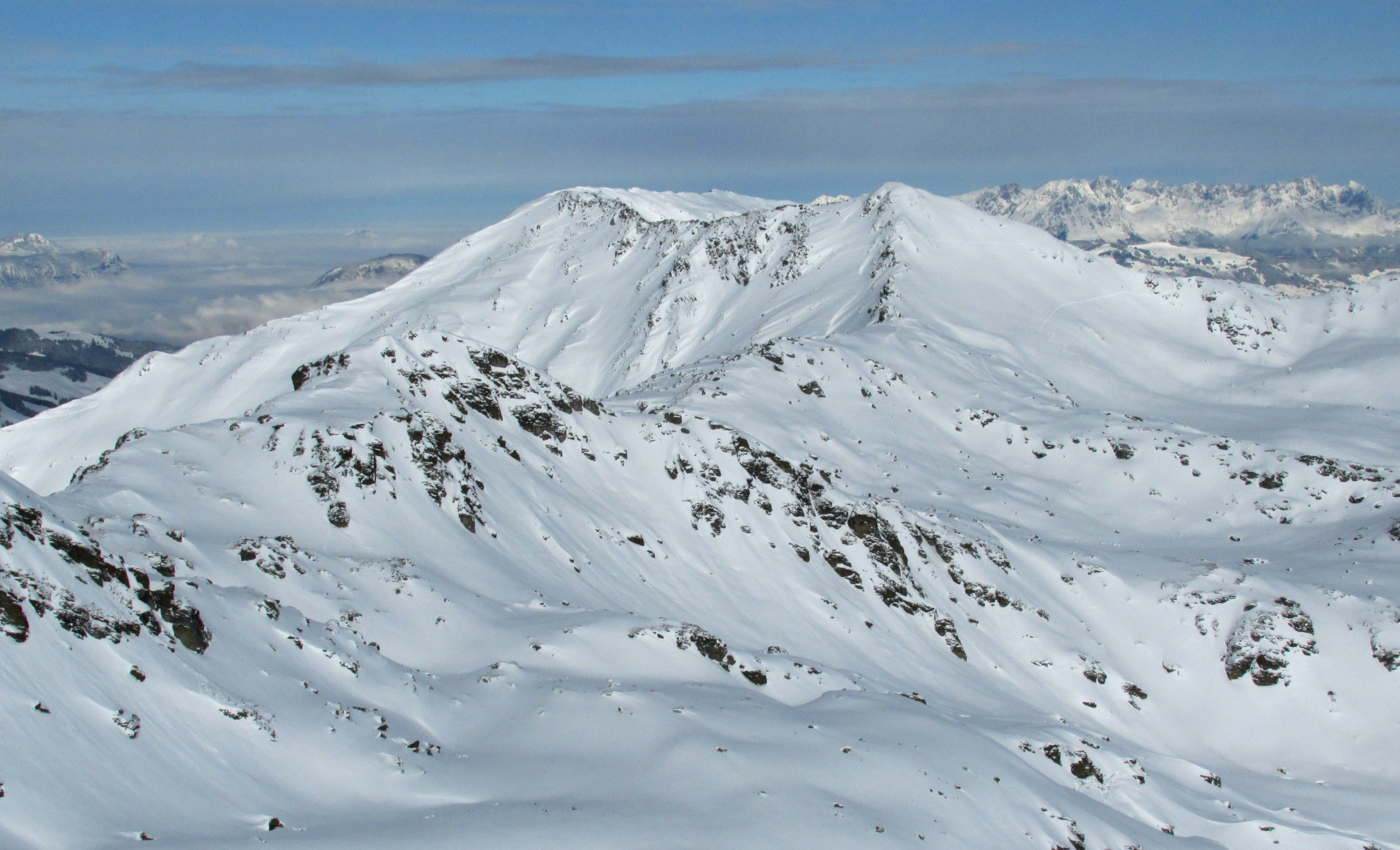
View in winter from the Salzachgeier of the Schafsiedel (left) and Aleitenspitze (right)

The valley of the Kurzer Grund in the Kelchsau is the starting point of the most commonly used approach route. It begins near an inn, the Gasthof Wegscheid (1,148 m), which is accessible by car over a metalled toll road. There are numerous unmetalled car parking areas near the inn.

The path climbs steeply up the wooded slopes above a mountain stream, the Kurzer Grund Ache, to the New Bamberg Hut (1,756 m) that perches on a hillside just above an Alpine meadow nestling amongst the surrounding peaks. Behind the hut, the path branches off to the Schafsiedel, climbing the steep, grassy slopes in a westerly direction to the picturesque Lower Wildalm Lake (Unterer Wildalmsee, 1,937 m), which is often frequented by anglers. The trail then climbs up to the Middle Wildalm Lake (Mittlerer Wildalmsee, 2,028 m), the largest of the 3 lakes by area, passing around it to the north on a low ridge before climbing steeply once more to the Upper Wildalm Lake (Oberer Wildalmsee, 2,324 m), one of the highest in the Kitzbühel Alps. The path follows the lakeshore for a short distance, before striking for the summit on a horseshoe-shaped ridge above the lake. The climb to the Schafsiedel is particularly steep. From there the ridgeline curves away to the Aleitenspitze. The crossing is rocky but not difficult. The descent to the New Bamberg Hut may be made by continuing down the ridgeline or by returning to the Schafsiedel.
