= Karl Renner Prize =

Austrian award

The Karl Renner Prize, established on the occasion of the Austrian Federal President Karl Renner's 80th birthday by the city of Vienna, is awarded to individuals or groups in recognition of merits for Vienna and Austria in cultural, social as well as economic concerns, acknowledged on a national or international level. Endowed with 43,600 euro, the prize is currently given to a maximum of six nominees every three years.

== Prize winners ==
=== 1951 ===
- Leopold Kunschak
- Johann Böhm
- Ludwig Brim (train dispatcher of the ÖBB, jumped on a driverless locomotive and successfully stopped it)
- Amalie (Mela) Hofmann (head of the nursery of the Zentralkrippenverein in der Lainzer Straße 172)
- Rudolf Keck (introduced a more economical method of gas creation to the Gaswerk Simmering)
- Hans Radl (teacher and disabled ex-service man, found a school for disabled children in the Kauergasse in 1926, was appointed to an international expert for instruction and education of disabled children by the UNESCO in 1951)
- Ewald Schild
- Entminungsdienst
- Wiener Philharmoniker
- Wiener Symphoniker

=== 1952 ===
- Ewald Balser
- Hilde Wagener
- Edmund Josef Bendl (teacher and author, got citizens donating for the maintenance of the Observatorium Sonnblick with his lectures, his novel Der Sonnblick ruft and the movie adaptation)
- Martin Gusinde
- Paul Schiel (fisherman, rescued eight people from drowning despite his complete invalidity)
- Stefanie Tesar (welfare worker at the Fürsorgestelle im Landesgericht für Strafsachen und ehrenamtliche Mitarbeiterin in der Lebensmüden- und Trinkerfürsorge der Wiener Polizeidirektion)
- Hans Thirring
- Franz Wallack
- Österreichischer Buchklub der Jugend
- Österreichischer Bergrettungsdienst

=== 1953 ===
- Bruno Buchwieser (son of Bruno Buchwieser, devoted to apprenticeship)
- Hans Kelsen
- Adolf Melhuber (dedicated his life to the work with the blind)
- Franz Schuster
- Wendelin Wallisch (prevented gas explosion by throwing himself into the igniting flame)
- Helene Thimig-Reinhardt
- Karl Weigl
- Federal administration in Vienna of the Österreichischen Jugendrotkreuzes
- Theater der Jugend
- Verein Arbeitermittelschule

=== 1954 ===
- Herbert Tichy, traveller and mountain climber
- Franz Salmhofer, composer and director of the opera
- Ilse Arlt (founder of the first welfare school, named Vereinigte Fachkurse für Volkspflege)
- Karl Mühl (expert in care for the deaf-mute, teacher at school for the deaf-mute, took care of hard of hearing soldiers in the Second World War, rebuilt the institute for the deaf-mute in Wien-Speising)
- Gustav Reinsperger (was taken into captivity as a prisoner of war by the Americans in 1945 and delivered to Russia, worked initially in emergency service and conducted military hospitals in several prisoner-of-war camps between 1950 and 1953)
- Österreichische Akademie der Wissenschaften

=== 1955 ===
- Julius Raab
- Adolf Schärf
- Leopold Figl
- Bruno Kreisky

=== 1956 ===
- Hans Hirsch (head of the Kriegsblindenverband)
- Franz Lagler (prevented an explosion as a filling station attendant in Vienna)
- Fritz Moravec
- Walther oder Walter Peinsipp (Austrian diplomat in Hungary, organised relief convoy during the Hungarian Revolution of 1956.
- Workers of Kaprun (all involved in building the power station in Kaprun)

=== 1957 ===
- Oskar Helmer
- Felix Hurdes
- Österreichischer Bundesjugendring
- Wiener Singakademie
- Singverein der Gesellschaft der Musikfreunde

=== 1958 ===
- Andreas Rett
- Friedrich Weinhofer (locksmith and welder, prevented two explosions in the heat plant Malfattigasse in 1951 and 1958 respectively. Suffered from severe burns as a consequence.)
- Georg Piller und Gottfried Reisinger (Piller, a chauffeur, and Reisinger, a mechanic, helped capturing a robber suspected of murder, who severely injured them both by shooting.)
- Haus der Barmherzigkeit
- Wiener Berufsschulgemeinde
- Verband Wiener Volksbildung

=== 1959 ===
- Igo Etrich
- Ferdinand Kadečka (Austrian jurist)
- Fritz Kreisler (awarded in the USA)
- Bruno Walter
- Inventors of the Linz-Donawitz-Verfahren steelmaking (Ortwin Cuscoleca, Felix Grohs, Hubert Hauttmann, Fritz Klepp, Wolfgang Kühnelt, Rudolf Rinesch, Kurt Rösner, Herbert Trenkler)
- Krankenhaus der Barmherzigen Brüder
- Pilotes of the Flugrettungsdienstes

=== 1960 ===
The Karl Renner Prize was not awarded in 1960.

=== 1961 ===
- Josef Hanns (prevented an explosion by driving a burning tank wagon away from a storage)
- Johann Heilmann (as a train operator, he prevented a train accident and was severely injured in the process)
- Stefan Jellinek
- Erwin Ringel
- Hans Rotter (secretary in association Trinkerheilstätte)
- Gesellschaft der Musikfreunde

=== 1962 ===
The Karl Renner Prize was not awarded in 1962.

=== 1963 ===
- Verein der Wiener Sängerknaben
- Verein Österreichische Krebsgesellschaft
- Notring der wissenschaftlichen Verbände Österreichs
- Österreichische Himalaya-Gesellschaft

=== 1964 ===
The Karl Renner Prize was not awarded in 1964.

=== 1965 ===
- Universität Wien
- Technische Hochschule Wien

=== 1966 ===
- Musikalische Jugend Österreichs
- Chorvereinigung „Jung-Wien“
- Chor des Österreichischen Gewerkschaftsbundes under the guidance of Erwin Weiss
- Aktion Jugend am Werk

=== 1967 ===
- University of Music and Performing Arts, Vienna
- Wiener Konzerthausgesellschaft
- Verband österreichischer Volksbüchereien
- Hugo Portisch ?
- Gerhard Weis ?

=== 1969 ===
- Erich Lessing?

=== 1974 ===
- Sigrid Löffler?

=== 1975 ===
- Felix Unger, Johann Navratil, Kurt Polzer
- Wolfgang Enenkel

=== 1978 ===
- Karl Popper

=== 1984 ===
- Dieter Zehentmayr?

=== 1986 ===
- Kardinal Franz König
- „Österreichische Arbeitsgemeinschaft Zöliakie“

=== 1988 ===
- Gerhard Kletter

=== 1989 ===
- „Autonome österreichische Frauenhäuser“

=== 1991 ===
- Erwin Kräutler
- „Informationsstelle gegen Gewalt“

=== 1996 ===
- Arthur Schneier

=== 1998 ===
- Georg Sporschill
- Jüdisches Institut für Erwachsenenbildung
- Verein Künstler helfen Künstler

=== 2001 ===
- Ute Bock
- Willi Resetarits
- "one world foundation"
- „Orpheus Trust“
- Verein für Zivilcourage und Anti-Rassismus-Arbeit ZARA

=== ? ===
- Ronald Barazon
- Fritz Csoklich
- Egon Blaschka
- Václav Havel

=== 2004 ===
- Ursula Seeber
- FIBEL (Fraueninitiative Bikulturelle Ehen und Lebensgemeinschaften),
- PEREGRINA (Bildungs-, Beratungs- und Therapiezentrum für Immigrantinnen)

=== 2007 ===
- Reporters Without Borders
- „Verein Unabhängiger Iranischer Frauen in Österreich (GIF)“
- „Wiener Tafel“

=== 2010 ===
- Hemayat
- Steine der Erinnerung
- Theodor Kramer Gesellschaft

=== 2013 ===
- Andreas Maislinger
- Austrian Mauthausen Committee
- Irene Suchy
