= Wildenberg (disambiguation) =

Wildenberg is a municipality in the county of Kelheim, Bavaria, Germany.

Wildenberg may also refer to:

- Wildenberg Castle (Kirchzell), a ruined castle in the Odenwald hills in Bavaria, Germany
- Wildenberg Castle (Zernez) in Zernez in the Lower Engadine, canton of Graubünden, Switzerland

== See also ==
- Wildberg (disambiguation)
- Wildenburg (disambiguation)
