= Wildberg =

Wildberg may refer to:

- Wildberg, Baden-Württemberg, a town in the district of Calw, Baden-Württemberg, Germany
- Wildberg, Mecklenburg-Vorpommern, a municipality in the district of Demmin, Mecklenburg-Vorpommern, Germany
- Wildberg, Switzerland, a municipality in the canton of Zürich, Switzerland
- Wildberg (Rätikon), 2788 m high mountain in the Rätikon mountain range, Vorarlberg, Austria
- 117506 Wildberg, an asteroid named after Wildberg in Baden-Württemberg

People with the last name Wildberg:

- Christian Wildberg (born 1957), German classical scholar
- John Wildberg (1902–1959), American copyright attorney
- Heiko Wildberg (born 1952), German politician

== See also ==
- Waldberg (disambiguation)
- Waldburg (disambiguation)
- Wildburg (disambiguation)
- Wildenburg (disambiguation)
