= Wildburg =

Wildburg may refer to the follow castles in Germany:

- Wildburg (Sargenroth), a ruined castle near Sargenroth in the Hunsrück mountains of Germany
- Wildburg (Treis-Karden), a castle in the municipality of Treis-Karden on the River Moselle

== See also ==
- Waldberg (disambiguation)
- Waldburg (disambiguation)
- Wildberg (disambiguation)
- Wildenburg (disambiguation)
