= Salzachgeier =

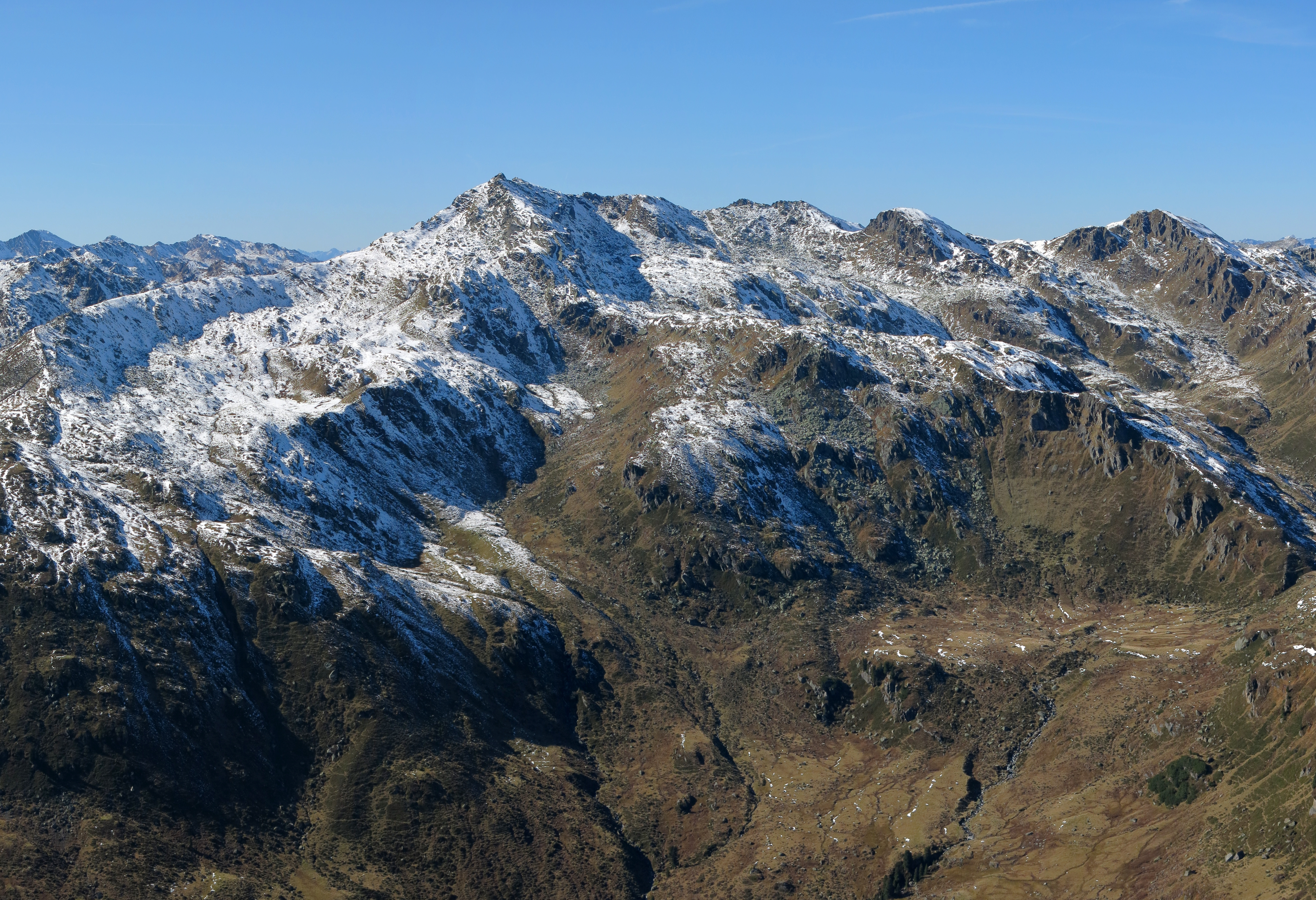
- The Salzachgeier seen from east

Highest point
- Elevation: 2,469 m (AA) (8,100 ft)
- Coordinates: 47°17′37″N 12°06′13″E

Geography
- Location within Austria
- Location: Tyrol / Salzburg border, Austria
- Parent range: Kitzbühel Alps

The Salzachgeier (2,469 m above sea level (AA)) is a rugged peak on the edge of the Kitzbühel Alps on the border of the Austrian states of Salzburg and Tyrol. In the cirques and high alpine meadows (Hochalmen) of its eastern slopes and the two neighbouring peaks of Fünfmandling (2,401 m) and Schwebenkopf (2,354 m) are the headstreams of the Salzach, the largest river north of the Salzburg Central Alps.

The Salzachgeier has a double summit where five sharp ridges run together. The eastern summit is only three metres lower and towers immediately above the aforementioned source regions (the Salzachboden and Schwebenalm).

Whilst the southern slopes of the three peaks descend towards the Gerlos Pass, the watershed to the north (the Salzachjoch 1,983 m) is only a kilometre from the eastern cirques. Here on the state border, high over the Roßwildalm, is a mountain chapel, the Markkirchl (St. Mark's Chapel) and somewhat lower down is the New Bamberg Hut run by the German Alpine Club (DAV). To the west, the slopes are just as steep, but less rocky, and drain into the Frommbach stream in the direction of Kitzbühel.

The Salzachgeier is part of the touring area for the Bamberg Hut and is a popular ski tour in winter.

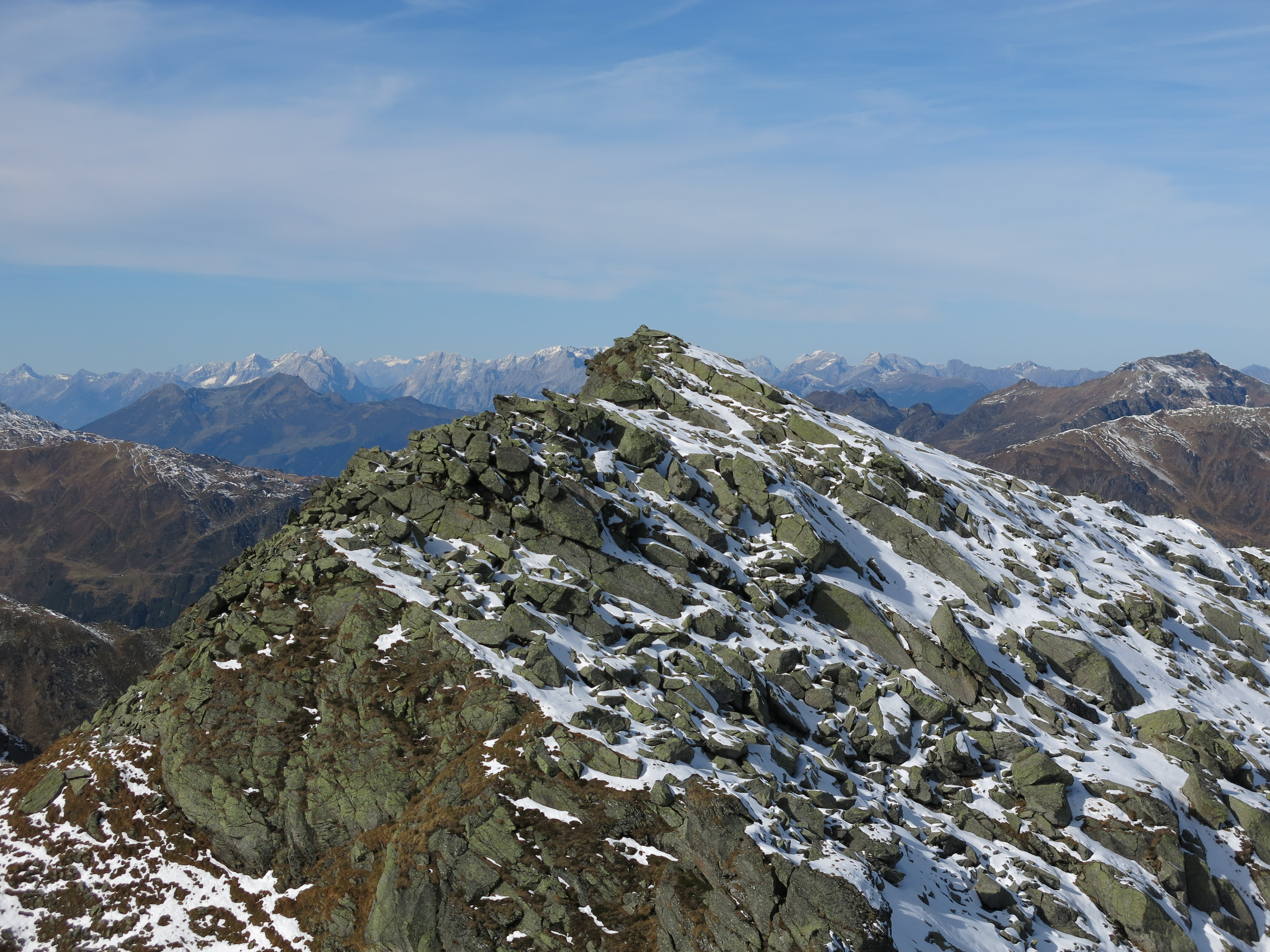
View from the eastern summit to the western summit
