= Wallackhaus =

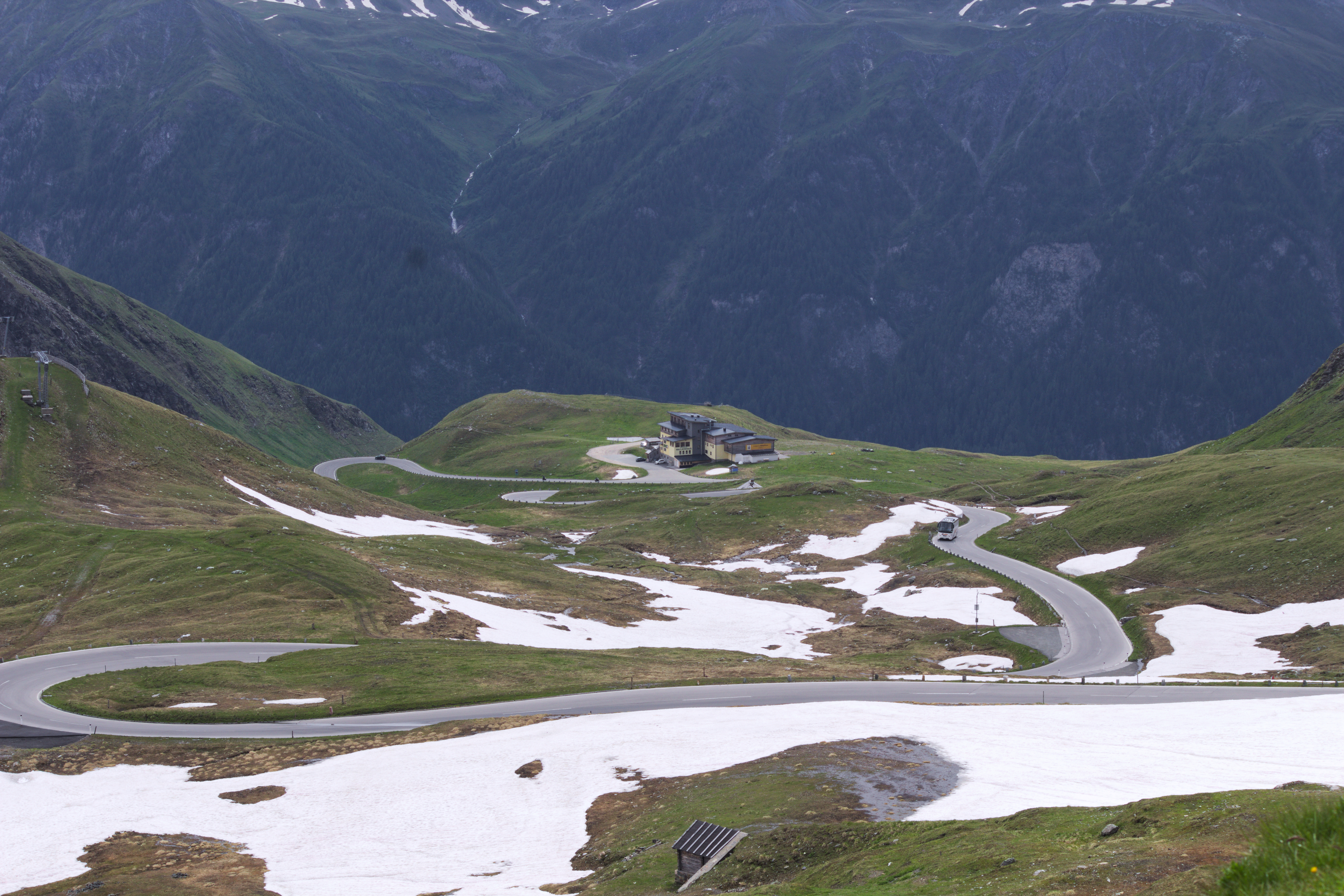
- Wallackhaus on the Grossglockner High Alpine Road

General information
- Location: Grossglockner High Alpine Road
- Coordinates: 47°4′13″N 12°50′19″E
- Elevation: 2,304 m (7,559 ft)
- Year built: 1930
- Owner: Regiojet Hotels

The Wallackhaus is a mountain hut located on the Grossglockner High Alpine Road in the Austrian state of Carinthia. Immediately to the east is the Großglockner - Heiligenblut ski area. The Wallackhaus was created in 1930 from a canteen for the construction workers on Großglocknerstrasse, south of the tunnel on the Hochtor Pass. The house was named after the engineer Franz Wallack, who was commissioned to plan the road.

== History ==
After the construction work was completed, the house developed into an inn serving tourism in 1935. In 1951, an avalanche destroyed the Wallackhaus, which was then only managed in summer, and it was rebuilt elsewhere in the summer of the same year. Since the mid-1990s, the house has been adapted to the growing needs of tourism, especially motorcycle tourism, through modernization and fundamental expansion.
