= Wald im Pinzgau =

- Municipality
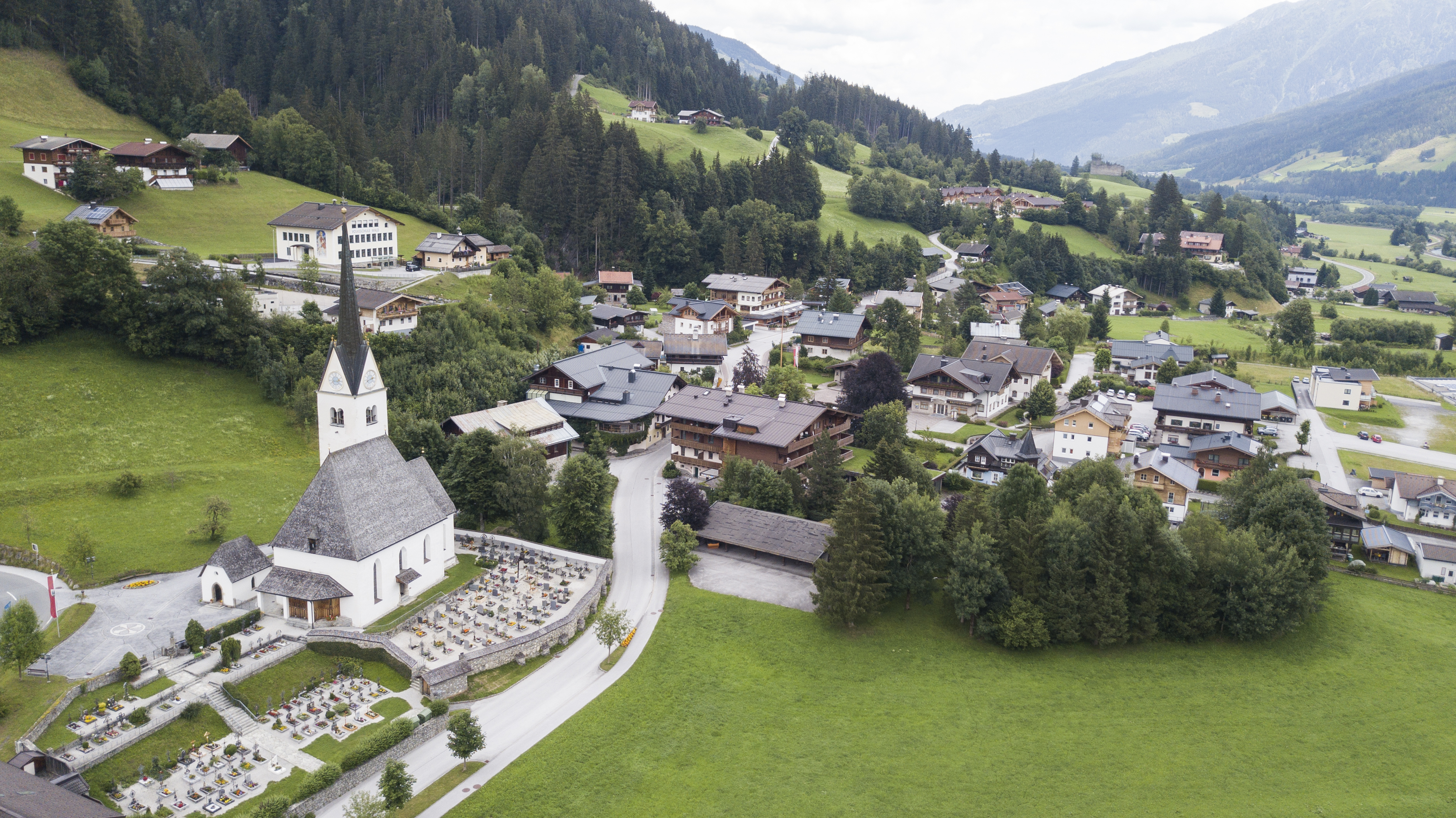

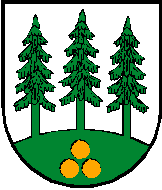
- Coat of arms

- Location within Austria
- Coordinates: 47°15′00″N 12°13′00″E
- Country: Austria
- State: Salzburg
- District: Zell am See

Government
  - Mayor: Michael Obermoser (ÖVP)

Area
  - Total: 69.24 km^{2} (26.73 sq mi)
- Elevation: 885 m (2,904 ft)

Population (2018-01-01)
  - Total: 1,124
  - Density: 16.23/km^{2} (42.04/sq mi)
- Time zone: UTC+1 (CET)
  - Summer (DST): UTC+2 (CEST)
- Postal code: 5742
- Area code: 06565
- Vehicle registration: ZE
- Website: www.wald.salzburg.at

Wald im Pinzgau is a municipality in the district of Zell am See (Pinzgau region), in the state of Salzburg in Austria.

== Municipal divisions ==
The villages in the municipality, apart from Wald, are (further up the valley) Hinterwaldberg, Königsleiten, Lahn, Vorderkrimml, and Vorderwaldberg, with a combined population of about 800.
The so-called Katastralgemeinden are Hinterwaldberg with 4,234.87 ha and Wald with 2,688.97 ha.

== Population ==
Historical population
Year	Pop.	±%
1869	511	—
1880	504	−1.4%
1890	515	+2.2%
1900	575	+11.7%
1910	612	+6.4%
1923	594	−2.9%
1934	656	+10.4%
1939	536	−18.3%
1951	775	+44.6%
1961	847	+9.3%
1971	937	+10.6%
1981	977	+4.3%
1991	1,022	+4.6%
2001	1,176	+15.1%
2011	1,155	−1.8%
