= Ferdinand Kadečka =

Austrian penologist

Ferdinand Kadečka (July 16, 1874 – March 14, 1964) was an Austrian penologist.

== Early life ==
He was born in Vienna. He was a son of Leopoldine Hák and Ferdinand Kadečka, an insurance officer.

Kadečka studied at Schottengymnasium in Vienna. Originally determined to study philology, at his father's request he enrolled at the Faculty of Law in Vienna in 1892, which he left in 1898 as a doctor of law.

His interest in criminal law was awakened by Alexander Löffler during his judicial preparation. After four years of work as a public prosecutor, he was appointed to the Ministry of Justice in 1912, in whose criminal justice department he worked for 22 years, ultimately as its head.

When, after the collapse of the Austrian monarchy, the resumption of criminal law reform came up for discussion, he advocated cooperation with the German Reich.

He submitted a counter-draft of the General Part to the German draft criminal law in 1919 in 1920, which was the start of the joint German-Austrian Draft criminal law of 1927, which fell victim to the political developments of 1933 after several years of parliamentary treatment.

In 1912, he married Theodora Ehrenberg; they had a daughter and a son.

He died in Vienna.

== Career ==
In addition to working on the great reform, Kadečka understood the main concerns of Franz von Liszt-established criminal law school in several amendments and individual laws. In 1954 the efforts to introduce a new criminal law were concluded with the Austrian Criminal Code of January 23, 1974 - began again. Kadečka took over the chairmanship of the reform commission, which was retained until 1962, but also presented the drafts of the provisions to be discussed that he had drawn up.

Kadečka's legislative work is characterized by a clear structure, consistent implementation of the program on which it is based, and language that is easy to understand. The comments he wrote on the Deletion Act of 1918, the Juvenile Court Act of 1928, the Draft Criminal Law of 1927 and the presentation of the press law of 1922 published in 1931 contributed significantly to the rapid integration of the often revolutionary laws into legal practice.

The focus of Kadečka's scientific work, which was carried out at University of Vienna, was the problem of guilt and a reaction to the crime based purely on special prevention. In 1922, he received the license to teach criminal law and criminal procedure law. He became a professor in 1934, succeeding Wenzeslaus von Gleispach. Starting from a strict determinism, he developed a doctrine of guilt based on the character of the perpetrator as an expression of his dangerousness and a strictly subjective experimental theory, to which he contrasted the allegiance and illegality as purely objective elements of crime. The unwavering consistency with which he championed his theses were somewhat unrealistic.

From August 18-24th 1935, he represented Austria at the 11th Conference of the International Penitentiary Commission in Berlin.

== Other interests ==
In 1941-45 he translated the surviving dramas of Aeschylus and Sophocles into German hexameters, followed by Euripides ’Iphigenia in Tauris in 1948.

He later provided unpublished translations of Shakespeare's King Lear, Antony and Cleopatra, Macbeth and Othello.

== Publications ==
- Gesundes Volksempfinden und gesetzlicher Grundgedanke. ZStW 62 (1942/44), pp. 1–27.
- Gesamelte Aufsätze, Edited by F. Nowakowski u. Th. Rittler, 1959 (W-Verz.);
- Autobiogr. in: N. Grass, Österr. Rechts- u. Staatswissenschaftler d. Gegenwart, 1952.

== Biography ==
- R. Graßberger, in: Österr. Jur. Bll., 1954, S. 353 f.;
- F. Nowakowski, ebd., 1959, S. 368 f., 1964, S. 255 f.;
- Th. Rittler, in: Österr. Juristen-Ztg., 1964, S. 225 f.
