= New Bamberg Hut =

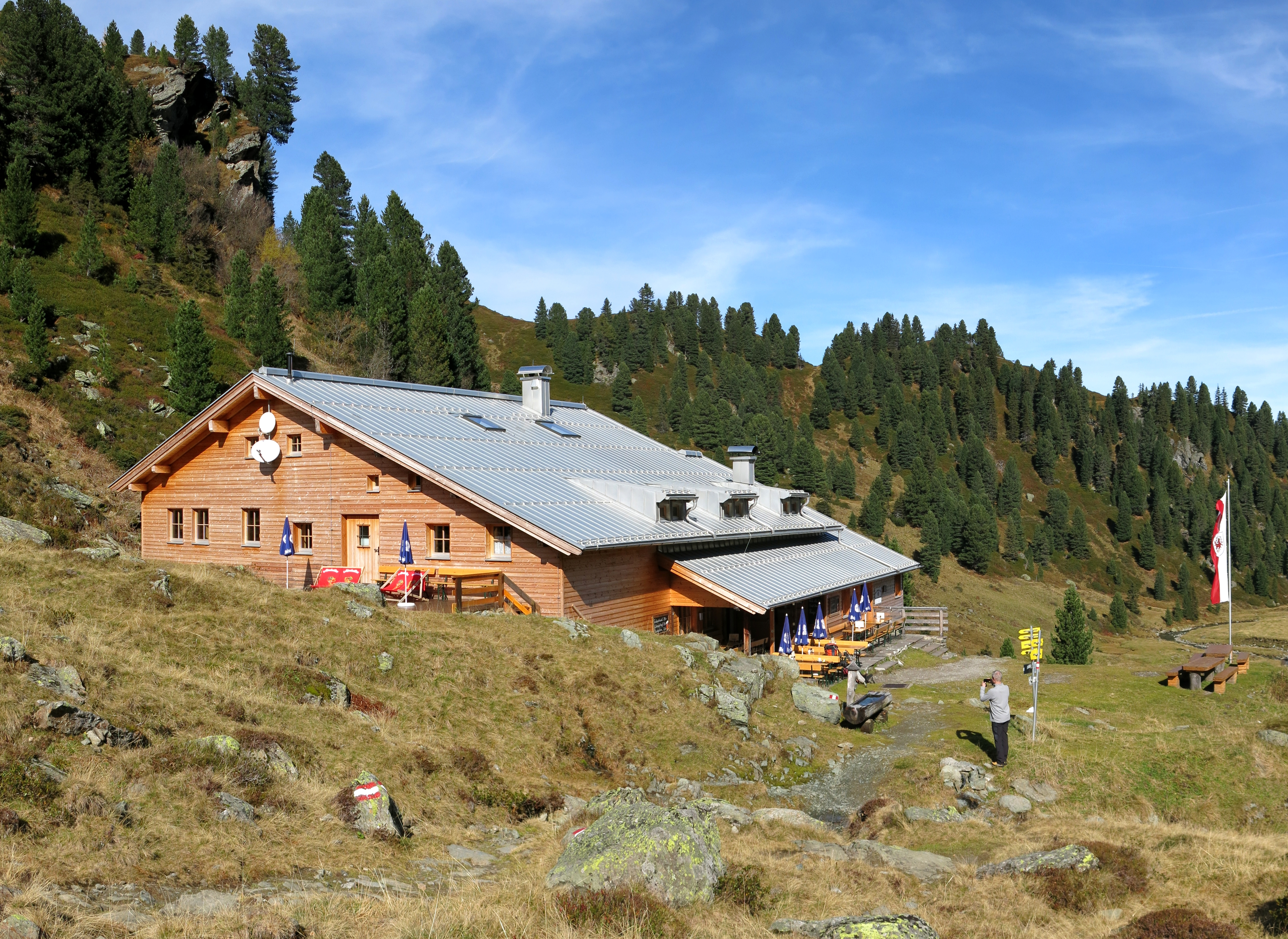
- View of the hut looking north

General information
- Location: Salzachjoch
- Coordinates: 47.30889°N 12.15056°E
- Elevation: 1,756 m (5,761 ft)
- Owner: DAV Bamberg Section

The New Bamberg Hut (German: Neue Bamberger Hütte) lies at 1,756 m AMSL in the Kelchsau in the Kitzbühel Alps in Austria and is a mountain hut owned by the German Alpine Club's Bamberg Section.

The hut may be reached either from the Kelchsau – from the Gasthof Wegscheid inn in the Kurzen Grund in just under 2 hours or from Salzburg state, from Gasthof Ronach on the old Gerlos Road over the Salzachjoch saddle in about 3½ hours.

== History ==
The first Bamberg Hut was built in 1893/94 by the Bamberg Section at the foot of Piz Boè in the Sella Group in the Dolomites. They were dispossessed of this hut in 1919 by the Treaty of Saint Germain and the hut was given to the Club Alpino Italiano's Società degli Alpinisti Tridentini Section. The latter repaired the hut which had been badly damaged in the war and ran it under the name of Boè Hut.

In 1955 the section bought the Hopfgarten Ski Hut (Hopfgartner Skihütte) from the ski club in Hopfgarten. It was in a poor constructional state and required immediate renovation work. In 1958 the hut was expanded and the kitchen, drainage, pressure pipes and drinking water pipes were refurbished. In 1960 the Hopfgarten Hut was finally renamed the New Bamberg Hut (Neue Bamberger Hütte). In 1962 the material ropeway was built. Further renovations took place in 1978, 1991 and 2000.

== Winter tour destinations ==
- Schafsiedel
- Aleitenspitze
- Schwebenkopf
- Salzachgeier
- Tristkopf
- Kröndlhorn
- Fünfmandling
- Nandernachjoch
- Markkirchl

== Summer hiking tours ==
- The Wildalmseen, 1,900 to 2,300 m
- Tristkopf, 2,359 m, ca. 2 hours
- Schafsiedel, 2,447 m, ca. 2½ hours
- Kröndlhorn, 2,444 m, ca. 2½ hours
- Salzachgeier, 2,466 m, ca. 3½ hours
