= Franz Wallack =

Austrian civil engineer (1887–1966)

Franz Friedrich Wallack (24 August 1887 – 31 October 1966) was an Austrian civil engineer. He mainly designed and built mountain pass roads, in particular the Grossglockner High Alpine Road across the High Tauern range between Salzburg and Carinthia.

== Life ==
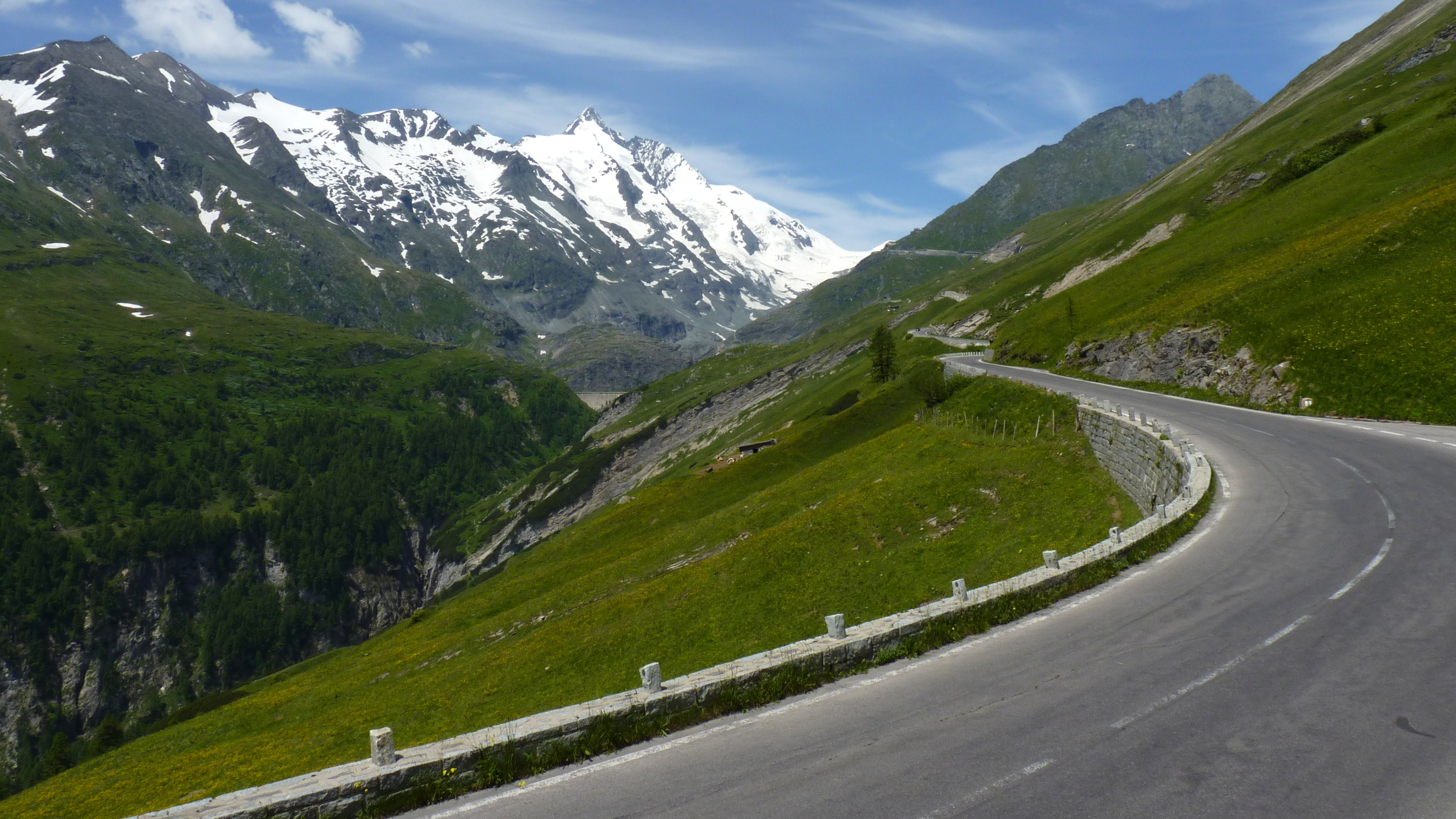
Glockner Road, view to Grossglockner massif

Born in Vienna, Wallack studied engineering sciences and began his career at the building planning authority of the Carinthian state government. In 1924 he was commissioned to draw up a general project for the construction of the Glockner Road. Wallack's technical endeavor - to build this first modern high alpine road - has long counted among the most significant historic events of this century.

Construction began in August 1930, in the midst of the Great Depression. Wallack laid out the road so that it harmoniously accommodated the landscape, giving the least possible damage to nature. On 22 September 1934 he and the Salzburg governor Franz Rehrl first travelled the Glockner Road driving a Steyr 100, about one year before the official opening.

Franz Wallack joined the board of the Großglockner High Alpine Road stock company. In the 1950s he also designed special snow thrower vehicles for the annual snow removal in spring. He became an honorary citizen of Salzburg and was awarded the Karl Renner Prize in 1952. Up to the completion of his life's work, Wallack crossed the main alpine crest more than 250 times on foot. At the age of 73, Wallack was still able to direct the new building of the Gerlos Alpine Road.

== Legacy ==
The mountain hut Wallackhaus is named in his honor.
