= Arno Trail =

Distance trail through the Austrian Alps

Arno Trail Arnoweg
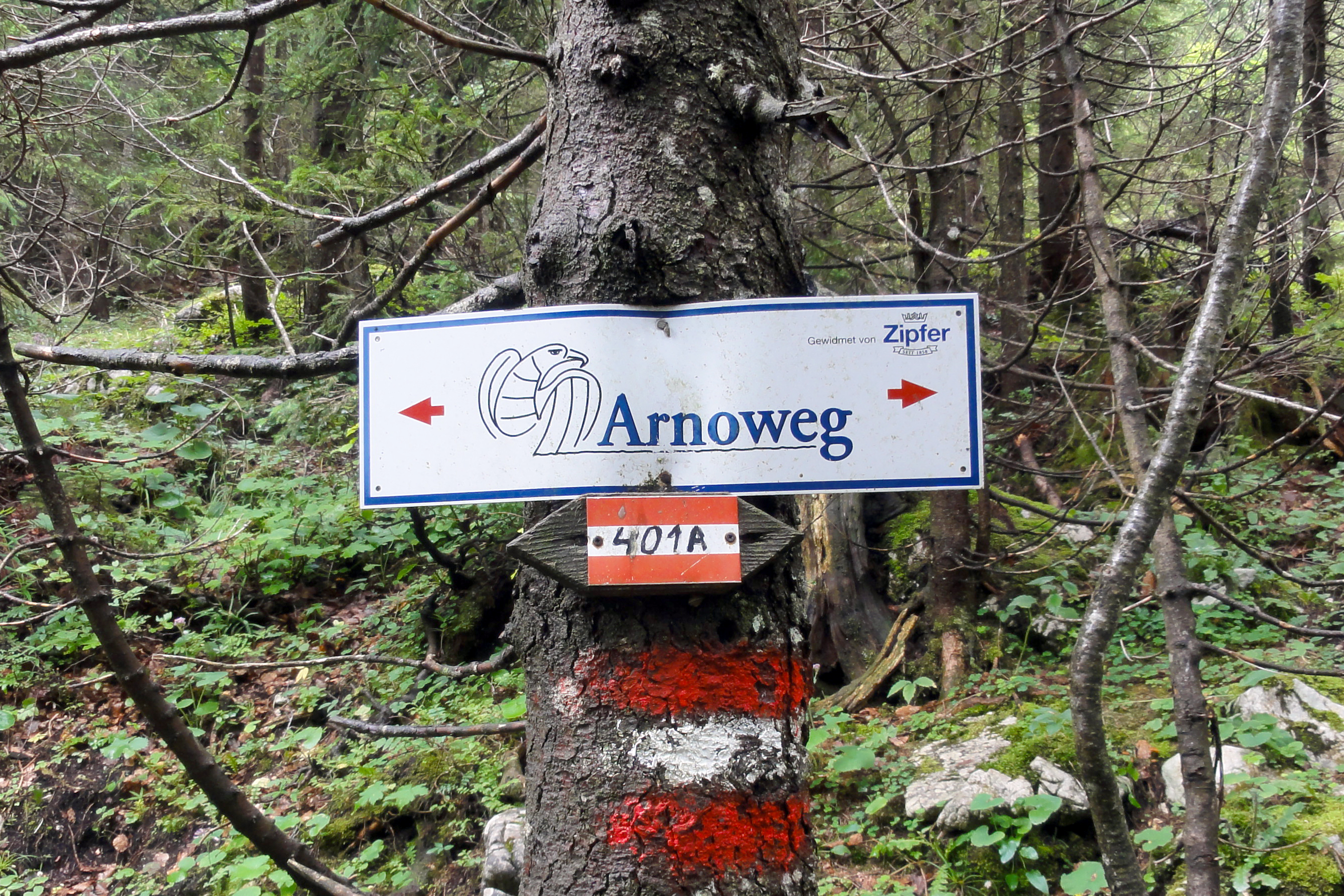
- Example of a trail marker for the Arno Trail
- Elevation: 3,106 metres (10,190 ft).

Third Approach
- Location: Austria
- Range: Alps

The Arno Trail (German: Arnoweg) is an approximately 1,200 kilometres (750 mi) long-distance trail through the Austrian Alps. The highest point is atop the Sonnblick (3,106 metres [10,190 ft]) near Bad Gastein, and in total the trail has over 57,000 metres (35 mi) of elevation gain. The highest elevations are in the western portion of the trail, in the Kalkberge, Pinzgauer Grasberge and Keesberge. The Arno Trail forms a loop which passes through such towns as Salzburg, Neukirchen, Bad Gastein and Nußdorf. It runs predominantly through Austria, although two stages pass through Germany's Berchtesgaden Alps and by the Königssee. The trail can be completed in just over 60 stages, many of which end at alpine huts run by the Austrian Alpine Club. It can be shortened by just under a week by crossing from Fuschl immediately to Salzburg in two stages and thus avoiding seven stages in the relatively low-lying foothills.

== See also ==
- List of highest paved roads in Europe
- List of mountain passes
