= Wildenburg =

Wildenburg may refer to:

- Wildenburg Castle (Hunsrück), a ruined castle near Kempfeld, Hunsrück, Rhineland-Palatinate, Germany
- Wildenburg Castle (Eifel), castle near Hellenthal, Eifel, county of Euskirchen, North Rhine-Westphalia, Germany

== See also ==
- Wildenberg (disambiguation)
- Wildburg (disambiguation)
- Wildenburger Kopf, a mountain in the Hunsrück mountains near the village of Kempfeld
