= Gerlos Pass =

Mountain pass in the Austrian Alps

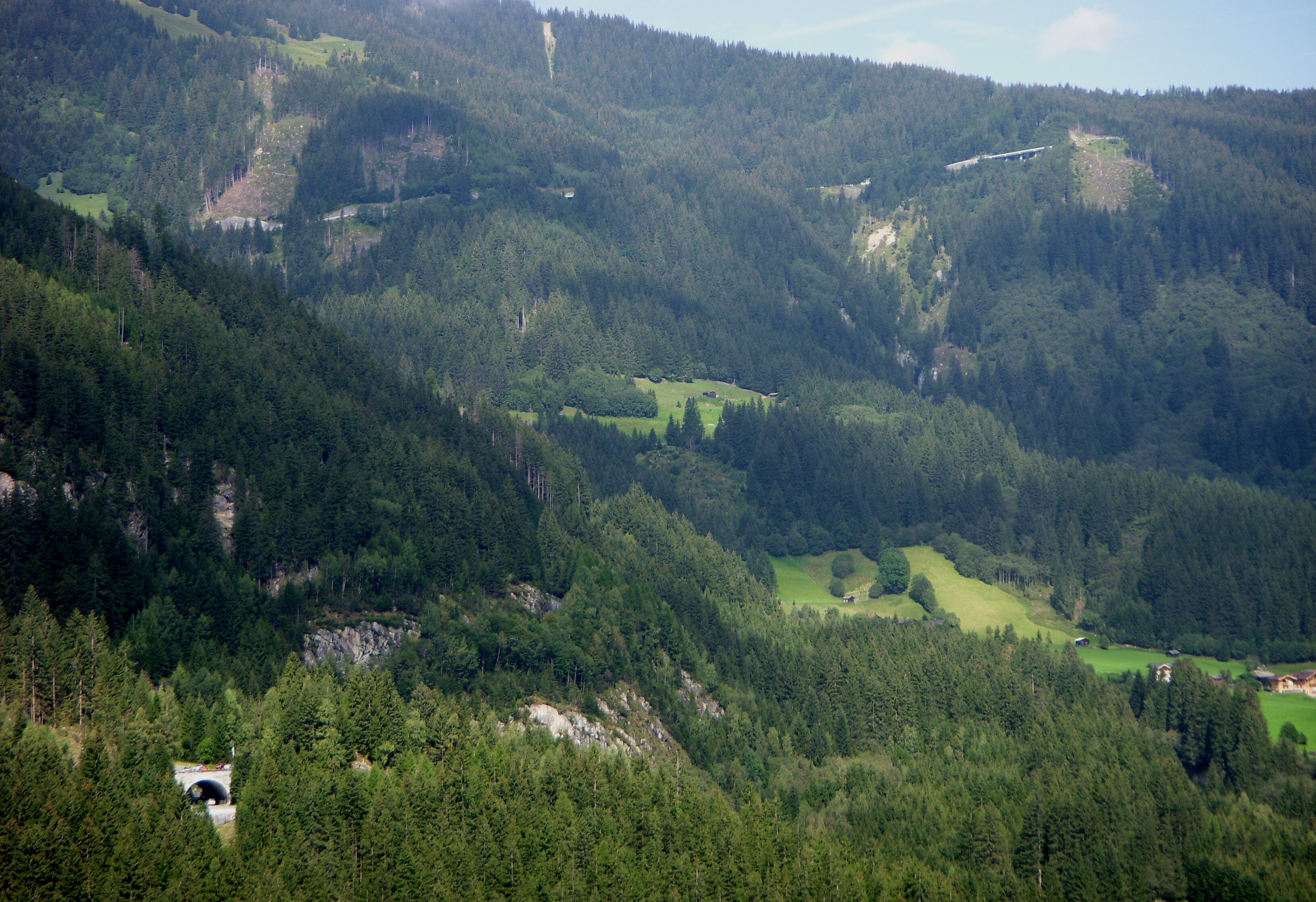

- Location within Austria
- Elevation: 1,500 metres (4,900 ft)
- Traversed by: Federal Highway B 165

Third Approach
- Location: Austria
- Range: Alps
- Coordinates: 47°14′35″N 12°6′37″E

Gerlos Pass (elevation 1,500 metres [4,921 ft]) is a mountain pass in the Austrian Alps between the Oberpinzgau region in the state of Salzburg and the Zillertal valley in Tyrol. The old road leads from Wald im Pinzgau to Gerlos in the Zillertal valley. It is closed to trucking and not always open in winter. A new toll road that is open all year was built in the 1960s from Krimml to Gerlos.

== History ==
The first road across the Gerlos Pass was built in 1630. The Gerlosstraße road via Filzsteinalm pasture and the Gerlos plain was completed in 1962. The Durlaßboden reservoir and the Tauernkraftwerke power stations are situated on the western slope.

== See also ==
- List of highest paved roads in Europe
- List of mountain passes
