= Glemmtal =

Valley in the Austrian state of Salzburg

Coordinates: 47°23′N 12°38′E

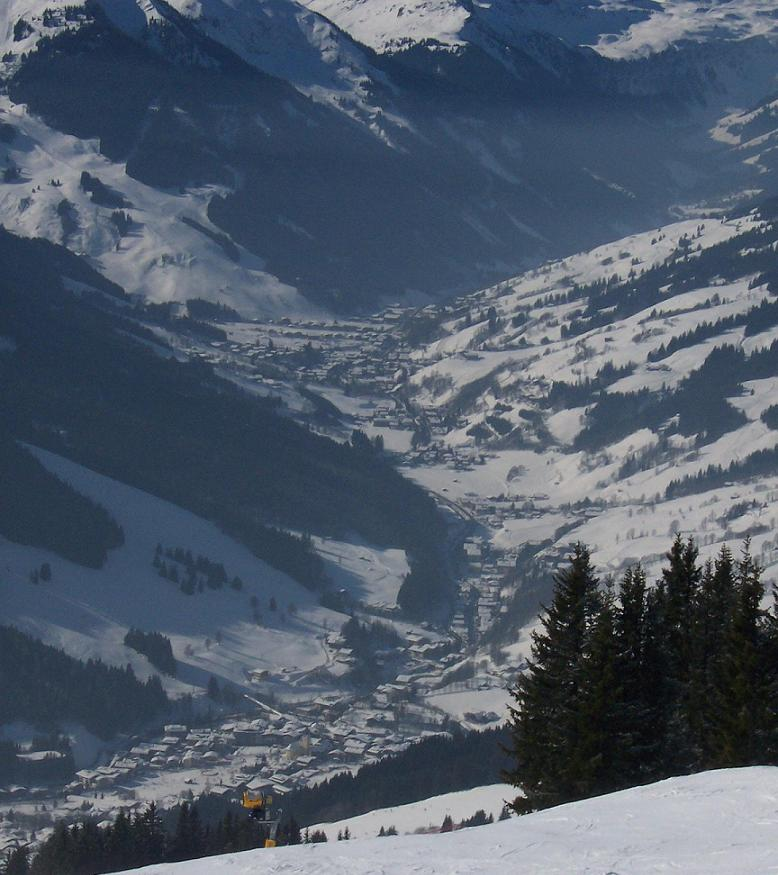
Glemmtal from the Pründelkopf, looking west, with the villages of Saalbach and Hinterglemm in the background

The Glemmtal (German pronunciation: [ˈɡlɛmtaːl], "Glemm Valley") in the Austrian state of Salzburg is the valley of the roughly 30 km long upper reaches of the River Saalach. It belongs to the northern Pinzgau region and separates the Kitzbühel Alps in an east-west direction. Its main settlement is the village of Saalbach in Zell am See district.

== Geography ==
The Saalbach flows through the upper 10 km of the valley, whose largest headstream, the Schwarzenbach, rises at about 1800 m above sea level between the Geißstein, the Tristkogel and the Spieleckkogel mountains. After uniting with several streams and the white waters of the Voglalpgraben it flows as the Saalbach through the Hinterglemm (Hinterglemm valley), from where several summer and winter routes head north leading to the Saalach Valley Ridgeway (Saalachtaler Höhenweg) and south to the Pinzgau Ridgeway (Pinzgauer Höhenweg). Near the confluence of the Schwarzachengraben lie several scattered settlements and, on the southern valley floor is the Karl Renner Haus belonging to the Friends of Nature.

Several kilometres downstream the valley broadens and one enters the well-known Saalbach-Hinterglemm ski region and the village of Saalbach, from where the Saalbach is called the "Saalach" and the valley the "Lower Glemm Valley" or Vorderglemmtal. Here the Spielbergbach joins from the north and several summer mountain trails begin here too including the one to the Schattberg. Now the valley runs for 15 km relatively straight and due east.

The valley ends near Viehhofen, north of the Zeller See, the Saalach swings north the valley broadens to several kilometres to form the Saalfelden Basin around the town of Saalfelden.

The Glemmtal was the site of prehistoric mining for copper, pyrite, and/or fahlore, near Viehhofen.

== Sports ==
- Skicircus Saalbach-Hinterglemm/Leogang, winter sports area
