= Silbergründle Pit =

Mine in Germany

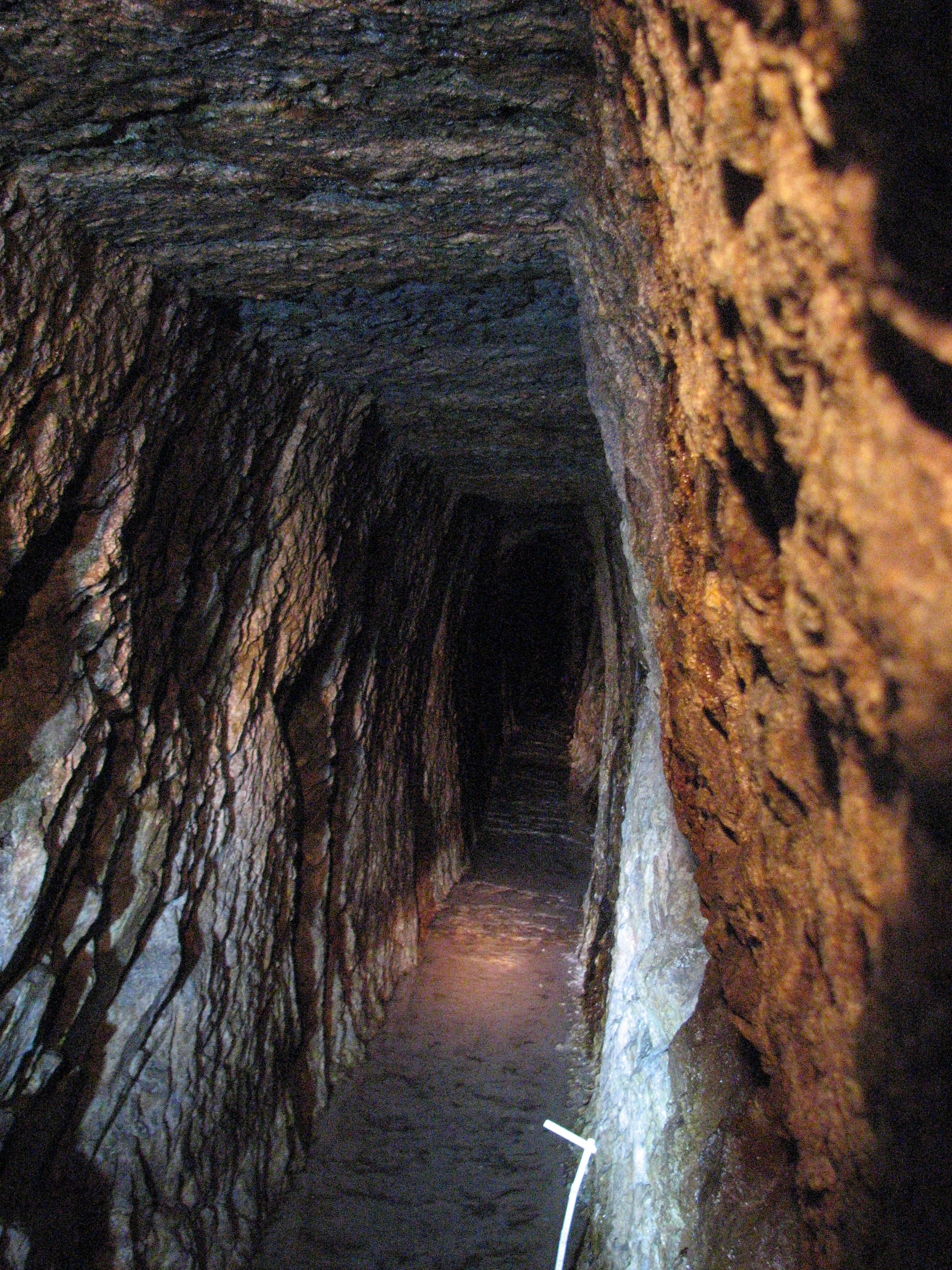

- Location within Germany
- Location: 48.580034°N 8.168031°E
- Products: silver, lead
- Opened: before 1300
- Active: Grube Silbergründle
- Closed: 1770

The Silbergründle Pit (German: Grube Silbergründle) near Seebach in the Black Forest in Germany was a lead and silver mine.

== History ==
There is clear evidence that mining began here in the 12th or 13th century and ended around the year 1770. Since 1984 the pit has been used as a show mine.

== Geology ==
The pit developed two quartz veins, of up to 1.5 metres thickness. The host rock is Seebach granite. The veins contain galena and fahlerz, as well as iron-manganese and copper-oxide.

== Show mine ==
In 1978, under the direction of the local history society, work on the Erzknappenstollen adit began. In 1984, visitors were able to enter the Erzknappenlochstollen. Between 1984 and 2005, further excavation projects made other parts of the mine accessible, so that both the Upper and Lower Adits (Obere and Untere Stollen) could be visited.

== See also ==
- List of show mines

== Literature ==
- Wolfgang Werner, Volker Dennert: Lagerstätten und Bergbau im Schwarzwald. Published by the Landesamt für Geologie, Rohstoffe und Bergbau, Baden-Württemberg, Freiburg im Breisgau, 2004, ISBN 3-00-014636-9.
