= Bürgl Hut =

Private mountain hut in the Austrian federal state of Salzburg

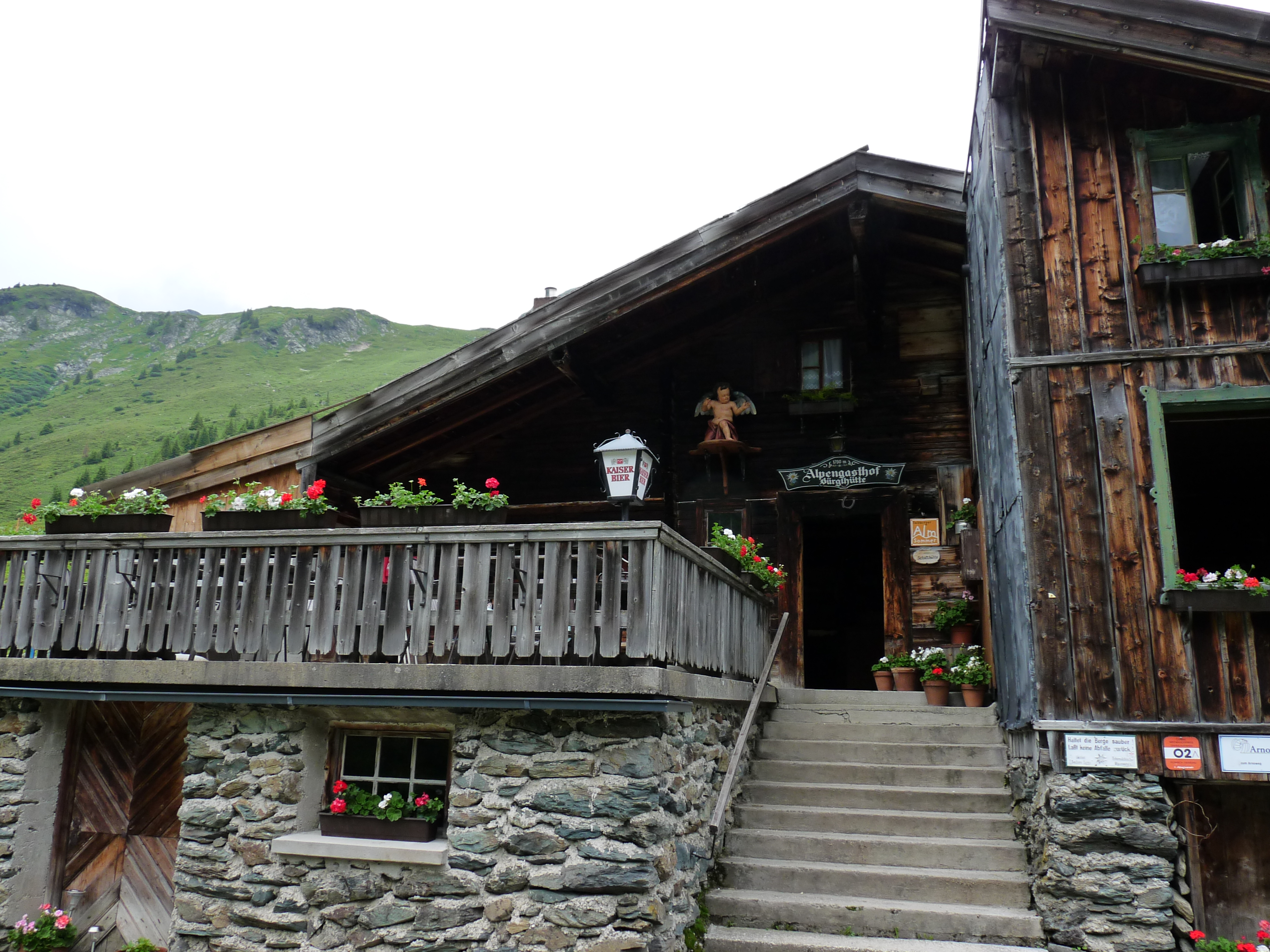
- The Bürgl Hut (July 2009)
- Interactive map of the Bürgl Hut area

General information
- Location: head of the Mühlbach valley
- Coordinates: 47°19′23.9″N 12°29′45.7″E
- Elevation: 1,699 m (5,574 ft)
- Owner: private

Website
- www.almgasthaus.de/buerglhuette

The Bürgl Hut (German: Bürglhütte) is a private mountain hut at 1,699 m (AA) in the Kitzbühel Alps in the Austrian federal state of Salzburg.

The formerly self-catering hut is today partially managed (ca. 20 beds and 25 mattress places) and is found on the southern slopes of the Geißstein (2,363 m), 5 km north of Mittersill and 7 km east of the Thurn Pass.

The Alpine hut lies at the head of the Mühlbach valley, that runs up from the Salzach valley near Uttendorf/Stuhlfelden. The climb to the hut from Stuhlfelden takes 2–3 hours, but the track to the hut is also open to bicycles or motor vehicles. The approach from Hinterglemm takes somewhat longer.

The hut is an important base for the so-called Pinzgau Ridgeway (Pinzgauer Spaziergang), a popular mountain trail. The climb from the hut to the Geißstein takes about 2 hours.

== Crossings ==
- Pinzgau Hut 6–7 hours (east)
- Wildkogelhaus 5–6 hours
- Bochumer Hut (also Kelchalpenhaus) 4 hours

== Sources, external links ==
- Freytag-Berndt "Kitzbühler Alpen" 1:100.000 and short guide
- Österr. Karte 1:50.000, Bürglhütte and Geißstein
