= Skicircus Saalbach-Hinterglemm/Leogang =

Winter sports area in the Austrian federal state of Salzburg

The Skicircus Saalbach Hinterglemm Leogang Fieberbrunn is a winter sports area in the Austrian federal state of Salzburg. It extends on both sides of the valley over the mountains of the Glemmtal and has a link to Leogang and to Fieberbrunn, in Tyrol. Because the area is laid out around the valley and the municipality of Saalbach-Hinterglemm the name "Skicircus" was chosen. A ski circus is a winter sports area that is laid out around a valley, normally enabling circuits of the whole complex.

== Region ==
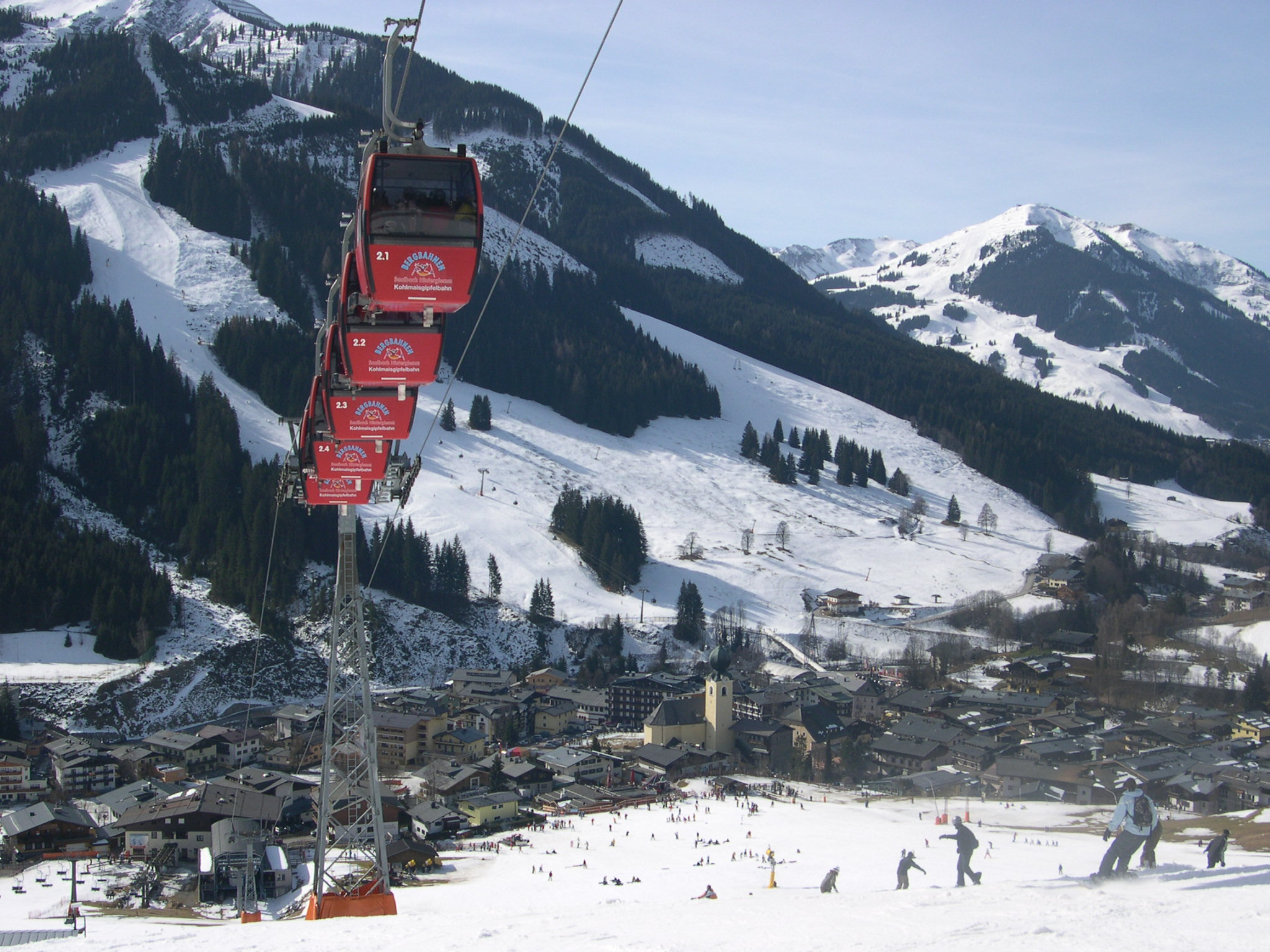
A landmark of the ski circus: The Kohlmais summit lift; in the background: Saalbach, Schattberg and Zwölferkogel

- By far the best-known part of the Skicircus Saalbach-Hinterglemm/Leogang is located below the summit of the Kohlmaiskopf on the northern side of the Glemmtal. Here the pistes are mainly of medium difficulty and include a world championship run from the 1991 World Ski Championships.
- West of Kohlmais are the Bernkogel, Reiterkogel and Hochalm. Here the runs are mainly easy or medium difficulty.
- The highest point in the ski circus is the West Summit of the Schattberg (2,096 metres) on the opposite side of the valley. The Schattberg is actually two mountains – Schattberg East and Schattberg West – and offers challenging pistes.
- The Zwölferkogel is the hardest part of the whole region. It includes the world championship route and a world cup piste.

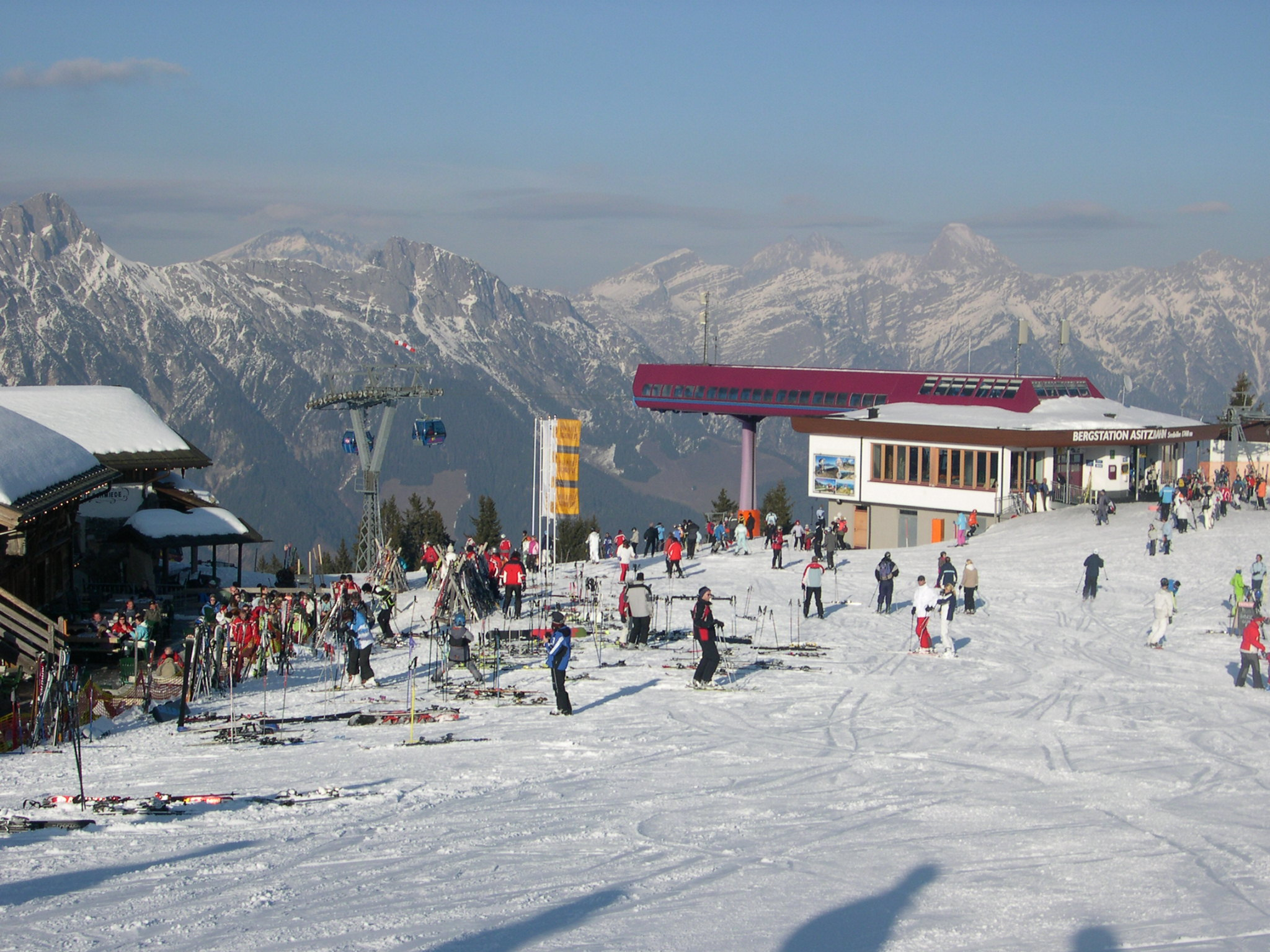
The top station of the Leogang Gondola Lift

- At Asitz in Leogang there are more easy to medium downhill runs.

=== Equipment ===
There are currently 70 lifts in the skicircus, including 18 gondola lifts, 19 chairlifts and 18 drag lifts or practice lifts. The combined carrying capacity in winter is 97,521 people per hour.

There are 270 kilometres of prepared piste, of which 140 km is rated as easy, 110 as medium and 20 as difficult.

All the main downhill runs and many secondary runs are equipped with artificial snow-making equipment. They make use of eight water storage basins, 353 snow cannon and 108 snow guns.

== Companies ==
The lifts of the ski area are operated by four different lift companies:

- Saalbacher Bergbahnen Ges.m.b.H.: Kohlmais, Schattberg, Bernkogel
- Bergbahnen Saalbach Hinterglemm Ges.m.b.H.: Reiterkogel, Schönleiten, Westgipfel, Vorderglemm, Viehhofen
- Hinterglemmer Bergbahnen Ges.m.b.H.: Zwölferkogel, Hochalm
- Leoganger Bergbahnen Ges.m.b.H.: Leogang.

== Development ==
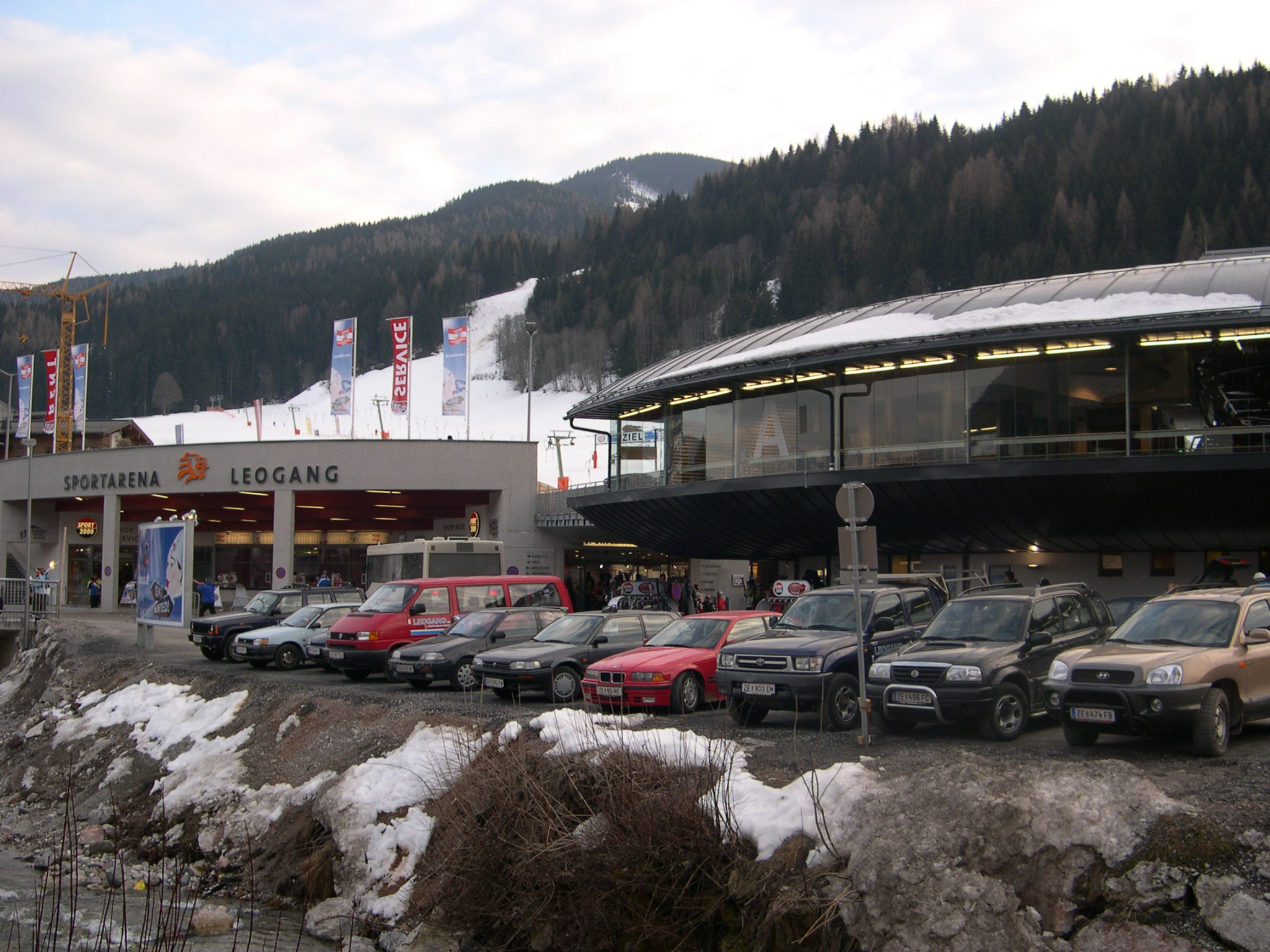
Open since winter 2006/07: the converted Leogang valley station

Following the upgrade of lift and snow-making facilities in previous years further investment was made for the 2010/11 winter season: a gondola lift replaced the former drag lift of Unterschwazach in the course of which the floodlit piste in Hinterglemm was upgraded.

The previously planned link with the Schmittenhöhe did not however come to fruition.
