= Pinzgau Ridgeway =

Ridgeway in the Kitzbühel Alps in Austria

The Pinzgau Ridgeway (German: Pinzgauer Spaziergang or Pinzgauer Höhenweg) is a roughly 25 kilometre long ridgeway in the Kitzbühel Alps in the Austrian federal state of Salzburg.

== Location and route ==
The ridgeway runs parallel to the Salzach valley at a height of around 2,000 metres along the crest that separates the high Alpine valley from the Glemmtal to the north. The entire route lies in the region known as the Pinzgau.

The mountain trail begins on the 1,965 m (AA) high Schmittenhöhe, the local mountain for the town of Zell am See, which can be reached by cable car. From there it runs westwards over the Kettingtörl (1,780 m) to the Kettingkopf (1,865 m), south of which is the Pinzgau Hut (1,700 m), an important base for the Pinzgau Ridgeway. The ridgeway continues, in places, along the crest itself, but mainly runs just below it on its southern side. Long climbs are rare, the path mainly lying between 1,800 m and 2,000 m. En route there are several refuge huts at crossings such as the 1,993 m high Klammscharte ridge or the 2,059 m high Klingertörl. A number of alpine huts (Almhütten) along the ridgeway offer overnight accommodation. Several variations of the route enable summits to be ascended, such as those of the Maurerkogel (2,074 m), the Hochkogel (2,249 m), the Bärensteigkopf (2,225 m), the Manlitzkogel (2,247 m) or the Leitenkogel (2,015 m). The route then via over the 1,699 m high Bürgl Hut through the Mühlbach valley down to Stuhlfelden in the Salzach valley.

== Character ==
The Pinzgau Ridgeway is a relatively easy and well-signed hiking trail without any major technical difficulties; only some of the variations over the summits are more challenging. There are no major differences in height to be conquered; in all the route climbs some 500 metres if the cable car to the Schmittenhöhe is taken at the beginning. Although there are several options to tackle the route over several days, experienced hikers can complete it in just one day. Usually though, walkers stop overnight at the Pinzgau Hut or the Sonnbergalm. The Pinzgau Ridgeway is part of Route 02 A, an Austrian long-distance path.

The particular attraction of this trail is its constant view of the highest summits of Austria's High Tauern and the valley of the River Salzach before them. In the western section the ridgeway has impressive views of the Zillertal Alps. The crest itself is part of the Kitzbühel Alps, whose gently, only rarely rocky slate summits, belong to the greywacke zone.

== Variations and extensions ==
The ridgeway may also be joined from the north from the Glemm valley and its western end can be accessed from the hamlet of Lengau in the municipality of Saalbach-Hinterglemm. If only half the route is walked, there is the option of ascending or descending on the cable car from Saalbach-Hinterglemm to the 2,096 m high Schattberg, about four kilometres north of the Hochkogel. In addition, there are other connecting routes from the Glemmtal, such as the one via the Streitbergalm (1,350 m). To the south, in the Salzach valley are other short cuts, for example, to Niedernsill.

The Pinzgau Ridgeway is part of the 02 A long-distance trail, a variation of the Central Alpine Way (Zentralalpenweg) from Hainburg an der Donau to Feldkirch. A section of this trail runs from the Pinzgau Ridgeway, crossing the Low and High Tauern as well as the Salzburg Slate Alps. To the west a trail continues from the Bürglhaus via the Thurn Pass (1,220 m) and the Zillertal Alps to the New Bamberg Hut.

The Pinzgau Ridgeway is also part of the Arno Way (Arnoweg), a circular trail, that runs almost around the entire state of Salzburg. It is joined in the east by another trail that crosses the Dienten Mountains, to the west the trail follows the border with Tyrol as far as the Gerlos Pass, where it swings away to the south.

== Sources ==
- Freytag-Berndt Kitzbüheler Alpen und Pinzgau. Hiking map 1:100,000 series (sheet 38) and hut guide, Geografa Vienna-Innsbruck-Munich-Bozen.
- Salzburg Süd. Leisure map, Österreich 1:100,000 sheet 9 (of 13), Hofer AG, Vienna 2005
- Austrian map series 1;50,000 (sheets 121–125) and 1:200,000 (sheets 47/12 and 47/13); map section see AustrianMap Salzburg
- Wanderführer Kitzbühler Alpen (Sbg.~1980)
- R. Oberhauser (ed.): Der geologische Aufbau Österreichs, chapter 3.6.5, 3.6.6 und 3.13. Geologische Bundesanstalt Vienna / Springer-Verlag Vienna/ New York 1980
