= Bochumer Hut =

Alpine club hut in the Austrian state of Tyrol

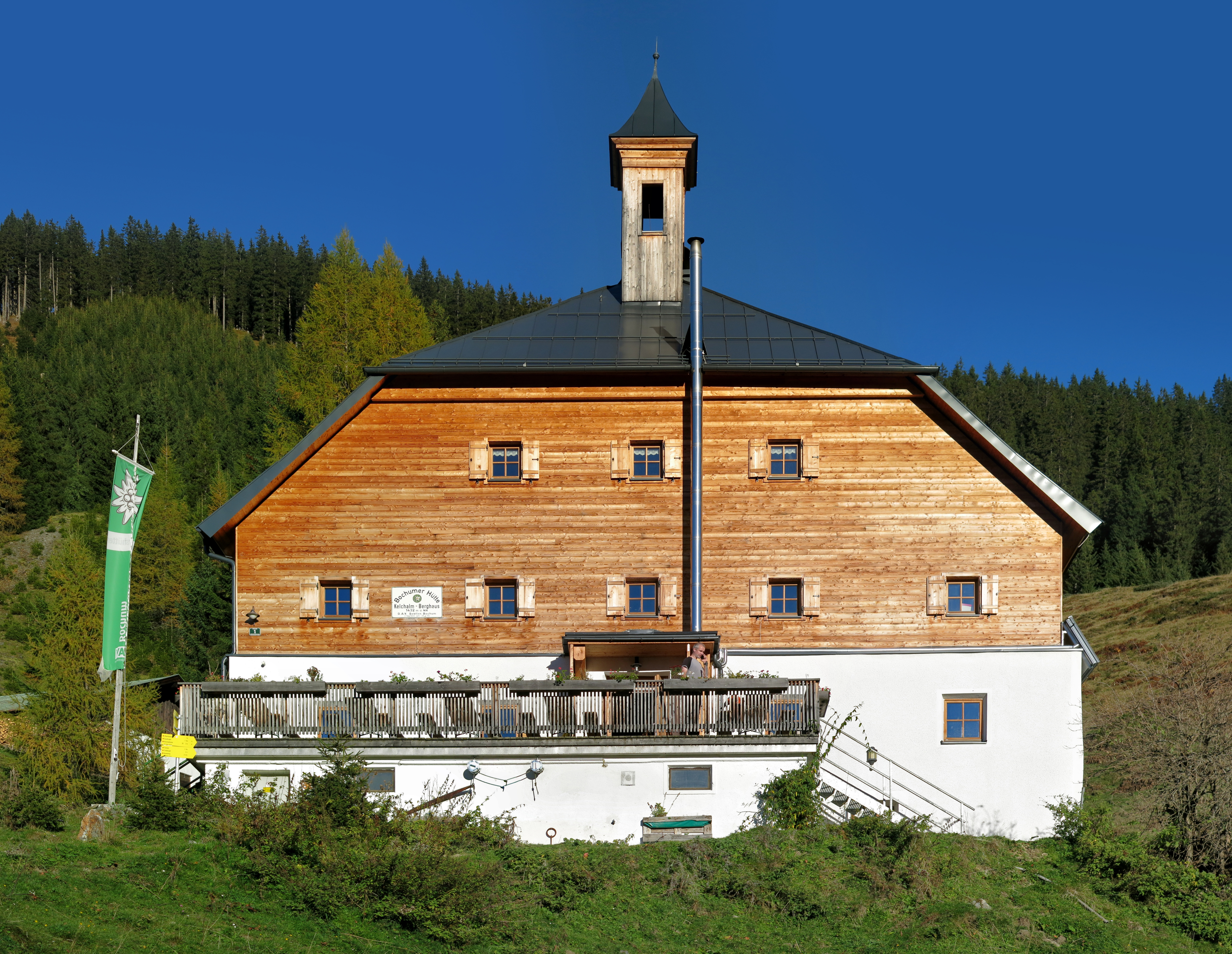
- front view
- Interactive map of the Bochumer Hut area

General information
- Coordinates: 47.386528°N 12.464639°E
- Elevation: 1,432 m (4,698 ft)
- Year built: 1832
- Owner: German Alpine Club, Bochum Section

Website
- www.bochumerhuette.eu/Willkommen.html

The Bochumer Hut (German: Bochumer Hütte, 1,432 m above sea level (AA)), also called Kelchalm or Kelchalpe, is an Alpine club hut in the Kitzbühel Alps in the Austrian state of Tyrol. It is owned by the Bochum Section of the German Alpine Club. Today the hut is a popular destination for hikers and also has overnight accommodation.

== History ==
The hut was built in 1832 as accommodation for miners in the copper mining industry. Following the closure of the mine in 1926 the house was rented to the Kitzbühel Alpine Club section and opened in 1928 as a proper Alpine club hut. In 1939 the hut was purchased by the German Alpine Club section in Magdeburg. After the Second World War the Magdeburg Section was dispossessed and the Kitzbühel Section took over the management of the hut. On 30 March 1964 the Bochum Section took over the Alpine club hut and the Kelchalm was given the name Bochumer Hütte.

=== Prehistoric discovery ===
At the end of the 19th century traces of a Bronze Age copper mine were found by the prehistorian, Matthäus Much, in the area of the Kelchalpe. During subsequent excavations from the 1930s to 1950s further discoveries were made that are displayed in Kitzbühel's town museum.

== Approaches ==
- Aurach bei Kitzbühel; duration: 1½ hours

== Summit tours ==
- Laubkogel (1,760 m); duration: 1 hour
- Rauber (1,973 m); duration: 1½ hours
- Tristkogel (2,095 m); duration: 2 hours
- Staffkogel (2,115 m); duration: 3 hours
- Geißstein (2,363 m); duration: 4 hours
