= Pinzgau Hut =

Building in Salzburg, Austria

- Interactive map of the Pinzgau Hut area

General information
- Location: south of the Kessel wind gap (Kesselscharte)
- Coordinates: 47.322847°N 12.7191°E
- Elevation: 1,700 m (5,600 ft)

Website
- www.sbg.at/pinzgauer-huette

The Pinzgau Hut or Pinzgauer Hut (German: Pinzgauer Hütte) is a mountain hut at 1,700 m (5,577 ft) above sea level in the Kitzbühel Alps in Salzburg, Austria.

== Location ==
The hut stands west of the Zellersee and Zell am See's local mountain, the Schmittenhöhe (1,965 m), below the Hahnkopf. The hut lies in a large forest clearing just south of the Kessel wind gap (Kesselscharte) on the eastern section of the Pinzgau Ridgeway (Pinzgauer Spaziergang) on long-distance trail 02A, only 1½ km as the crow flies from the summit of the Schmittenhöhe and its upper cable car station.

== Description ==
The Pinzgau Hut is managed by the Austrian Friends of Nature and has 46 places: 6 twin and 5 four-bed rooms and 14 mattress spaces. It is open from the beginning of June to mid-October; and in winter from Christmas to mid-April.

== Approaches ==
- In summer, from Piesendorf in two hours; from the Schmittenhöhe cable car in half an hour
  - Crossing to the Bürgl Hut six–seven hours
- In winter, on touring skis, two hours
  - From Zell am See/Schüttdorf over the Areitbahn, ski downhill to the valley station of the Kapellenbahn, then one km

== Summits ==
- Maurerkogel (2,074 m) 1½ hours
- Gernkogel (2,175 m) 2½ hours.
