= Saalach Valley Ridgeway =

Ridgeway trail in the Kitzbühel Alps in Switzerland

The Saalach Valley Ridgeway (German: Saalachtaler Höhenweg) is a roughly five-hour long ridgeway trail in the Salzburg part of the Kitzbühel Alps between Leogang and Saalfelden.

The way runs along the mountain chain that separates the valley of the Glemmtal in the south from the Leoganger Tal in the north.

The marked trail runs from the Asitz Hut near the top station of the Asitzbahn (1,752 m) south of Leogang in a southwestern direction to the 1,914 m high Asitzkopf. It then continues over the 188 m high Schabergkogel and the 1,853 m Geierkogel eastwards to the 1,875 m high Haiderbergkogel. Crossing the 1,764 m high Durchenkopf, the 1,616 m high Weikersbacherköpfl, the 1,541 m high Weikersbacher Kopf and the Biberg it carries on to the top station of the Huggenbergalm above Saalfelden. From here the journey to the valley may be made using the cable car or the sommerrodelbahn.

A variation of the route starts at the summit station of the Kohlmaisbahn on the Kohlmaiskopf (1,794 m) above Saalbach and runs over the 1,910 m high Wildenkarkogel to the Asitzkopf. This variation takes about an hour longer and is more challenging.
