= Geißstein =

Mountain in the Kitzbühel Alps in Austria

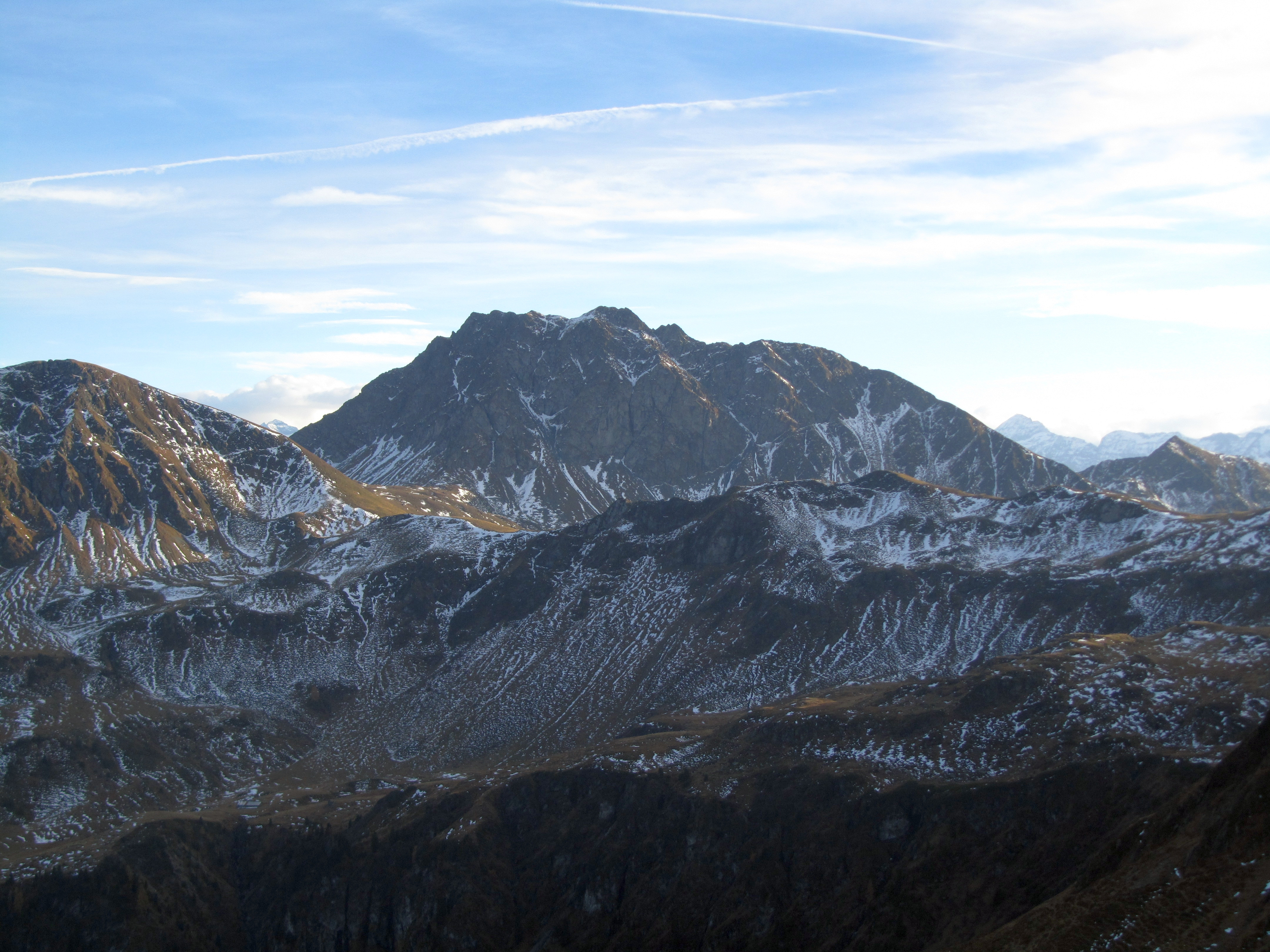
- The Geißstein from the north

Highest point
- Elevation: 2,366 m (AA) (7,762 ft)
- Coordinates: 47°20′15″N 12°29′42″E

Geography
- Location within Austria
- Location: Salzburg/Tyrol, Austria
- Parent range: Kitzbühel Alps

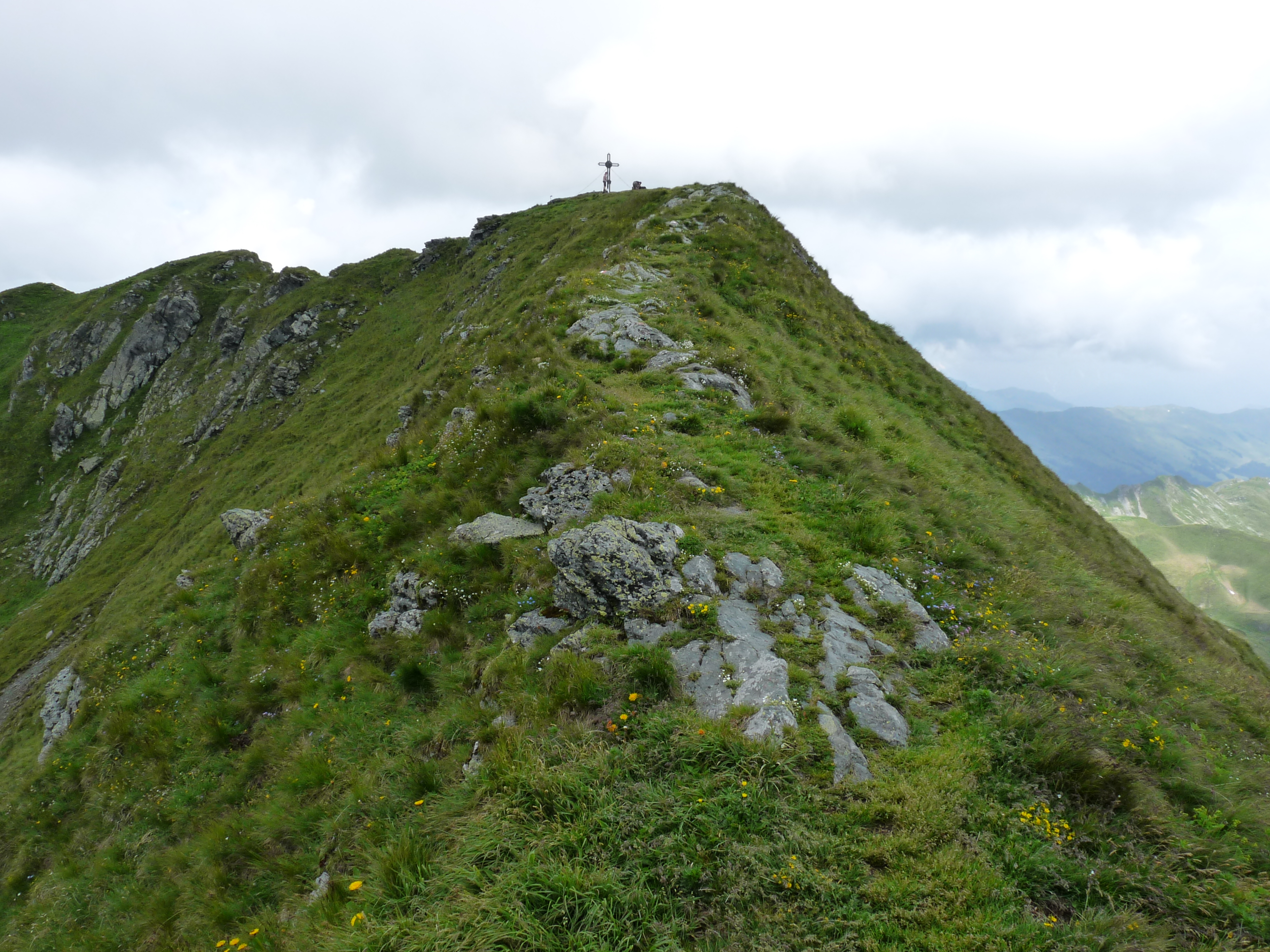
The south arête looking towards the summit cross

The Geißstein, sometimes also called the Gaisstein, is a mountain in the Kitzbühel Alps with a height of 2,366 m (AA) that straddles the border between the federal Austrian states of Tyrol and Salzburg.

The Geißstein lies about seven kilometres southeast of Jochberg. To the east of it is the Vogelalmgraben, a right-hand side valley of the Glemmtal. To the southeast is the Mühltal, a left-hand valley of the Upper Pinzgau (Oberpinzgau). This is the site of the 1,699 m high Bürgl Hut, one of the most important bases for climbing the mountain. A signposted trail runs from the hut along the southern arête to the summit. Alternatively the Geißstein can be approached from the 2,035 m high Sintersbach wind-gap (Sintersbachscharte) to the southwest over the relatively gently sloping, grassy southwest side of the mountain. Another signed trail runs through the much steeper southeastern flank which is accessible from the Vogelalmgraben or from the 2,048 m high Schlaberstatt crossing to the north.

The Geißstein may also be climbed in winter as part of a ski tour using the southwestern route from the Bürgl Hut.

According to legend, gold was supposed to have once been mined on the Geißstein and Venetians or Venediger - a German term for foreign mineral prospectors - were supposed to have been here. In addition, festivals were supposed to have been celebrated On the Schlaberstatt at which even the Devil was to be found amongst the musicians.

== Gallery ==
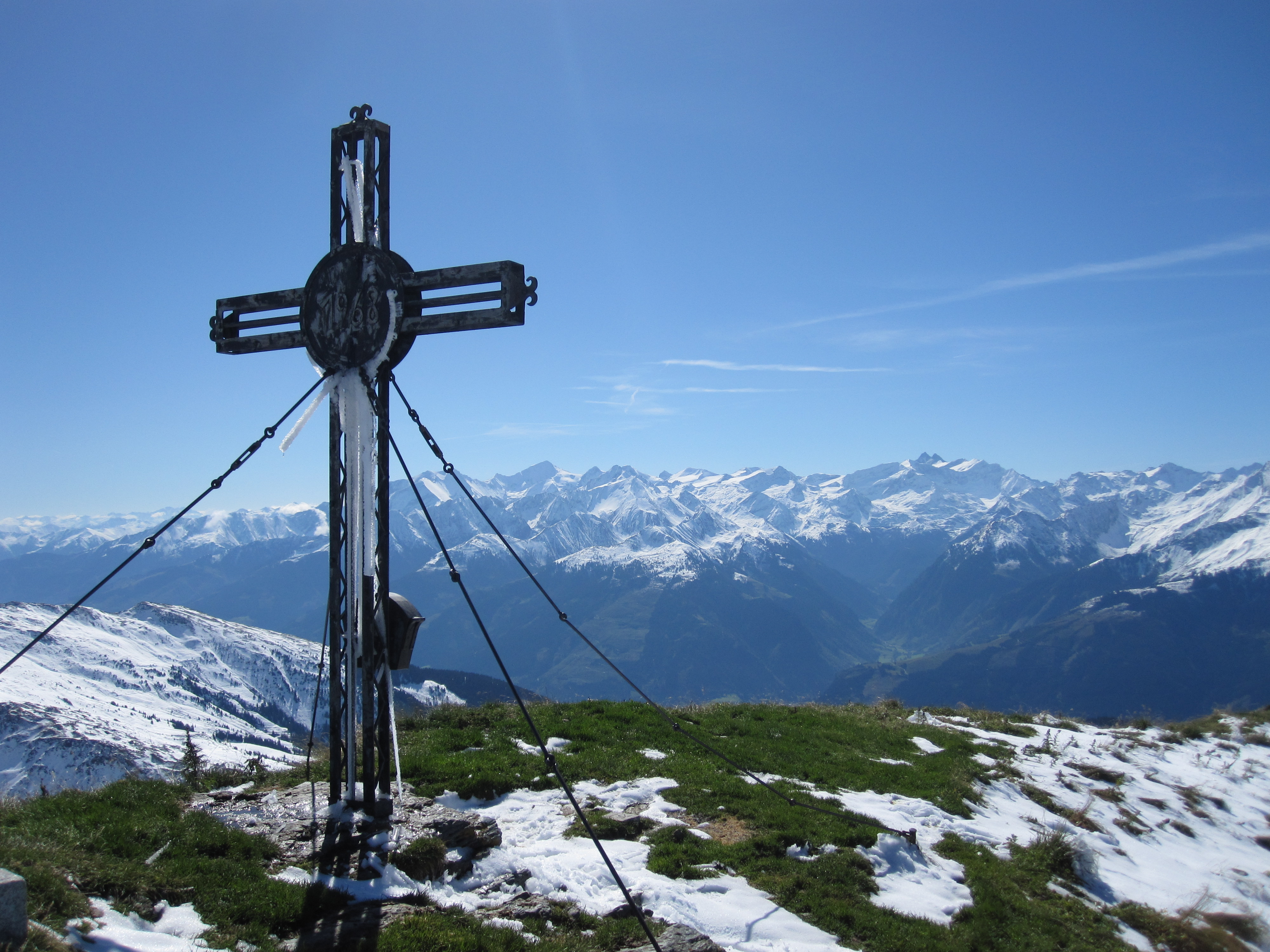
View from the Geißstein looking south over the Salzach valley to the High Tauern.
