= Karl Renner Haus =

Sport hotel in Austria

Coordinates: 47°22′22″N 12°35′36″E

The Karl Renner Haus is a former mountain hut, now a sport hotel, in the Kitzbühel Alps in Austria. It is managed by the Friends of Nature.

== History ==
The Karl Renner Haus is named after the former Austrian politician and co-founder of the Friends of Nature, Karl Renner. It was financed from membership fees, ERP credits and a mountain hut lottery and opened on 15 August 1952. In the period of economic boom in the 1950s and 60s the Karl Renner Haus was a much sought-after holiday destination, but suffered from 1985 onwards because it had no access for motor vehicles due to the absence of the necessary repairs. This finally led to a new building being put up in 2006/07 and the Karl Renner Haus was opened again on 12 October 2008 as a sport hotel by the Friends of Nature.

== Description ==
The hut lies in the upper Saalach valley (Land Salzburg) on the edge of Saalbach-Hinterglemm at about 1,100 m (3,600 ft) above sea level and is managed by the Friends of Nature.
