= Schattberg (Saalbach-Hinterglemm) =

Mountain in the Austrian state of Salzburg

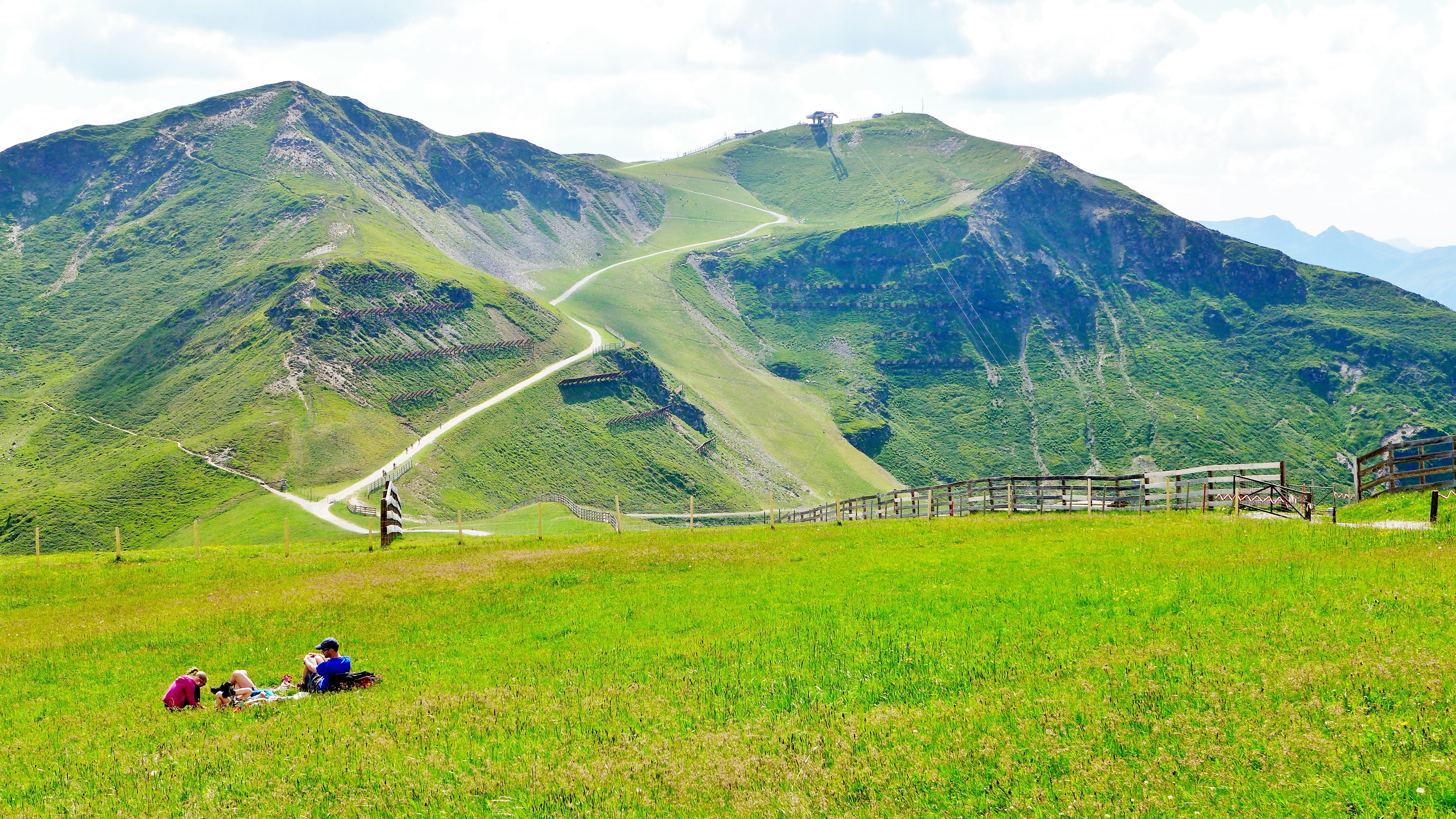
- View from Schattberg Ost towards the Mittelgipfel (left) and Schattberg West (right).

Highest point
- Elevation: 2,097 m (AA) (6,880 ft)
- Coordinates: 47°21′46″N 12°37′39″E

Geography
- Location within Austria
- Location: Salzburg
- Parent range: Kitzbühel Alps

Climbing
- Normal route: signposted hiking trail

The Schattberg is a 2,097 m (AA) high mountain in the Kitzbühel Alps in the Austrian state of Salzburg.

== Location and surrounding area ==
The Schattberg is the local mountain for the Pinzgau parish of Saalbach-Hinterglemm, that lies about 3 kilometres to the north. It forms the end of a mountain ridge that runs from the 2,249 m high Hochkogel over the 2,092 m high Saalbachkogel and the 2,123 m high Stemmerkogel to the north. To the west is the Schwarzachgraben stream, to the east the valley of the Löhnersbach which descends into the Glemmtal. The mountain has three peaks: the West Schattberg (Schattberg West) 2,096 m, the Middle Schattberg (Mittelgipfel) 2,097 m and the East Schattberg (Schattberg-Ost) 2,018 m, which is northeast of the Dillinger Eck (1,875 m).

== Access ==
The West and East Schattberg are accessible on ski lifts from Hinterglemm and Saalbach that form part of the Saalbach-Hinterglemm-Leogang ski region. Before the Schattberg X-Press cableway was erected in 2003, the Schattberg Cable Car (Schattbergbahn), built in 1960, ran from Saalbach to the summit. This cable car was, after its upgrade in 1973, the largest of its type in Austria, capable of transporting 100 people per cabin, and having the strongest standing cable (63 mm) in the world.

Around the mountain are several alm huts. The area is accessible on numerous hiking trails. Signposted ascents run from the northwest and northeast to the main peak, the Middle Schattberg. Gravelled tracks run up to the west and east peaks that are popular with mountain bikers. A signed climbing path runs to the south as well as a ski route to the Pinzgau Ridgeway, a popular mountain trail.
