= Fahlore =

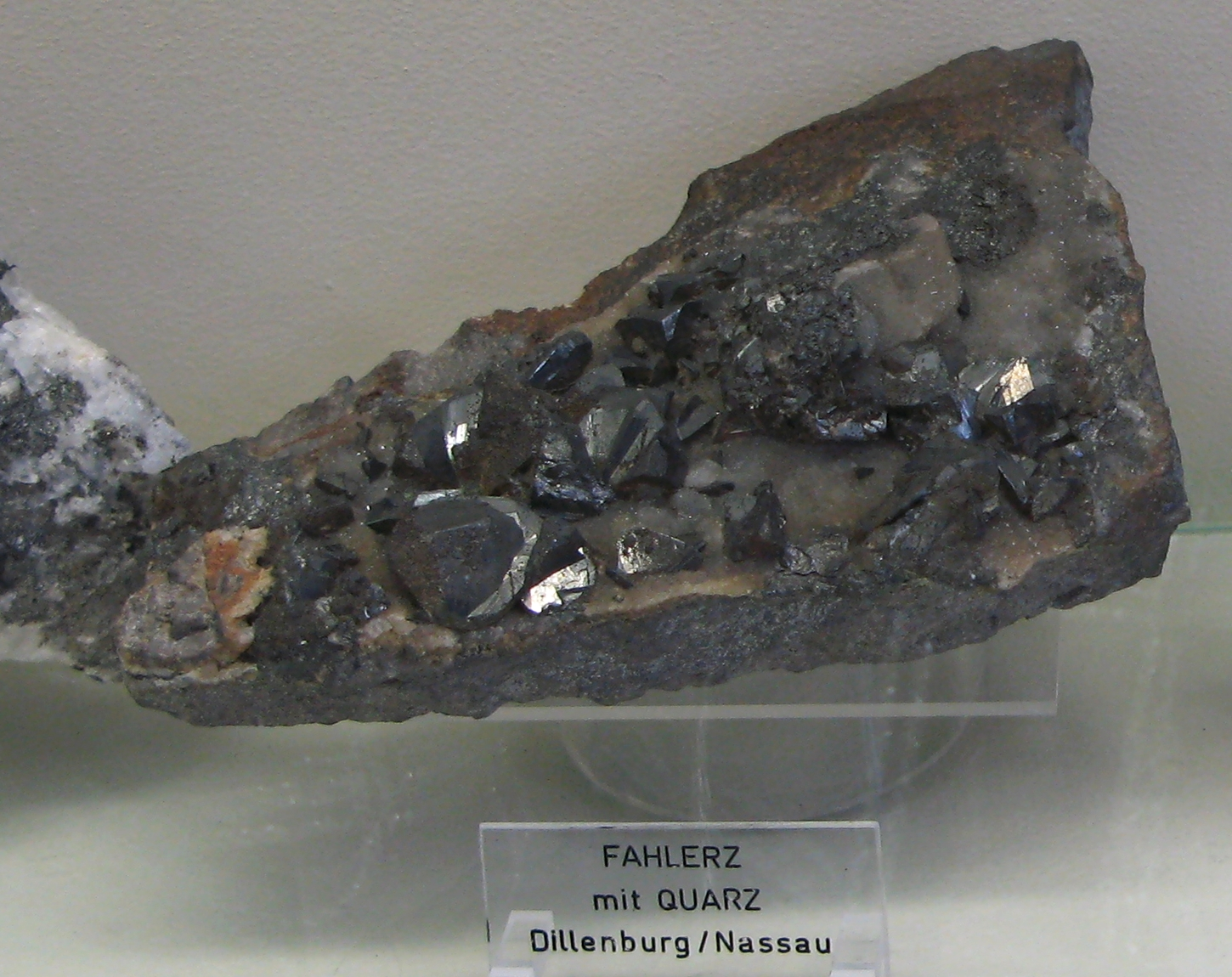
Fahlore with quartz from Dillenburg, Nassau, Germany. This piece is from the Mineralogical Museum of the University of Bonn, Germany.

Fahlore, or Fahlerz, refers to an ore consisting of complex sulfosalts, mostly the series between tennantite (Cu_{6}[Cu_{4}(Fe,Zn)_{2}]As_{4}S_{13} and tetrahedrite (Cu_{6}[Cu_{4}(Fe,Zn)_{2}]Sb_{4}S_{13}. It comes from the German word for pale, fahl. This refers to the characteristic pale grey to dark black colour.
