= List of power stations in Austria =

The following page lists all power stations in Austria. For generation of traction current, see List of installations for 15 kV AC railway electrification in Germany, Austria and Switzerland. For that of Mariazeller Bahn, see Mariazeller Bahn#Power Supply.

== Thermal ==
=== Fossil ===
Station	Location	Geographical coordinates	Capacity (MW)	Status	Refs
Simmering Power Station	Vienna	48.1810139°N 16.4349694°E	1125		
Mellach Power Station	Fernitz-Mellach	46.9090868°N 15.4915468°E	1084		
Theiss Power Station	Gedersdorf	48.3936111°N 15.7091667°E	775		
Timelkam Power Station	Timelkam	48.0122°N 13.5895°E	405		
Donaustadt Power Station	Vienna	48.1984417°N 16.4628111°E	388		
Dürnrohr Power Station	Zwentendorf-Dürnrohr	48.322222°N 15.920556°E	352	since 2019 only natural gas using also the steam of the Dürnrohr Waste power station	
Voitsberg Power Station	Voitsberg	47.0513889°N 15.1333333°E	330	closed 2012	
Mellach Power Station	Fernitz-Mellach	46.9107574°N 15.489006°E	246	since 2020 only natural gas	
Linz-Mitte Power Station	Linz	48.2997778°N 14.3235139°E	217		
Riedersbach Power Station	Riedersbach	48.0317694°N 12.8431222°E	176	closed 2016	
Neudorf Steam Power Station	Neudorf ob Wildon	46.9084278°N 15.4828417°E	164	closed 2014	
Korneuburg Power Station	Korneuburg	48.3319278°N 16.3397944°E	154		
Spittelau Power Station	Vienna	48.2345806°N 16.3593917°E	60		
Chimney of Peisching Heating Power Plant	Neunkirchen	47.7255472°N 16.1061833°E			

=== Nuclear ===
Station	Location	Geographical coordinates	Capacity (MW)	Status	Refs
Zwentendorf Nuclear Power Plant	Zwentendorf	48.354444°N 15.884722°E	692 MW	Completed but never in operation	

== Renewable ==
=== Biomass ===
Station	Location	Coordinates	Electric capacity (MW)	District heat capacity (MW)	Year
Kraftwerk Simmering Biomasse	Vienna		16	37,0	
Biomassekraftwerk Timelkam	Timelkam		8	15,0	
Biomassekraftwerk Neudörfl	Neudörfl		8	25,0	2006 -
Biomasseheizkraftwerk Kufstein	Kufstein		6,5	16	
Biomasseheizkraftwerk Steyr	Steyr	48.062809°N 14.457407°E	5,7	20,0	2012 -
Biomasseheizkraftwerk Mödling	Mödling		5,0	15,0	2006 -
Biomasseheizkraftwerk Baden	Baden bei Wien	47.99242°N 16.261525°E	5,0	15,0	2006 -
Kraft-Wärme-Kopplung Längenfeld	Längenfeld		1,1	11,7	

=== Hydroelectric ===
Station	Location	Coordinates	Capacity (MW)	Refs
Häusling (Zillergründl) Power Plant	Mayrhofen	47°08′46″N 11°58′02″E	360	
Kops II Pumped-storage Hydroelectric Power Station	Gaschurn	46.975278°N 10.044722°E	450	
Abwinden-Asten Run-of-River Power Plant	Abwinden		168	
Melk Run-of-River Power Plant	Melk	48.1330°N 15.1813°E	187	
Greifenstein Run-of-River Power Plant	Greifenstein	48.2114°N 16.1433°E	293	
Kraftwerksgruppe Fragant Pumped-storage Hydroelectric Power Station	Ausserfragant		178	
Malta-Reisseck Power Plant Group	Carinthia	46°52′14″N 13°19′46″E	1,026	
Rodundwerk II Pumped-storage Hydroelectric Power Station	Vandans	47.0845776°N 9.8746437°E	276	
Kraftwerk Kaunertal	Kaunertal		325 - 392	
Kraftwerk Imst Run-of-the-river Power Plant	Imst		89	
Kraftwerksgruppe Sellrain-Silz	Kühtai		781	
Achenseekraftwerk	Jenbach		79	
Kraftwerk Kirchbichl Run-of-the-river Power Plant	Kirchbichl		25	
Kraftwerk Langkampfen Run-of-the-river Power Plant	Langkampfen		32	
Amlach power station	Amlach		60	
Freudenau	Vienna		172	

== See also ==
- List of power stations in Europe
- List of largest power stations in the world
