= Gerlos =

- Municipality
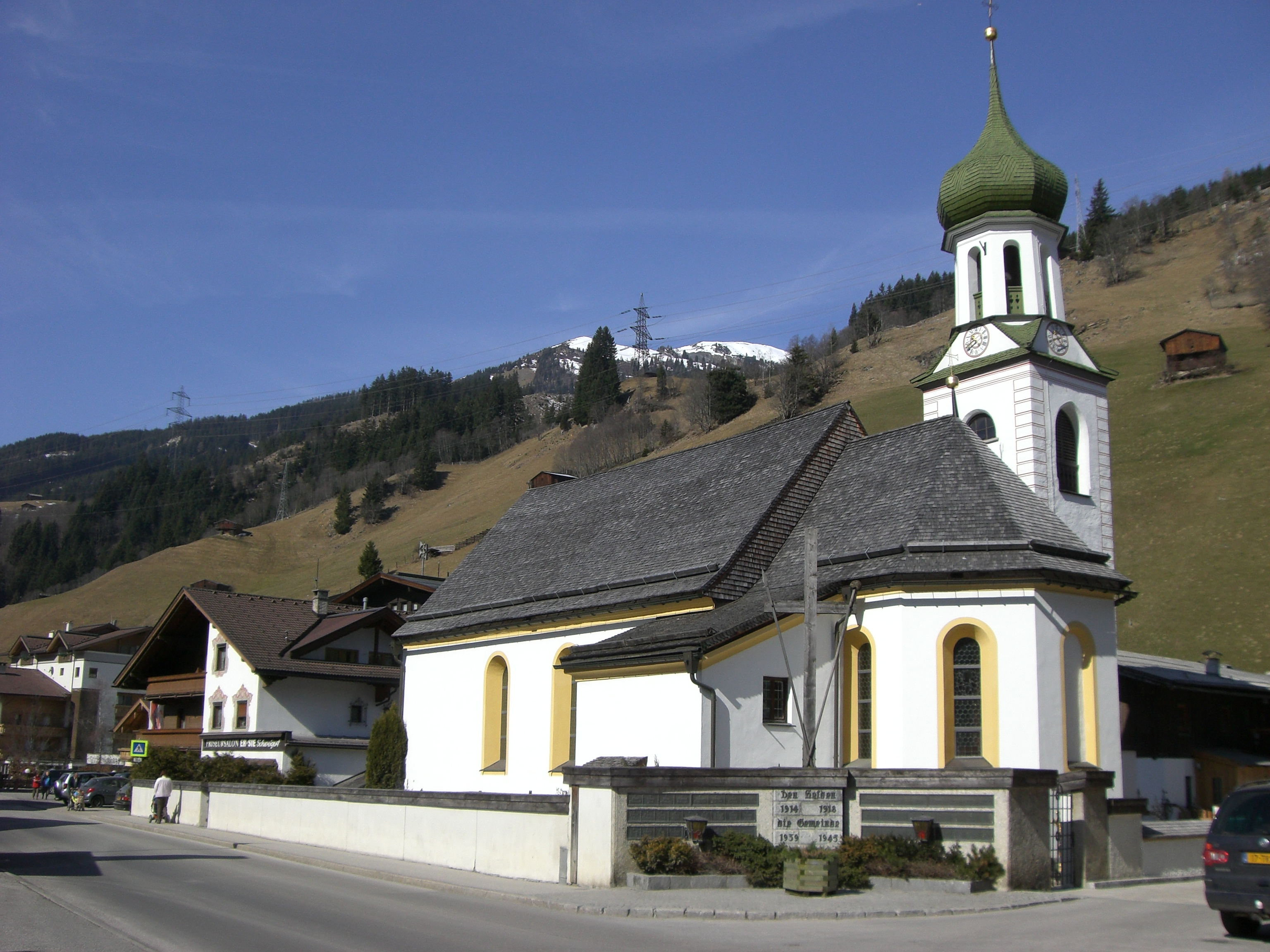

- Coat of arms

- Location within Austria
- Coordinates: 47°13′00″N 12°00′00″E
- Country: Austria
- State: Tyrol
- District: Schwaz

Government
  - Mayor: Franz Hörl (ÖVP)

Area
  - Total: 118.91 km^{2} (45.91 sq mi)
- Elevation: 1,247 m (4,091 ft)

Population (2021)
  - Total: 805
  - Density: 6.77/km^{2} (17.5/sq mi)
- Time zone: UTC+1 (CET)
  - Summer (DST): UTC+2 (CEST)
- Postal code: 6281
- Area code: 05284
- Vehicle registration: SZ
- Website: www.gerlos.tirol.gv.at

Gerlos is a municipality with 793 inhabitants (as of Jan. 2019) in Schwaz district of the Austrian state of Tyrol. The village is popular with skiing tourists, mainly families, as there is easy access to Zillertal Arena Centre on Isskogel. The village lies in the Zell am Ziller judicial district.

The municipality of Gerlos has seven districts: Au, Gmünd, Innertal, Mitterhof, Oberhof, Ried and Schwarzach.

== Geography ==
Gerlos is located in the de:Gerlostal, which is a side valley of the Zillertal, branching to the east near Zell am Ziller. Gerlos consists of several hamlets located along the Gerlos Pass on the floor of the valley, at an altitude of around 1200m. To the south, the side valleys of de:Schwarzach, de:Wimmerbach, and de:Schönach lead to the Zillertal Alps, which are over 3000 meters tall. To the north, there is a ski area on the Kitzbuhel Alps.

The municipal area of Gerlos has an area of approximately 120 km^{2}. A third of this is forested, a quarter is High Alpine, and the rest are alpine pastures. Three percent of the area is used for agriculture.

== History ==
In the 9th century, the Archbishop of Salzburg acquired large estates in the Zillertal, and the only direct connection between Salzburg and its Tyrolean territories was a mule track. In the 14th century, several tax-paying Schwaighöfe (livestock and dairy producing farms) were established in Gmünd, Ried, and Oberhof.

Until the erection of a Gothic filial church in 1470, Gerlos was part of the parish of Zell am Ziller. St Lambert's tower and Leonhard church were built circa 1500. The parish church in Gerlos today still contains its substructure, up to the octagonal attachment. The other parts of Gerlos' church were built in 1735 by de:Hans Holzmeister. Gerlos became a parish in 1891.

Gerlos was first mentioned in a 1507 document as "saltus gerlaise" (Gerlos Pass). The valley and place name "gerlaise" is probably derived from the words "ger", meaning "pointed property", and "laise", a wild stream. Gerlos' forests are also referenced in the same year, under the name "silvam cui nomen Gerleis".

The area experienced a high when gold was discovered in the neighbouring towns of Hainzenberg and Zell am Ziller. Gold was also discovered in Gerlos itself, where it was mined from the 17th century up to 1870. The Gerlos Pass also played an important role in the Tyrolean Rebellion of 1809, when troops from Pinzgau invaded Tyrol.

Although the pass had been, for many centuries, the most important route from Tyrol to Salzburg, there were plans for the construction of a new road as early as 1630, although this never materialised: the roads were still in poor condition in late in the 19th century. In 1866, the "Bote für Tirol" wrote that Gerlos roads had road gradients of 20%, bumpy pavements, rutted tracks over rock ground, and sharp bends. During this period, construction of a railway line had been planned, but this never happened. When construction of a new road began in 1910, huge problems were experienced due to landslide and loosing of the soil. A new road on the Salzburg side was only completed in 1962, by Franz Wallach, the builder of the Grossglockner High Alpine Road. It was another two years before the road on the Tyrolean side was passable. The Funsingau Hydroelectric power plant was also completed around this time.

The population of Gerlos has been increasing since its founding, although the population has fluctuated in recent times.

== Culture ==
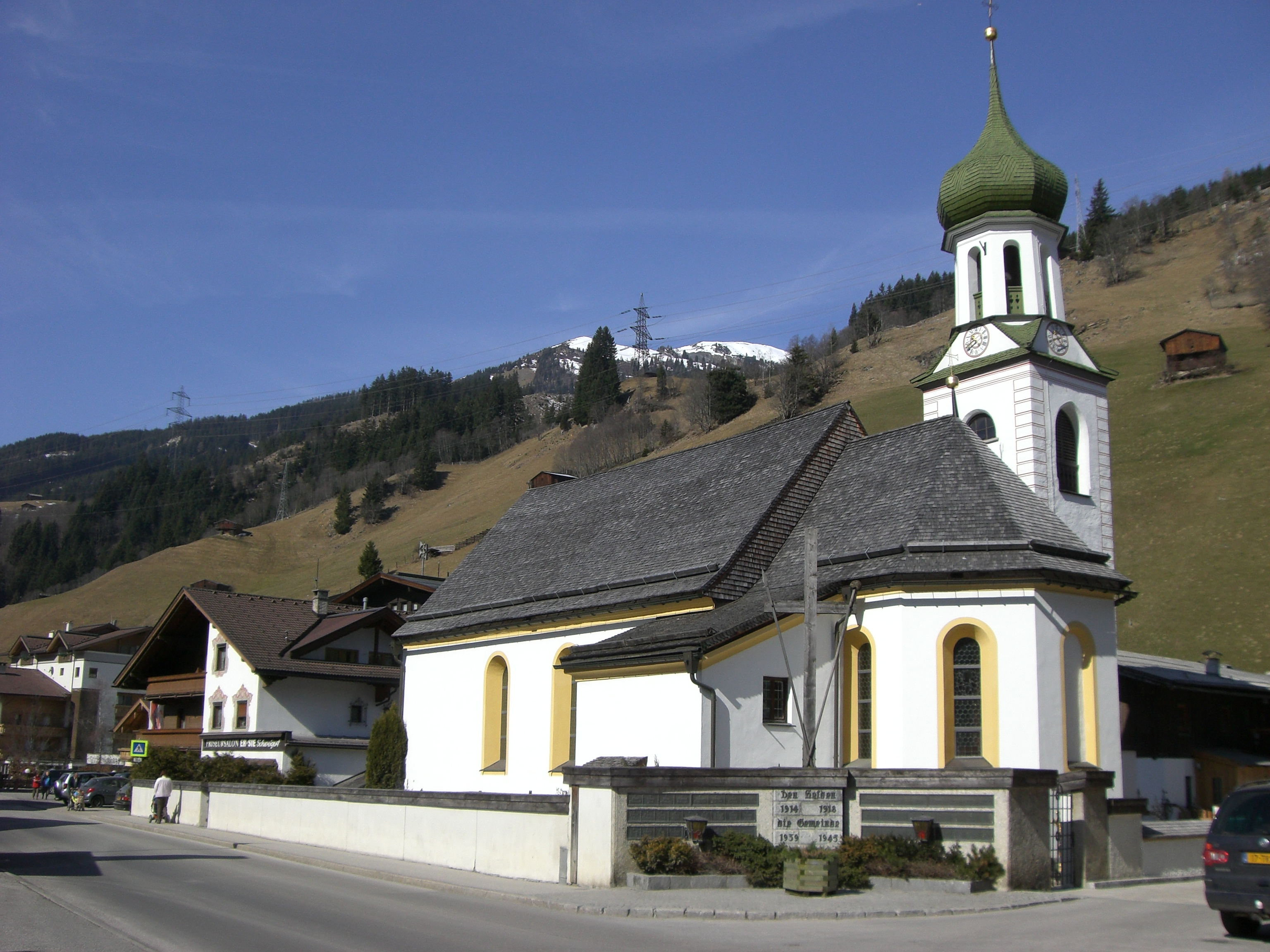
de:Gerlos Pfarrkirche

Gerlos has 5 culturally significant buildings, for example the Gerlos parish church (pictured)

== Economy and infrastructure ==
=== Tourism ===
In addition to electricity generation by the Fusingau power plant and farming, ski tourism plays a key role in the village's economy, as Gerlos has the third highest number of winter overnight stays per year in the ZIllertal, after Mayrhofen and Tux. From 2010 to 2019, the number of overnight stays increased from 590,000 to 670,000. The main ski season is busiest in February, with 125,000 overnight stays. Summer months are also busy, in particular August with 774,000 overnight stays (in 2019)

The skiing season of 2020 was severely impacted by the COVID-19 pandemic - stays over the entire year totaled 486,444, with February overnights being reduced to only 139,347.

=== Traffic ===
The main road through Gerlos is the de:Gerlosstrasse, which connects Zell am Ziller to Mittersill. There is a seasonal bus service from Zell am Ziller at the Zillertalbahn train station.

=== Sports ===
- Swimming in the Durlassboden reservoir
- Hiking in the Kitzbuelher Alps
- Via ferrata in de:Riederklamm
- Mountain biking
- Piste skiing in the Zillertal Arena
- Ski touring

== Politics ==
=== Local council ===
Eleven representatives are elected to the municipal council.

2022 Party	2016		2010	
2022 Party	%	Mandates	%	Mandates
Allgemeine Liste – Liste des Bürgermeisters	61.02	7	56.54	6
Liste für Gerlos	38.98	4		
Voran stark für Gerlos			20.63	2
Neutral für Gerlos			22.84	3

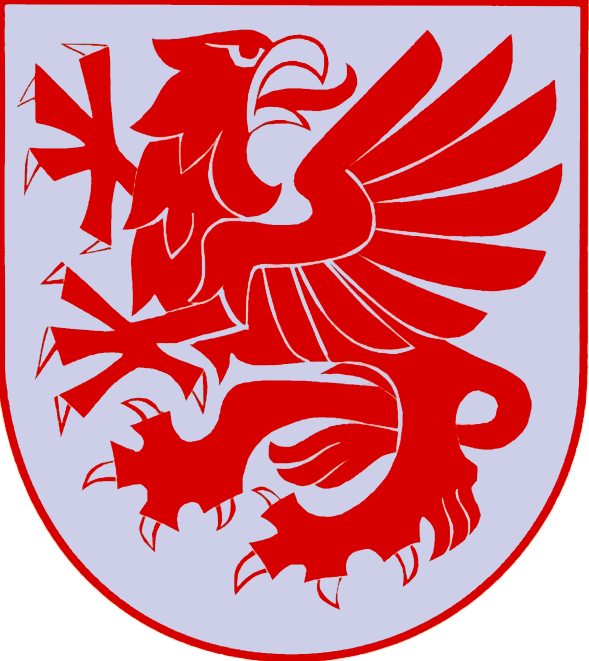
The Gerlos municipal coat of arms.

=== Mayorship ===
- 1974–1992 Johann Kammerlander
- 1992–2009 Franz Hörl (ÖVP)
- since 2009 Andreas Haas

=== Coat of arms ===
The municipal coat of arms of Gerlos was created in 1985. It primarily depicts a griffin, which is the result of the merging of the heraldic animals of Salzburg and Tyrol, the eagle and the lion. This represents the location of the community, being on the border of the states, and also represents the ties to the local archbishopship of Salzburg,

== Notable people ==
=== Honorary citizens ===
- Berthold Beitz (1913-2013) - cofounder of the Zillertal ski area.
- Peter Haas (1927-2017) - a longtime Kapellmeister and Choirmaster in the village.
- Johann Kammerlander (1926-2017) - former mayor of Gerlos, restaurateur.

=== Gerlos born ===
- de:Simon Geisler (1686-1931), politician

=== Associated ===
- Anja Haas, (born 1971) - alpine skier, trains in the village
- de:Franz Hörl (born 1956) - politician, runs a hotel in the village.
