= Torhelm =

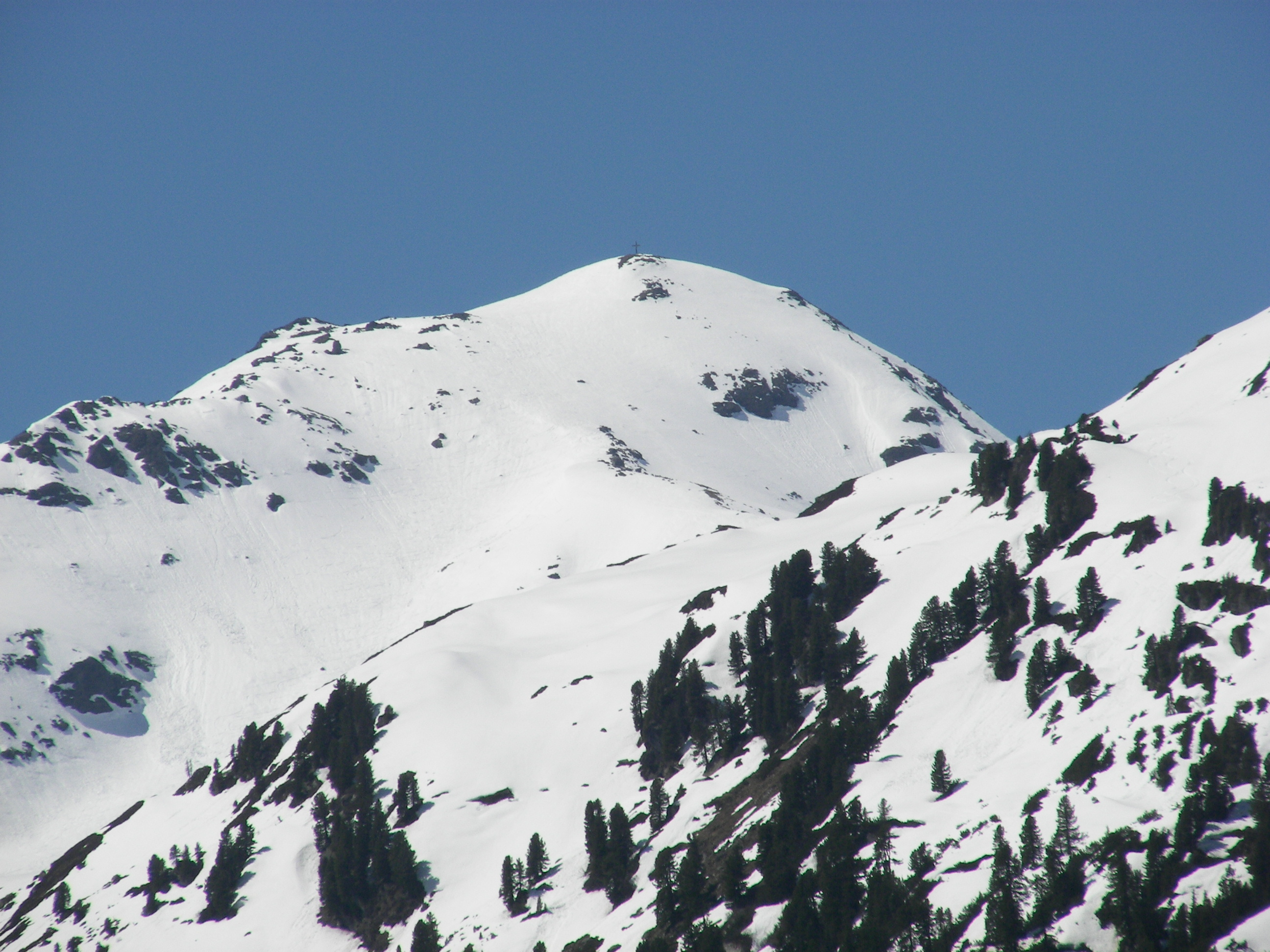

Highest point
- Elevation: 2,494 m (AA) (8,182 ft)
- Coordinates: 47°16′15″N 12°00′15″E

Geography
- Location within Austria
- Location: Tyrol, Austria
- Parent range: Kitzbühel Alps

At a height of 2,494 m (AA) the Torhelm is one of the highest mountains in the Kitzbühel Alps in the Austrian state of Tyrol. It lies at the head of several side valleys of the Ziller and Brixental valleys. Northwest of the summit is the Hemergrund the head of the Märzengrund, a side valley of the Ziller. The Wilde Krimml stream to the southwest drains via the Krummbach and the Gerlos valley into the Ziller valley, whilst the Lange Grund to the northeast runs via the Kelchsau into the Brixental. One of the neighbouring peaks of the Torhelm is the Kreuzjoch (2,558 m).

Many ski tourists visit the Torhelm, especially in the spring, although it is one of the mountains within the Kitzbühel Alps to which the longest ski tours go. Normally it is possible to ski downhill well into the valley on firn until the end of May. In summer the Torhelm is accessible on hiking trails from the Wilder Krimml and the Langer Grund.

On the summit of the Torhelm is a large summit cross made of wood that was erected in 1978. On a bronze plaque is the following inscription:"Schlag ein wenn eine Hand sich gibt, denn Vorsicht braucht es nicht. Der Mensch der seine Berge liebt ist immer grad und schlicht" ("Take it when his hand is offered, for you need not be cautious. The man who loves his mountains is always straight and true.")

Not far away (on the other side of the Gerlos valley) is another mountain also called the Torhelm, which is a smaller neighbour of the Brandberger Kolm.

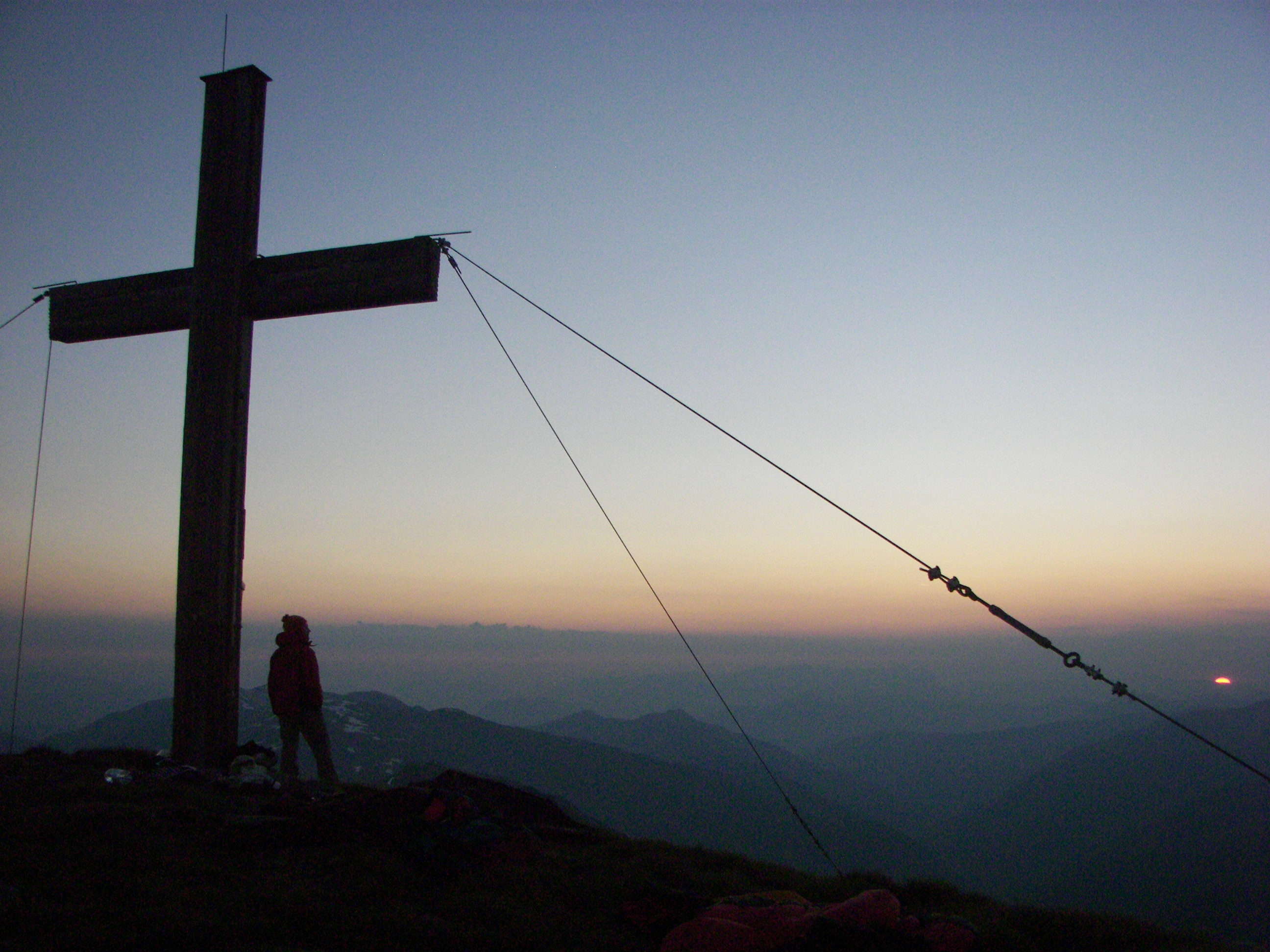
Sunrise at the summit, looking towards the Wilder Kaiser

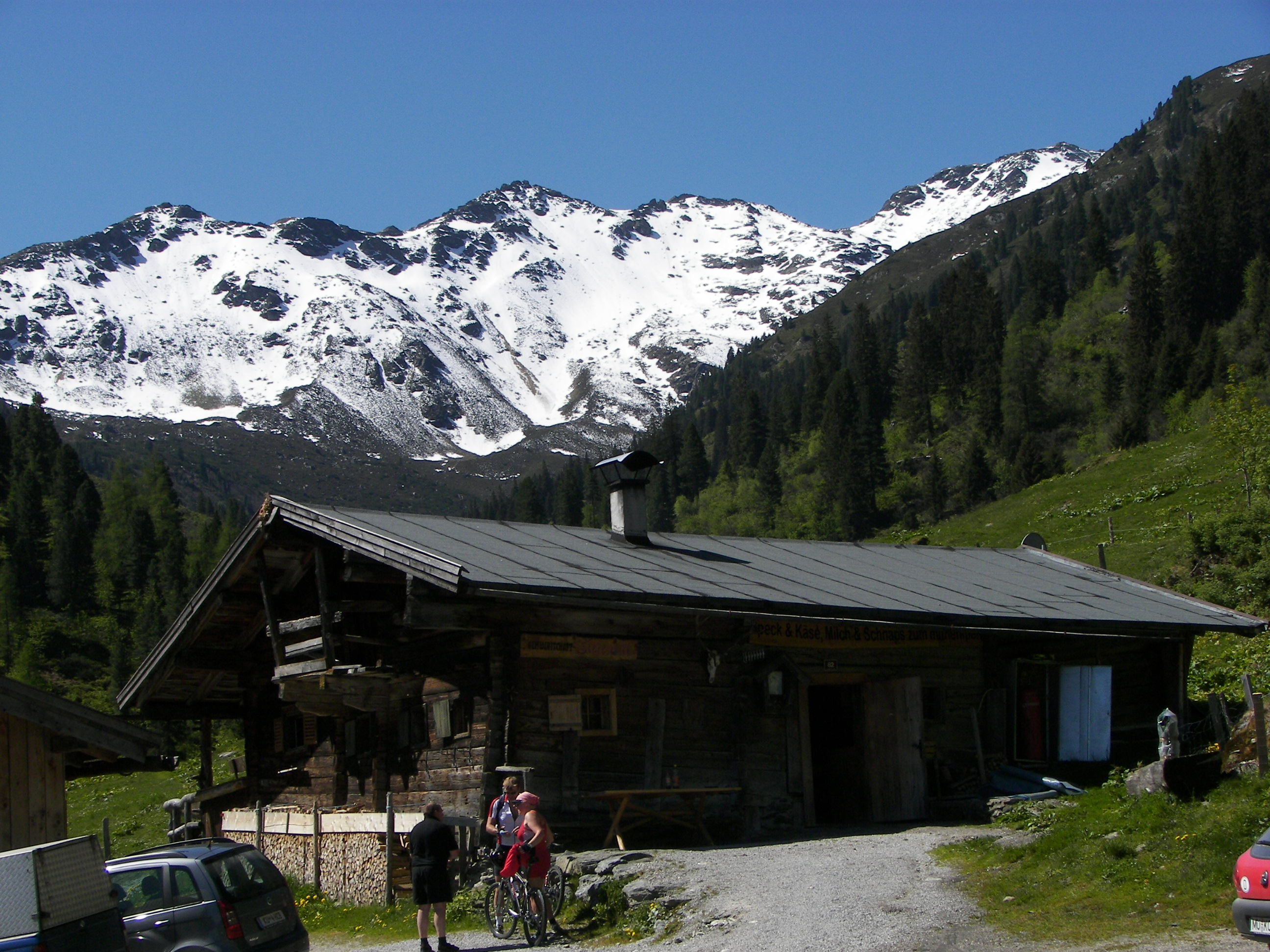
View of the Torhelm (far right) from the Tiefentalalm at the head of the 'Langen Grund' valley, Kelchsau
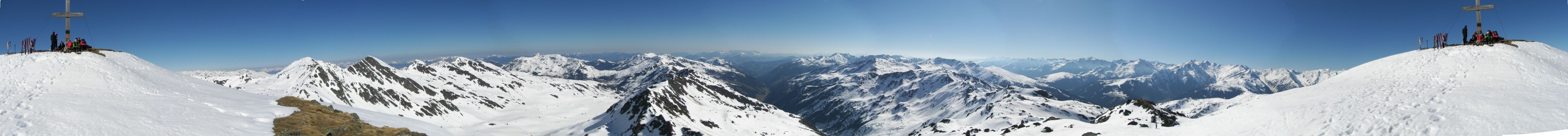
360° panorama from the summit of the Torhelm
