= Cerveza Zillertal =

Uruguayan beer brand

Cerveza Zillertal is a beer brand from Uruguay. Its flagship is a pilsner lager, and the brand also produces IPAs and Scottish-style red beer. The brand name is a reference to the valley Zillertal in Tyrol, Austria.
