= Kreuzjoch (Kitzbühel Alps) =

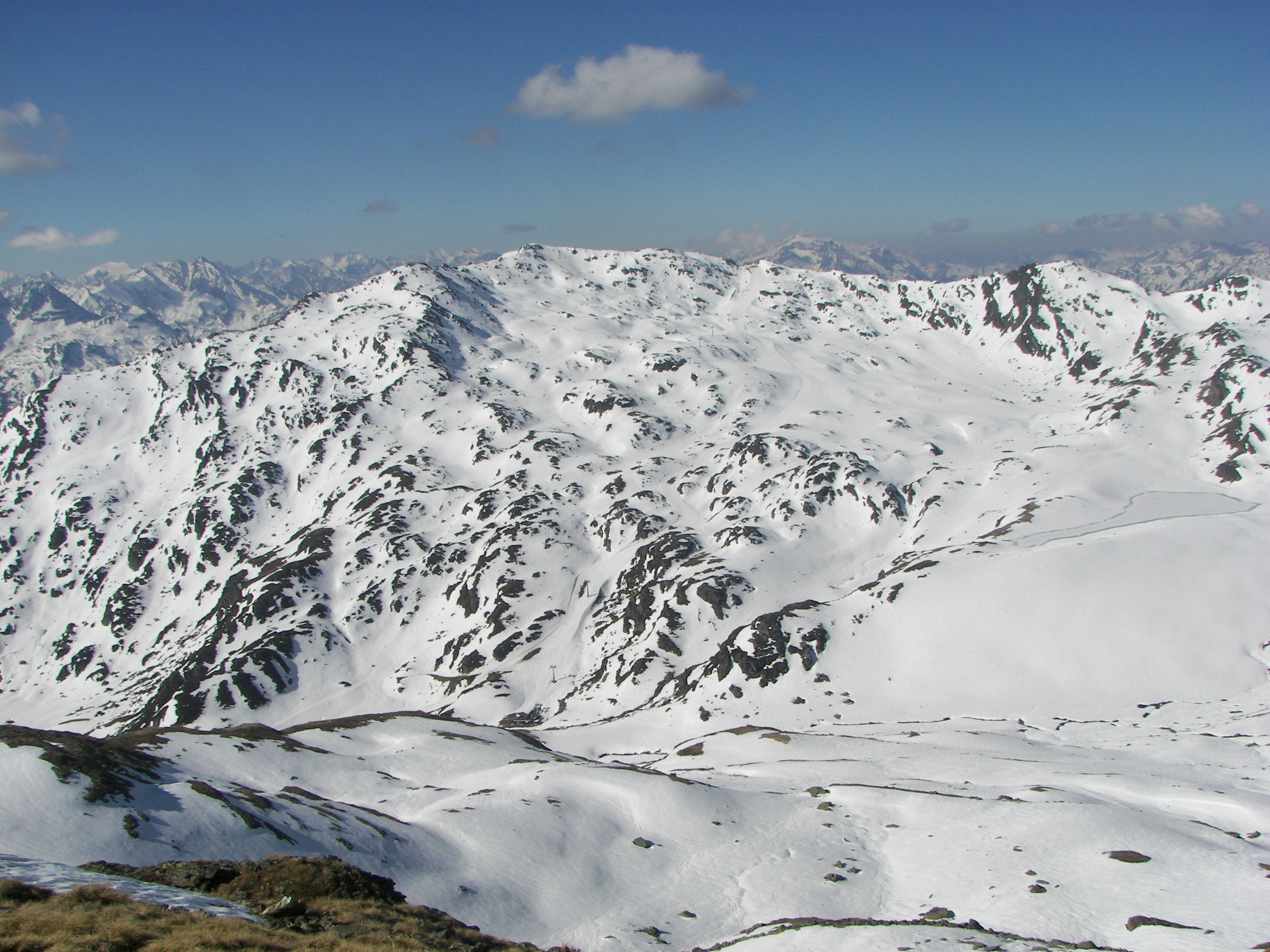
- The Kreuzjoch seen from the Torhelm

Highest point
- Elevation: 2,558 m (AA) (8,392 ft)
- Listing: Alpine mountains 2500-2999 m
- Coordinates: 47°15′06″N 11°58′57″E

Geography
- Location within Austria
- Location: Tyrol, Austria
- Parent range: Kitzbühel Alps

At 2,558 m above sea level (AA) the Kreuzjoch is the highest peak in the Kitzbühel Alps in the Austrian state of Tyrol.

The Kreuzjoch also forms the southwestern end of the Kitzbühel Alps. To the west it is bounded by the Ziller valley, to the southeast by the Gerlos valley. The Kreuzjoch's neighbouring peak is the Torhelm (2,494 m).
