= Amlach power station =

Run-of-the-river hydroelectricity in Austria

Amlach Power Station
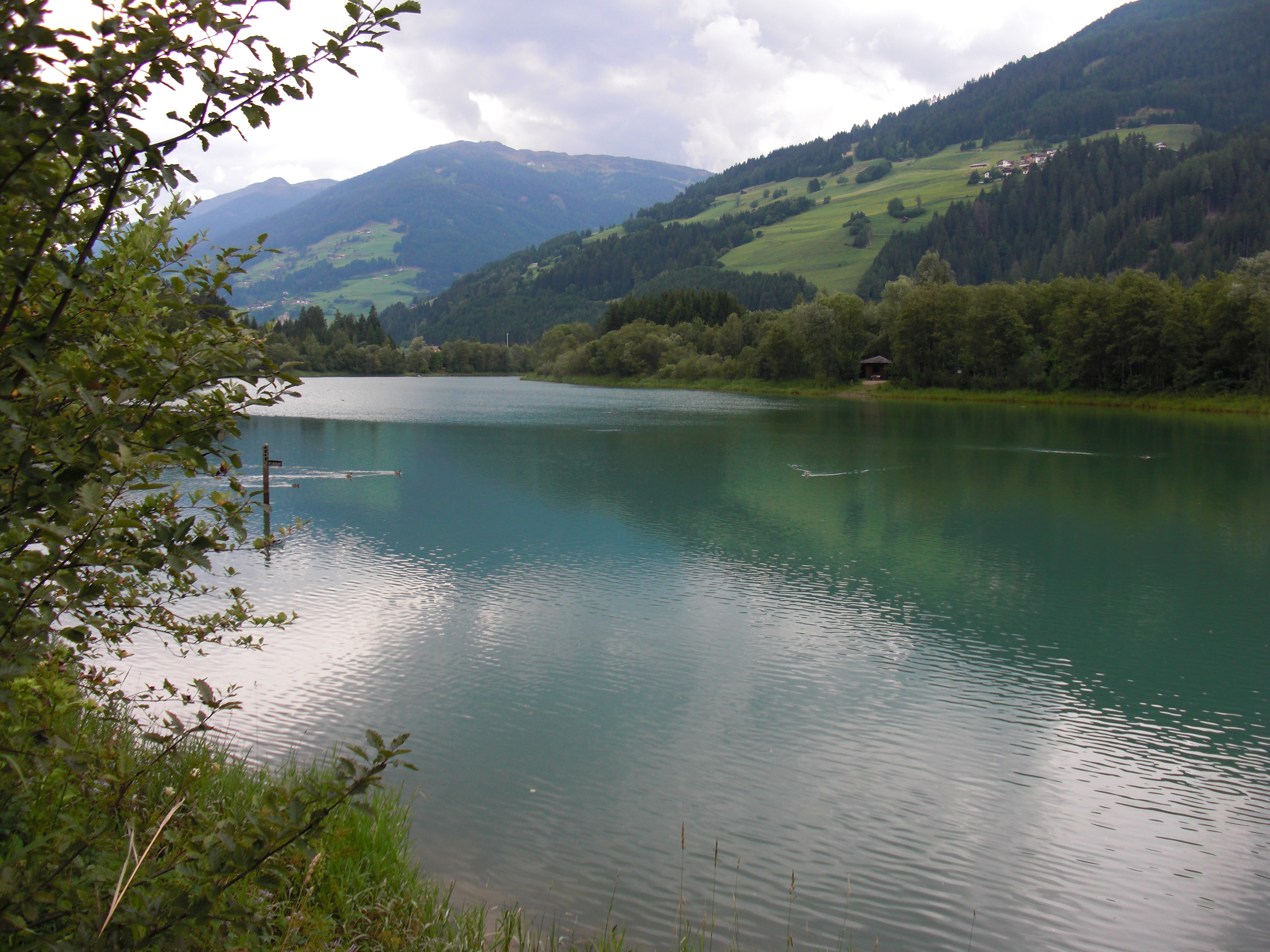
- Official name: Kraftwerk Amlach
- Country: Austria
- Coordinates: 46.8016°N 12.7495°E
- Status: Operational
- Commission date: March 1989
- Owner: Tiroler Wasserkraft
- Operator: Tiroler Wasserkraft

Power generation
- Nameplate capacity: 60 MW

External links
- Website: www.tiwag.at/ueber-die-tiwag/kraftwerke/bestehende-kraftwerke/kraftwerkspark/#c665
- Commons: Related media on Commons

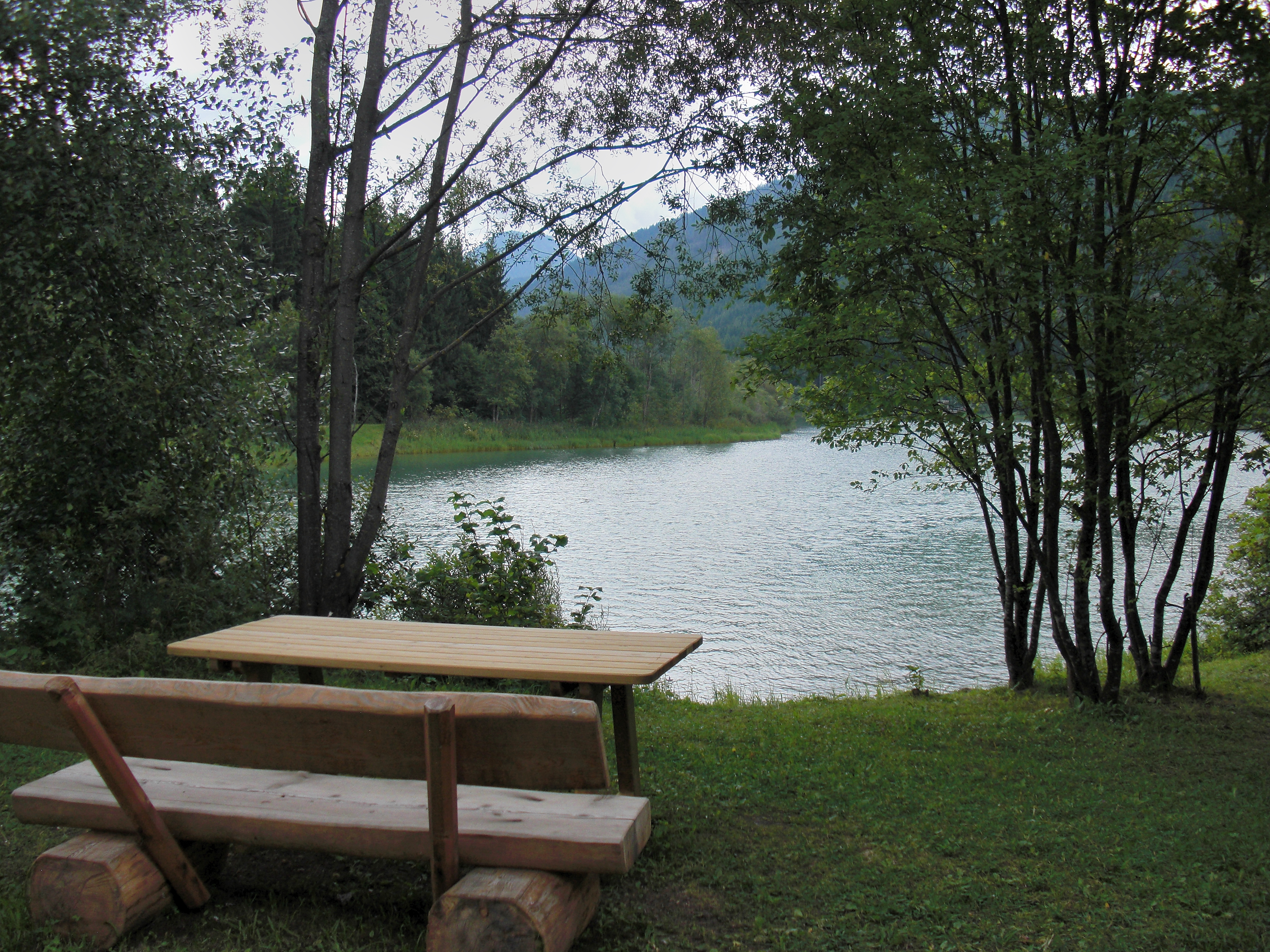
Lake Tassenbach (Speicher Tassenbach), source of water for Amlach power station

Amlach power station (Kraftwerk Amlach) is a diversionary-run-of-the-river hydroelectricity generating station on the Drava river in Austria. The power station is operated by Tiroler Wasserkraft (TIWAG) on river water flowing between Tassenbach, Strassen, Tyrol and Amlach, near Lienz.

It is the only run-of-river power station in Tyrol. A small natural lake next to Tassenbach railway station is used for water extraction and daily buffering also known as pondage. Then, the water flows 24 kilometres (15 mi) via underground pipes down a height of 370 metres (1,200 ft) to the power station at Amlach, where two 60-Megawatt Francis turbines are installed. Although GlobalData reports that both of the turbines have 34MW of nameplate capacity. After which the water is returnjed to the river Drava via a short draft tube and tail race. It has generated 219 GWh of electricity. The generator capacity is 42 MVA, divided amongst two generators. It has a catchment area of 422 km^{2}, a falling height of 370 metres, bottling capacity of 60 MW, and 219 GWh of standard working assets.

For the official opening in March 1989, a special charter train transported guests, including Alois Partl, directly from Innsbruck Hauptbahnhof to a temporary station on the Drava Valley Railway close to the power station.

== See also ==
- List of power stations in Austria
