= Zillergründl Dam =

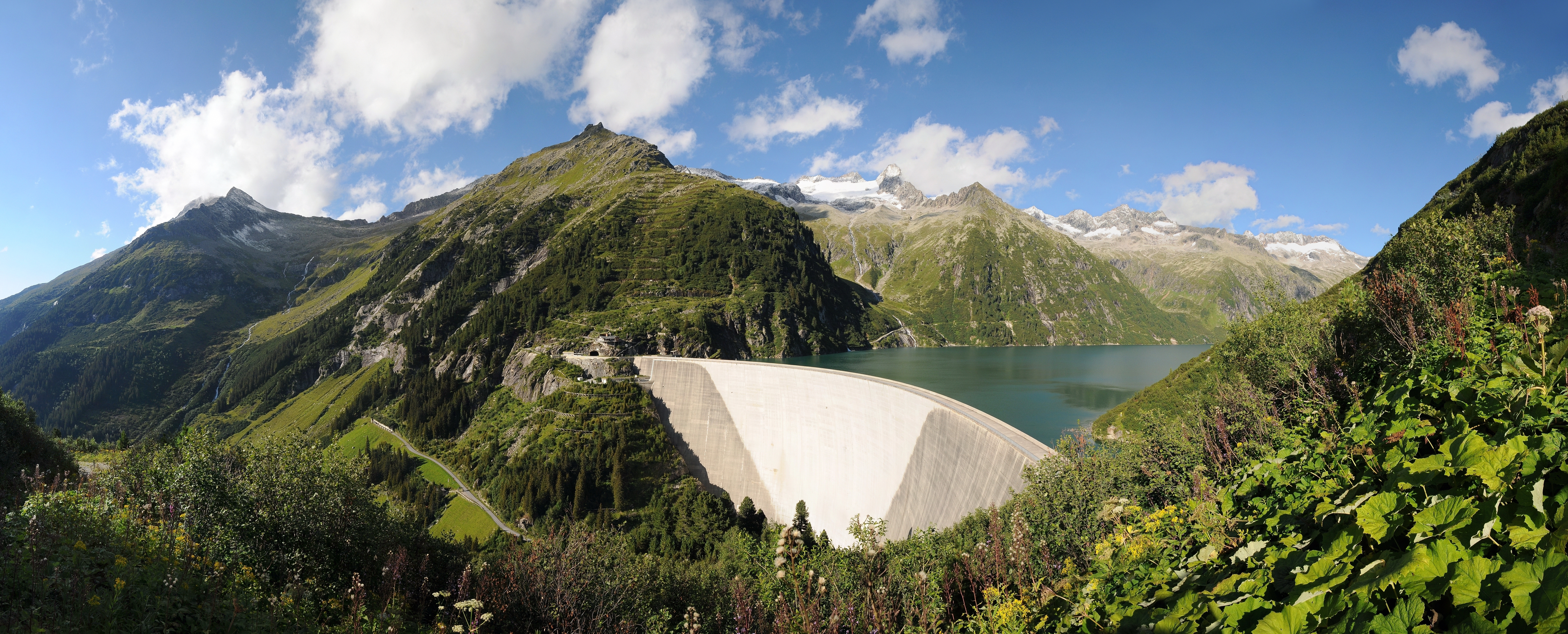

- Location within Austria
- Country: Austria
- Coordinates: 47°07′15″N 12°03′43″E
- Status: Operational
- Construction began: 1981
- Opening date: 1986
- Owner: Verbund AG

Dam and spillways
- Type of dam: Arch, variable-radius
- Impounds: Ziller River
- Height: 186 m (610 ft)
- Length: 502 m (1,647 ft)
- Elevation at crest: 1,850.7 m (6,072 ft)
- Width (crest): 6 m (20 ft)
- Width (base): 36 m (118 ft)
- Dam volume: 1,373,000 m^{3} (1,795,816 cu yd)

Reservoir
- Creates: Zillergründl Reservoir
- Total capacity: 89,500,000 m^{3} (72,559 acre⋅ft)
- Active capacity: 88,800,000 m^{3} (71,991 acre⋅ft)
- Catchment area: 67 km^{2} (26 sq mi)
- Normal elevation: 1,850 m (6,070 ft)

Häusling Power Plant
- Coordinates: 47°08′46″N 11°58′02″E
- Commission date: 1986-1988
- Hydraulic head: 744 m (2,441 ft)
- Turbines: 2 x 180 MW Francis-type
- Installed capacity: 360 MW
- Annual generation: 179.4 GWh

The Zillergründl Dam is an arch dam on the Ziller River in the upper Ziller Valley of Tyrol state, Austria. It lies 16 km (10 mi) east of Mayrhofen. The primary purpose of the dam is hydroelectric power generation and it supports a 360 MW pumped-storage power station. As part of the Zemm-Ziller Development, construction on the dam began in 1981 and, along with the Häusling Pumped Storage Power Plant, it was completed in 1986. The power plant was fully commissioned by 1988. The dam is the second tallest in Austria.

== Design and operation ==
At an elevation of 1,850.7 m (6,072 ft) above sea level, the Zillergründl is a 186 m (610 ft) tall and 502 m (1,647 ft) long variable-radius arch dam with a structural volume of 1,373,000 m^{3} (1,795,816 cu yd). The dam is 6 m (20 ft) wide at its crest and 36 m (118 ft) at its base. Its reservoir has a capacity of 89,500,000 m^{3} (72,559 acre⋅ft), of which 88,800,000 m^{3} (71,991 acre⋅ft) is active (or "useful") capacity. At normal levels, the reservoir has a catchment area of 67 km^{2} (26 sq mi). The reservoir operates at elevations from 1,850 m (6,070 ft) to 1,740 m (5,709 ft), which is the draw-down level.

Water released from the reservoir reaches the Häusling Power Plant 10 km (6 mi) downstream. The power plant is located at an elevation of 1,060 m (3,478 ft) and contains two 180 MW Francis turbine-generators. It is afforded 744 m (2,441 ft) of hydraulic head given the difference in elevations. Using its pumped-storage capability, the power-station receives water from the Stillupp Reservoir 8 km (5 mi) to the west in an adjacent valley at 47°07′17″N 11°51′58″E and pumps it up to the Zillergründl Reservoir. The pumping and replenishment of the reservoir occur at night, during low energy demand periods. The process is repeated; electricity is generated during high-demand periods and pumping occurs during low-demand periods when electricity is cheaper.

== See also ==
- List of tallest dams in the world
- List of power stations in Austria
