= Fernitz =

- Former municipality
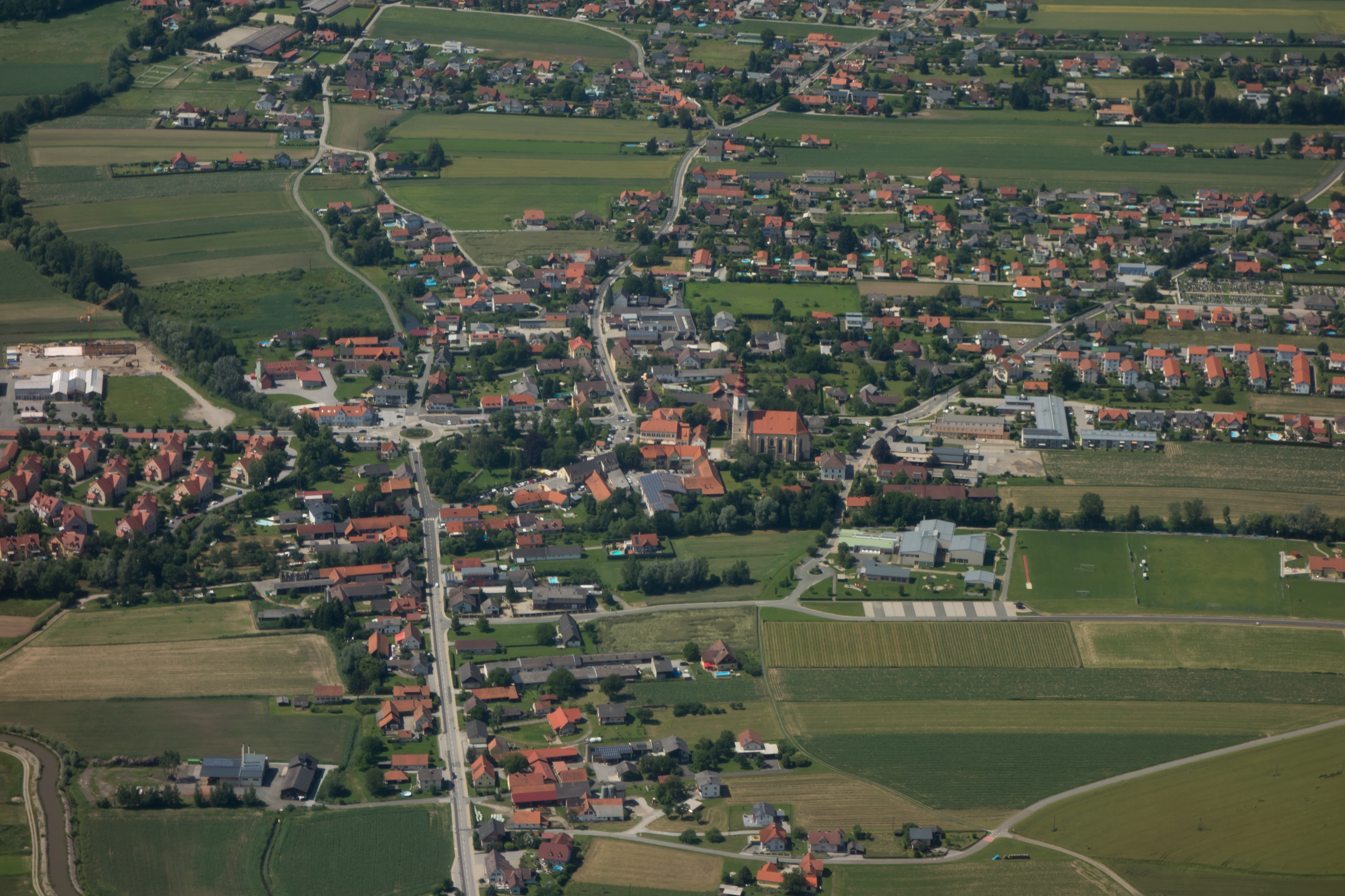
- Fernitz

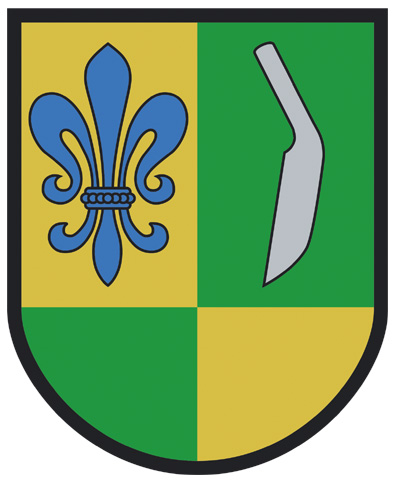
- Coat of arms

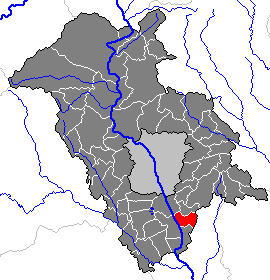
- Location within Graz-Umgebung district

- Location within Austria
- Coordinates: 46°58′27″N 15°29′54″E
- Country: Austria
- State: Styria
- District: Graz-Umgebung

Area
  - Total: 10.58 km^{2} (4.08 sq mi)
- Elevation: 321 m (1,053 ft)

Population (2014-01-01)
  - Total: 3,300
  - Density: 310/km^{2} (810/sq mi)
- Time zone: UTC+1 (CET)
  - Summer (DST): UTC+2 (CEST)
- Postal code: 8072
- Area code: 03135
- Vehicle registration: GU
- Website: www.fernitz. steiermark.at

Fernitz was a municipality in Austria which merged in January 2015 into Fernitz-Mellach in the Graz-Umgebung District of Styria, Austria.

== Population ==
Historical population
Year	Pop.	±%
1869	971	—
1880	1,001	+3.1%
1890	993	−0.8%
1900	1,016	+2.3%
1910	1,112	+9.4%
1923	1,098	−1.3%
1934	1,107	+0.8%
1939	1,117	+0.9%
1951	1,213	+8.6%
1961	1,455	+20.0%
1971	1,664	+14.4%
1981	1,907	+14.6%
1991	2,379	+24.8%
2001	2,773	+16.6%
2014	3,300	+19.0%
