= Mellach =

- Former municipality
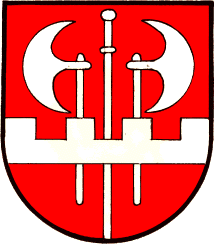
- Coat of arms

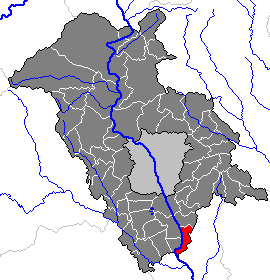
- Location within Graz-Umgebung district

- Location within Austria
- Coordinates: 46°56′31″N 15°30′58″E
- Country: Austria
- State: Styria
- District: Graz-Umgebung

Area
  - Total: 9.95 km^{2} (3.84 sq mi)
- Elevation: 340 m (1,120 ft)

Population (2014-01-01)
  - Total: 1,257
  - Density: 126/km^{2} (327/sq mi)
- Time zone: UTC+1 (CET)
  - Summer (DST): UTC+2 (CEST)
- Postal code: 8072, 8410
- Area code: 0 31 35
- Vehicle registration: GU
- Website: www.mellach.steiermark.at

Mellach was a municipality in Austria which merged in January 2015 into Fernitz-Mellach in the Graz-Umgebung District of Styria, Austria.

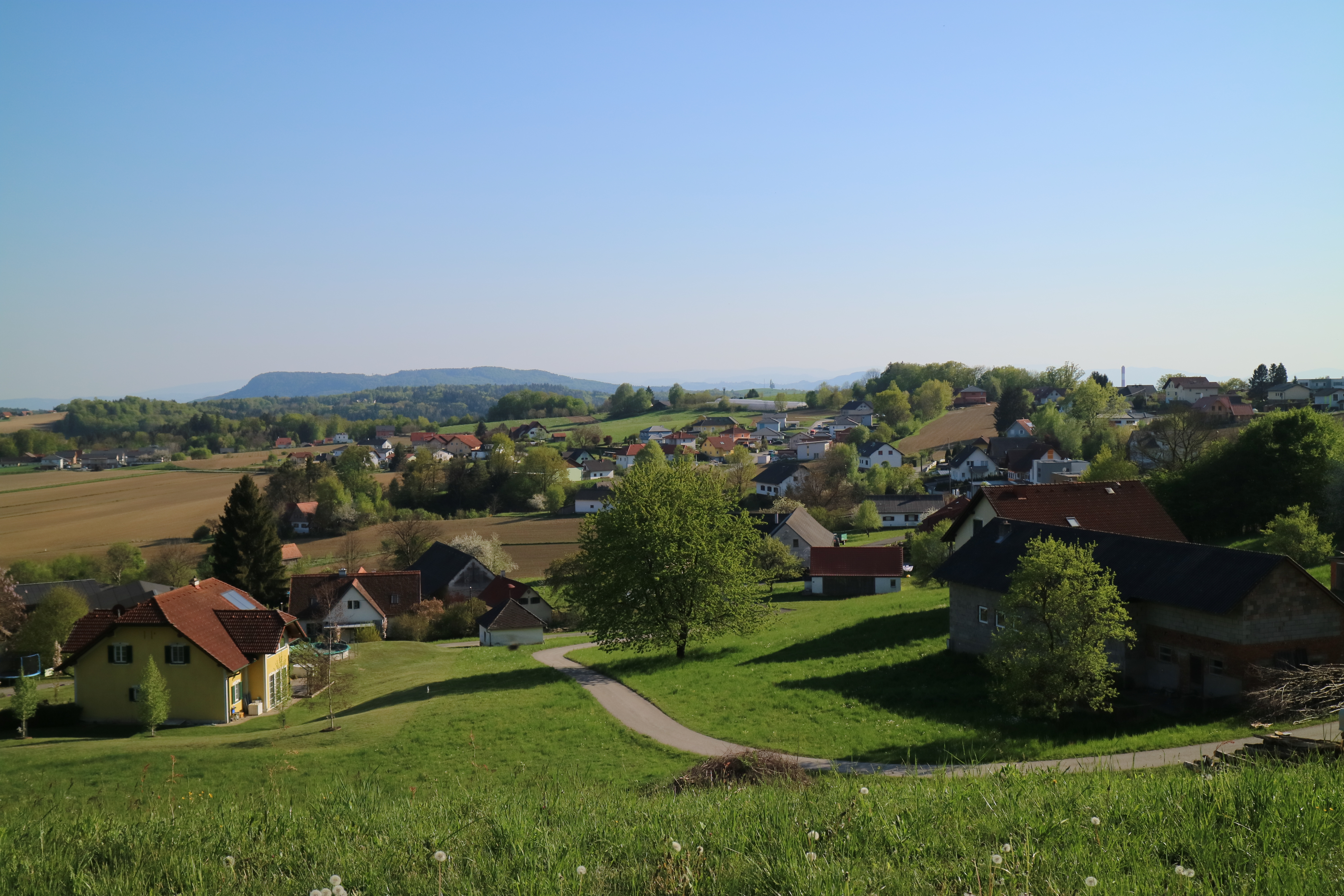
Mellach from the north

== Geography ==
Mellach lies about 15 km (9.3 mi) south of Graz in the Graz basin in the east Styrian hills on the Mur river.

=== Subdivisions ===
The municipality comprises Dillach, Enzelsdorf, Oberenzelsdorf, and Mellach.
