= Zell am Ziller =

- Municipality
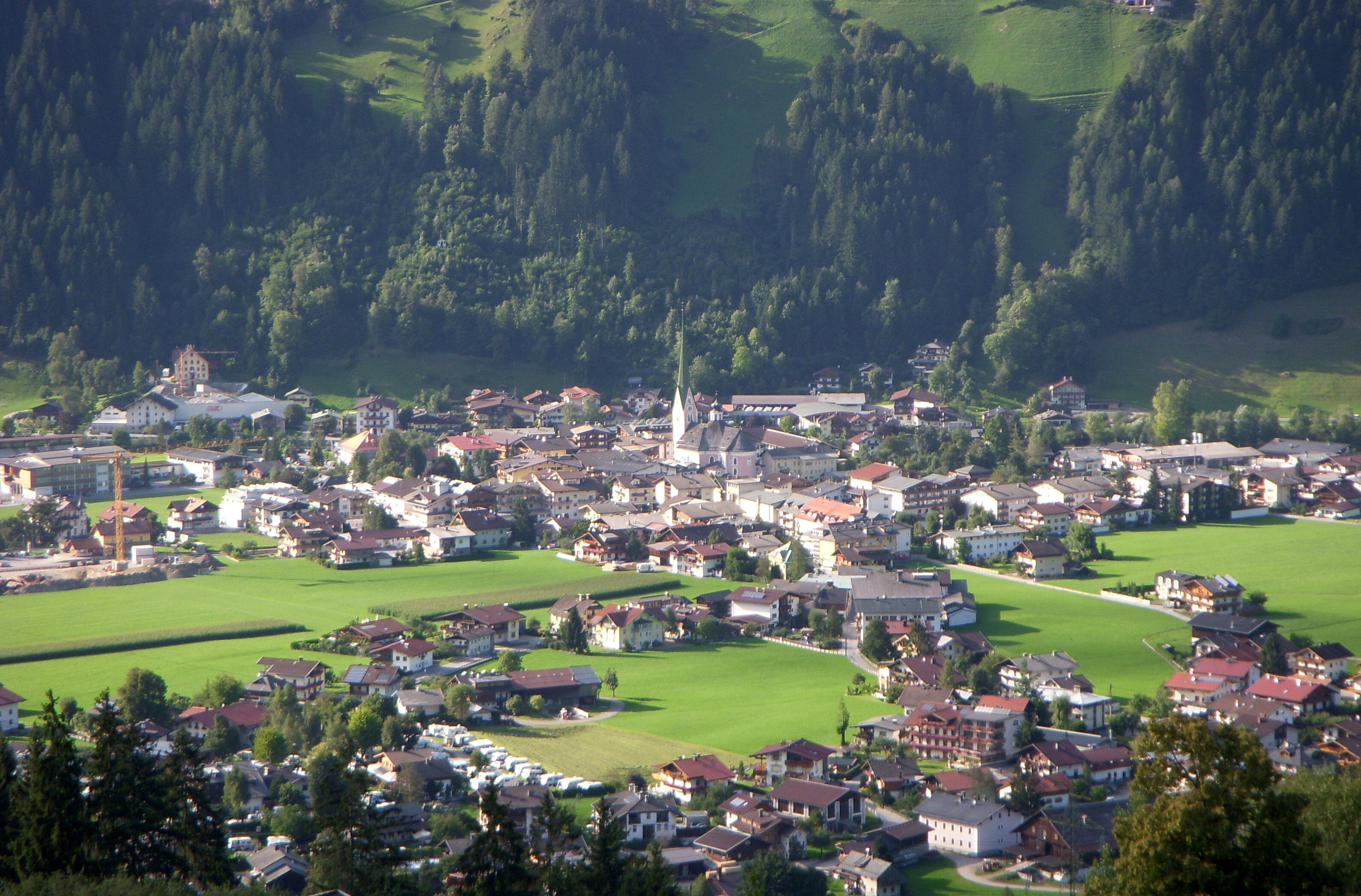
- Zell am Ziller

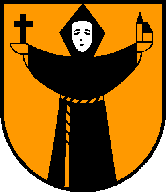
- Coat of arms

- Location within Austria
- Coordinates: 47°13′59″N 11°52′55″E
- Country: Austria
- State: Tyrol
- District: Schwaz

Government
  - Mayor: Robert Pramstrahler

Area
  - Total: 2.44 km^{2} (0.94 sq mi)
- Elevation: 575 m (1,886 ft)

Population (2020)
  - Total: 1,716
  - Density: 703/km^{2} (1,820/sq mi)
- Time zone: UTC+1 (CET)
  - Summer (DST): UTC+2 (CEST)
- Postal code: 6280
- Area code: 05282
- Vehicle registration: SZ
- Website: gemeinde-zell.at

Zell am Ziller is a municipality in the Schwaz district in the Austrian state of Tyrol. The name derives from the river Ziller, which receives the Gerlosbach near Zell am Ziller.

== Climate ==
Climate data for Zell am Ziller (1971–2000)
Month	Jan	Feb	Mar	Apr	May	Jun	Jul	Aug	Sep	Oct	Nov	Dec	Year
Record high °C (°F)	16.9 (62.4)	17.6 (63.7)	24.0 (75.2)	27.0 (80.6)	30.2 (86.4)	35.1 (95.2)	36.5 (97.7)	35.3 (95.5)	30.7 (87.3)	27.8 (82.0)	21.0 (69.8)	19.4 (66.9)	36.5 (97.7)
Mean daily maximum °C (°F)	1.8 (35.2)	4.5 (40.1)	10.3 (50.5)	14.3 (57.7)	19.6 (67.3)	21.8 (71.2)	24.2 (75.6)	23.7 (74.7)	20.2 (68.4)	14.9 (58.8)	7.0 (44.6)	2.0 (35.6)	13.7 (56.7)
Daily mean °C (°F)	−2.8 (27.0)	−1.1 (30.0)	3.6 (38.5)	7.3 (45.1)	12.2 (54.0)	14.8 (58.6)	17.0 (62.6)	16.4 (61.5)	13.0 (55.4)	7.9 (46.2)	1.9 (35.4)	−2.2 (28.0)	7.3 (45.1)
Mean daily minimum °C (°F)	−6.4 (20.5)	−5.0 (23.0)	−1.1 (30.0)	2.2 (36.0)	6.4 (43.5)	9.5 (49.1)	11.5 (52.7)	11.2 (52.2)	8.2 (46.8)	3.7 (38.7)	−1.5 (29.3)	−5.4 (22.3)	2.8 (37.0)
Record low °C (°F)	−24.0 (−11.2)	−16.5 (2.3)	−20.0 (−4.0)	−5.7 (21.7)	−4.5 (23.9)	1.0 (33.8)	0.7 (33.3)	2.8 (37.0)	−2.4 (27.7)	−6.0 (21.2)	−14.5 (5.9)	−24.0 (−11.2)	−24.0 (−11.2)
Average precipitation mm (inches)	58.0 (2.28)	44.4 (1.75)	56.6 (2.23)	72.1 (2.84)	94.8 (3.73)	135.1 (5.32)	159.5 (6.28)	143.1 (5.63)	98.1 (3.86)	63.3 (2.49)	73.5 (2.89)	71.6 (2.82)	1,070.1 (42.13)
Average snowfall cm (inches)	10.3 (4.1)	14.8 (5.8)	8.1 (3.2)	0.8 (0.3)	0.3 (0.1)	0.0 (0.0)	0.0 (0.0)	0.0 (0.0)	0.0 (0.0)	0.0 (0.0)	5.7 (2.2)	17.4 (6.9)	57.4 (22.6)
Average precipitation days (≥ 1.0 mm)	8.2	7.4	9.5	11.0	12.2	15.2	15.4	14.5	10.6	8.9	9.4	9.5	131.8
Average relative humidity (%) (at 14:00)	73.6	60.9	51.1	49.1	49.2	53.0	53.0	55.5	56.1	57.7	68.5	79.7	59.0
Mean monthly sunshine hours	42.9	79.1	118.2	124.5	159.9	151.1	172.2	164.1	143.1	117.6	59.5	41.6	1,373.8
Percentage possible sunshine	38.3	48.7	53.6	45.7	48.4	46.3	52.5	54.9	60.5	61.1	47.0	48.5	50.5
Source: Central Institute for Meteorology and Geodynamics

== Population ==
Historical population
Year	Pop.	±%
1869	845	—
1880	810	−4.1%
1890	661	−18.4%
1900	750	+13.5%
1910	969	+29.2%
1923	961	−0.8%
1934	1,088	+13.2%
1939	1,153	+6.0%
1951	1,465	+27.1%
1961	1,510	+3.1%
1971	1,882	+24.6%
1981	1,865	−0.9%
1991	1,802	−3.4%
2001	1,884	+4.6%
2011	1,722	−8.6%

== Facilities ==
The Zillertal Arena was formed in 2000 from a merger of the ski areas of Zell, Gerlos and Königsleiten and is the largest ski area in the Ziller valley. It is accessed by the Rosenalmbahn and, since the 2010/11 season, by the Karspitzbahn, whose valley station is located in the parish of Zell. Several ski bus companies operate in Zell am Ziller during the skiing season. When there is sufficient snow, cross-country skiing trails are cut at Ziller (both classic and, in some cases, skating).
