= Tiroler Wasserkraft =

Austrian electric utilities company

- Industry: energy supply
- Headquarters: Innsbruck, Austria

Tiroler Wasserkraft AG (TIWAG) is an Austrian company that generates electricity from hydropower based in Innsbruck, Austria.

The company mainly produces electricity through hydropower. The company operates several hydropower plants in the Tyrol region of Austria, including the Kühtai, Pitztal, and Martell power plants.

It operates the Amlach power station on the river Drava.
