= Strass im Zillertal =

- Municipality
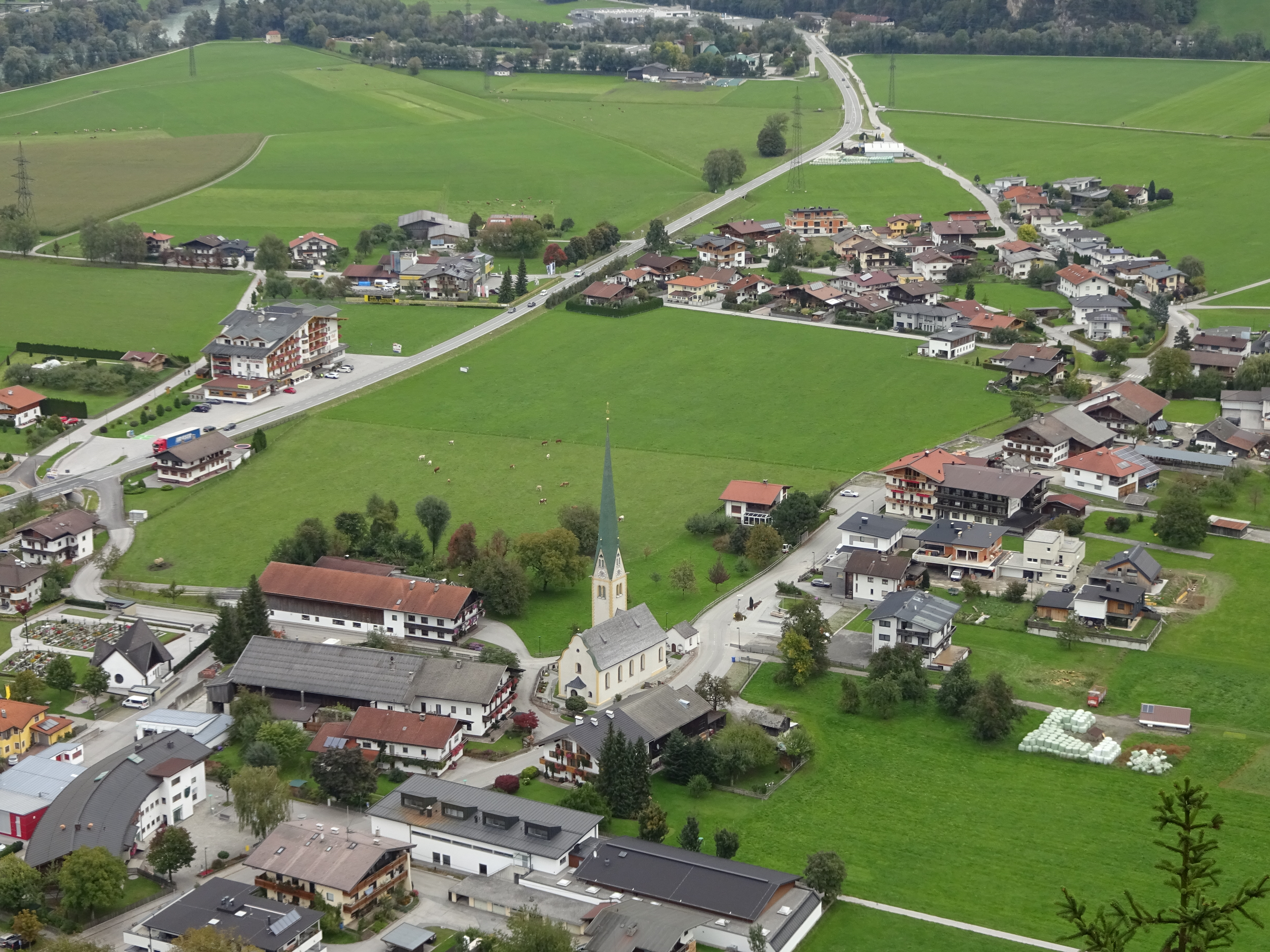
- Center of the village

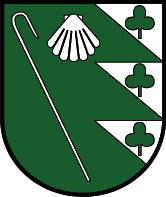
- Coat of arms

- Location within Austria
- Coordinates: 47°23′00″N 11°49′00″E
- Country: Austria
- State: Tyrol
- District: Schwaz

Government
  - Mayor: Karl Eberharter

Area
  - Total: 5.95 km^{2} (2.30 sq mi)
- Elevation: 523 m (1,716 ft)

Population (2021)
  - Total: 860
  - Density: 140/km^{2} (370/sq mi)
- Time zone: UTC+1 (CET)
  - Summer (DST): UTC+2 (CEST)
- Postal code: 6261
- Area code: 05244
- Vehicle registration: SZ
- Website: https://www.strass-zillertal.gv.at/

Strass im Zillertal is a municipality in the Schwaz district in the Austrian state of Tyrol. The Ziller river flows into the Inn by Strass im Zillertal.

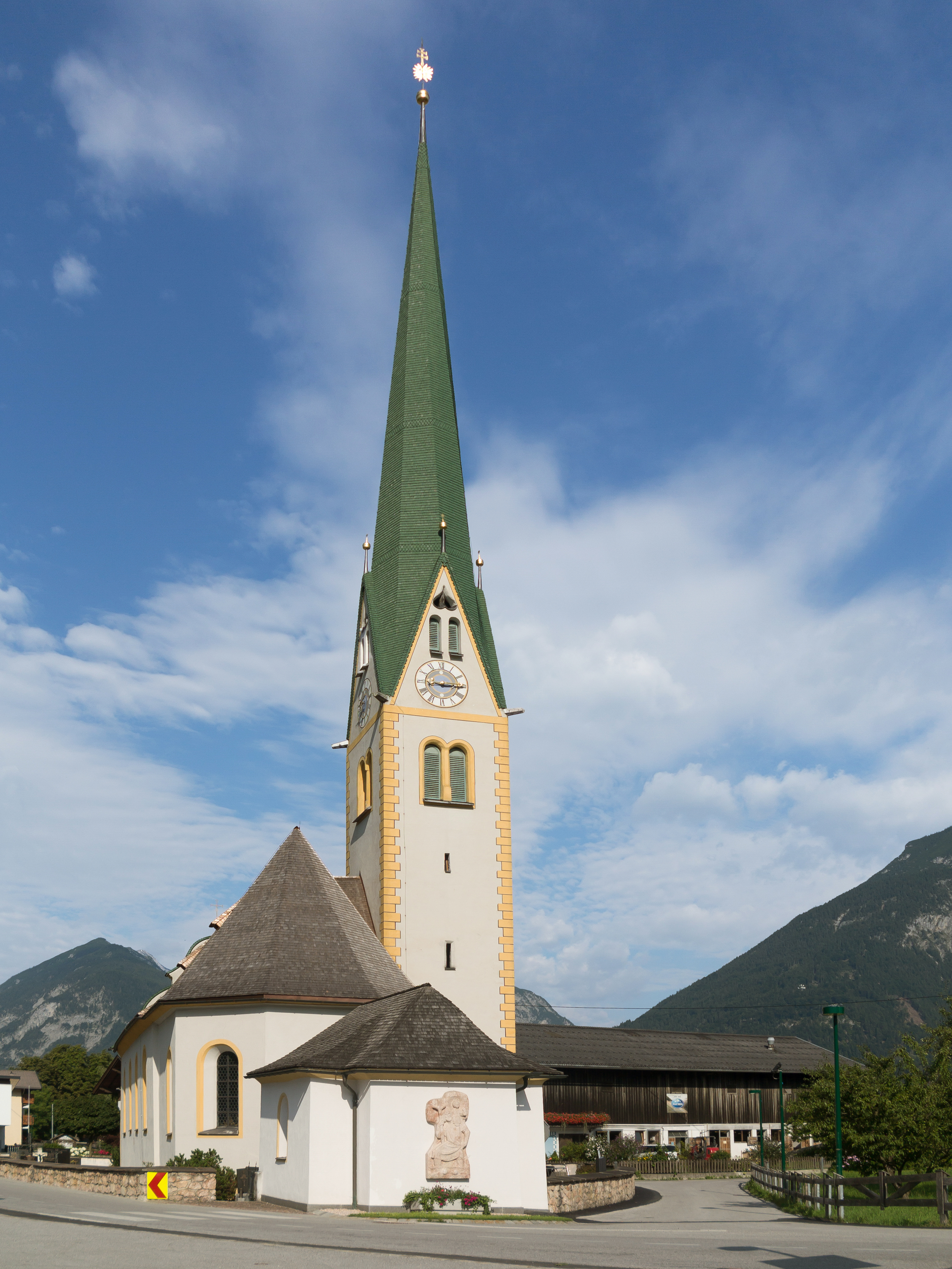
Church (Katholische Pfarrkirche Sankt Jakob) in Strass im Zillertal
