= Ziller =

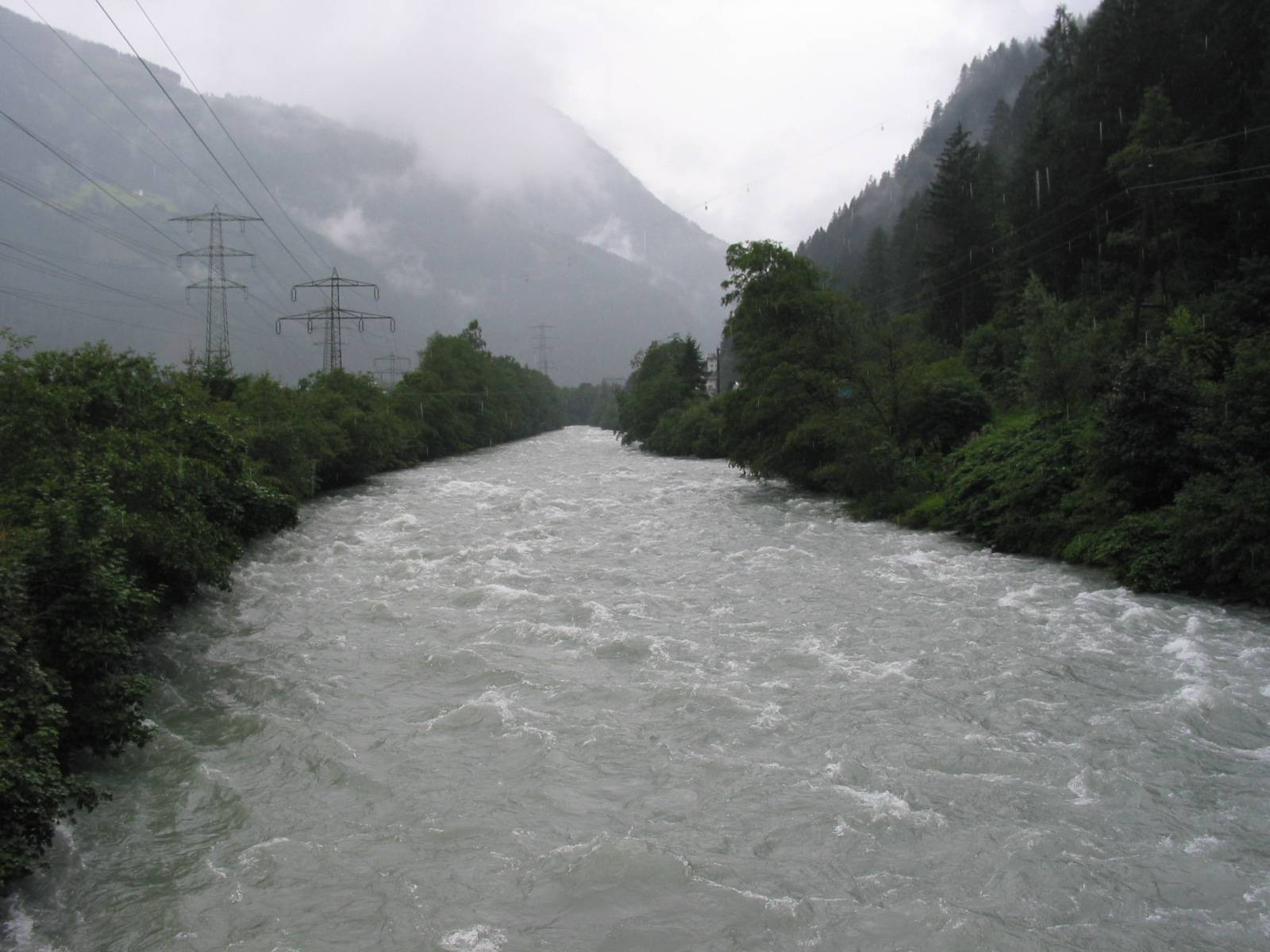
- Ziller near Mayrhofen

- Mouth of Ziller

Location
- Country: Austria
- State: Tyrol

Physical characteristics
- Source
  - location: Zillertal Alps
- Mouth
  - location: Inn
  - coordinates: 47.4070°N 11.8372°E
- Length: 55.7 km (34.6 mi)
- Basin size: 1,135 km^{2} (438 sq mi)

Basin features
- Progression: Inn→ Danube→ Black Sea

The Ziller (German pronunciation: [ˈt͡sɪlɐ]) is a right tributary to the Inn, in the Zillertal in Tyrol, Austria. It is 55.7 km (34.6 mi) long, and its basin area is 1,135 km^{2} (438 sq mi). It springs from the main ridge of the Zillertal Alps, and after a few kilometers flowing northwest feeds the Zillergründl Dam. In Mayrhofen it receives the Zemmbach (that in turn receives the Tuxbach). By Zell am Ziller, it receives the Gerlosbach, before flowing into the Inn by Strass im Zillertal.

For historical reasons, the Ziller—first mentioned in 927 as Zilare—for most of its course makes up the border between the Diocese of Innsbruck on the west and the Archdiocese of Salzburg on the east. The Ziller today shows a good presence of brown trout and rainbow trout, as well as grayling. It is up to 20 m (66 ft) wide and 2 m (6 ft 7 in) deep, and it has an average discharge of 43.1 m^{3}/s (1,520 cu ft/s).
