= Fernitz-Mellach =

- Municipality
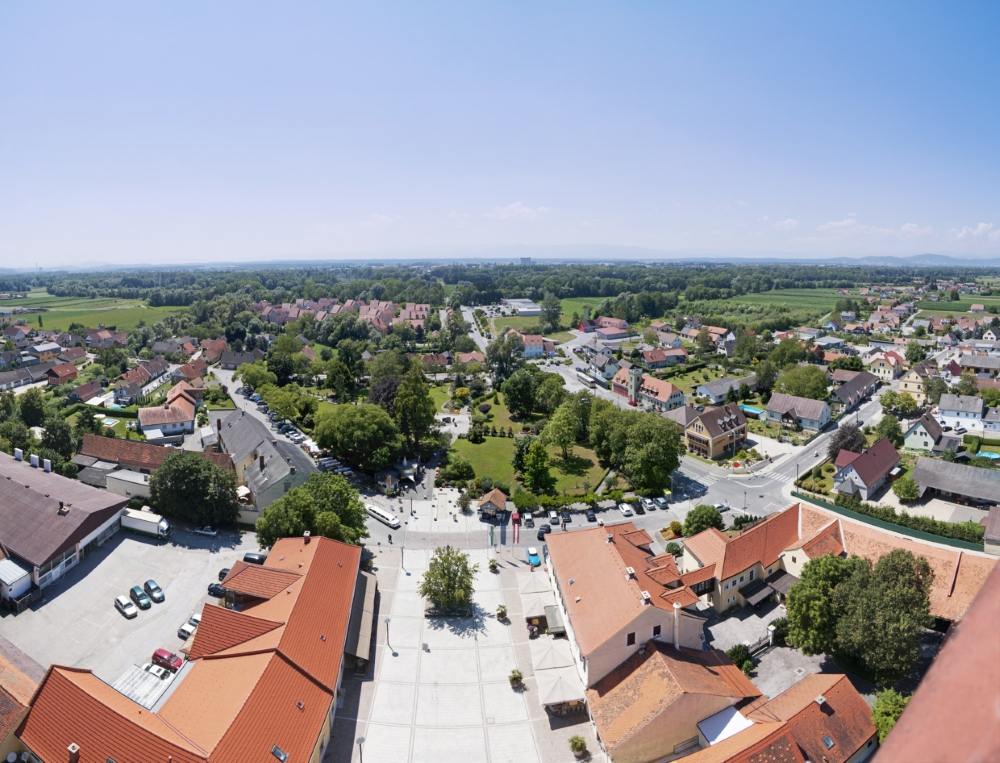
- View of Fernitz

- Coat of arms

- Location within Austria
- Coordinates: 46°58′27″N 15°29′54″E
- Country: Austria
- State: Styria
- District: Graz-Umgebung

Government
  - Mayor: Robert Winkler

Area
  - Total: 20.54 km^{2} (7.93 sq mi)

Population (2020-01-01)
  - Total: 4,870
  - Density: 237/km^{2} (614/sq mi)
- Time zone: UTC+1 (CET)
  - Summer (DST): UTC+2 (CEST)
- Postal code: 8072, 8410
- Area code: 03135
- Website: www.fernitz-mellach.gv.at

Fernitz-Mellach is since 2015 a municipality with 4,654 residents (as of 1 January 2016) in Styria, Austria. It lies in the south of Graz-Umgebung District. The municipality was founded as part of the Styria municipal structural reform, at the end of 2014, by merging the former towns Fernitz and Mellach.

== Geography ==
=== Geographical layout ===
Fernitz-Mellach is located in the south part of the Graz-Umgebung District, about 10 kilometres (6.2 mi) south of Graz. The municipality runs along the Mur River.

=== Municipality arrangement ===
The municipality territory includes the following five sections (population as of 1 January 2015):

- Dillach (365)
- Enzelsdorf (294)
- Fernitz (2954)
- Gnaning (402)
- Mellach (595)

and consists of the Katastralgemeinden Fernitz, Gnaning and Mellach.

== History ==
The municipality was founded on 1 January 2015 by merger of the municipality areas of Fernitz and Mellach.
