= Amlach =

- Municipality
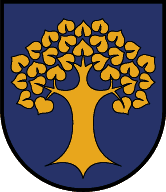
- Coat of arms

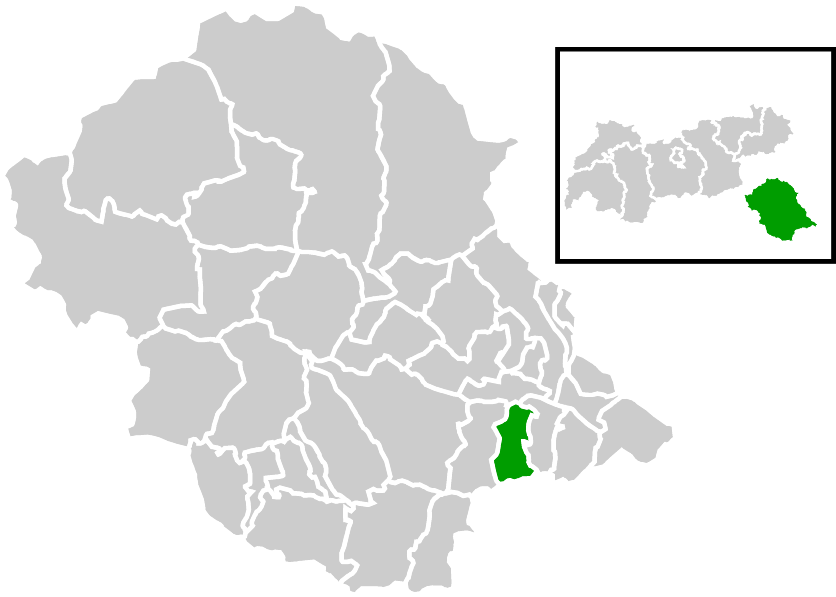
- Location within Lienz district

- Location within Austria
- Coordinates: 46°48′48″N 12°45′40″E
- Country: Austria
- State: Tyrol
- District: Lienz

Government
  - Mayor: Stefan Clara

Area
  - Total: 22.49 km^{2} (8.68 sq mi)
- Elevation: 689 m (2,260 ft)

Population (2021)
  - Total: 492
  - Density: 21.9/km^{2} (56.7/sq mi)
- Time zone: UTC+1 (CET)
  - Summer (DST): UTC+2 (CEST)
- Postal code: 9900
- Area code: 04852
- Vehicle registration: LZ
- Website: www.amlach.net

Amlach is a municipality in the district of Lienz in the Austrian state of Tyrol.

== Population ==
Historical population
Year	Pop.	±%
1869	173	—
1880	163	−5.8%
1890	179	+9.8%
1900	152	−15.1%
1910	146	−3.9%
1923	180	+23.3%
1934	172	−4.4%
1939	200	+16.3%
1951	204	+2.0%
1961	200	−2.0%
1971	232	+16.0%
1981	236	+1.7%
1991	261	+10.6%
2001	324	+24.1%
2011	378	+16.7%
