= Zillertal Arena =

Ski resort in Tyrol, Austria

Coordinates: 47°15′33.5″N 12°0′7″E

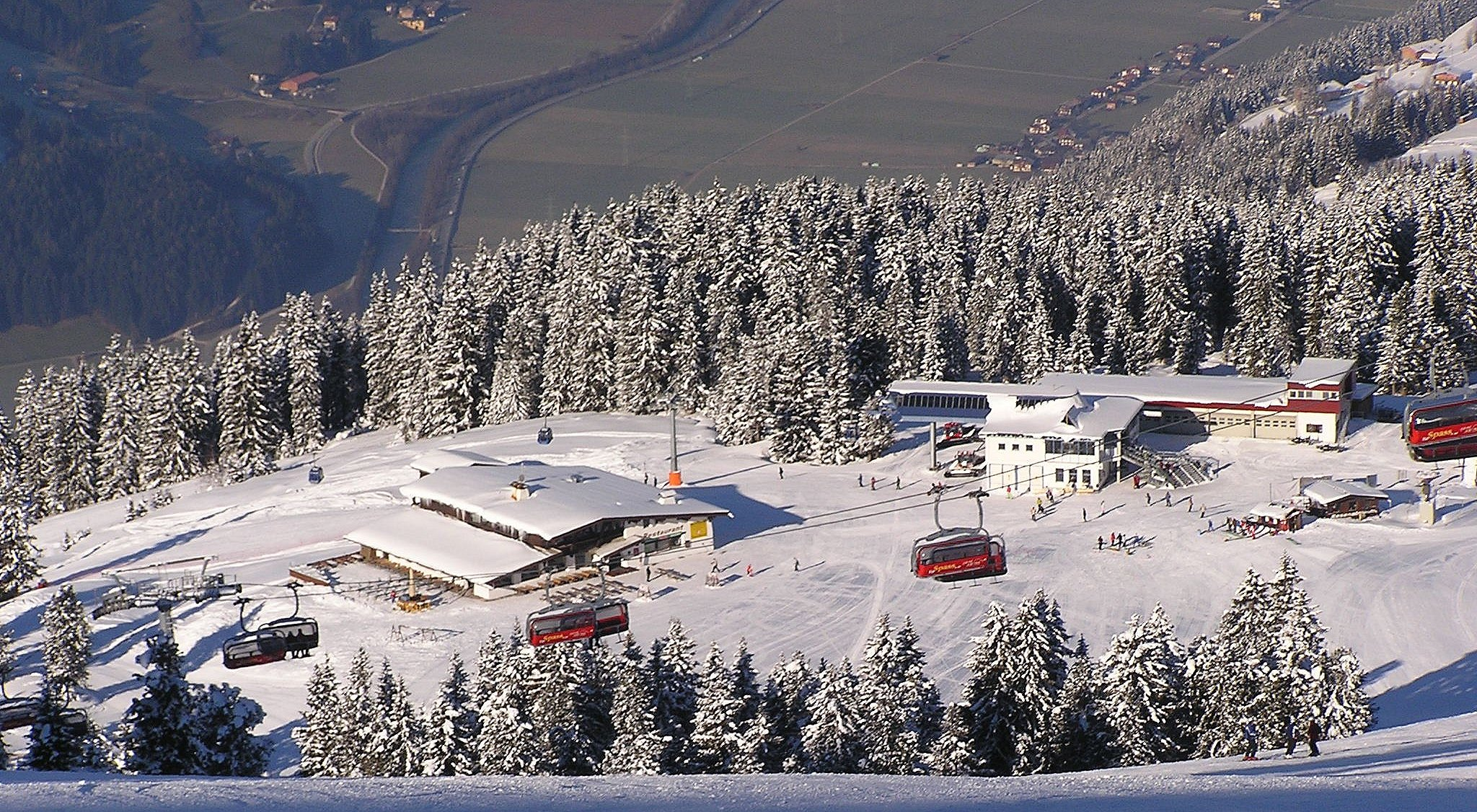
View of the top station near the Rosenalm

The Zillertal Arena is a major year-round alpine resort spanning two federal states (Tyrol and Salzburg) and covering the villages of Zell am Ziller, Gerlos, Königsleiten, and Hochkrimml. In winter, around 150 kilometres of slopes and approximately 52 lifts are available, with the highest terrain reaching up to 2,500 metres above sea level. In summer, the Arena offers a wide range of leisure activities, adventure worlds, and family-friendly attractions. Its topographical location and broad range of offers make the Zillertal Arena one of Austria's most popular tourist regions. Independent review platforms particularly highlight its snow reliability and environmental friendliness.

Winter offers

The Zillertal Arena is considered the largest interconnected ski area in the Zillertal Valley. It stretches from Zell am Ziller in Tyrol to Hochkrimml in Salzburg's Pinzgau region and offers a total of around 150 kilometres of slopes and 52 lifts with a transport capacity of approximately 85,000 people per hour.

== Gallery ==
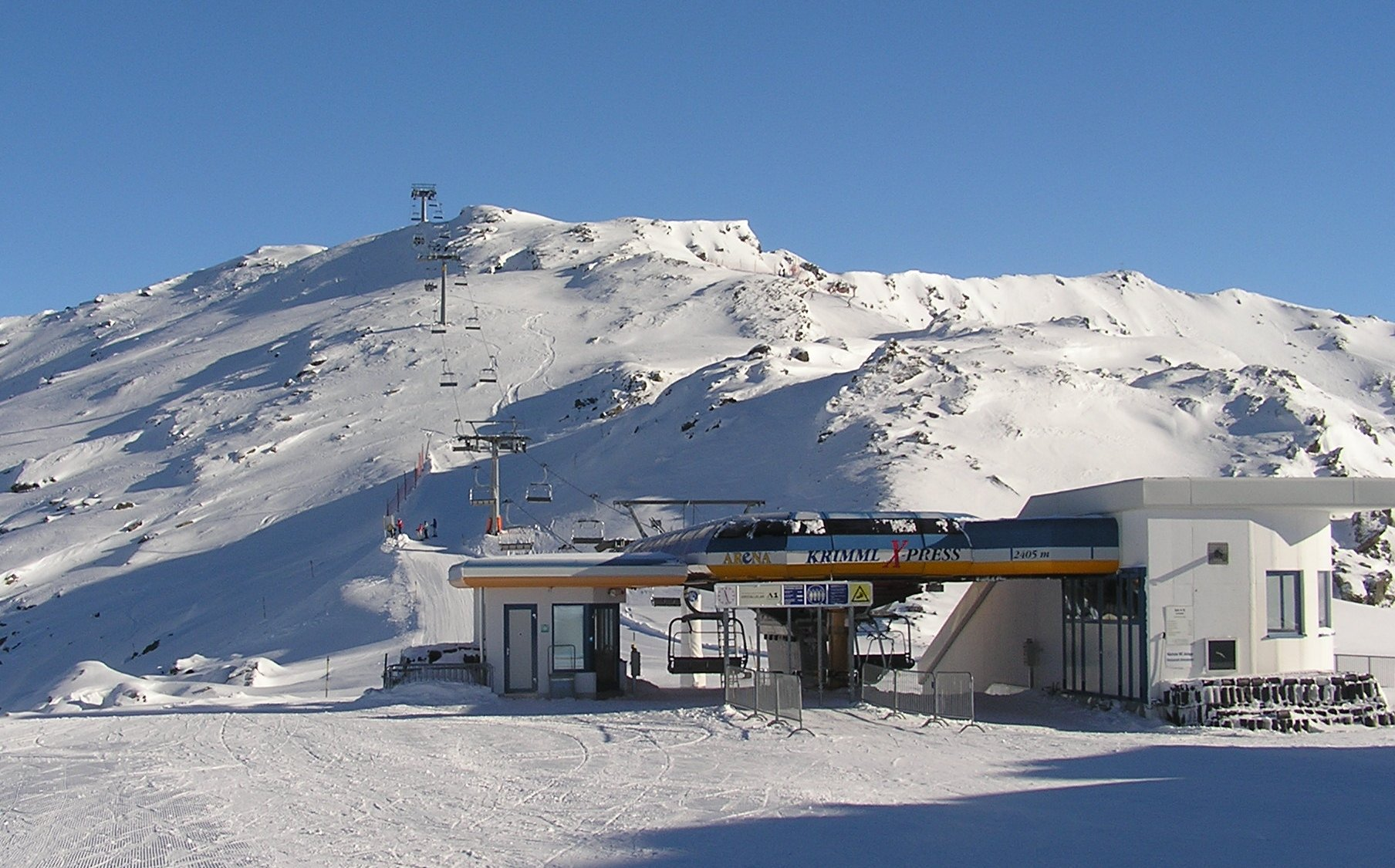
The western exit of the Krimml Express

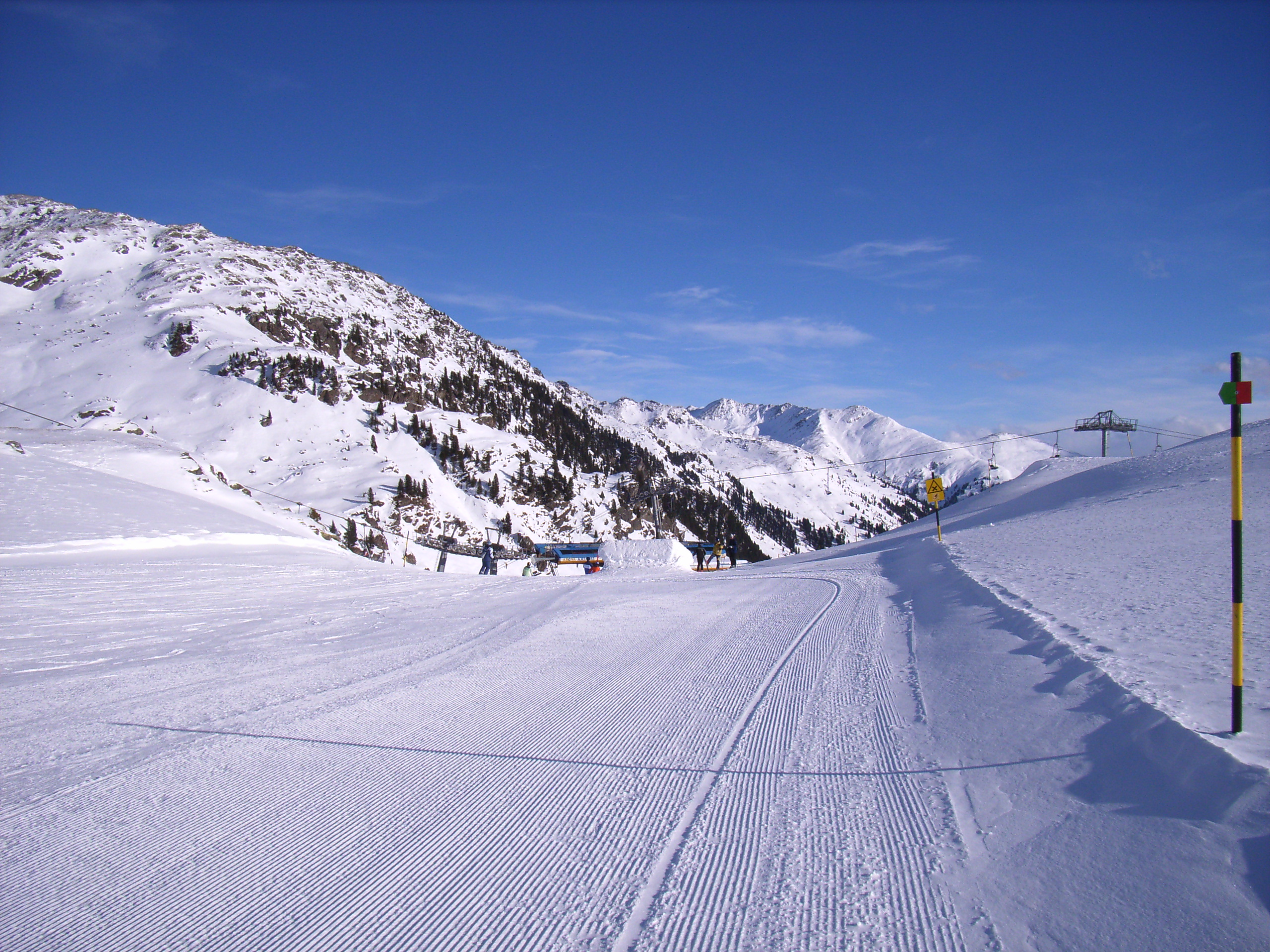
The Zillertal Arena, a little north of the Krimmlalm

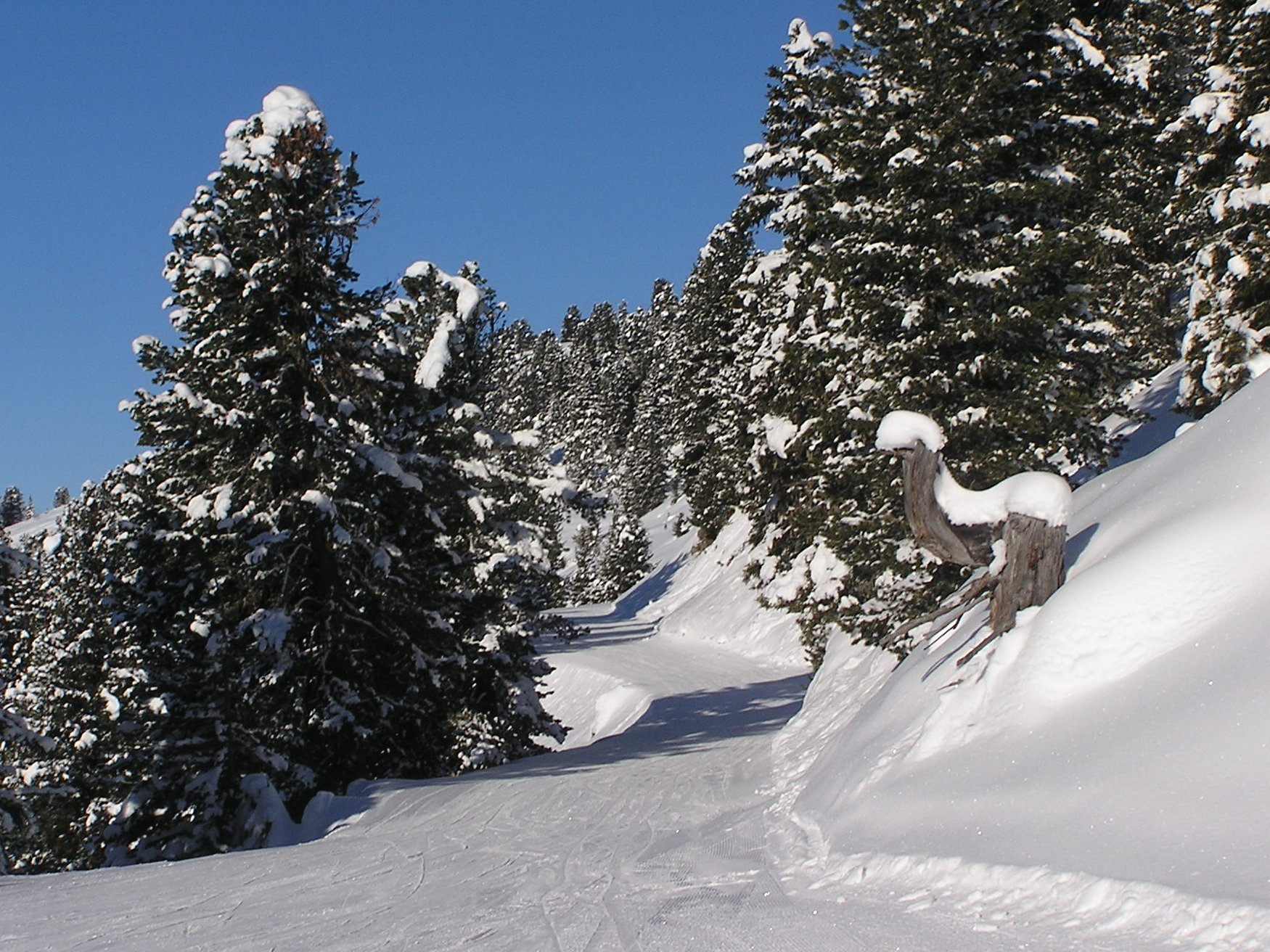
A run (Ziehweg) in the southern part of the Zillertal Arena

== Literature ==
- Freytag & Berndt-Verlag Wien, Wanderkarte 1:50.000, Blatt WK 151, Zillertal, Tuxer Alpen, Jenbach-Schwaz. ISBN 978-3-85084-751-3
