= NORC (web service) =

Street view website

- Initial release: 2009
- Available in: English, Romanian, Russian

NORC was a street view website introduced in 2009 for Central and Eastern Europe. The site provided 360-degree panoramas from various cities and locations in Austria, Czech Republic, Hungary, Poland, Romania, Russia, and Slovakia. It is owned by a software company eXtreme Soft Group, headquartered in Bucharest, Romania.

The sites seems to be down since early November 2013.

== Areas included ==
Country	Locations	Site	References
Austria	Vienna, Innsbruck, Bregenz, Dornbirn, Bludenz, Axams, Absam, Ampass, Mieders, Fulpmes, Völs, Götzens, Natters, Mutters, Igls, Aldrans, Baumkirchen, Volders, Fritzens, Rum, Hall in Tirol, Absam, Thaur, Mils, Wattens, Telfes, Neustift im Stubaital, Seefeld, Reith bei Seefeld, Leutasch, Scharnitz, Arzl im Pitztal, Jerzens, Längenfeld, Mieming, Mötz, Obsteig, Oetz, Roppen, Sankt Leonhard im Pitztal, Sautens, Sölden, Umhausen, Wenns, Faggen, Fließ, Flirsch, Galtür, Grins, Ischgl, Kappl, Kaunerberg, Kaunertal, Kauns, Pettneu am Arlberg, Pfunds, Pians, Prutz, Ried im Oberinntal, Sankt Anton am Arlberg, See, Strengen, Tobadill, Tösens, Schruns, Bartholomäberg, Blons, Bludesch, Brand, Bürs, Bürserberg, Dalaas, Fontanella, Gaschurn, Innerbraz, Klösterle, Lech am Arlberg, Lorüns, Ludesch, Nüziders, Raggal, Sankt Anton im Montafon, Sankt Gallenkirch, Sankt Gerold, Silbertal, Sonntag, Stallehr, Thüringen, Thüringerberg, Tschagguns, Vandans, Zürs, Hohenems, Lustenau, Götzis, Altach, Bildstein, Schwarzach, Kennelbach, Hard, Lauterach, Wolfurt, Pill, Weer, Strass im Zillertal, Wiesing, Eben am Achensee, Bruck am Ziller, Aschau im Zillertal, Ried im Zillertal, Hart im Zillertal, Stumm, Fügen, Fügenberg, Uderns, Ramsau im Zillertal, Mayrhofen, Finkenberg, Schwendau,	www.norc.at	
Czech Republic	Prague, Brno, Plzeň, Olomouc, Ostrava	www.norc.cz	
Hungary	Budapest, Debrecen, Miskolc, Szeged, Győr, Lake Balaton Area, Szentendre, Hajdúszoboszló	www.norc.hu	
Poland	Warsaw, Kraków area, Poznań, Wrocław, Katowice area	www.norc.pl	
Romania	București, Arad, Azuga, Bacău, Baia Mare, Brăila, Brașov, Breaza, Bușteni, Buzău, Câmpina, Călărași, Cluj-Napoca, Constanța, Costinești, Craiova, Eforie Sud, Eforie Nord, Galați, Giurgiu, Iași, Mangalia, Miercurea Ciuc, Oradea, Pitești, Ploiești, Poiana Brașov, Predeal, Râmnicu Vâlcea, Râmnicu Sărat, Satu Mare, Sfântu Gheorghe, Sibiu, Sighișoara, Sinaia, Suceava, Târgoviște, Târgu Mureș, Timișoara, Tulcea, Vaslui and Romanian Black Sea resorts 2 Mai, Cap Aurora, Jupiter, Mamaia, Năvodari, Neptun, Olimp, Saturn, Vama Veche, Venus	www.norc.ro	
Russia	Moscow	www.mappi.ru	
Slovakia	Bratislava, Banská Bystrica, Košice, Nitra, Trnava, Žilina	www.norc.sk	

== Updates and new data ==
Currently there is no data from Norc about when and/or where updates will be available. The latest new panoramas were published in September 2009, showing cities mostly linked with ski resorts in Austrian lands of Tirol, Vorarlberg and Salzburg. In January 2011 the street view service for Russia was discontinued. Whether this is temporary or permanent, Norc Russia, operated by the name mappi.ru, does not specify.
