= Rohrberg =

Rohrberg may refer to:

== Places ==
- Rohrberg, Austria, a municipality in Zillertal, Schwaz district in Tyrol, Austria
- Rohrberg, Saxony-Anhalt, a municipality in the Altmarkkreis Salzwedel district, Saxony-Anhalt, Germany
- Rohrberg, Thuringia, a municipality in the Eichsfeld district, Thuringia, Germany
- Rohrberg (Habichtswald), a hill in Hesse, Germany

== People ==
- Sebastian Rohrberg, a German archer
