= Gilfert =

Northernmost peak of Rastkogel Massif, Tux Alps, Tyrol, Austria

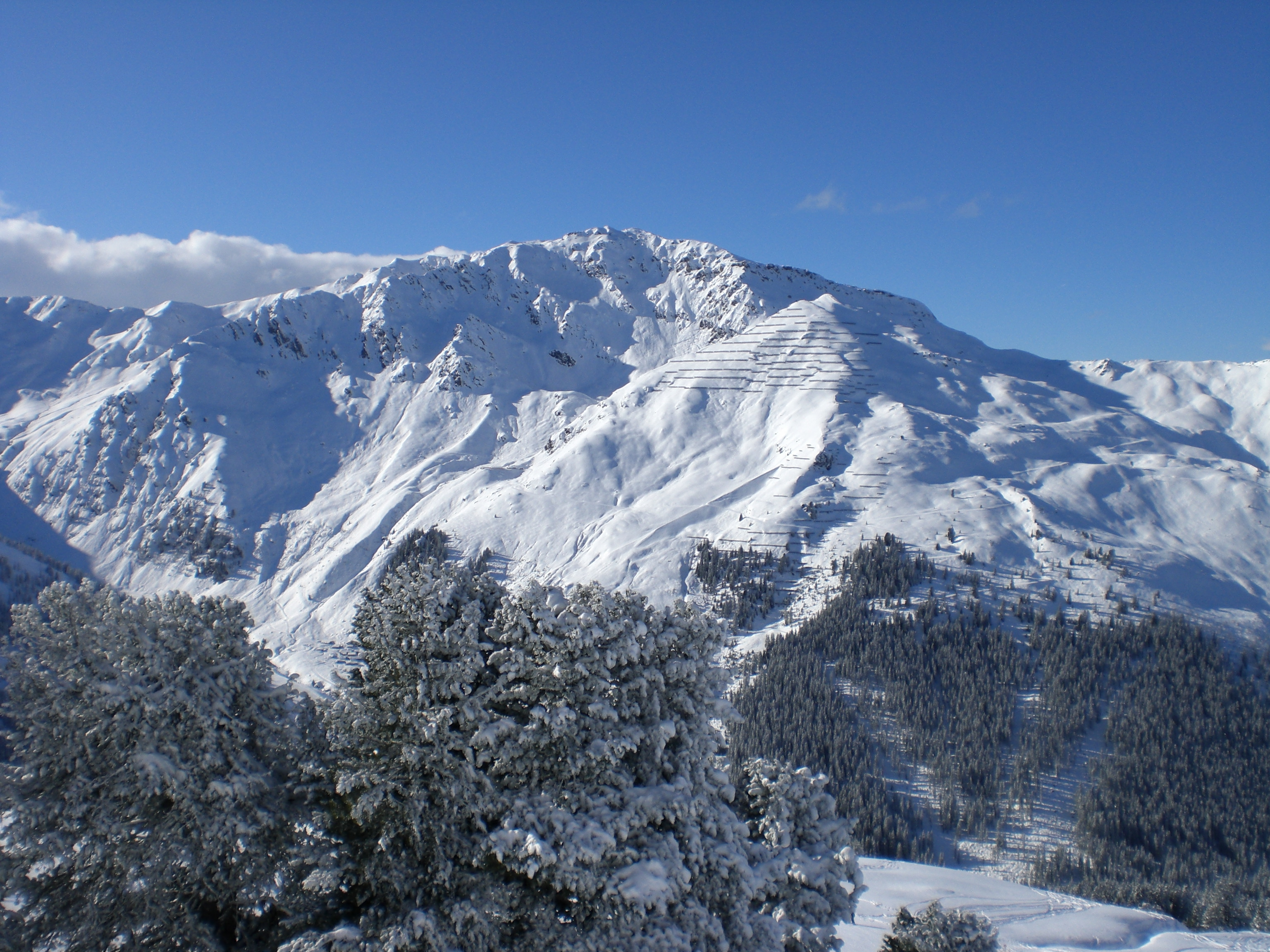
- The Gilfert seen from the Holzalm to the east. Foreground: the Sonntagsköpfl.

Highest point
- Elevation: 2,506 m (AA) (8,222 ft)
- Coordinates: 47°16′13″N 11°44′35″E

Geography
- Location within Austria
- Location: Tyrol, Austria
- Parent range: Tux Alps

Climbing
- Easiest route: Easy walk or ski tour

The Gilfert is a 2,506-metre-high (8,222 ft) peak in the Tux Alps. It is the most northerly extent of the Rastkogel Massif and can therefore be seen from almost anywhere in the Lower Inn Valley.

== Location and countryside ==
The summit bears a large cross, as do the two northwesterly subpeaks (Wetterkreuz) and the northeasterly Sonntagsköpfl (2,244 m). Hollowed out of its eastern flank is Das Kar, a nearly three-quarters enclosed rock basin (Felskessel). It is drained by the Lamarkbach stream into the lower Zillertal valley.

Although the massif of Gilfert-Rastkogel has a very distinctive ridge with many branches, the rock faces are mainly oriented in a north-south direction. This geological feature gives the heavily divided mountain group its own character.

== Paths ==
The summit of the Gilfert is easily climbed from Innerst near Weerberg (south side of the Inn valley) via the Nonsalm (1,785 m). The route from Innerst to Nonsalm can be climbed as a ski tour or with snow shoes in the winter and spring, because the route is relatively safe from avalanches. A second route runs almost parallel to it from Pill or the district town of Schwaz up to the summit.

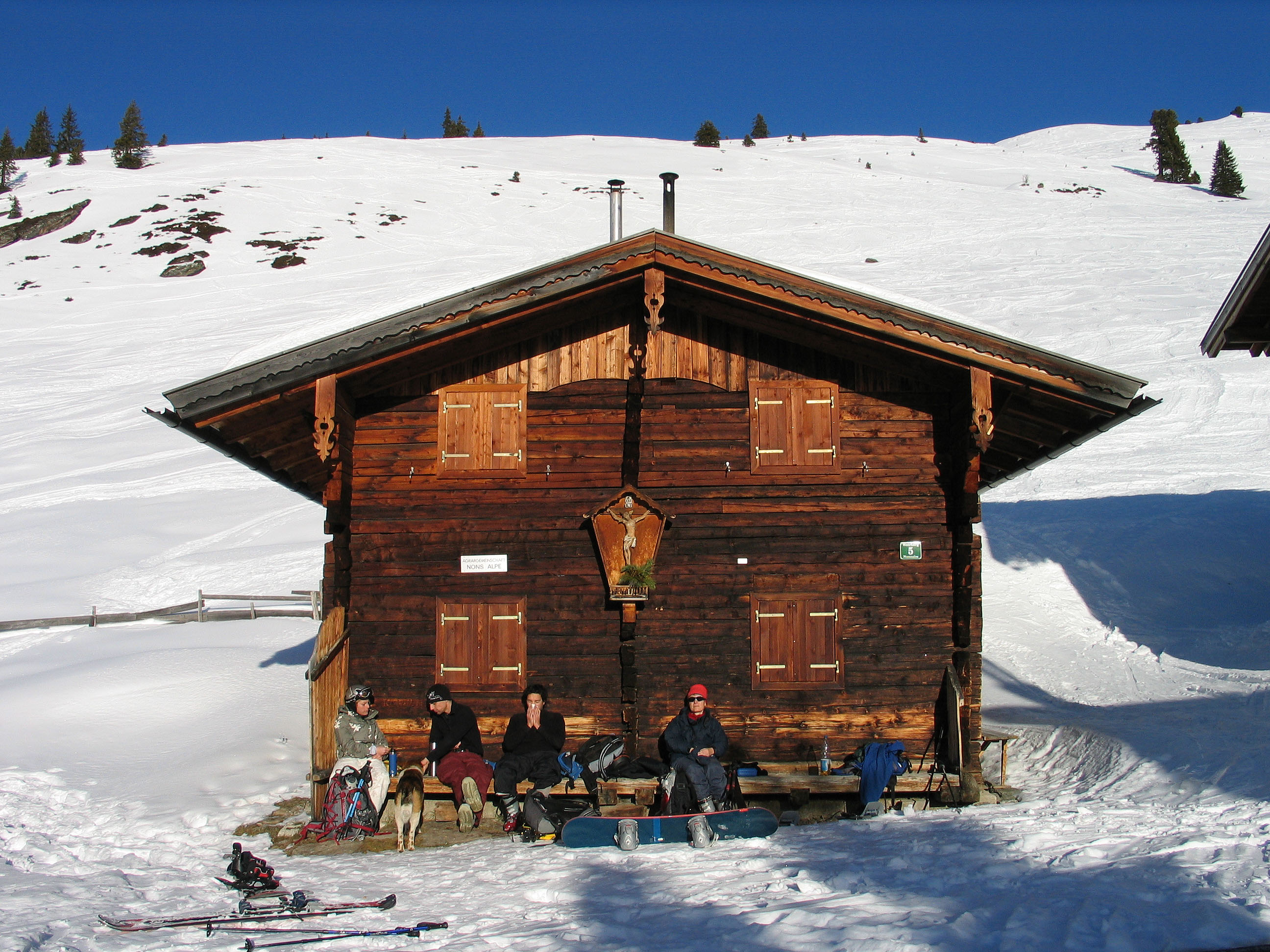
Nonsalm am Gilfert

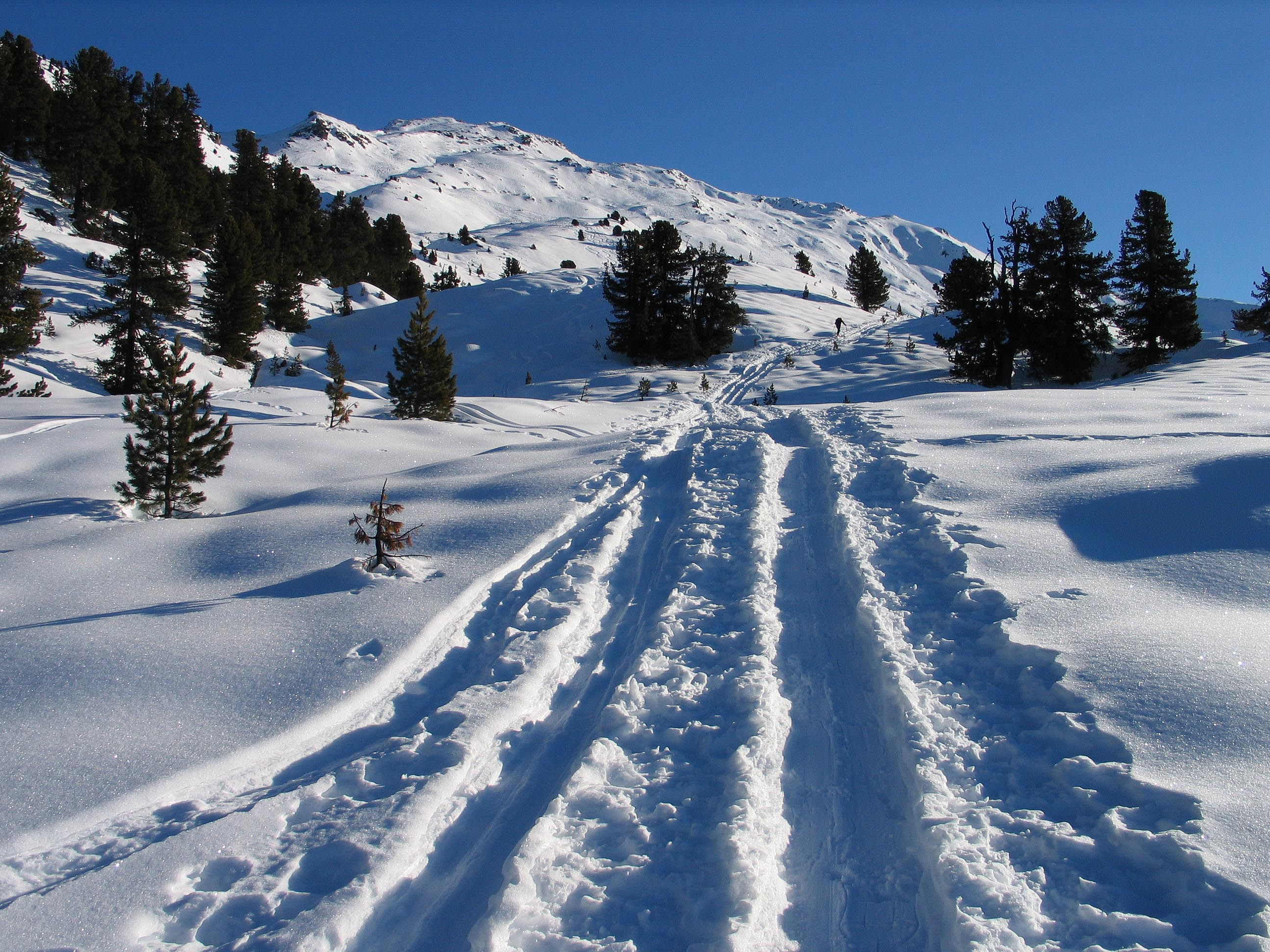
Ski ascent of the Gilfert in December

== Ski region versus nature reserve ==
For many years discussions have taken place over whether to develop the Gilfert as a ski region, or designate it as a nature reserve. On the one hand, it has been envisaged for a long while to create a Gilfert-Rastkogel reserve (Ruhegebiet). On the other hand, the Inn valley municipalities around Weer have striven to provide access to the Hochfügen-Hochzillertal ski region, whose facilities would extend to the ridge. A regional planning policy decision about the future of the Central Alps around Hintertux is pending.

== See also ==
- Kellerjoch
- Pangert
