= Fügenberg =

- Municipality
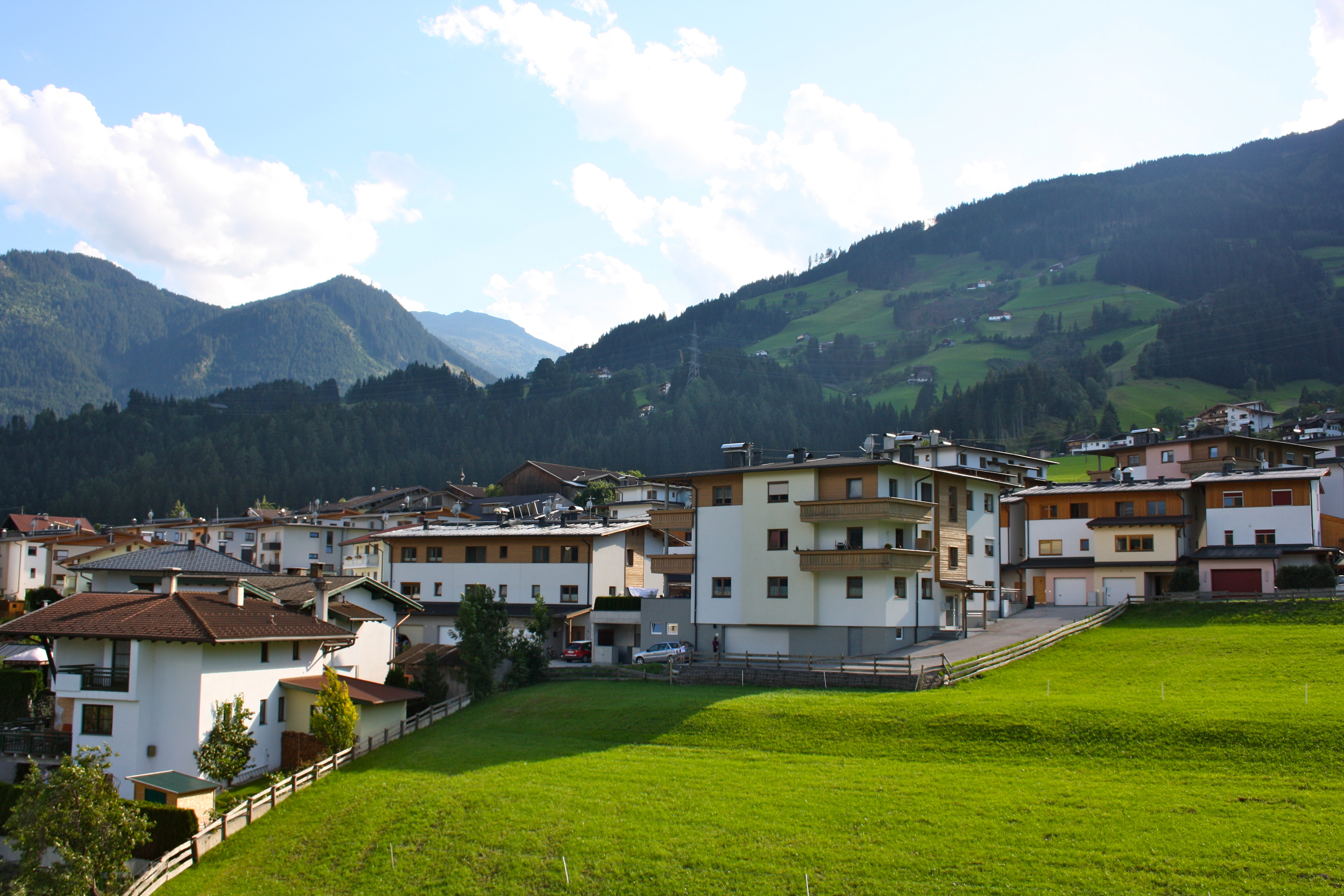

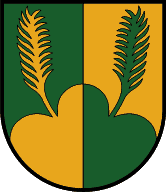
- Coat of arms

- Location within Austria
- Coordinates: 47°21′00″N 11°49′00″E
- Country: Austria
- State: Tyrol
- District: Schwaz

Government
  - Mayor: Matthias Hauser

Area
  - Total: 58.55 km^{2} (22.61 sq mi)
- Elevation: 681 m (2,234 ft)

Population (2021)
  - Total: 1,436
  - Density: 24.53/km^{2} (63.52/sq mi)
- Time zone: UTC+1 (CET)
  - Summer (DST): UTC+2 (CEST)
- Postal code: 6263
- Area code: 05288
- Vehicle registration: SZ
- Website: www.fuegenberg.tirol.gv.at

Fügenberg is a municipality in the Schwaz district in the Austrian state of Tyrol.

== Tourism ==
St. Pancras Church, built from 1494 to 1497 in the Gothic style, is worth visiting. The Fügen-Fügenberg Region has two ski regions: the Spieljoch and Hochfügen. Besides its importance as a winter sport centre, Hochfügen is also the base for numerous mountain hikes, for example, to the 2,506 m high Gilfert or the 2,762 m high Rastkogel.

It has two ski areas.
