= Gerlosberg =

- Municipality
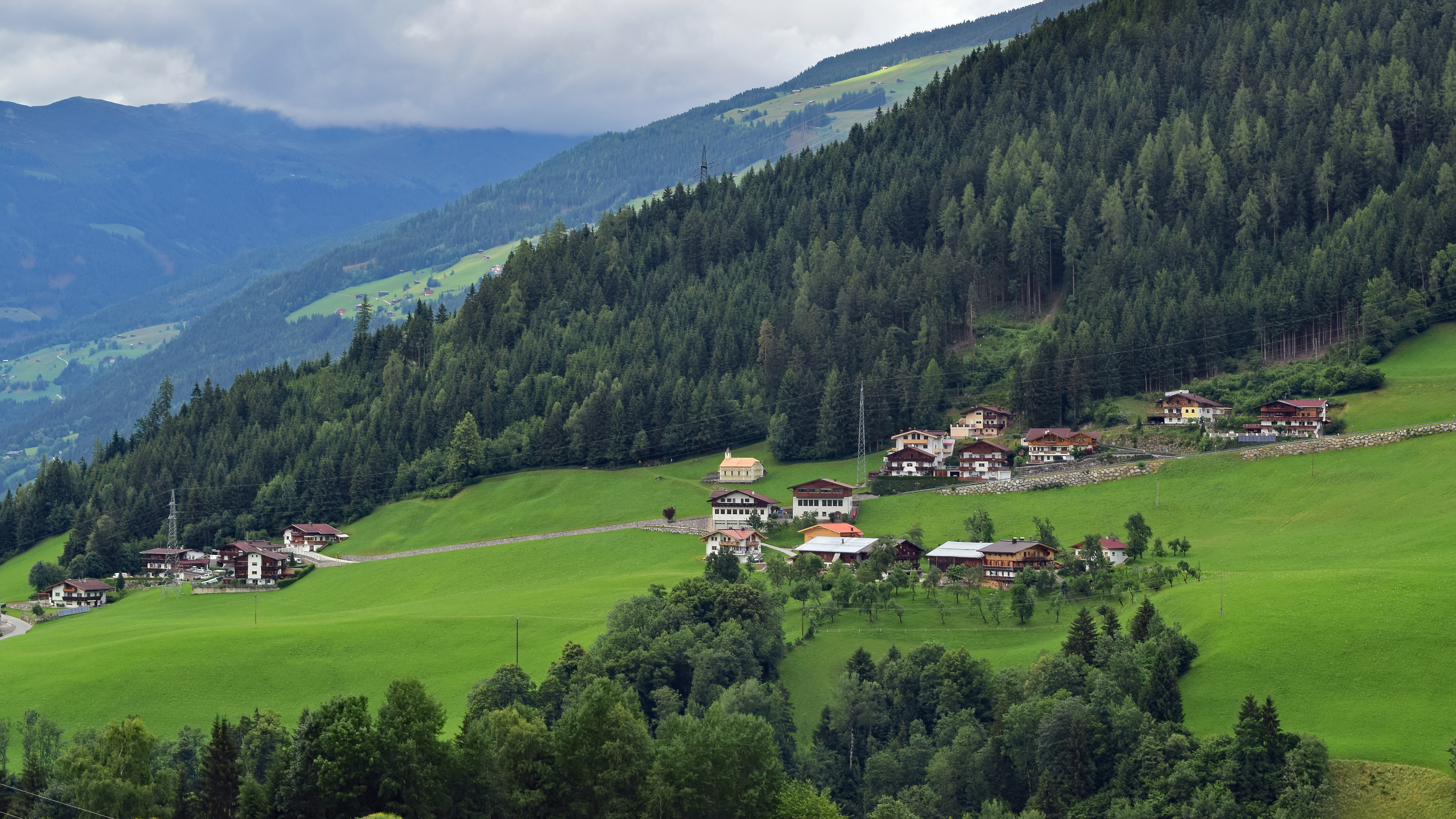
- View of Gerlosberg

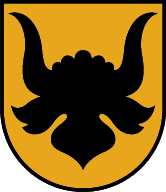
- Coat of arms

- Location within Austria
- Coordinates: 47°13′00″N 11°55′00″E
- Country: Austria
- State: Tyrol
- District: Schwaz

Government
  - Mayor: Josef Kerschdorfer

Area
  - Total: 16.2 km^{2} (6.3 sq mi)
- Elevation: 1,050 m (3,440 ft)

Population (2021)
  - Total: 472
  - Density: 29.1/km^{2} (75.5/sq mi)
- Time zone: UTC+1 (CET)
  - Summer (DST): UTC+2 (CEST)
- Postal code: 6280
- Area code: 05282
- Vehicle registration: SZ
- Website: www.riskommunal.net/ gerlosberg

Gerlosberg is a municipality in the Schwaz district in the Austrian state of Tyrol.

== Geography ==
Gerlosberg lies east of Rohrberg. In the southern part of the municipality, the Gerlos brook flows through a deep gorge. In the north, the elevation rises to the 2558 meter Kreuzjoch.
