= Kaltenbach, Austria =

Kaltenbach
- Municipality
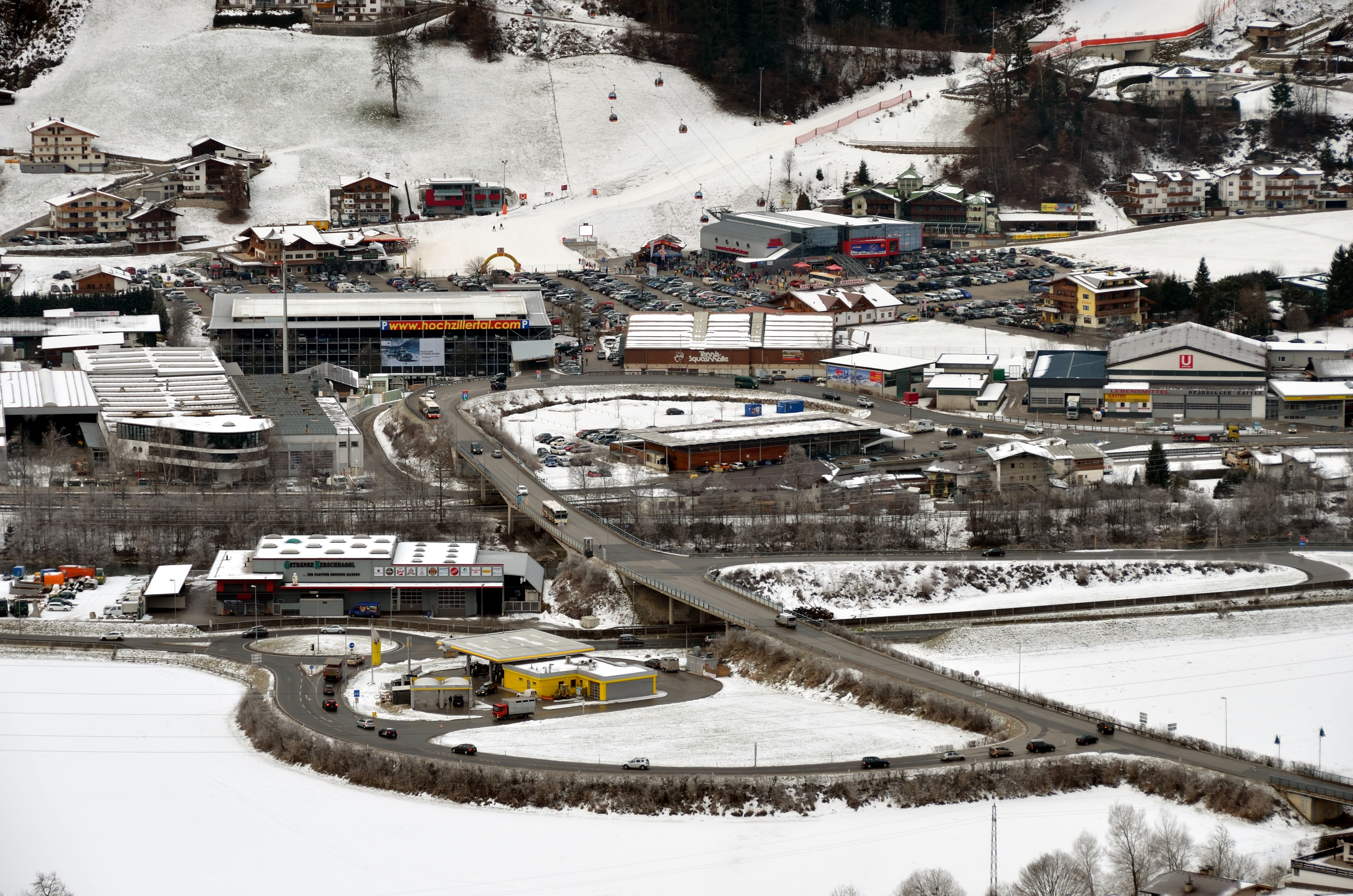

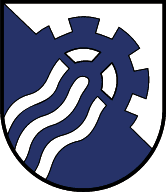
- Coat of arms

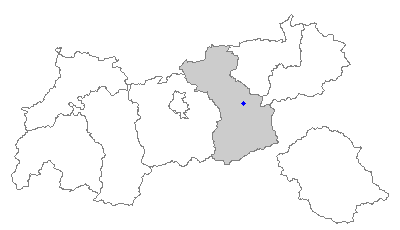
- Location of Kaltenbach within Tyrol

- Location within Austria
- Coordinates: 47°16′00″N 11°52′00″E
- Country: Austria
- State: Tyrol
- District: Schwaz

Government
  - Mayor: Klaus Gasteiger

Area
  - Total: 12.13 km^{2} (4.68 sq mi)
- Elevation: 558 m (1,831 ft)

Population (2021)
  - Total: 1,319
  - Density: 108.7/km^{2} (281.6/sq mi)
- Time zone: UTC+1 (CET)
  - Summer (DST): UTC+2 (CEST)
- Postal code: 6272
- Area code: 05283
- Vehicle registration: SZ
- Website: www.kaltenbach. tirol.gv.at

Kaltenbach is a municipality in the Schwaz district in the Austrian state of Tyrol.

== Geography ==
Kaltenbach lies in the central Ziller valley on the left bank of the Ziller, across from Stumm.
