= Gallzein =

- Municipality
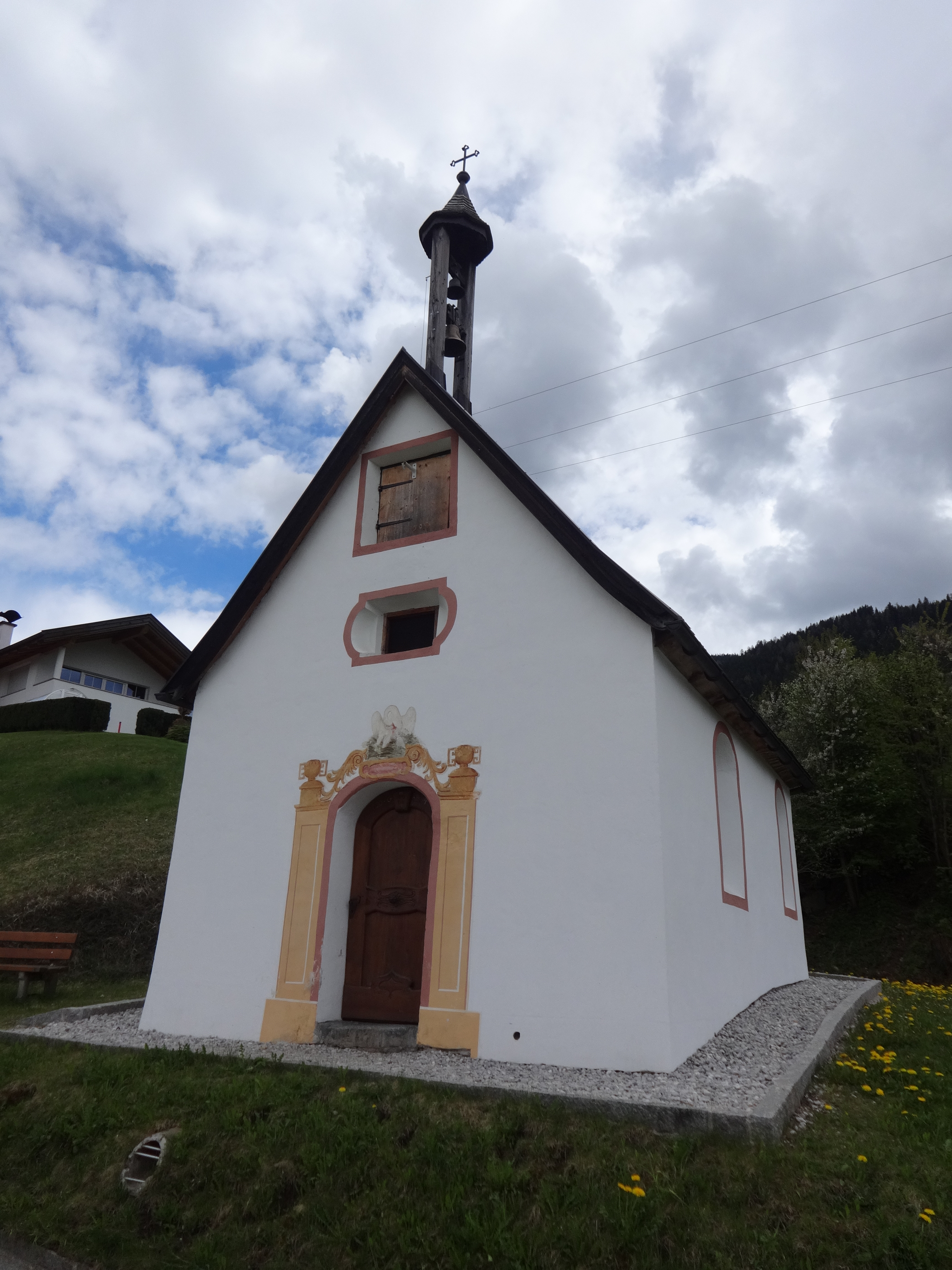
- Kobald Chapel in Hochgallzein (part of Gallzein)

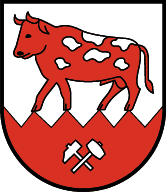
- Coat of arms

- Location within Austria
- Coordinates: 47°22′00″N 11°46′00″E
- Country: Austria
- State: Tyrol
- District: Schwaz

Government
  - Mayor: Josef Brunner

Area
  - Total: 10.68 km^{2} (4.12 sq mi)
- Elevation: 825 m (2,707 ft)

Population (2018-01-01)
  - Total: 668
  - Density: 62.5/km^{2} (162/sq mi)
- Time zone: UTC+1 (CET)
  - Summer (DST): UTC+2 (CEST)
- Postal code: 6222
- Area code: 05244
- Vehicle registration: SZ
- Website: www.gallzein.tirol.gv.at

Gallzein is a municipality in the Schwaz district in the Austrian state of Tyrol.

== Geography ==
Gallzein lies on a terrace of the Lower Inn Valley in the foothills of the Alps.
