= NORC =

NORC may refer to:

== Organizations ==
- NORC (web service), a street view web service and company based in Romania
- Guerrilla Army of the Poor, which went by the acronym NORC in its beginnings
- National Opinion Research Center (NORC) at the University of Chicago

== Places ==
- Naturally occurring retirement community
- Northern Rim Countries (Canada, Denmark, Iceland, Norway, Russia and the United States, sometimes including Finland and Sweden)

== Science and technology ==
- norC, gene coding for the small subunit of nitric oxide reductase
- IBM NORC (Naval Ordnance Research Calculator) computer
