= Stummerberg =

- Municipality
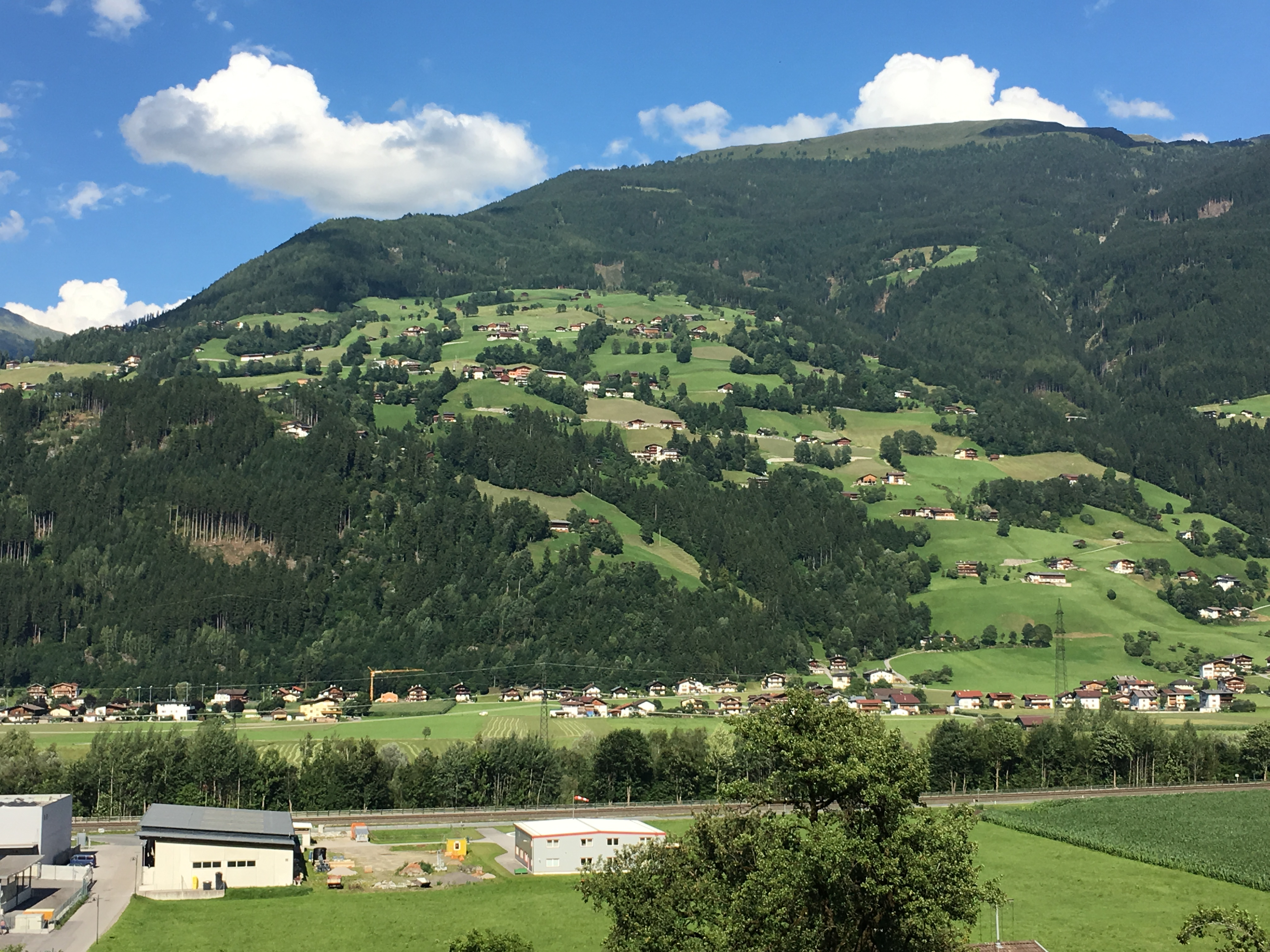
- View of Stummerberg

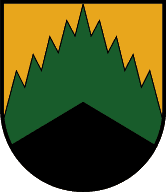
- Coat of arms

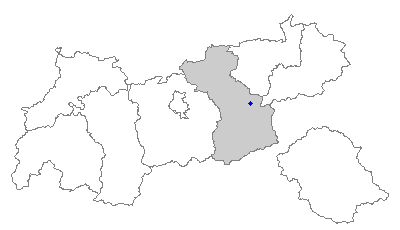
- Location within Tyrol

- Location within Austria
- Coordinates: 47°16′00″N 11°55′00″E
- Country: Austria
- State: Tyrol
- District: Schwaz

Government
  - Mayor: Georg Danzl

Area
  - Total: 56.74 km^{2} (21.91 sq mi)
- Elevation: 800 m (2,600 ft)

Population (2018-01-01)
  - Total: 844
  - Density: 14.9/km^{2} (38.5/sq mi)
- Time zone: UTC+1 (CET)
  - Summer (DST): UTC+2 (CEST)
- Postal code: 6276
- Area code: 05283
- Vehicle registration: SZ
- Website: www.stummerberg. tirol.gv.at

Stummerberg is a municipality in the Schwaz district in the Austrian state of Tyrol.

== Geography ==
Stummerberg lies in the central Ziller valley above Stumm.
