= Uderns =

- Municipality
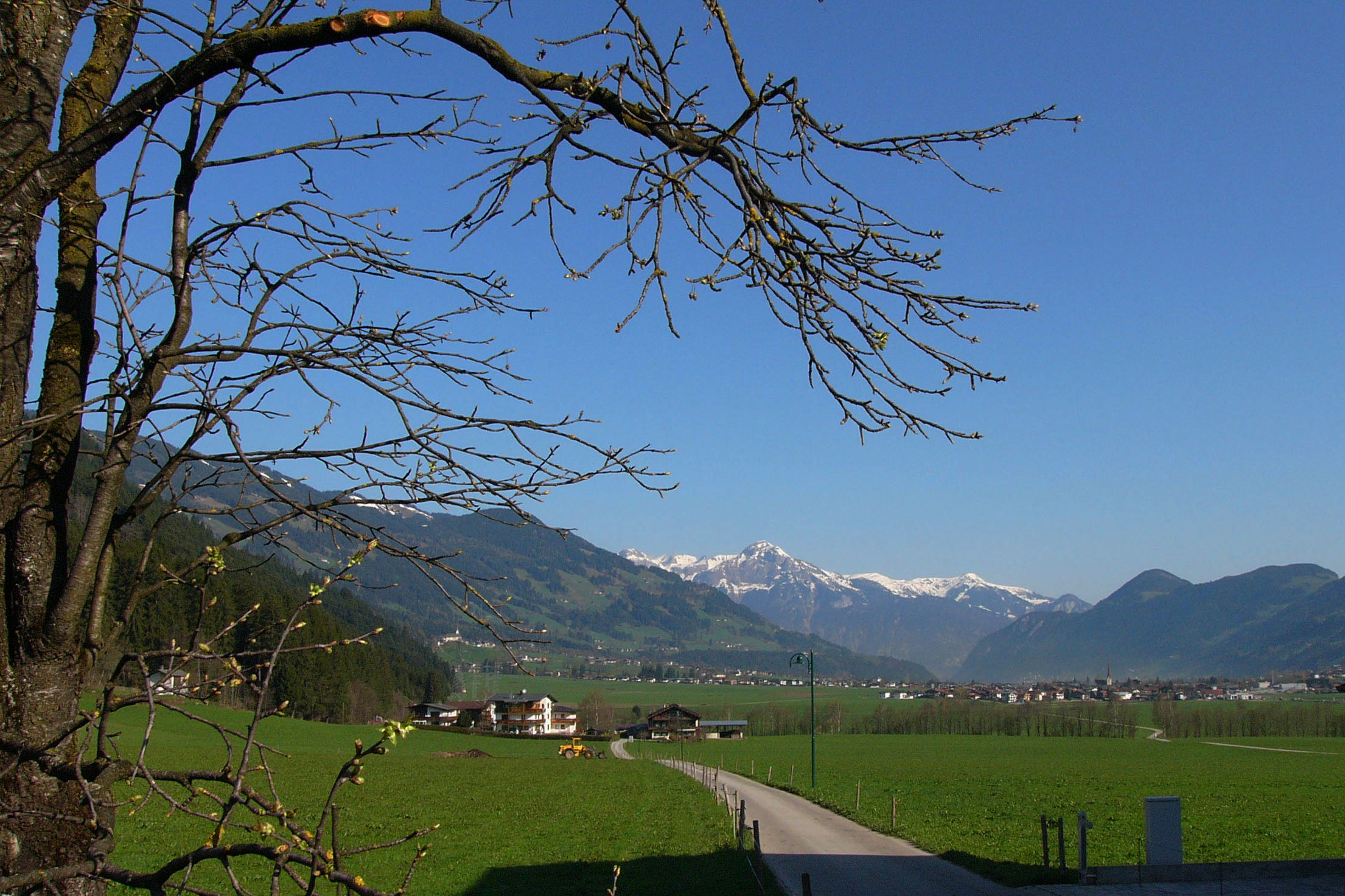

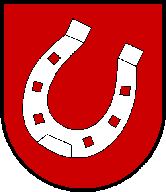
- Coat of arms

- Location within Austria
- Coordinates: 47°19′37″N 11°51′53″E
- Country: Austria
- State: Tyrol
- District: Schwaz

Government
  - Mayor: Josef Bucher

Area
  - Total: 6.72 km^{2} (2.59 sq mi)
- Elevation: 549 m (1,801 ft)

Population (2018-01-01)
  - Total: 1,845
  - Density: 275/km^{2} (711/sq mi)
- Time zone: UTC+1 (CET)
  - Summer (DST): UTC+2 (CEST)
- Postal code: 6271
- Area code: 05288
- Vehicle registration: SZ
- Website: www.gemeinde. uderns.at

Uderns is a municipality in the Schwaz district in the Austrian state of Tyrol.

== Geography ==
Uderns lies between Fügen and Ried in the heart of the Ziller valley.
