= Brandberg =

Brandberg may refer to:

== Austria ==
- Brandberg, Austria, a municipality in the district of Schwaz, Tyrol, Austria

== Namibia ==
- Brandberg Constituency, the former name of Dâures Constituency in the Erongo region of Namibia
- Brandberg Massif, a dome-shaped plateau in the Namib Desert, Namibia
- Brandberg Mountain, in the Brandberg Massif, Namibia

== People ==
- Björn Brandberg (born 1986), Swedish curler
- Karl Gustaf Brandberg (1905–1997), Swedish Army lieutenant general
- Paulina Brandberg
