= Schwendau =

- Municipality
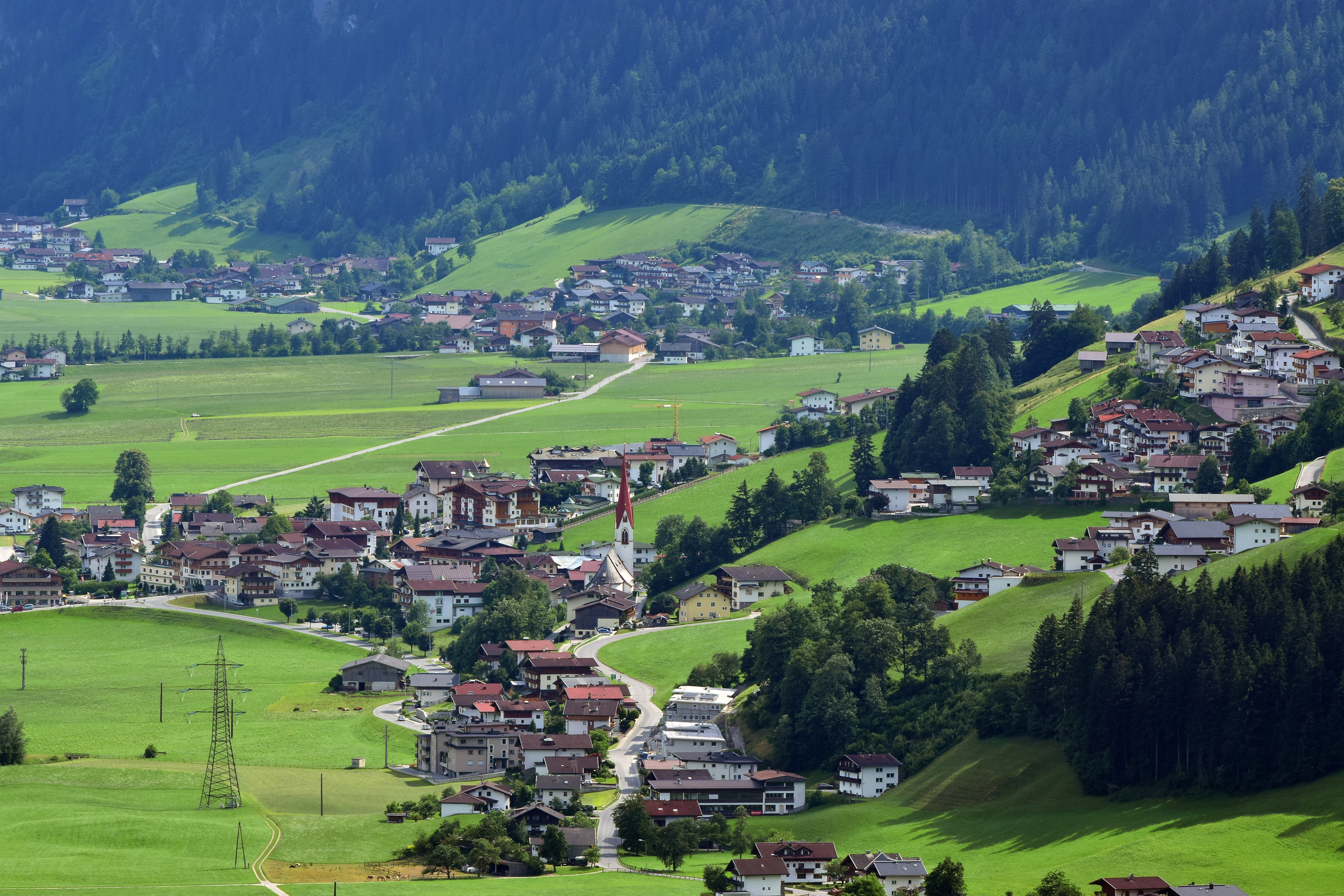
- View of Schwendau

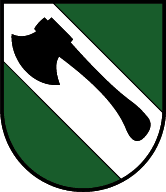
- Coat of arms

- Location within Austria
- Coordinates: 47°11′51″N 11°51′36″E
- Country: Austria
- State: Tyrol
- District: Schwaz

Government
  - Mayor: Franz Hauser

Area
  - Total: 17.36 km^{2} (6.70 sq mi)
- Elevation: 620 m (2,030 ft)

Population (2018-01-01)
  - Total: 1,725
  - Density: 99.37/km^{2} (257.4/sq mi)
- Time zone: UTC+1 (CET)
  - Summer (DST): UTC+2 (CEST)
- Postal code: 6283
- Area code: 05285 / 05282
- Vehicle registration: SZ
- Website: www.schwendau.at

Schwendau (Pronunciation:shven-dau) is a municipality and a village in the Schwaz district in the Austrian state of Tyrol. It was first mentioned in 1200 as “Swentowe” (clearing of a pasture). The original meaning of this name is also illustrated on the emblem of the village in the form of an axe.

== Geography ==
The municipal area comprises numerous component localities, including parts of Hippach, and extends from the River Ziller up to the 2,590 m high Hoarbergjoch pass. Schwendau is closely connected to the neighbouring village of Hippach and they also share several facilities.

== Family surname ==
The Schwendau family name traces its roots directly back to Schwendau. Family legend holds, the family name was originally Baron von Schwendau (Barons of Swanland) and they were the lowest form of royalty dubbed by Archduke Albert V the Magnanimous. The family responsibility would have been that of tax collectors and local sheriff. The Schwendau family believes their crest to be that of a defense weapon and not a tool.

There are less than 75 Schwendau family members living in North America.. Because so many girls have been born to the Schwendau family, it is believed the family will cease to exist in the next 100 years.

The family can trace its family tree back to Prussia in the 1700s and to Canada and America around 1850. The family crest dates back to the 1400s.
