= Buch in Tirol =

- Municipality
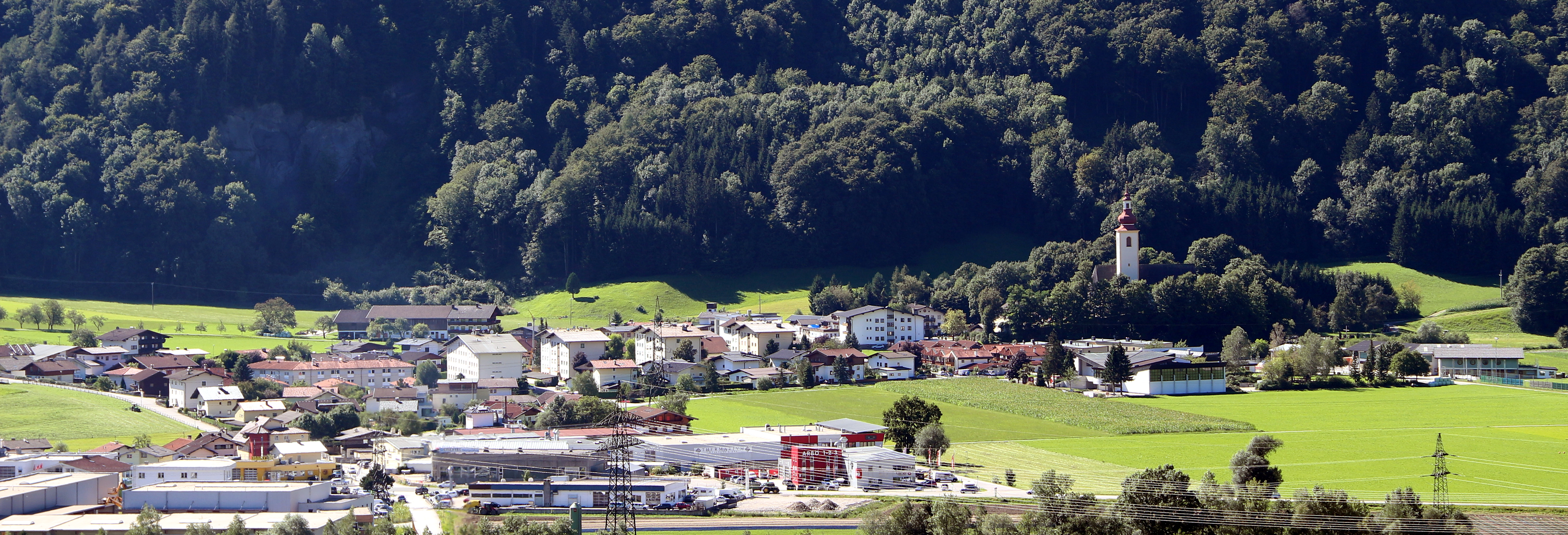

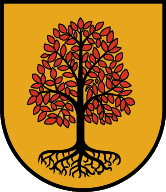
- Coat of arms

- Location within Austria
- Coordinates: 47°22′41″N 11°46′08″E
- Country: Austria
- State: Tyrol
- District: Schwaz

Government
  - Mayor: Otto Mauracher

Area
  - Total: 9.48 km^{2} (3.66 sq mi)
- Elevation: 545 m (1,788 ft)

Population (2018-01-01)
  - Total: 2,548
  - Density: 269/km^{2} (696/sq mi)
- Time zone: UTC+1 (CET)
  - Summer (DST): UTC+2 (CEST)
- Postal code: 6200
- Area code: 05244
- Vehicle registration: SZ
- Website: www.buch.tirol.gv.at

Buch in Tirol is a municipality in the Schwaz district in the Austrian state of Tyrol.

The name of the municipality was changed from Buch bei Jenbach in June 2010.

== Geography ==
Buch lies in the lower Inn valley south of the river.

== Notable people ==
Hans Köchler (born 1948), philosopher
