= Hart im Zillertal =

- Municipality
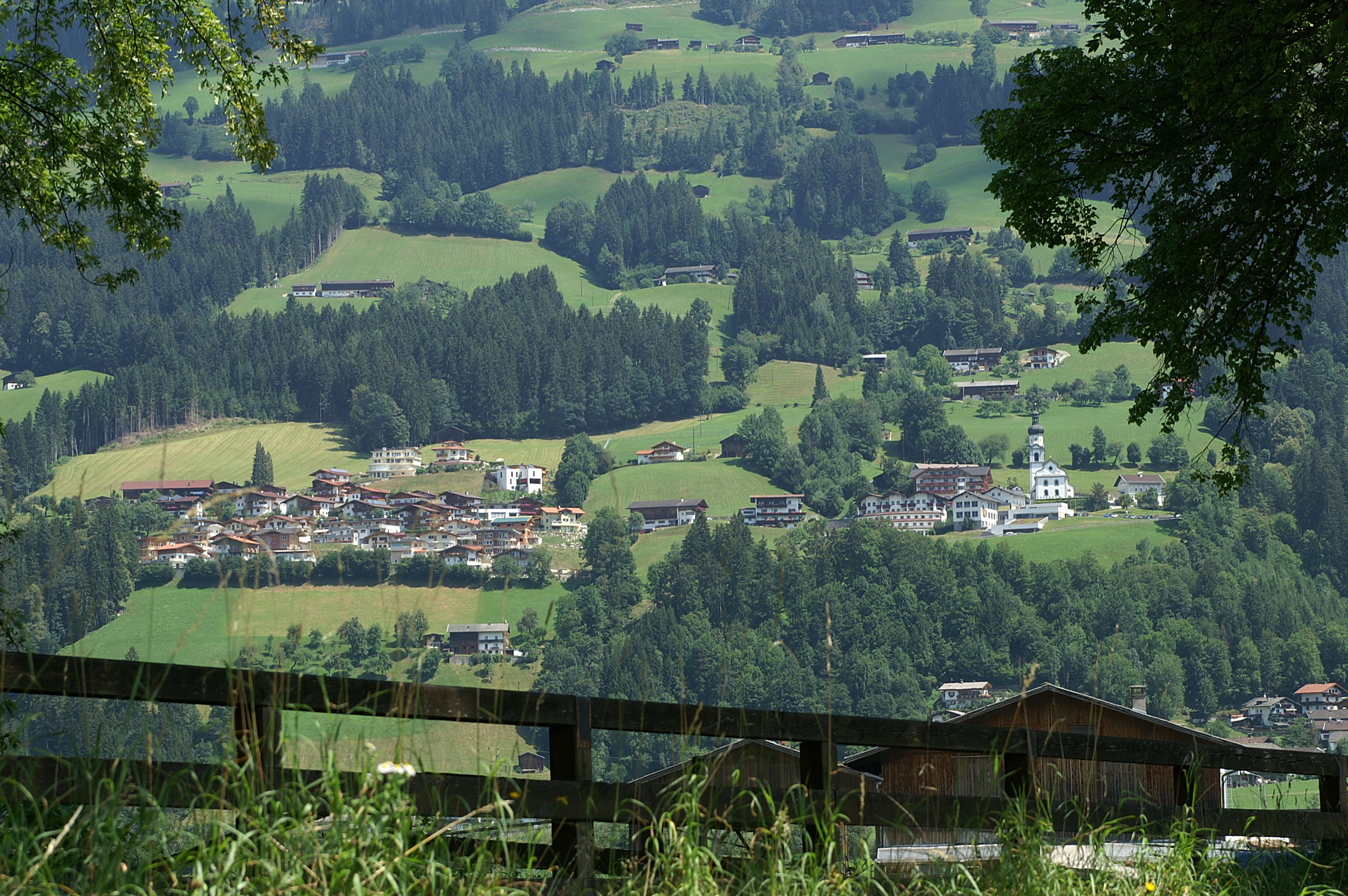

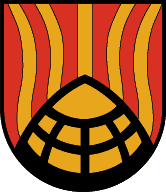
- Coat of arms

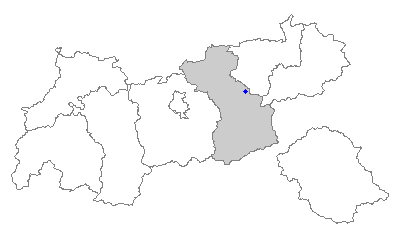
- Location within Tyrol

- Location within Austria
- Coordinates: 47°21′00″N 11°52′00″E
- Country: Austria
- State: Tyrol
- District: Schwaz

Government
  - Mayor: Daniel Schweinberger

Area
  - Total: 35.54 km^{2} (13.72 sq mi)
- Elevation: 666 m (2,185 ft)

Population (2026-01-01)
  - Total: 1,704
  - Density: 47.95/km^{2} (124.2/sq mi)
- Time zone: UTC+1 (CET)
  - Summer (DST): UTC+2 (CEST)
- Postal code: 6263
- Area code: 05288
- Vehicle registration: SZ
- Website: https://hartimzillertal.at/

Hart im Zillertal is a municipality in the Schwaz district in the Austrian state of Tyrol.

== Geography ==
Hart lies across from Fügen on the east side of the Ziller.
