= Hainzenberg =

- Municipality
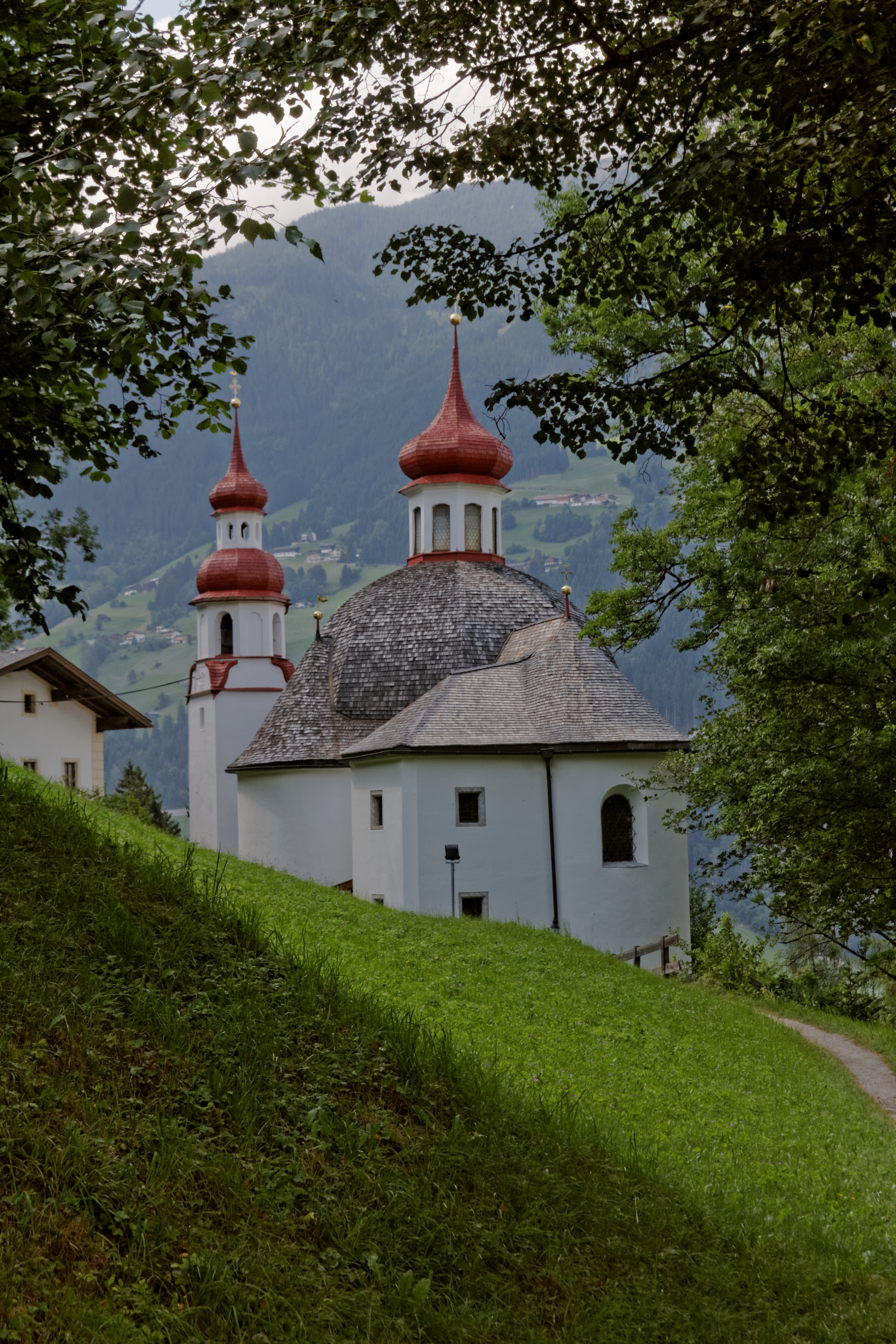

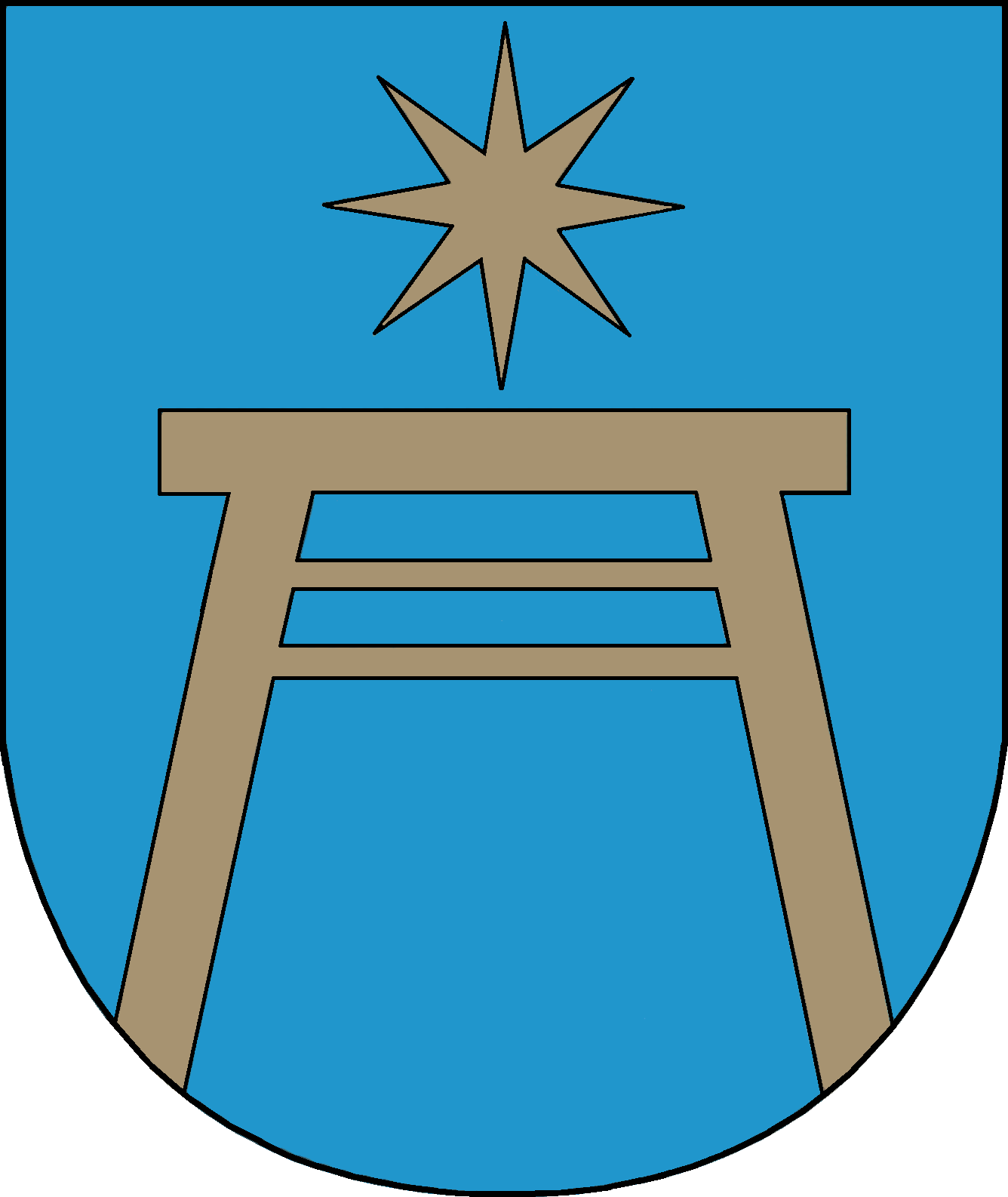
- Coat of arms

- Location within Austria
- Coordinates: 47°13′00″N 11°54′00″E
- Country: Austria
- State: Tyrol
- District: Schwaz

Government
  - Mayor: Georg Wartelsteiner

Area
  - Total: 21.49 km^{2} (8.30 sq mi)
- Elevation: 910 m (2,990 ft)

Population (2018-01-01)
  - Total: 731
  - Density: 34.0/km^{2} (88.1/sq mi)
- Time zone: UTC+1 (CET)
  - Summer (DST): UTC+2 (CEST)
- Postal code: 6280
- Area code: 05282
- Vehicle registration: SZ
- Website: www.hainzenberg. tirol.gv.at

Hainzenberg is a municipality in the Schwaz district in the Austrian state of Tyrol.

== Geography ==
Hainzenberg lies southeast of Zell am Ziller at the entrance to the Gerlos valley.
