= Schwaz District =

Coordinates: 47.4°N 11.8°E

Schwaz District Bezirk Schwaz
- District
- Country: Austria
- State: Tyrol
- Number of municipalities: 39
- Administrative seat: Schwaz

Government
  - District Governor: Michael Brandl

Area
  - Total: 1,887.49 km^{2} (728.76 sq mi)

Population (2012)
  - Total: 79,511
  - Density: 42.125/km^{2} (109.10/sq mi)
- Time zone: UTC+01:00 (CET)
  - Summer (DST): UTC+02:00 (CEST)
- Vehicle registration: SZ

The Bezirk Schwaz is an administrative district (Bezirk) in Tyrol, Austria. It borders Bavaria (Germany) in the north, the districts of Kufstein, Kitzbühel and Pinzgau (Salzburg) in the east, South Tyrol (Italy) in the south, and the Innsbruck-Land district in the west.

Area of the district is 1,887.49 km^{2}, with a population of 79,511 (January 1, 2012), and population density of 42 persons per km^{2}. Administrative center of the district is Schwaz.

== Geography ==
The district comprises a part of the lower Inn valley, the complete Zillertal valley with its tributary valleys (like the Tuxertal), and the Achental valley with the Achensee. Mountain ranges within the district include the Tux Alps, Zillertal Alps, Kitzbühel Alps, the Karwendel and the Rofan.

Historical population
Year	Pop.	±%
1869	28,251	—
1880	27,792	−1.6%
1890	28,200	+1.5%
1900	29,203	+3.6%
1910	31,297	+7.2%
1923	32,144	+2.7%
1934	35,662	+10.9%
1939	37,226	+4.4%
1951	44,033	+18.3%
1961	48,321	+9.7%
1971	57,611	+19.2%
1981	62,589	+8.6%
1991	68,692	+9.8%
2001	74,834	+8.9%
Source: Statistik Austria

== Administrative divisions ==
The district is divided into 39 municipalities:

- Achenkirch (2,156)
- Aschau im Zillertal (1,732)
- Brandberg (348)
- Bruck am Ziller (993)
- Buch bei Jenbach (2,549)
- Eben am Achensee (2,849)
- Finkenberg (1,510)
- Fügen (3,838)
- Fügenberg (1,341)
- Gallzein (598)
- Gerlos (786)
- Gerlosberg (483)
- Hainzenberg (687)
- Hart im Zillertal (1,510)
- Hippach (1,376)
- Jenbach (6,851)
- Kaltenbach (1,229)
- Mayrhofen (3,821)
- Pill (1,112)
- Ramsau im Zillertal (1,570)
- Ried im Zillertal (1,225)
- Rohrberg (533)
- Schlitters (1,400)
- Schwaz (13,058)
- Schwendau (1,608)
- Stans (1,930)
- Steinberg am Rofan (295)
- Strass im Zillertal (840)
- Stumm (1,807)
- Stummerberg (841)
- Terfens (2,082)
- Tux (1,932)
- Uderns (1,663)
- Vomp (4,661)
- Weer (1,545)
- Weerberg (2,337)
- Wiesing (2,039)
- Zell am Ziller (1,743)
- Zellberg (633)
