= Zellberg =

- Municipality
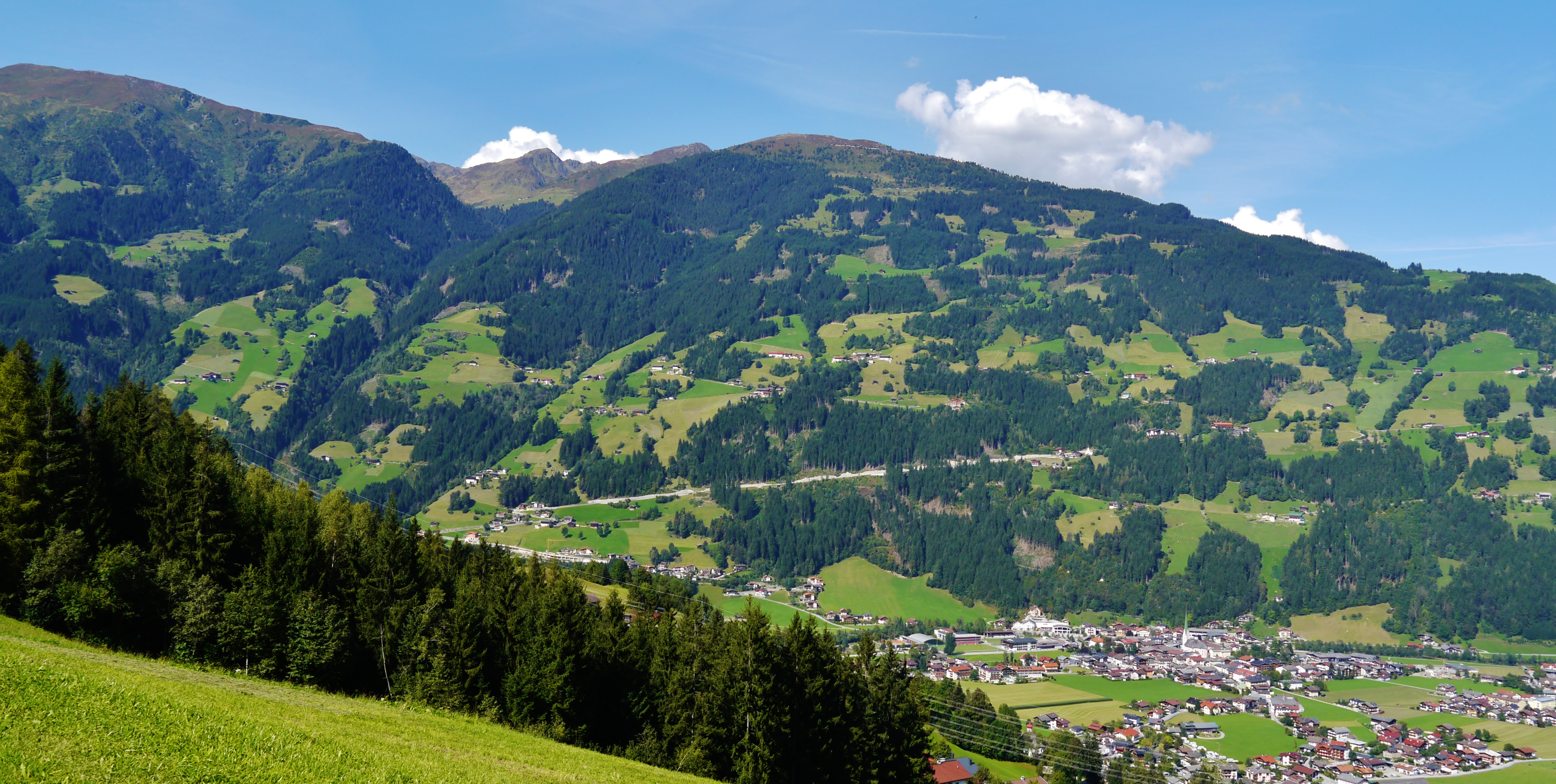
- View of Zellberg

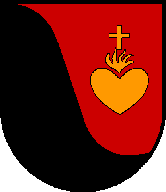
- Coat of arms

- Location within Austria
- Coordinates: 47°13′52″N 11°52′19″E
- Country: Austria
- State: Tyrol
- District: Schwaz

Government
  - Mayor: Ferdinand Fankhauser

Area
  - Total: 12.13 km^{2} (4.68 sq mi)
- Elevation: 575 m (1,886 ft)

Population (2021)
  - Total: 680
  - Density: 56/km^{2} (150/sq mi)
- Time zone: UTC+1 (CET)
  - Summer (DST): UTC+2 (CEST)
- Postal code: 6280
- Area code: 05282
- Vehicle registration: SZ
- Website: www.zellberg.tirol.gv.at

Zellberg is a municipality in the Schwaz district in the Austrian state of Tyrol.

== Geography ==
Zellberg lies in the upper Ziller valley on the left bank of the Ziller next to Zell am Ziller.
