= Rastkogel =

Tux Alps' main crest mountain, Tyrol, Austria

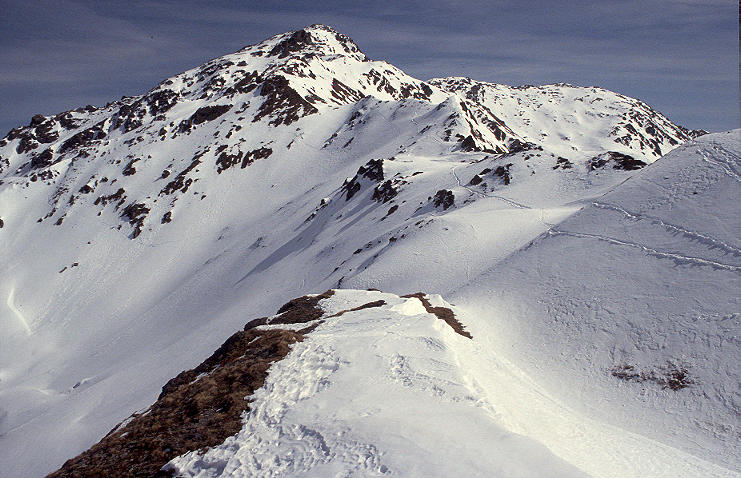

Highest point
- Elevation: 2,762 m (AA) (9,062 ft)
- Coordinates: 47°12′16″N 11°45′04″E

Geography
- Location within Austria
- Location: Tyrol, Austria
- Parent range: Tux Alps

Geology
- Mountain type: Rocky mountain

Climbing
- Easiest route: Three-hour hike from the Rastkogel Hut

The Rastkogel is a 2,762 metre high, pyramidal, mountain on the main crest of the Tux Alps in the Austrian federal state of Tyrol.

== Location and area ==
The Rastkogel lies five kilometres north-northeast as the crow flies of Vorderlanersbach (municipality of Tux) in the Tuxertal, the westernmost side valley of the Zillertal. Its neighbouring peaks are: to the west, separated by the Nurpensjoch saddle (2,525 m), the Halslspitze at 2,574 metres, and beyond that over the Wattentaler Lizum, the Hirzer (2,725 m). To the north lies the Roßkopf (2,576 m) and - jutting far out into the Inn valley - the Gilfert (2,506 m) and, to the east, separated by the Hoarbergjoch (2,590 m), the Pangert at 2,550 metres.

Due to its prominent location in the south of the Tuxertal, the Rastkogel is an oft-frequented mountain. At its summit the crest divides like a cross into the three aforementioned directions, although its rock faces are mainly oriented in a north-south direction. To the south the massif drops relatively steeply into the Tuxertal.

== Bases and routes to the summit ==
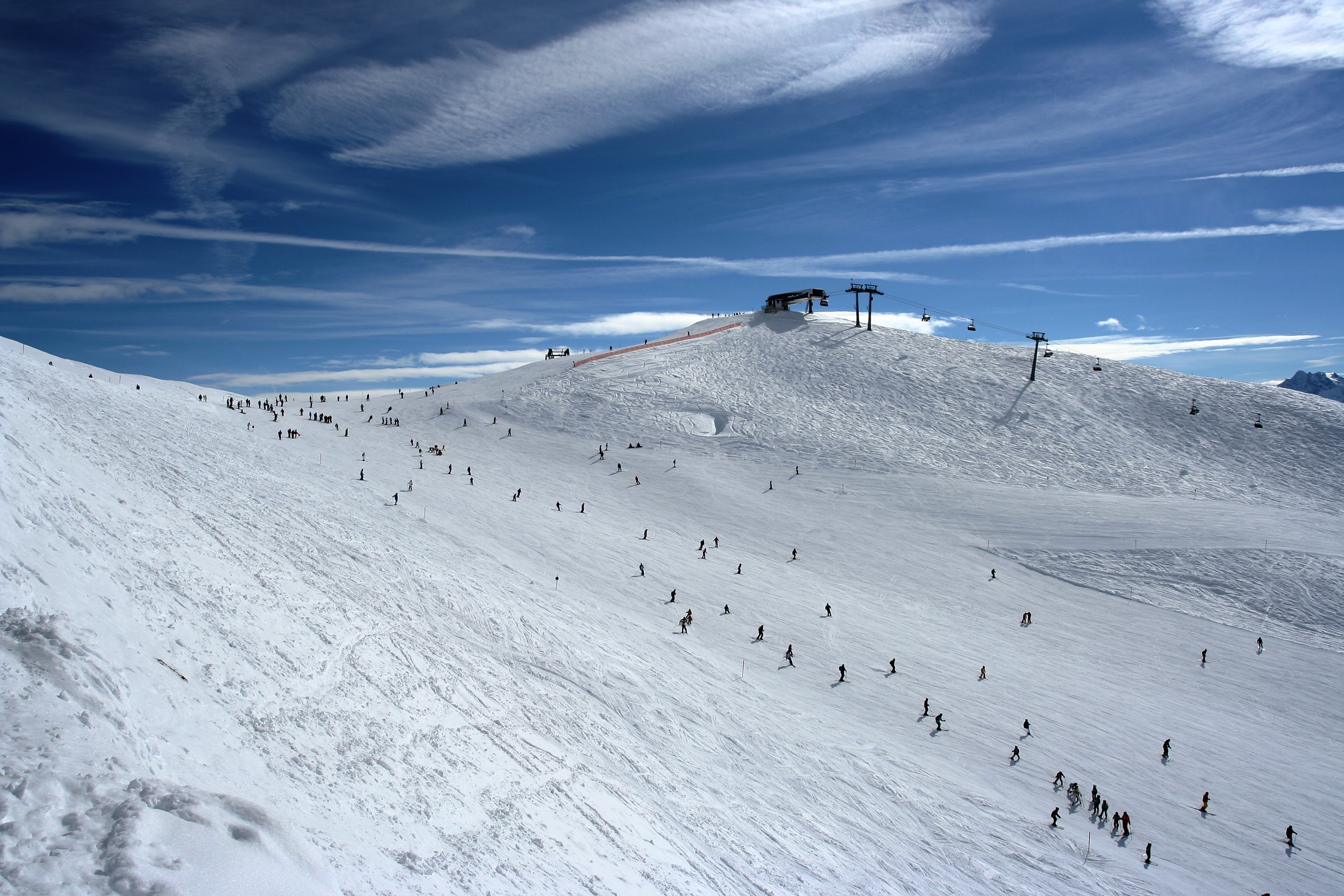
Ski lifts on the Rastkogel.

An ascent of the Rastkogel as an Alpine mountain hike along the normal route, which is the easiest one, takes about 3 hours, approaching from the north along the southeast ridge (Südostgrat) from the Rastkogel Hut (2,117 m). Another route runs from the Weidener Hut (1,799 m) to the northwest over the Haslspitze and the west ridge (Westgrat) taking a good four hours to gain the summit.

On the southwest flank of the Rastkogels there is a skiing area that is reached from Vorderlanersbach on a ski lift.

A popular route for those staying in Mayrhofen is to take the Penken lift to the top station and then walk along route 23 to Penkenjoch with views across the Zillertal Alps. Route 57 should then be followed (clearly signposted) past the Wanglalm hut. Route 57 then climbs up to the summit of the Wanglspitze at 2420m continuing on to Hoarbergjoch at 2590m. Continue NNW along route 57 until it joins route 51. Continue along route 51 which becomes steeper until the ridge is reached. Turn west along a well marked trail that leads to the summit of Rastkogel. The final km involves some mild scrambling. The recommended time for the walk is 3.5 to 4 hours each way. These timings are for an average walker in good conditions. The Penken lift starts at 9.00 am and the last trip down is at 4.30pm (2011). It is worth checking before starting as if there are no more lifts it is another 2 to 3 hours walking down to Mayrhofen. (The 1:35000 Mayr map 33 Zillertaller Alpen has all the route numbers for the area clearly marked.)

== Sources and maps ==
- Walter Klier: Gebietsführer Zillertaler Alpen (Nördlicher Teil) und Tuxer Voralpen, Munich, 1990, ISBN 3-7633-3258-8
- Walter Klier: Zillertal, mit Gerlos- und Tuxer Tal, Bergverlag Rother, Munich, 2008. ISBN 978-3-7633-4175-7
- Freytag & Berndt-Verlag Vienna, Wanderkarte 1:50,000, Blatt WK 151, Zillertal, Tuxer Alpen, Jenbach-Schwaz. ISBN 978-3-85084-751-3
