= Bruck am Ziller =

- Municipality
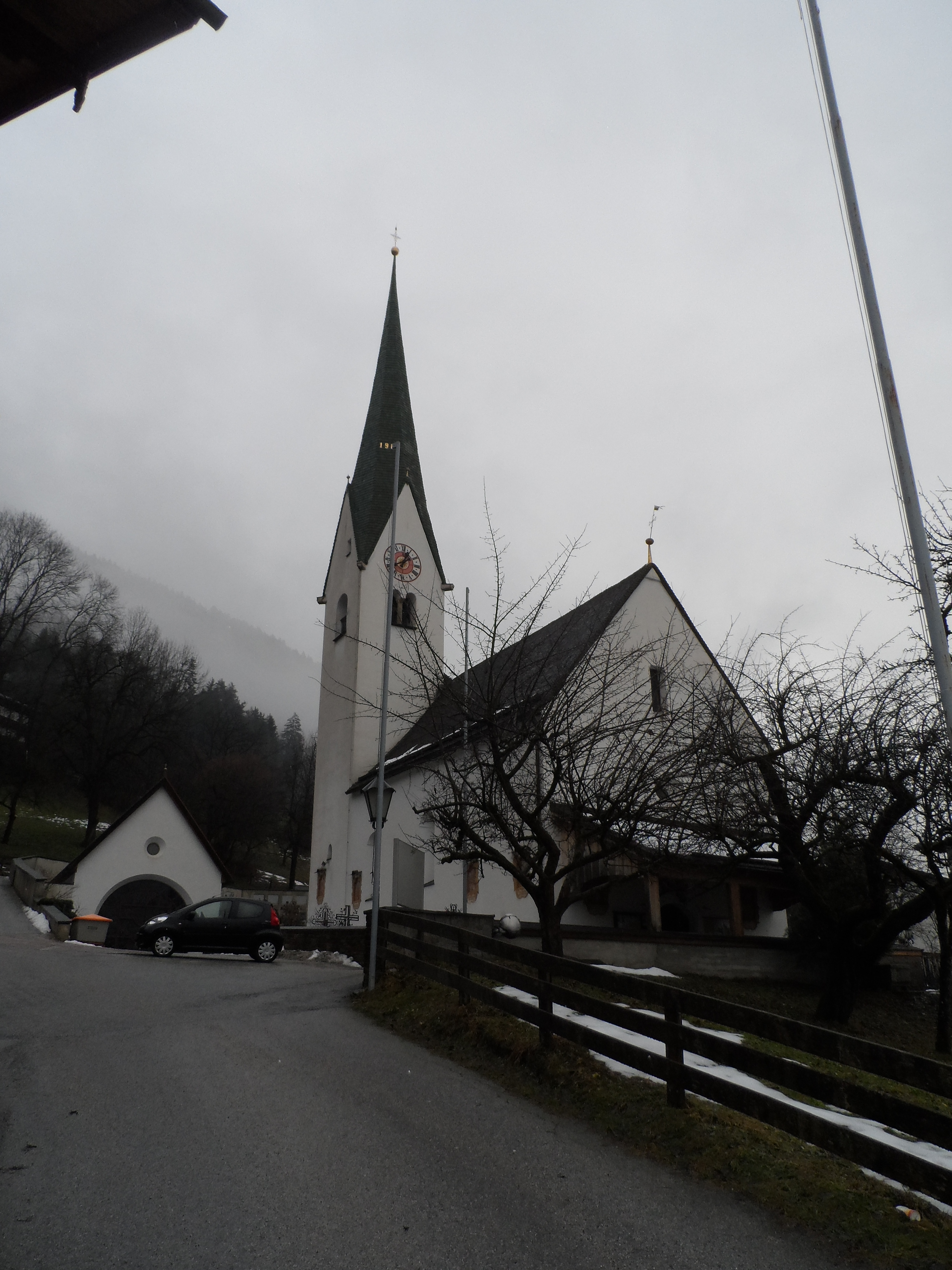

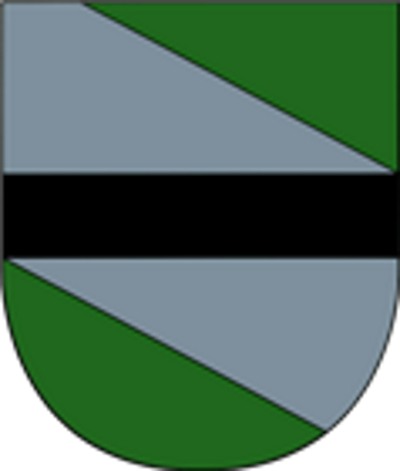
- Coat of arms

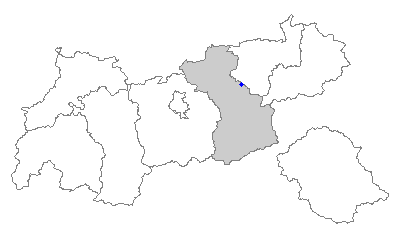
- Location within Tyrol

- Location within Austria
- Coordinates: 47°22′00″N 11°50′00″E
- Country: Austria
- State: Tyrol
- District: Schwaz

Government
  - Mayor: Alois Wurm (BLB) (GLB)

Area
  - Total: 6.01 km^{2} (2.32 sq mi)
- Elevation: 579 m (1,900 ft)

Population (2018-01-01)
  - Total: 1,098
  - Density: 183/km^{2} (473/sq mi)
- Time zone: UTC+1 (CET)
  - Summer (DST): UTC+2 (CEST)
- Postal code: 6260
- Area code: 05288
- Vehicle registration: SZ
- Website: www.bruck-im-zillertal.at

Bruck am Ziller is a municipality in the Schwaz district in the Austrian state of Tyrol. The name derives from the river Ziller.

== Geography ==
Bruck lies at the entrance to the Ziller valley east of the river on a low terrace.
