= Brandberg, Tyrol =

Brandberg
- Municipality
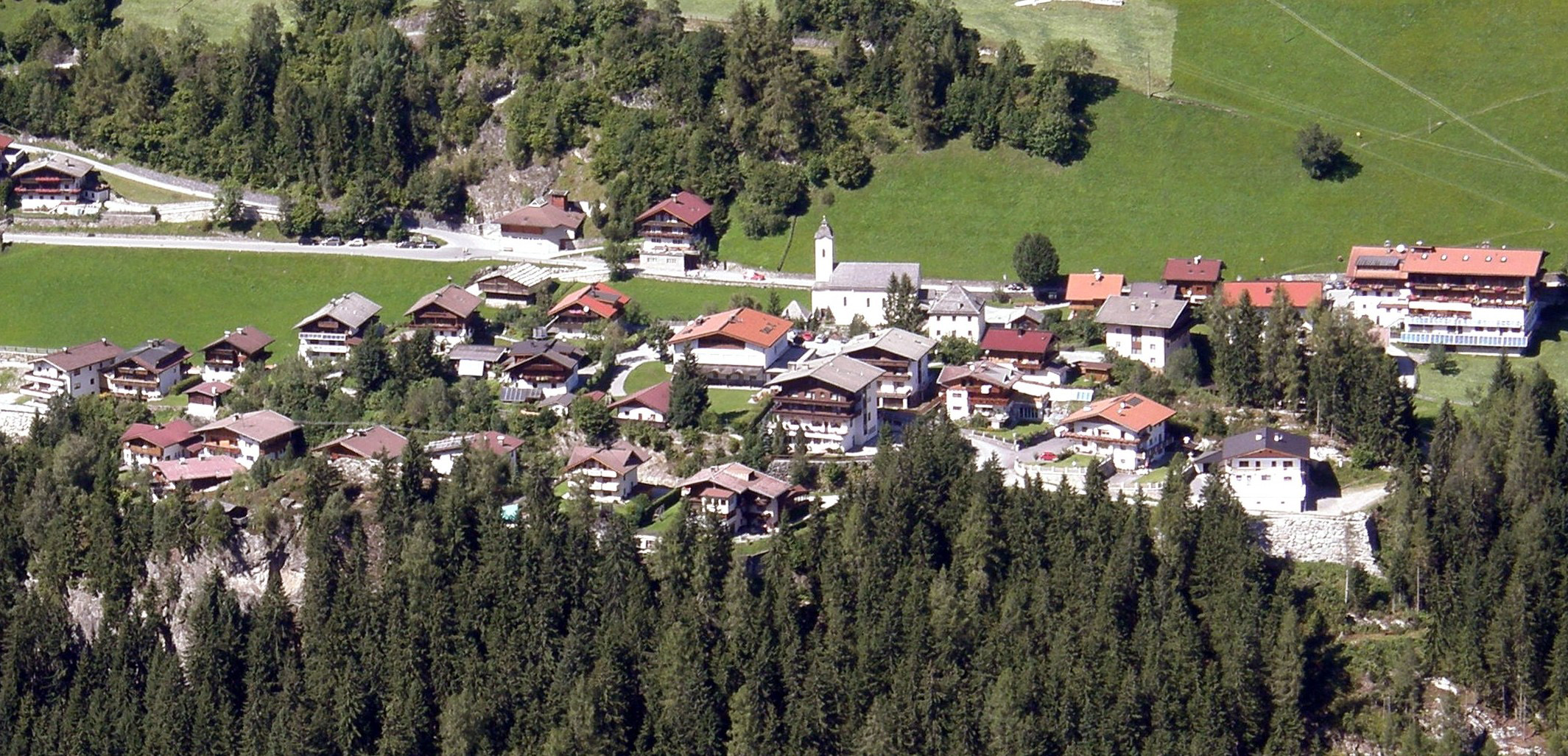

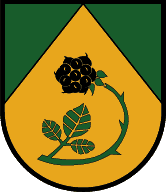
- Coat of arms

- Location within Austria
- Coordinates: 47°10′00″N 11°54′00″E
- Country: Austria
- State: Tyrol
- District: Schwaz

Government
  - Mayor: Hermann Thanner

Area
  - Total: 156.47 km^{2} (60.41 sq mi)
- Elevation: 1,082 m (3,550 ft)

Population (2018-01-01)
  - Total: 354
  - Density: 2.26/km^{2} (5.86/sq mi)
- Time zone: UTC+1 (CET)
  - Summer (DST): UTC+2 (CEST)
- Postal code: 6290
- Area code: 05285
- Vehicle registration: SZ
- Website: www.brandberg.tirol.gv.at

Brandberg is a municipality in the Schwaz district of in the Austrian state of Tyrol.

== Geography ==
Brandberg lies in a side valley of the Ziller on the border with Italy.
