= Ramsau im Zillertal =

- Municipality
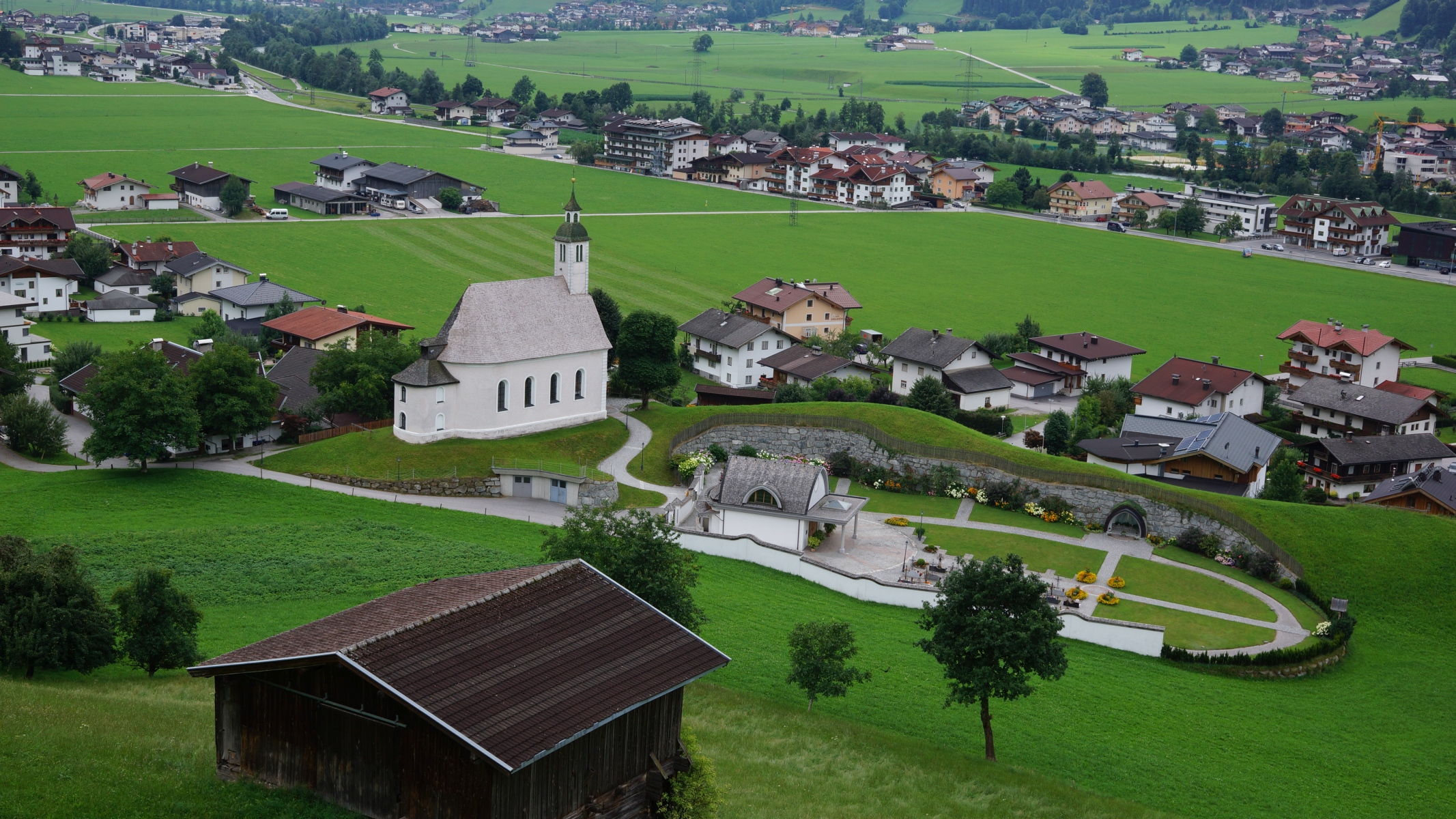
- Center of the village seen from the northeast

- Flag Coat of arms

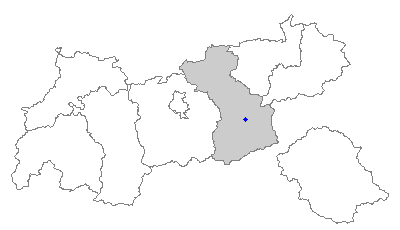
- Location within Tyrol

- Location within Austria
- Coordinates: 47°12′00″N 11°52′00″E
- Country: Austria
- State: Tyrol
- District: Schwaz

Government
  - Mayor: Friedrich Steiner

Area
  - Total: 8.95 km^{2} (3.46 sq mi)
- Elevation: 604 m (1,982 ft)

Population (2021)
  - Total: 1,670
  - Density: 187/km^{2} (483/sq mi)
- Time zone: UTC+1 (CET)
  - Summer (DST): UTC+2 (CEST)
- Postal code: 6284
- Area code: 05282
- Vehicle registration: SZ
- Website: www.ramsau. tirol.gv.at

Ramsau im Zillertal is a municipality in the Schwaz district in the Austrian state of Tyrol.

== Geography ==
Ramsau lies in the upper Ziller valley east of the Ziller.
