= Aschau im Zillertal =

- Municipality
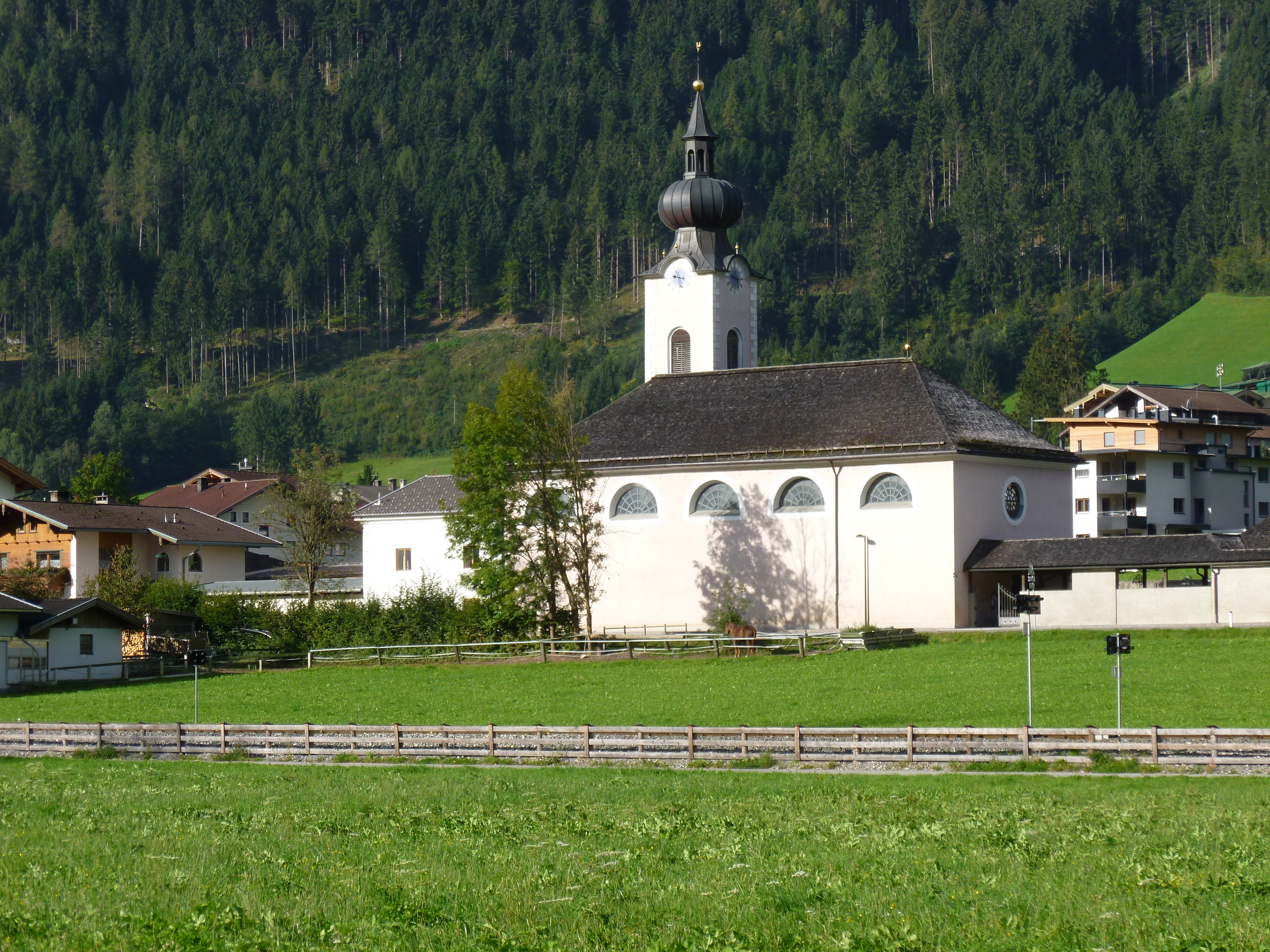
- Aschau parish church

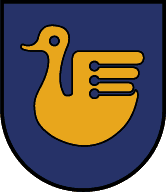
- Coat of arms

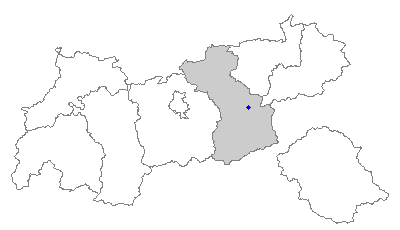
- Location within Tyrol

- Location within Austria
- Coordinates: 47°16′00″N 11°54′00″E
- Country: Austria
- State: Tyrol
- District: Schwaz

Government
  - Mayor: Andreas Egger

Area
  - Total: 20.27 km^{2} (7.83 sq mi)
- Elevation: 567 m (1,860 ft)

Population (2018-01-01)
  - Total: 1,866
  - Density: 92.06/km^{2} (238.4/sq mi)
- Time zone: UTC+1 (CET)
  - Summer (DST): UTC+2 (CEST)
- Postal code: 6274
- Area code: 05282
- Vehicle registration: SZ
- Website: www.aschauimzillertal.at

Aschau im Zillertal is a municipality in the Schwaz district in the Austrian state of Tyrol.

== Geography ==
Aschau lies in a narrow neck of the Ziller valley on both sides of the river.
