= Rohrberg (Habichtswald) =

German mountain

- Location within Hesse

Highest point
- Elevation: 600.7 m (1,971 ft)
- Coordinates: 51°21′08″N 9°16′04″E

Geography
- Location: Hesse, Germany

Rohrberg is a mountain of Hesse, Germany.
