= Pill, Tyrol =

Pill
- Municipality
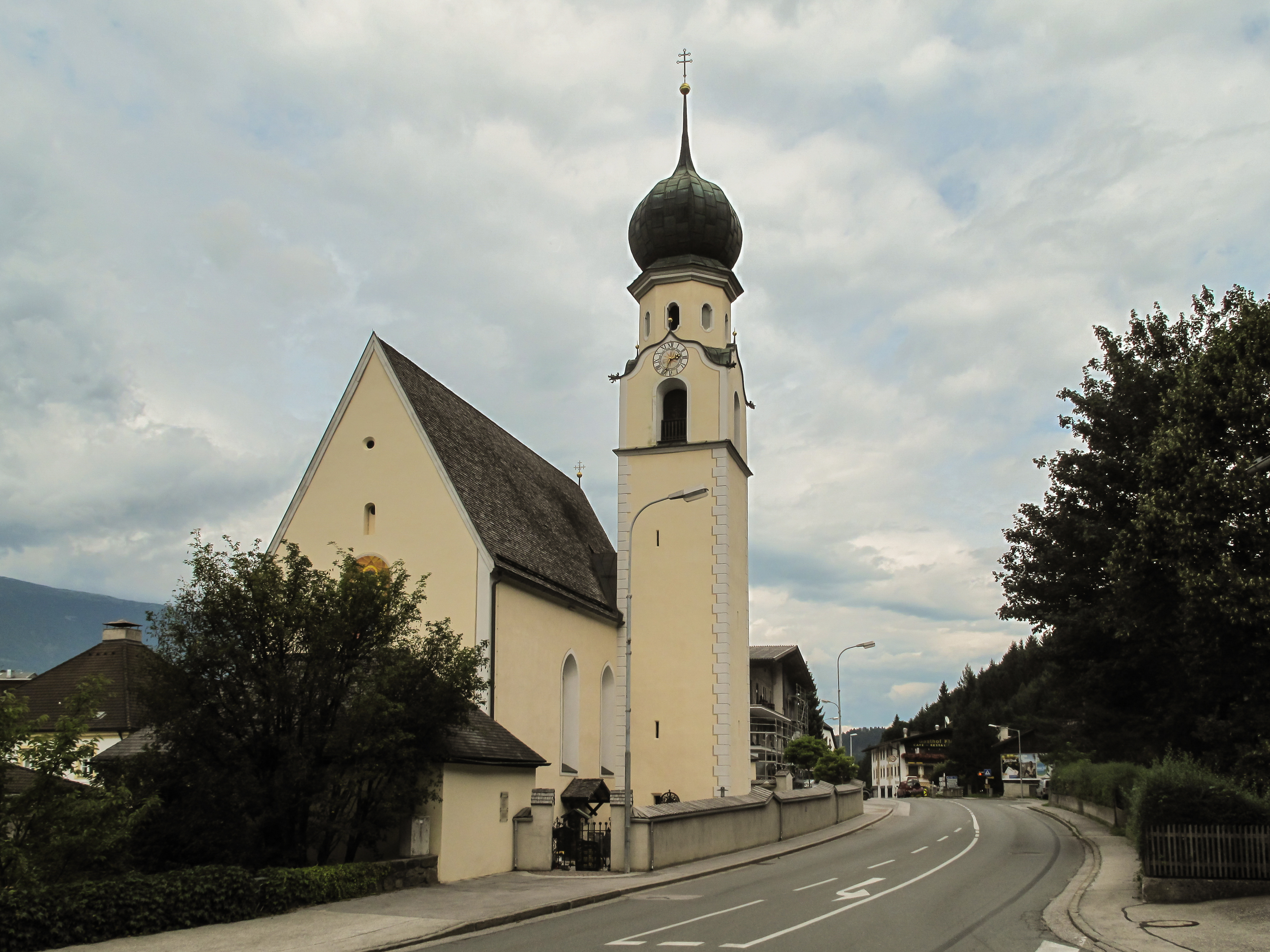
- Church of Saint Anne

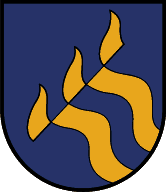
- Coat of arms

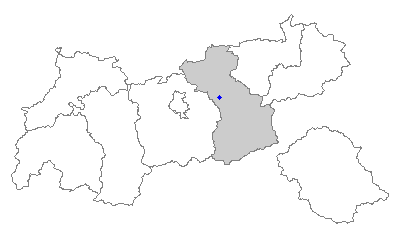
- Location within Tyrol

- Location within Austria
- Coordinates: 47°19′15″N 11°40′57″E
- Country: Austria
- State: Tyrol
- District: Schwaz

Government
  - Mayor: Hannes Fender

Area
  - Total: 20.93 km^{2} (8.08 sq mi)
- Elevation: 556 m (1,824 ft)

Population (2018-01-01)
  - Total: 1,174
  - Density: 56.09/km^{2} (145.3/sq mi)
- Time zone: UTC+1 (CET)
  - Summer (DST): UTC+2 (CEST)
- Postal code: 6130
- Area code: 05242
- Vehicle registration: SZ
- Website: www.pill.tirol.gv.at

Pill is a municipality in the Schwaz district in the Austrian state of Tyrol. The 2024 Tour of the Alps passed through Pill on the 16th of April.

== Geography ==
Pill lies in the Lower Inn Valley near Schwaz.
