= Hippach =

- Municipality
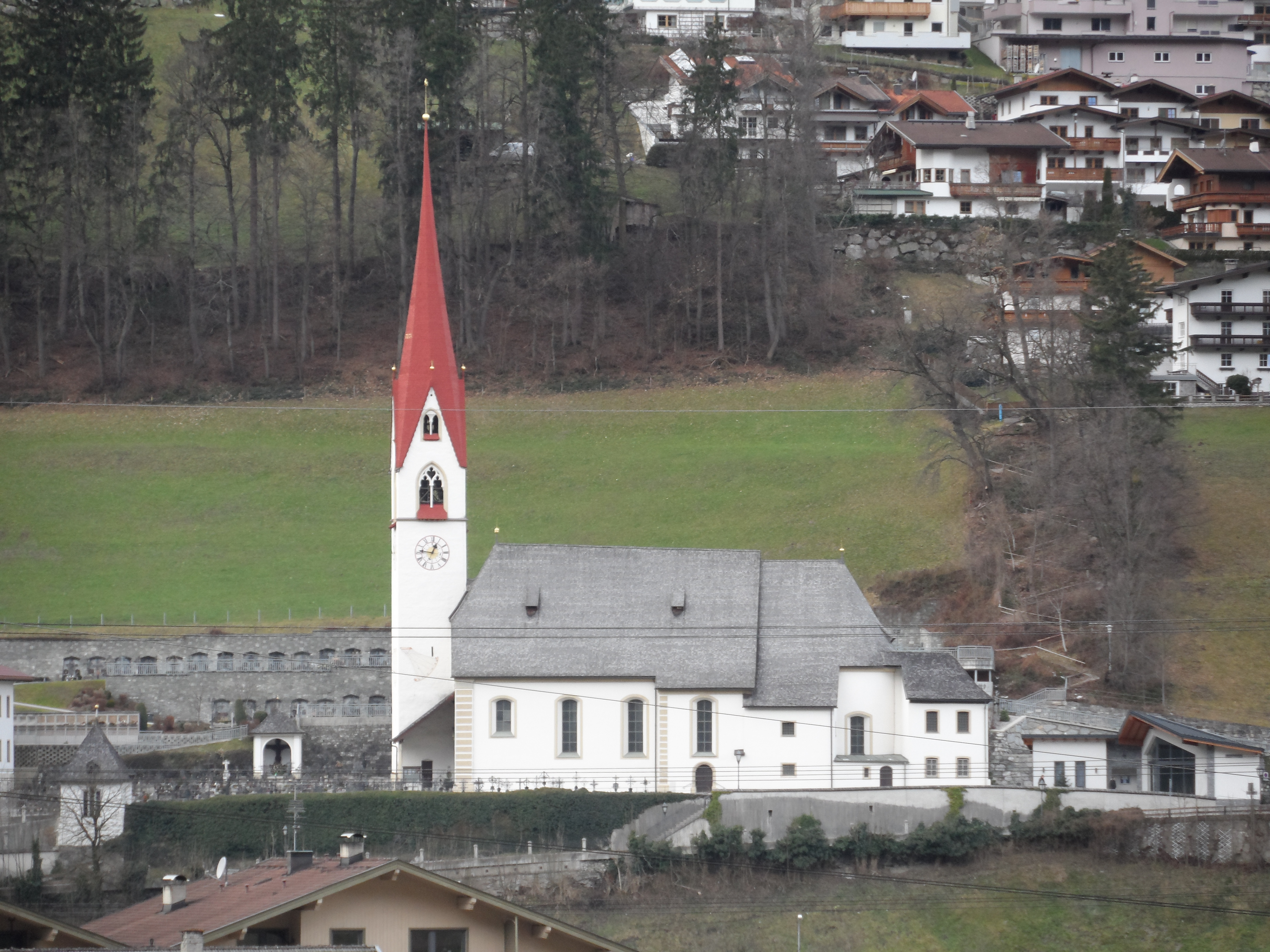

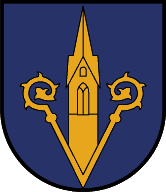
- Coat of arms

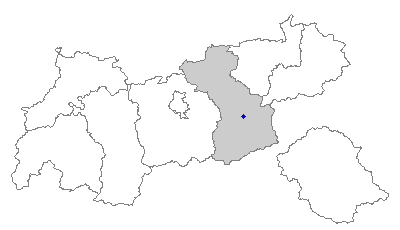
- Location within Tyrol

- Location within Austria
- Coordinates: 47°12′00″N 11°52′00″E
- Country: Austria
- State: Tyrol
- District: Schwaz

Government
  - Mayor: Gerhard Hundsbichler (ÖVP)

Area
  - Total: 39.36 km^{2} (15.20 sq mi)
- Elevation: 608 m (1,995 ft)

Population (2018-01-01)
  - Total: 1,455
  - Density: 36.97/km^{2} (95.74/sq mi)
- Time zone: UTC+1 (CET)
  - Summer (DST): UTC+2 (CEST)
- Postal code: 6283
- Area code: 05282
- Vehicle registration: SZ
- Website: www.gemeinde-hippach.at

Hippach is a municipality in the Schwaz district in the Austrian state of Tyrol.

== Geography ==
Hippach lies in the Ziller valley west of the Ziller.
