= Ried im Zillertal =

- Municipality
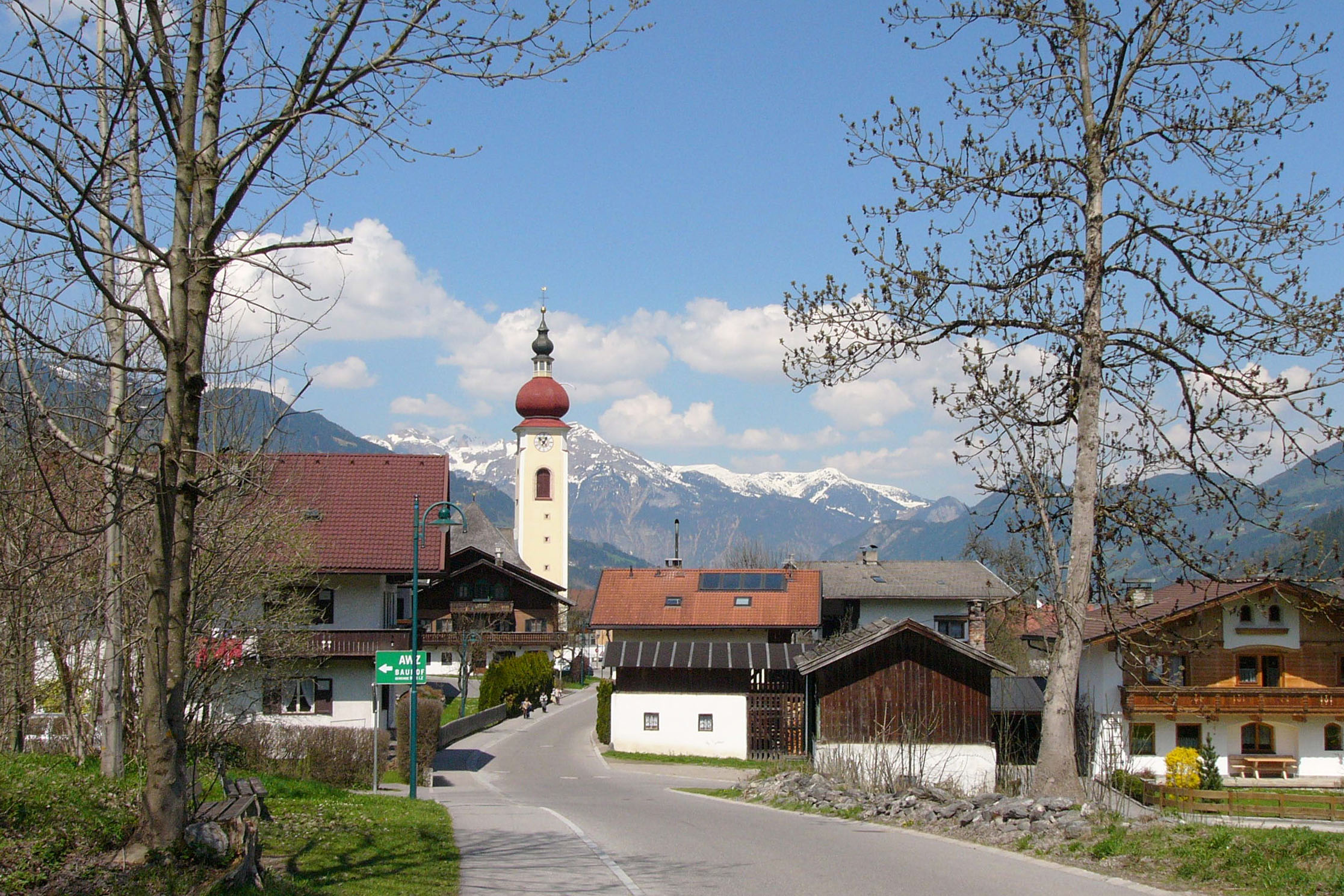
- Ried im Zillertal seen from the south

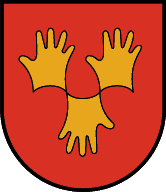
- Coat of arms

- Location within Austria
- Coordinates: 47°18′00″N 11°52′10″E
- Country: Austria
- State: Tyrol
- District: Schwaz

Government
  - Mayor: Hansjörg Jäger (ÖVP)

Area
  - Total: 9.46 km^{2} (3.65 sq mi)
- Elevation: 573 m (1,880 ft)

Population (2021)
  - Total: 1,278
  - Density: 135/km^{2} (350/sq mi)
- Time zone: UTC+1 (CET)
  - Summer (DST): UTC+2 (CEST)
- Postal code: 6272
- Area code: 05283
- Vehicle registration: SZ
- Website: www.riskommunal.net/ riedimzillertal

Ried im Zillertal is a municipality in the Schwaz district in the Austrian state of Tyrol.

== Geography ==
Ried lies in the central Ziller valley on the left bank of the Ziller.
