= Weer =

- Municipality
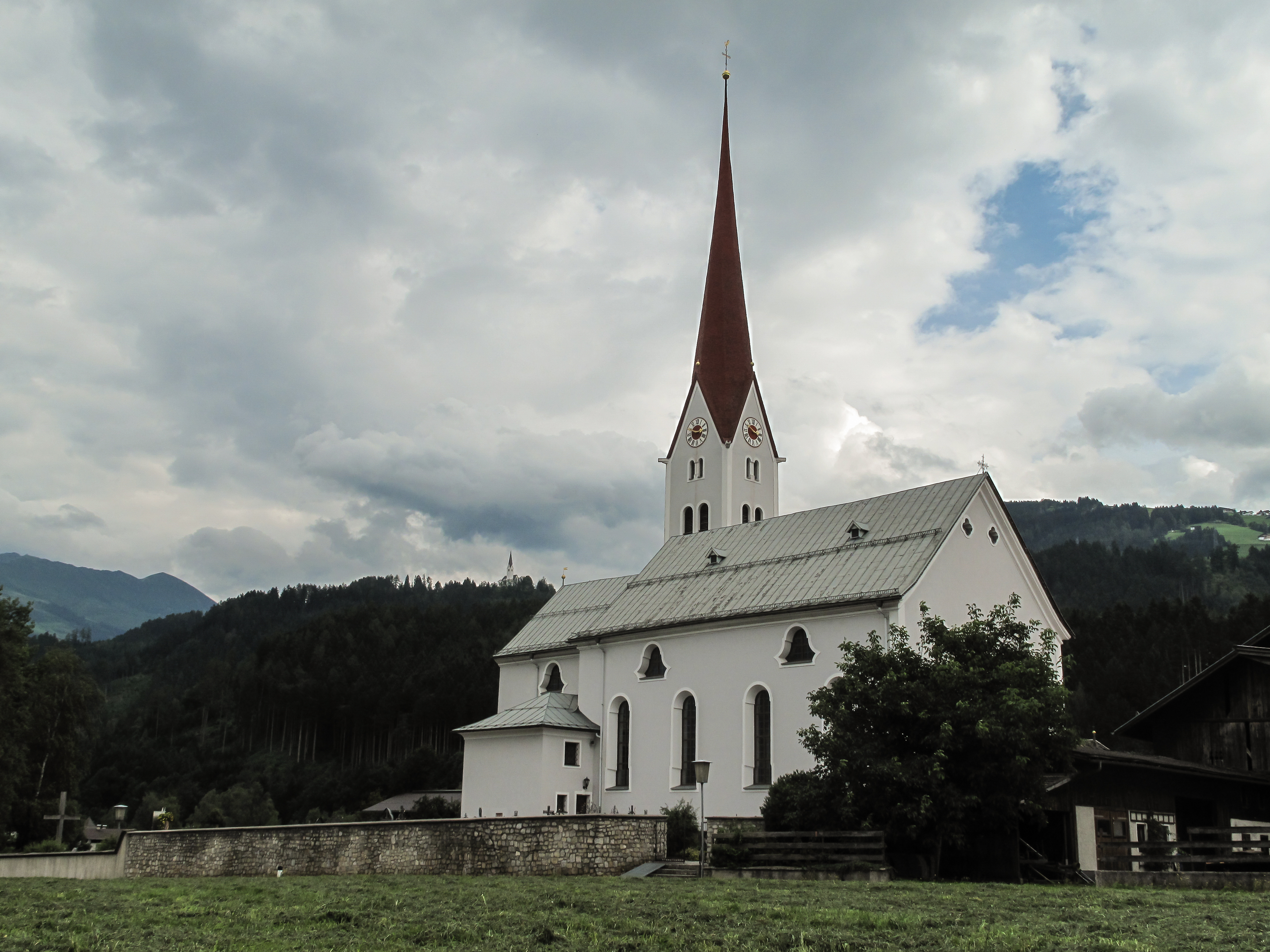

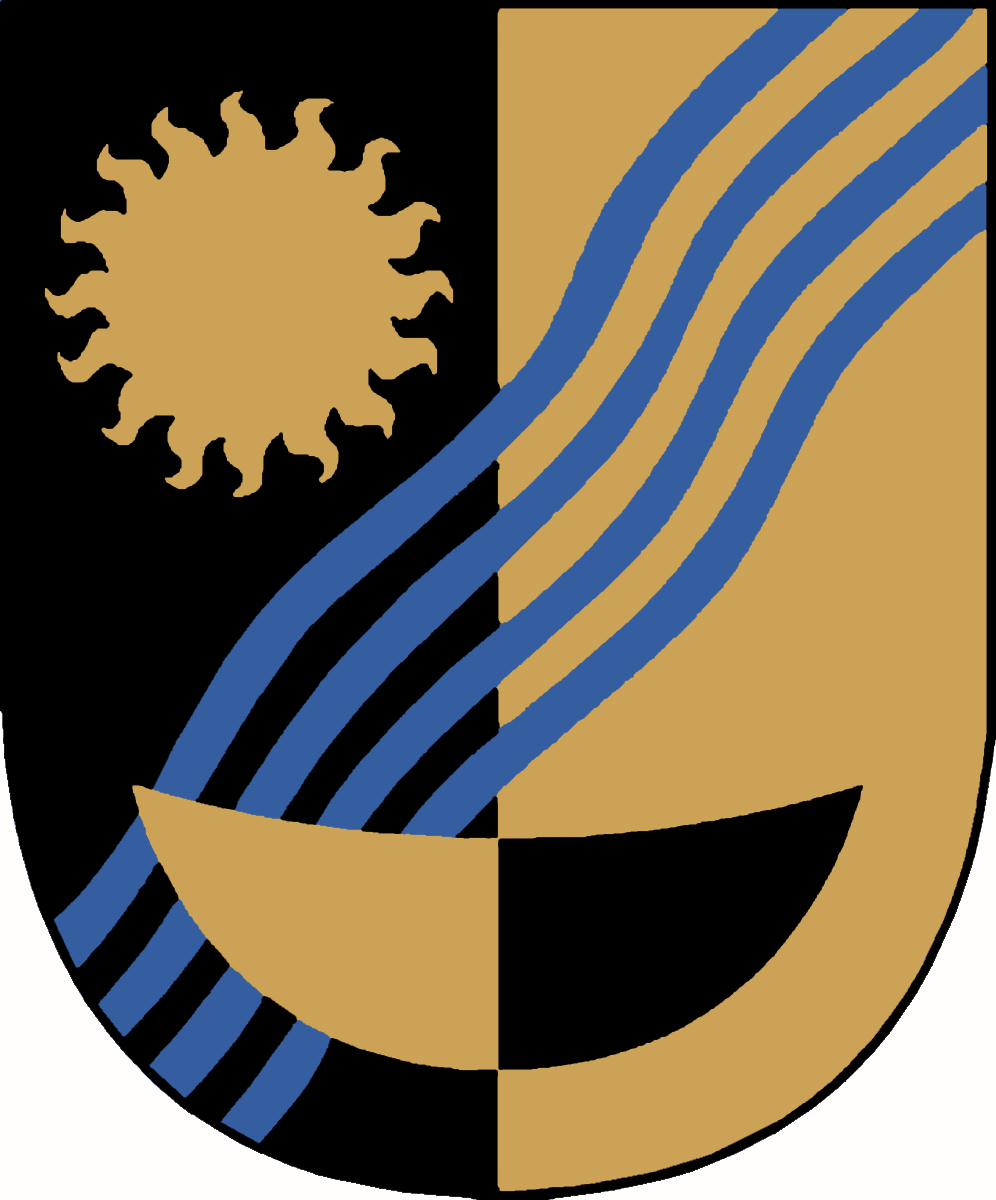
- Coat of arms

- Location within Austria
- Coordinates: 47°18′19″N 11°38′44″E
- Country: Austria
- State: Tyrol
- District: Schwaz

Government
  - Mayor: Markus Zeyerfeld

Area
  - Total: 5.61 km^{2} (2.17 sq mi)
- Elevation: 558 m (1,831 ft)

Population (2021)
  - Total: 1,640
  - Density: 292/km^{2} (757/sq mi)
- Time zone: UTC+1 (CET)
  - Summer (DST): UTC+2 (CEST)
- Postal code: 6116
- Area code: +43 5224
- Vehicle registration: SZ
- Website: www.weer.at

Weer is a municipality in the district of Schwaz in the Austrian state of Tyrol. It lies in the east of the Weerbach.

Until World War II Weer was a farming village. After World War II, due to developing industrialisation in the peripherals (mainly Schwaz and Innsbruck) it became much bigger. The area of Weer is 561 ha, of which 330 ha are used for extended agriculture.

The first settlers were Illyrian, later house names also refer to presence of Romans. For four centuries Weer then was located in the Roman province of Rhaetia.

The village is named first in 1075, its name derives from a Celtic-Illyrian root. Around 1500, because of the enormous silver mining industry in Schwaz, the outlying villages were also explored for natural resources. Thus, a small gold washery was established in Weer. The crest of the village still shows a gold washing tool at the bottom.
