= Rohrberg, Austria =

Rohrberg
- Municipality
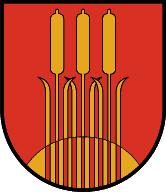
- Coat of arms

- Location within Austria
- Coordinates: 47°14′15″N 11°53′56″E
- Country: Austria
- State: Tyrol
- District: Schwaz

Government
  - Mayor: Johann Schreyer

Area
  - Total: 10.16 km^{2} (3.92 sq mi)
- Elevation: 675 m (2,215 ft)

Population (2021)
  - Total: 581
  - Density: 57.2/km^{2} (148/sq mi)
- Time zone: UTC+1 (CET)
  - Summer (DST): UTC+2 (CEST)
- Postal code: 6280
- Area code: 05282
- Vehicle registration: SZ
- Website: www.rohrberg.tirol.gv.at

Rohrberg is a municipality in the Schwaz district in the Austrian state of Tyrol.

== Geography ==
Rohrberg lies in the Ziller valley with scattered settlements on the steep surrounding slopes.
