= Fügen =

- Municipality
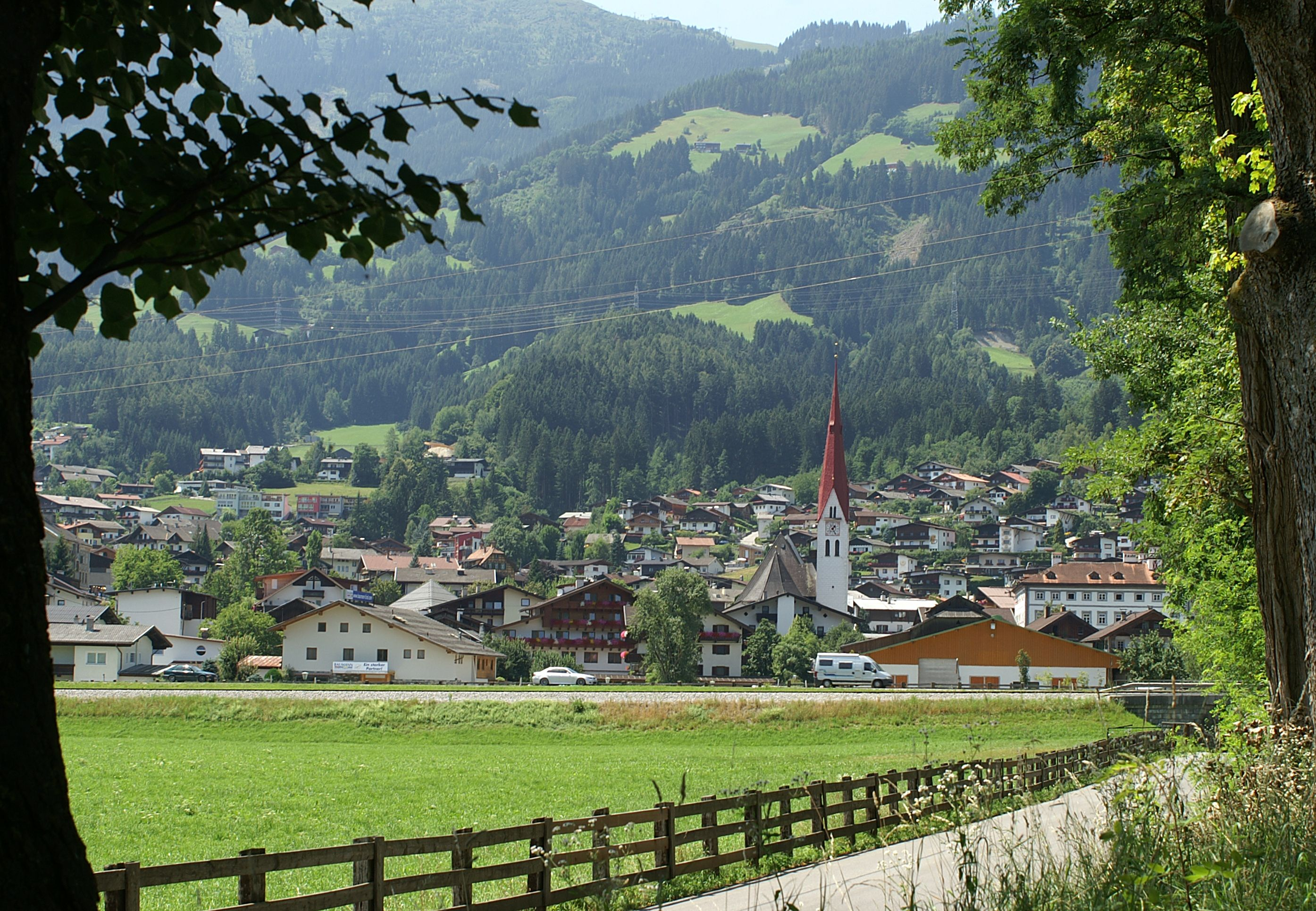

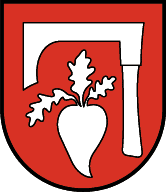
- Coat of arms

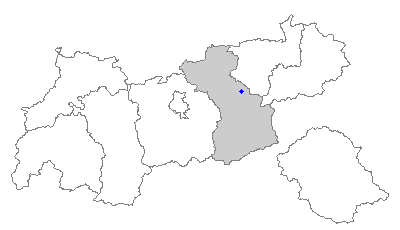
- Location within Tyrol

- Location within Austria
- Coordinates: 47°21′00″N 11°50′00″E
- Country: Austria
- State: Tyrol
- District: Schwaz

Government
  - Mayor: Dominik Mainusch (Zukunft Fügen)

Area
  - Total: 6.64 km^{2} (2.56 sq mi)
- Elevation: 545 m (1,788 ft)

Population (2021)
  - Total: 4,227
  - Density: 637/km^{2} (1,650/sq mi)
- Time zone: UTC+1 (CET)
  - Summer (DST): UTC+2 (CEST)
- Postal code: 6263
- Area code: 05288
- Vehicle registration: SZ
- Website: www.fuegen.at

Fügen is a municipality in the Schwaz district in the Austrian state of Tyrol.
