= Lower Inn Valley =

Region of the Tyrolean Unterland, Austria

Coordinates: 47°27′28″N 11°56′44″E

The Lower Inn Valley (German: Unterinntal) is that part of the Inntal valley through which the Inn river flows from a point a few kilometres west of Innsbruck near its confluence with the Melach downstream to a few kilometres before Rosenheim. A further distinction can be made between the Tyrolean Lower Inn Valley (Tiroler Unterinntal) (as far as Kufstein) and the Bavarian Lower Inn Valley (from Kiefersfelden).

The Lower Inn Valley should not be confused with the Tyrolean Unterland, of which it forms only a part. The Lower Inn Valley has one of the largest metropolitan areas in Austria. Around 380,000 people (2001) live in a relatively small area between Innsbruck and Rosenheim. The highest population densities, in terms of people per square kilometre, occur in Innsbruck (3,149), Rum (2,982), Kufstein (2,374), Hall i.T.(2,210) and Rosenheim (1,977).

== Tyrolean Lower Inn Valley ==
Unlike the Upper Inn Valley, the Lower Inn Valley is very wide, densely settled and relatively industrialised. The South Bavarian dialects exhibit transition features into Middle Bavarian.

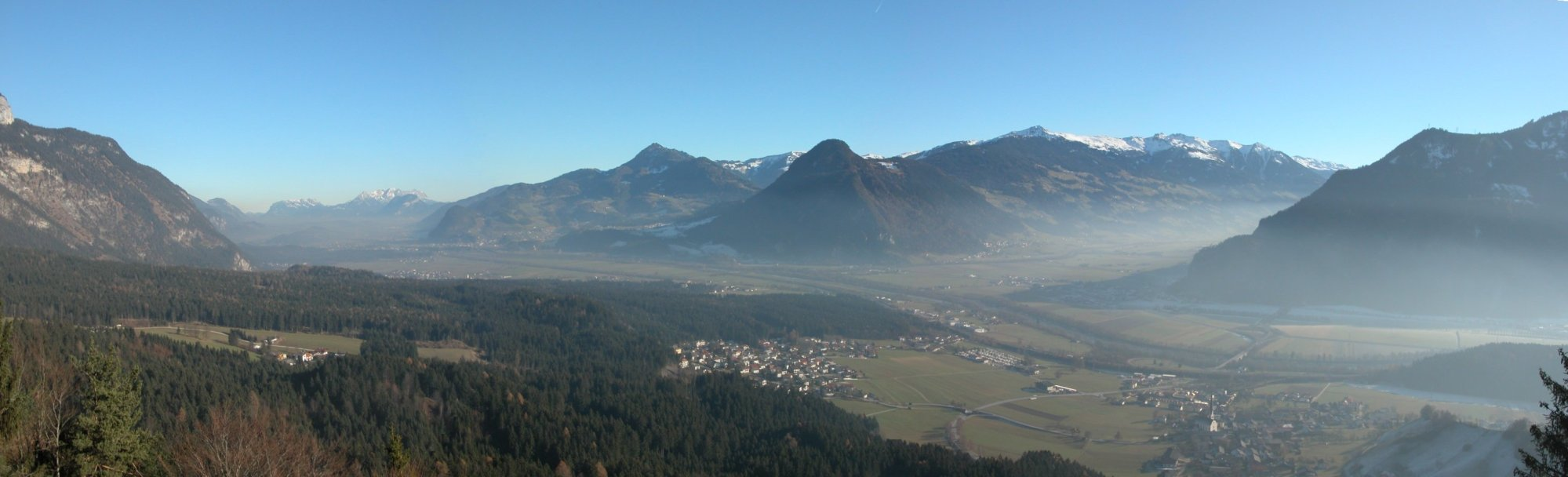
View of the Lower Inn Valley. In the right half of the picture is the mouth of the Zillertal (Ziller river valley).
