= Stumm =

- Municipality
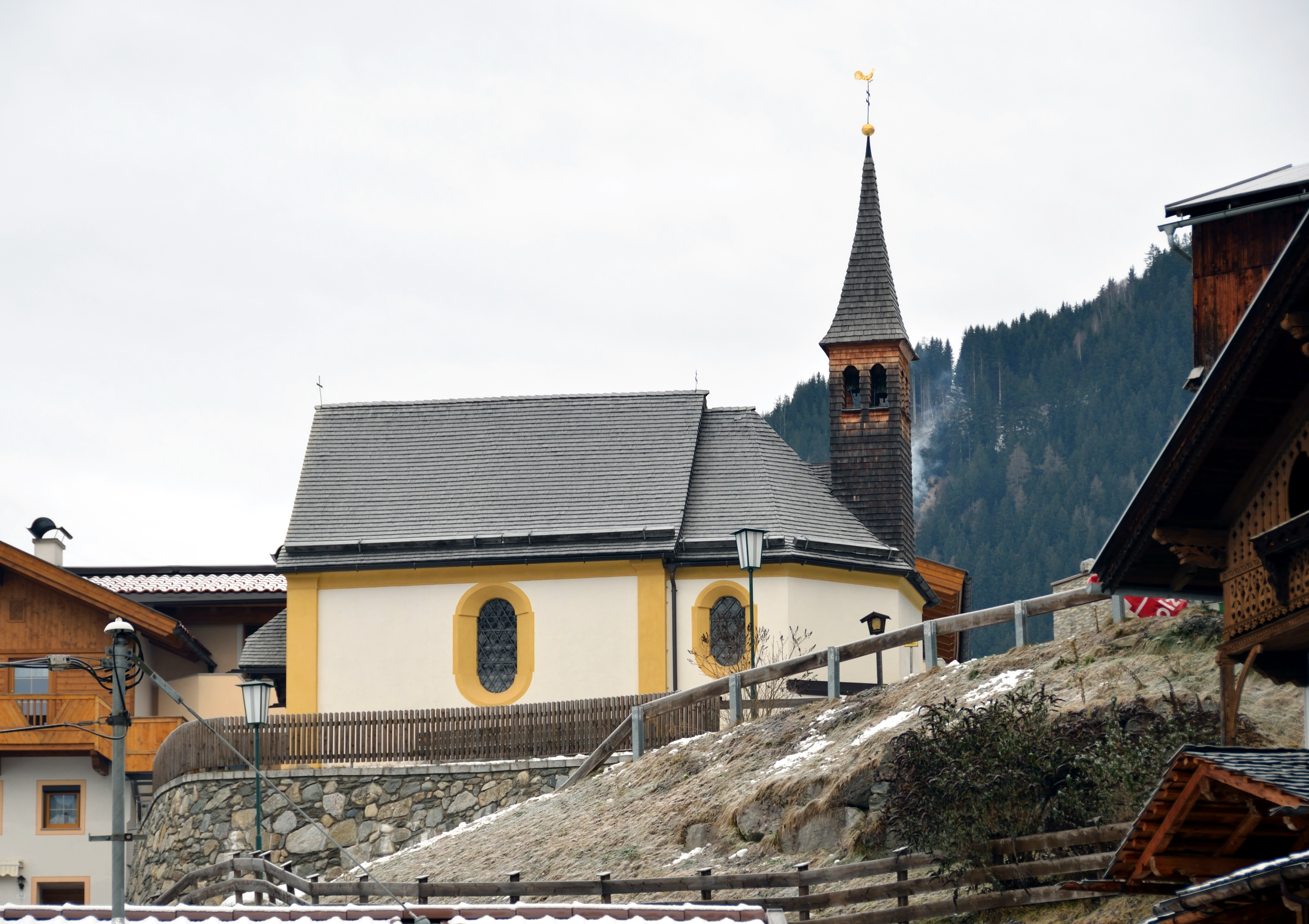

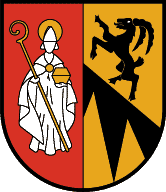
- Coat of arms

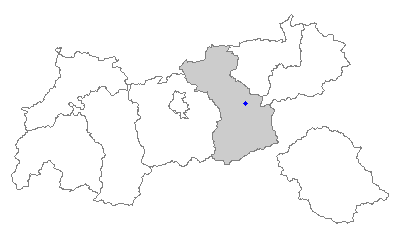
- Location within Tyrol

- Location within Austria
- Coordinates: 47°16′00″N 11°52′00″E
- Country: Austria
- State: Tyrol
- District: Schwaz

Government
  - Mayor: Alois Fasching (SPÖ)

Area
  - Total: 4.95 km^{2} (1.91 sq mi)
- Elevation: 556 m (1,824 ft)

Population (2021)
  - Total: 1,928
  - Density: 389/km^{2} (1,010/sq mi)
- Time zone: UTC+1 (CET)
  - Summer (DST): UTC+2 (CEST)
- Postal code: 6272
- Area code: 05283
- Vehicle registration: SZ
- Website: www.stumm. tirol.gv.at

Stumm is a municipality in the Schwaz district in the Austrian state of Tyrol.

== Geography ==
Stumm lies in the central Ziller valley on the right bank of the Ziller.

== Gallery ==
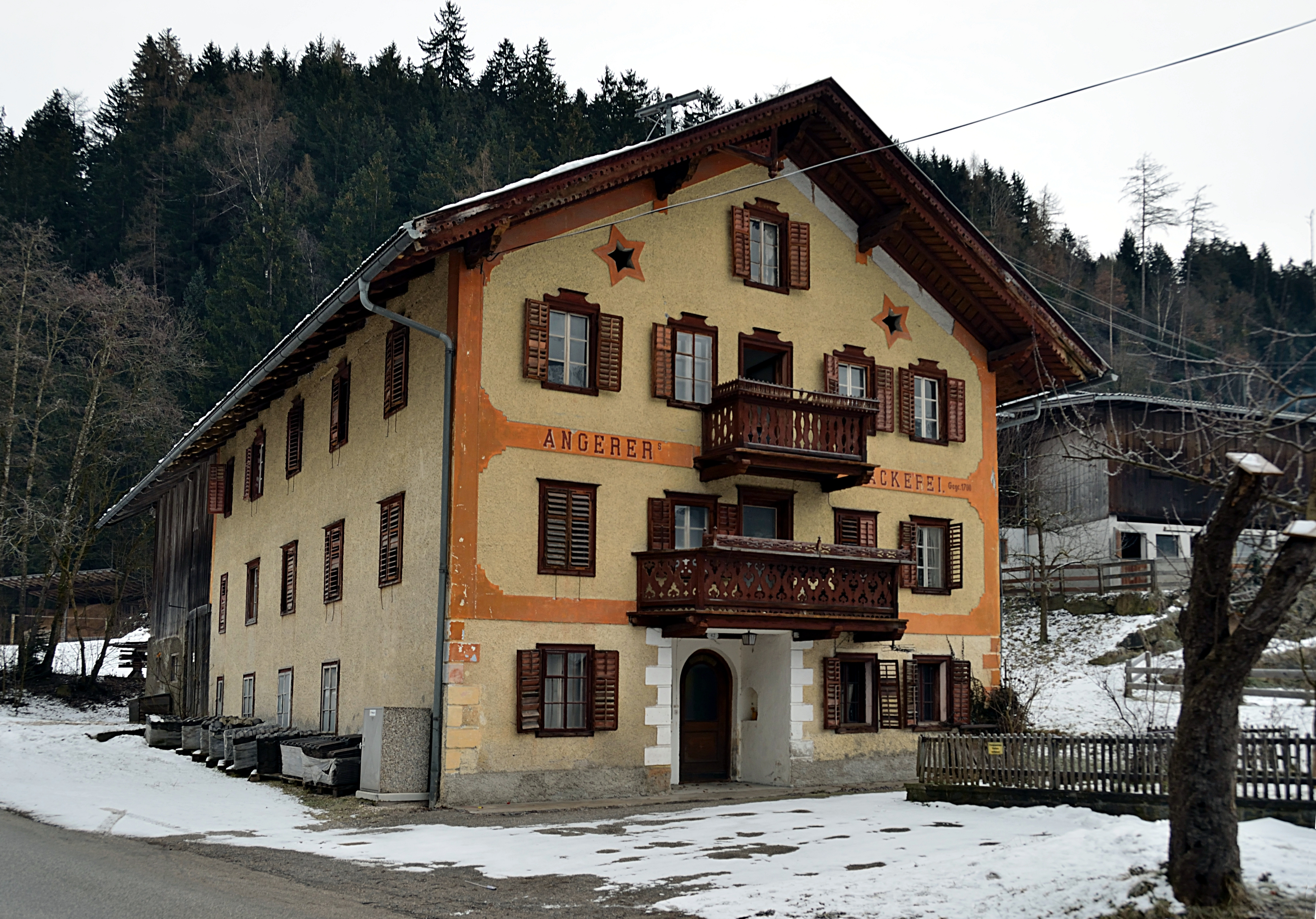
Angerer, Bäckerei, gegr. 1700 (Angerer, bakery, founded in 1700)
