= Bärenkopf (Karwendel) =

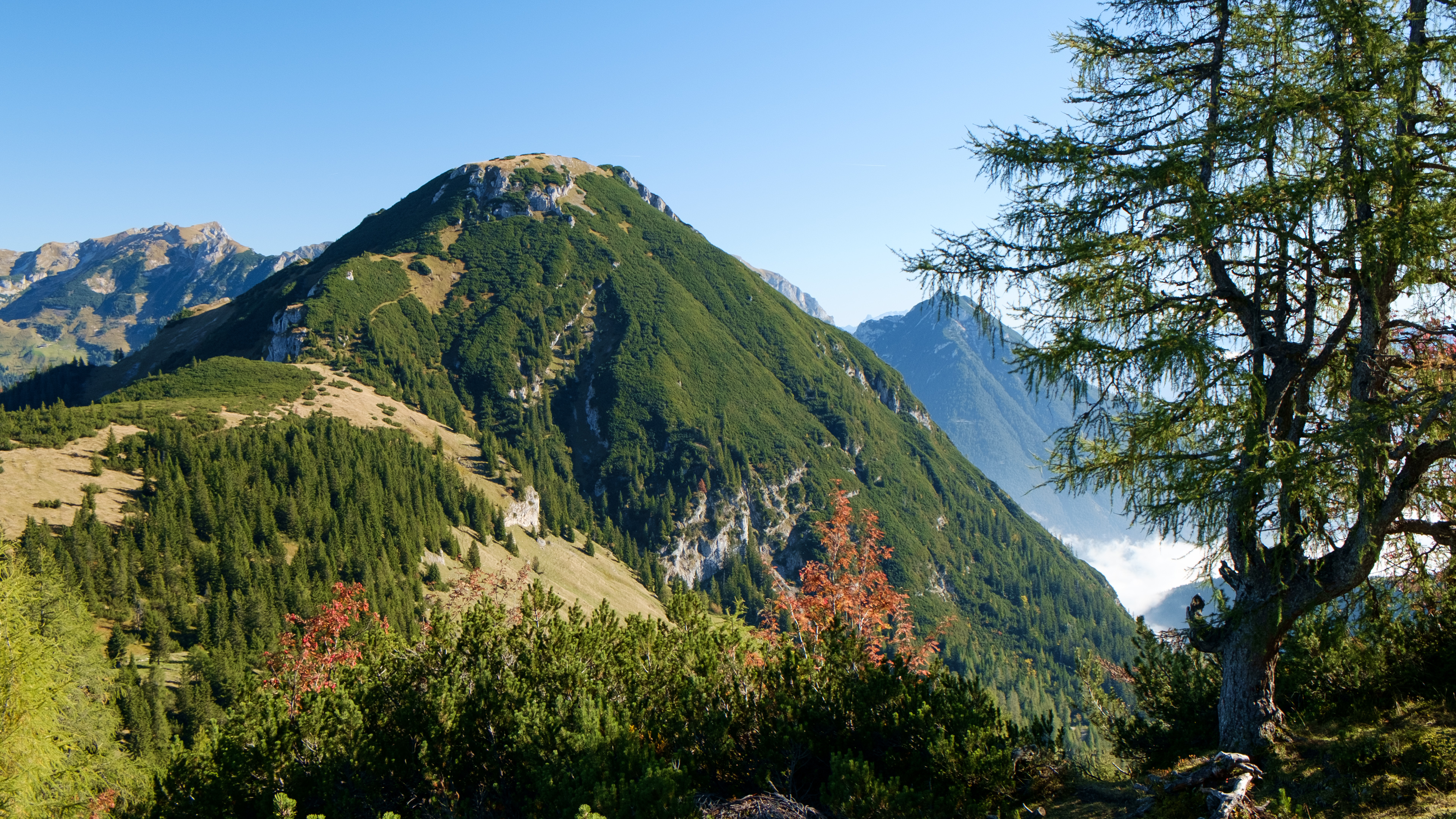
- Bärenkopf from the south

Highest point
- Elevation: 1,991 m (AA) (6,532 ft)
- Coordinates: 47°24′52″N 11°42′44″E

Geography
- Location within Tyrol, Austria
- Location: Tyrol, Austria
- Parent range: Rauer Knöll-Verzweigung

Geology
- Rock age: Triassic
- Rock types: Sedimentary rock of the Reichenhall-Formation and Wetterstein Formation

Climbing
- Easiest route: marked mountain hiking trail from Pertisau

The Bärenkopf is a mountain, 1,991 m (AA), in the Rauer Knöll-Verzweigung in the southeastern Karwendel south of Pertisau at the Achen Lake in Tyrol.

Mountain hikers reach the summit in a three-hour mountain hike from Pertisau. A few metres west of the summit plateau, a rock step and a further section of the trail with ropes are present.
