= Jenbach railway station =

Railway station in Tyrol, Austria

Jenbach
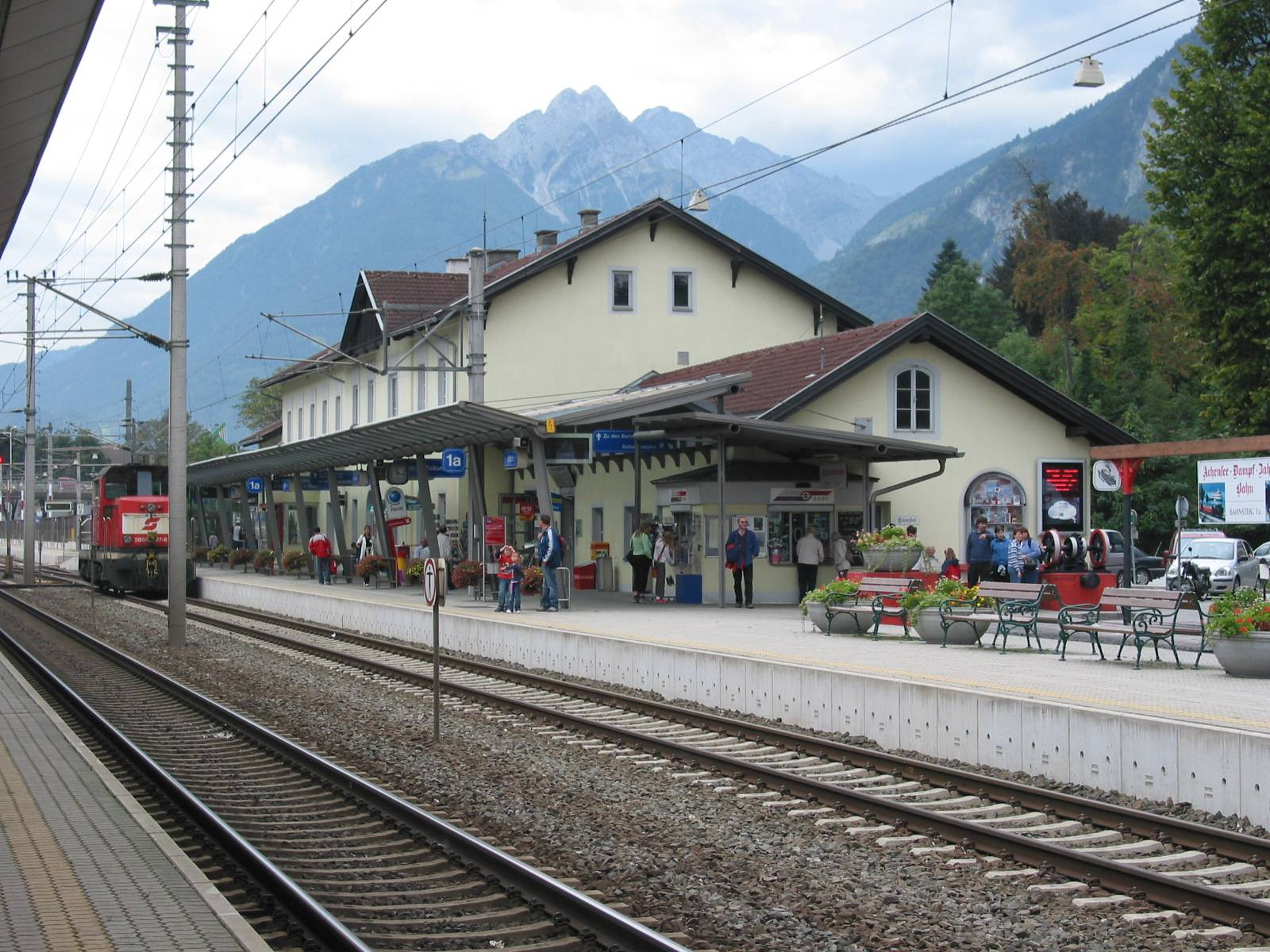
- The station building

General information
- Location: Bahnhofstraße 4; 6200 Jenbach; Austria
- Coordinates: 47°23′19″N 11°46′41″E
- Owner: Austrian Federal Railways (ÖBB)
- Operator: Austrian Federal Railways (ÖBB); Achensee Railway; Zillertalbahn
- Lines: Lower Inn Valley railway Achensee Railway; Zillertalbahn
- Platforms: 4 main lines 1 Achensee Railway; 1 Zillertalbahn

Services
Preceding station	DB Fernverkehr	Following station
Innsbruck Hbf Terminus	ICE 89	Wörgl Hbf towards München Hbf
Preceding station	ÖBB	Following station
Innsbruck Hbf towards Zürich HB	EuroCity (Transalpin)	Wörgl Hbf towards Graz Hbf
Innsbruck Hbf Terminus	Nightjet	Wörgl Hbf towards Amsterdam Centraal or Hamburg-Altona
Preceding station	Tyrol S-Bahn	Following station
Stans (Tyrol) towards Telfs-Pfaffenhofen	S4	Münster-Wiesing towards Kufstein
Stans (Tyrol) towards Ötztal	S5	Terminus
Location
- Location within Tyrol, Austria Location within Austria

Jenbach railway station serves the municipality of Jenbach, in the Schwaz district of the Austrian federal state of Tyrol. It is the only station in Austria at which railway lines of three different gauges meet.

The most important line leading to Jenbach station is the Austrian Federal Railways (ÖBB) standard gauge Lower Inn Valley railway, which passes through the station. Jenbach also has two terminating narrow gauge lines - the metre gauge Achensee Railway, and the 760 mm (2 ft 5 15/16 in) gauge Zillertalbahn. The station is 2,437 metres (7,995 ft) long, has 5 main lines, 7 sidings and 3 private sidings.

== Connections ==
The Lower Inn Valley Railway connects Jenbach with the main Austrian railway network. It therefore provides fast east-west links from (Budapest–) Vienna, and Salzburg to Innsbruck, Feldkirch and Bregenz or Zürich and Basel, and north-south links from (Berlin-) Munich to Innsbruck, Verona, Milan/Rome/Venice. Additionally there are links from Graz to Innsbruck and Bregenz.

The Zillertal is connected at Jenbach, via the Zillertalbahn, with the ÖBB main line. On the Zillertalbahn, there are not only regional trains but also regular steam-hauled special trains, which represent a great attraction, especially for tourists.

The Achensee Railway is a pure tourist railway and has no significance for commuter traffic. The roughly 7-kilometre (4.3 mi) long rack railway leads, via two stops, to the Seespitz railway station on the Achensee, and is operated by steam locomotives. In Seespitz, passengers can transfer directly to one of the Achensee ships.

== Train services ==
The station is served by the following service(s):

- RailJet services Bregenz - Innsbruck - Salzburg - Linz - St Pölten - Vienna

== Gallery ==
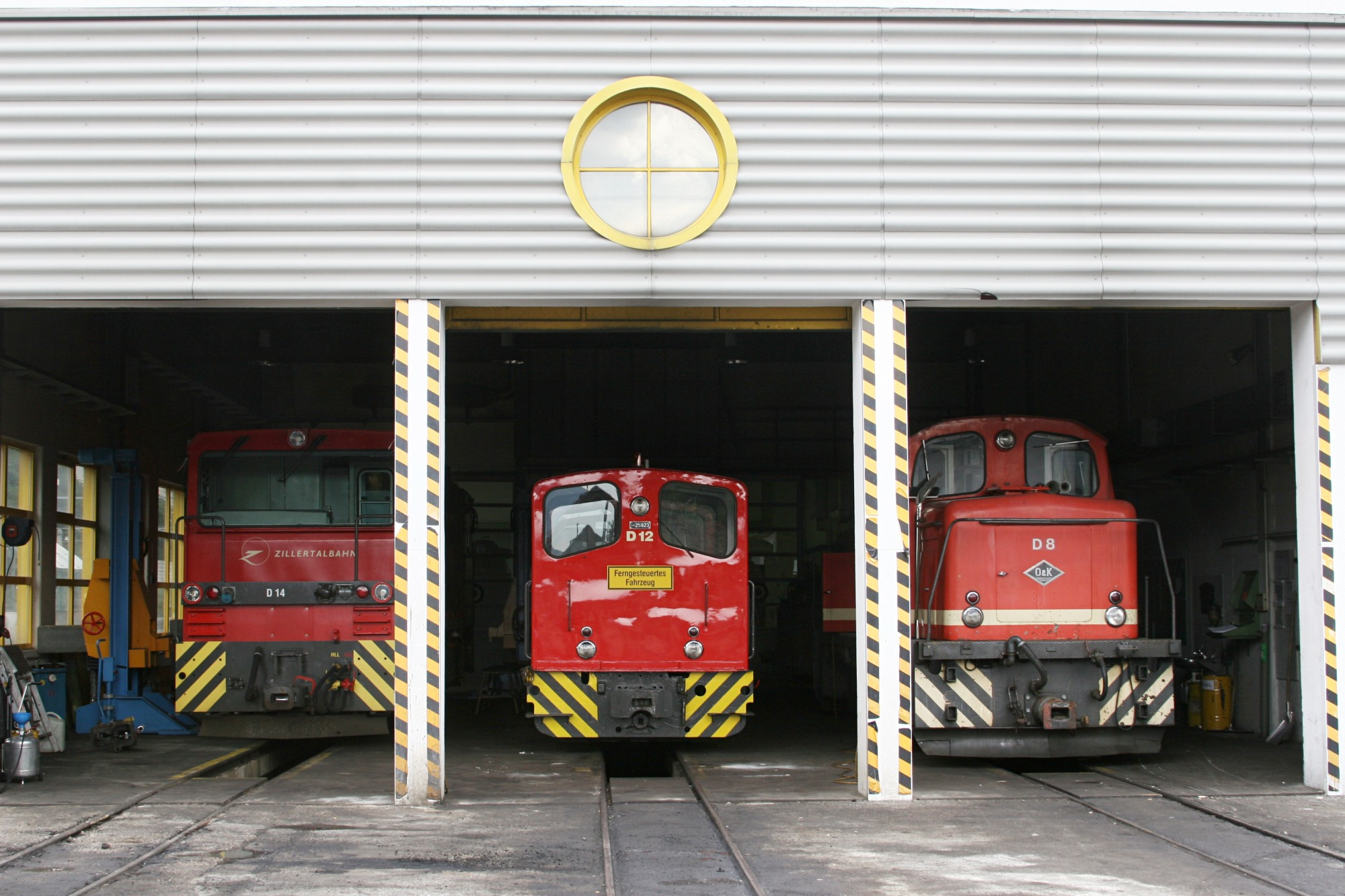
Zillertalbahn engine shed.

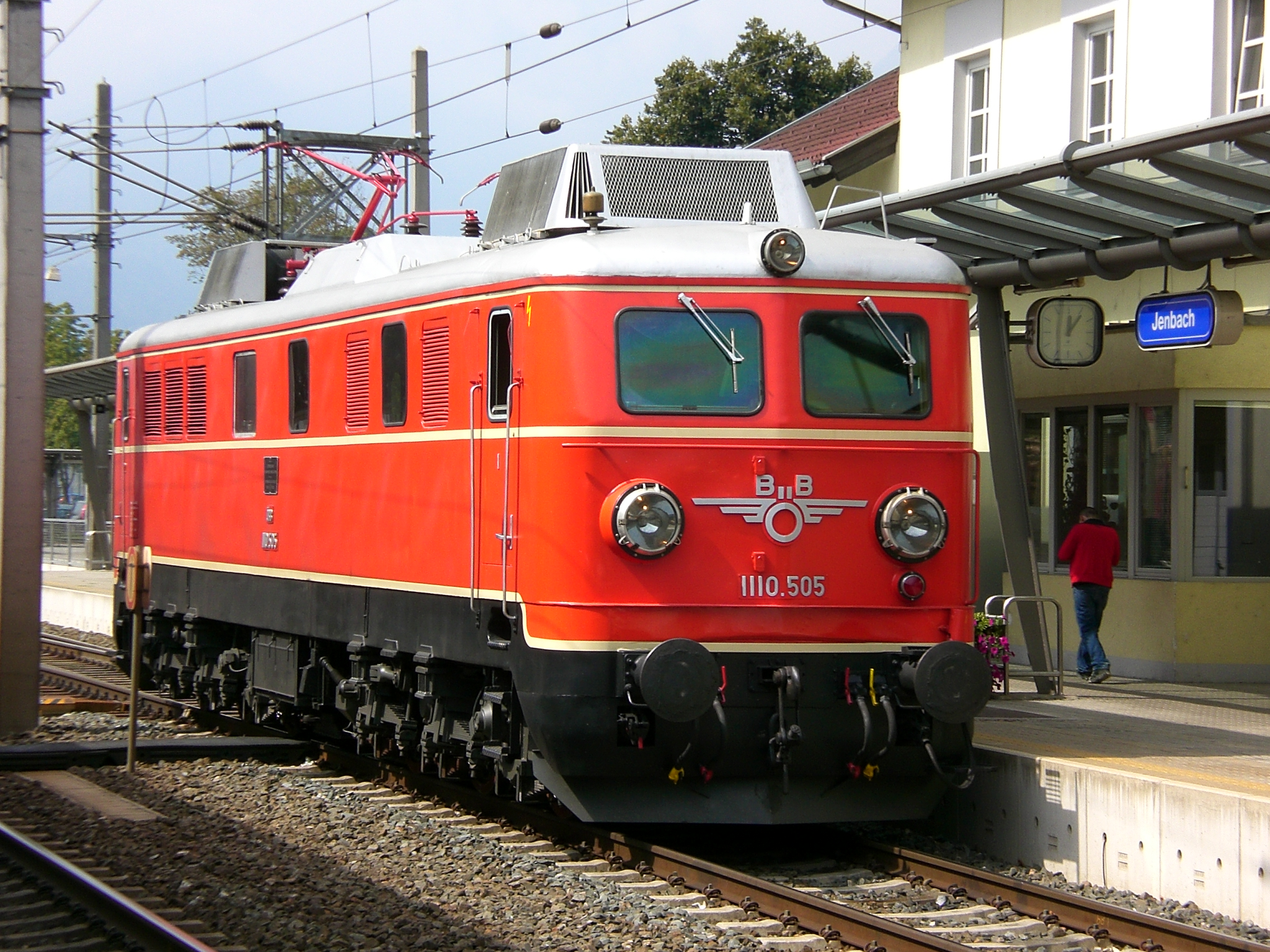
Heritage loco in front of the station building.

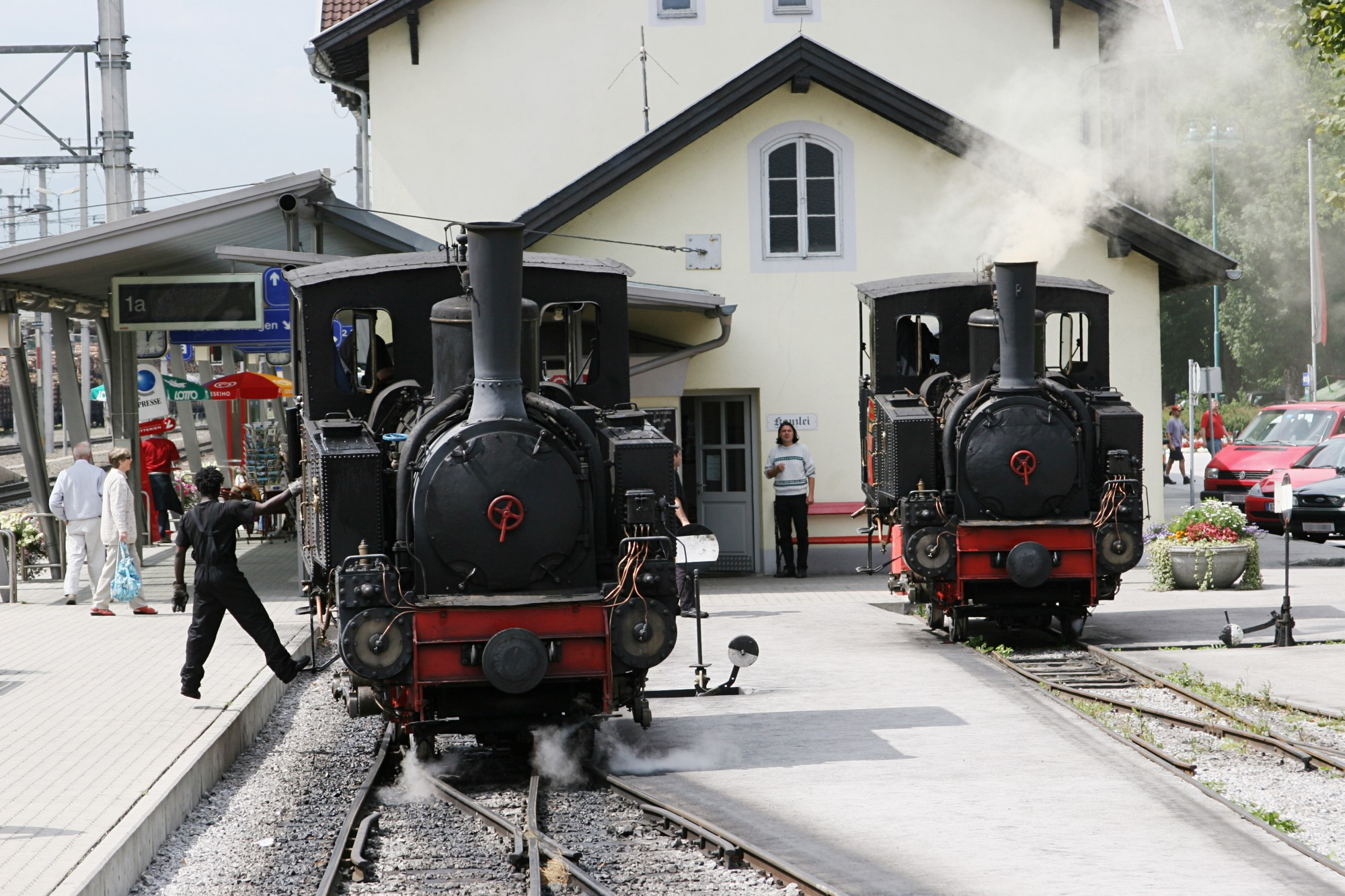
Two steam locomotives at the Achensee Railway platform.

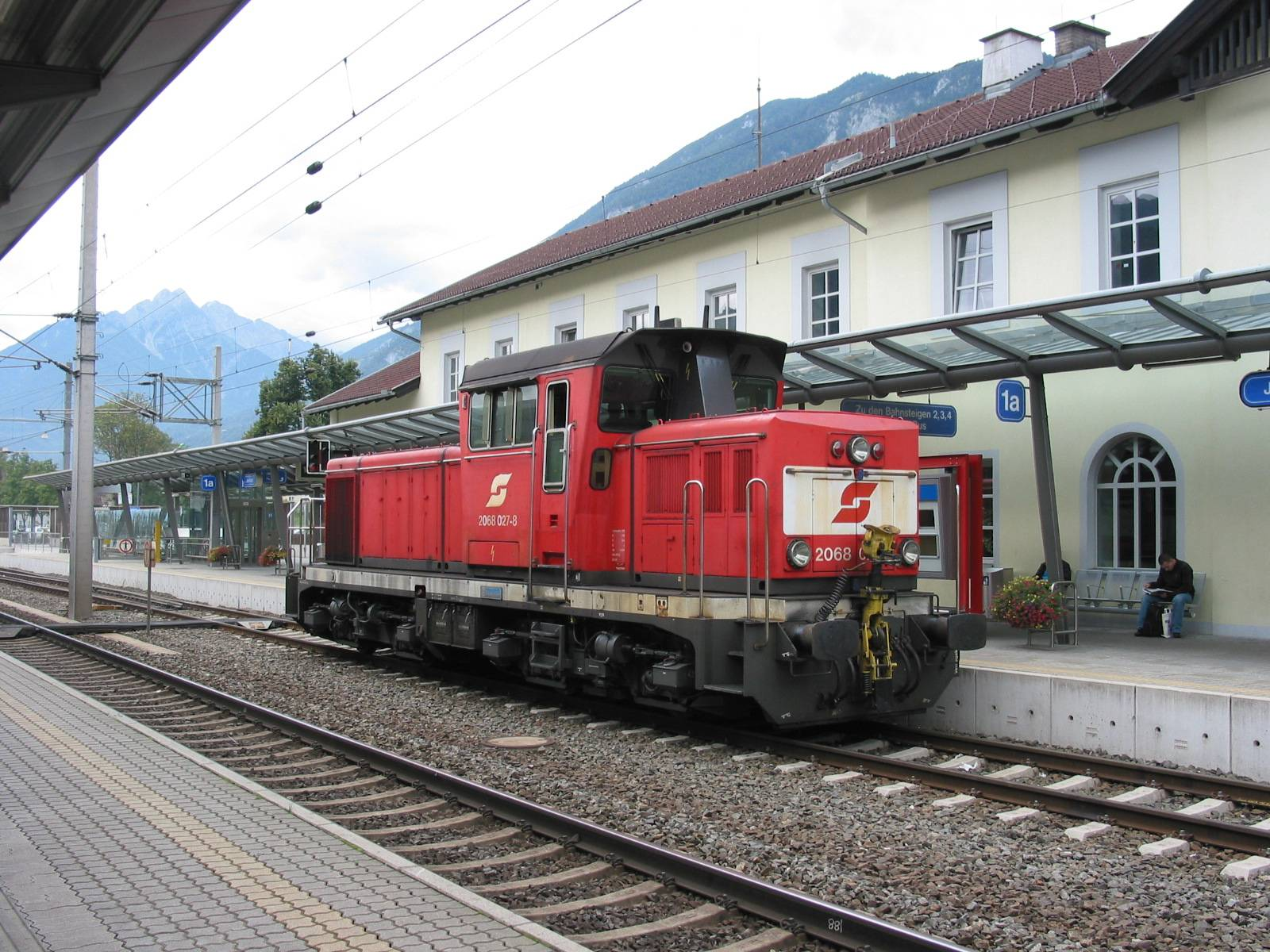
Class 2068 shunting loco, built in Jenbach.

== See also ==
- Austrian Federal Railways
- Achensee Railway
- Rail transport in Austria
- Zillertalbahn
