= Zillertal Railway =

Narrow gauge railway line in Austria

Coordinates: 47°13′53″N 11°52′53″E

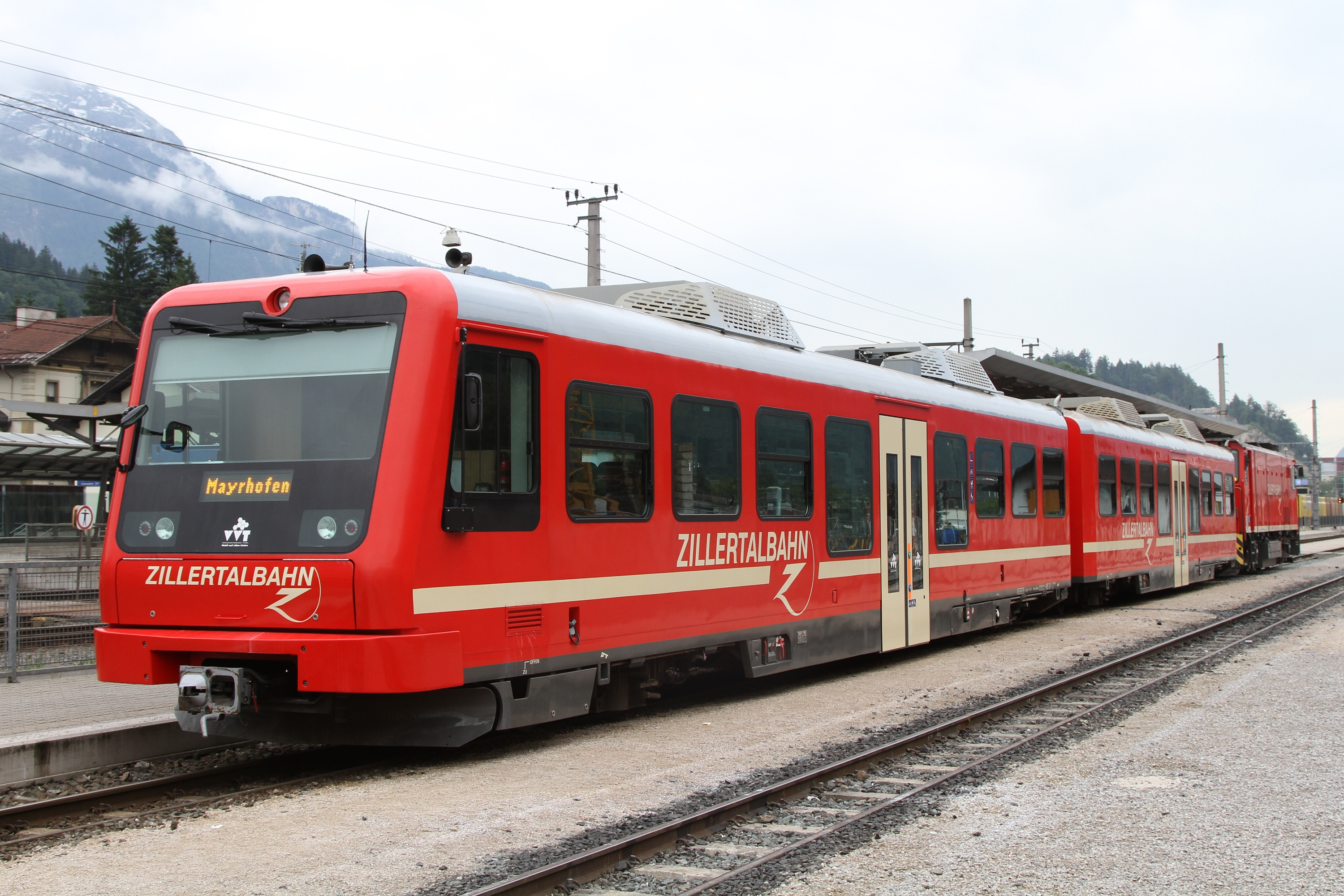
- Low-floor train at Jenbach railway station

Overview
- Locale: Zillertal
- Termini: Jenbach; Mayrhofen

History
- Opened: 1902

Technical
- Line length: 31.7 km (19.7 mi)
- Track gauge: 760 mm (2 ft 5 15/16 in)

The Zillertal Railway or Zillertalbahn is a 760 mm (2 ft 5 15/16 in) gauge independent railway running along the valley of the river Ziller (Zillertal) in Tyrol, Austria. The 32 kilometres (20 mi) line starts in Jenbach and terminates in Mayrhofen.

== Background ==
Running through a valley in a high-amenity rural area, the line is used by tourists and for commuter transport by local people. It is known because of its use of steam engines and its small track gauge.

Most of the passenger train services operate using modern diesel locomotives and railcars but the Zillertal Railway also has several steam locomotives which are used with heritage verandah rolling stock for special trains targeting tourists. Goods traffic is carried; standard gauge wagons to and from the main line network are carried on transporter wagons.

In Jenbach the Zillertal Railway meets the ÖBB standard gauge line between Salzburg and Innsbruck and the metre gauge Achensee Railway. Jenbach is the only location in Austria where railways of three different track-gauges meet.

== History ==
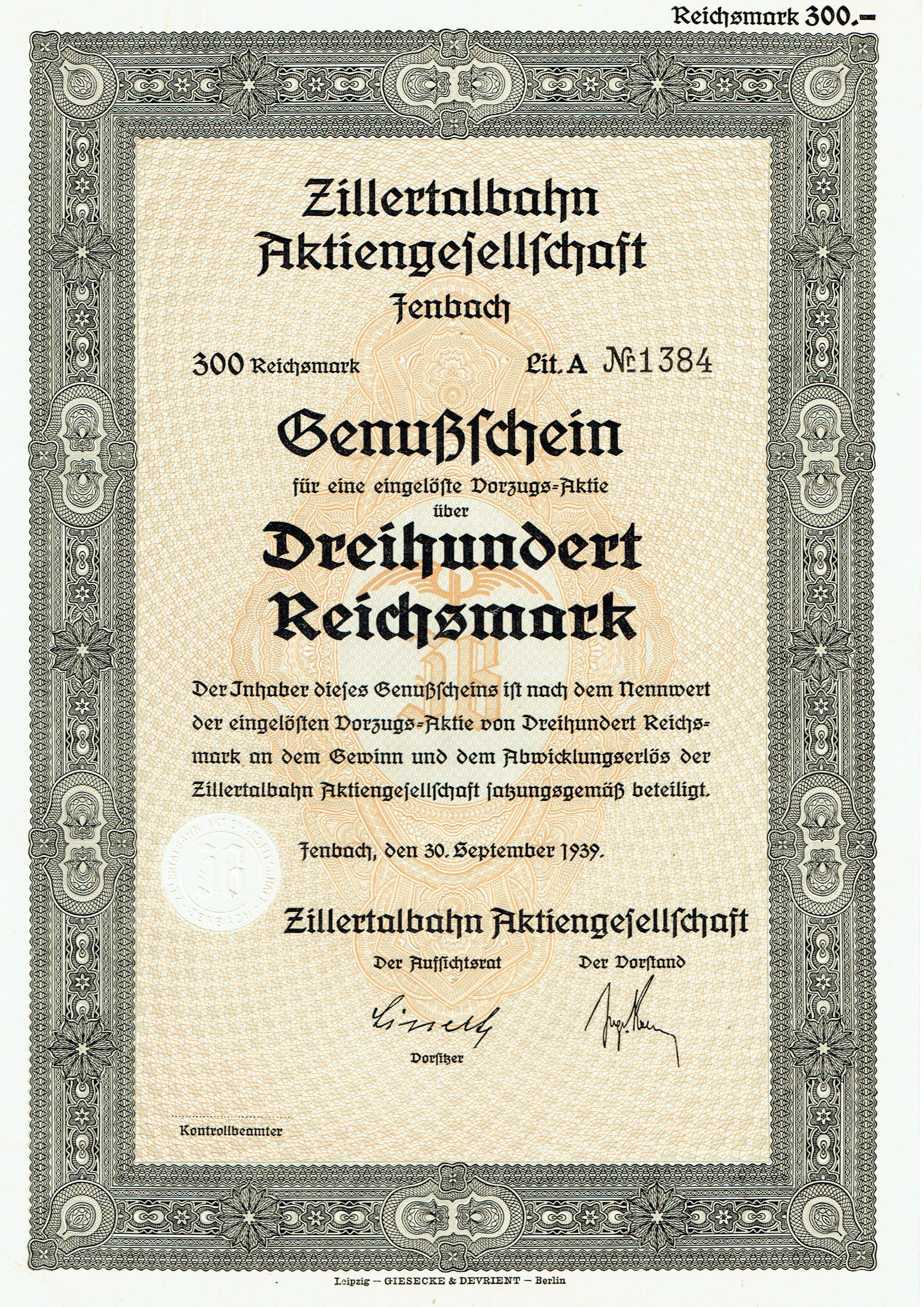
Participation certificate of the Zillertal Railway, issued 30 September 1939

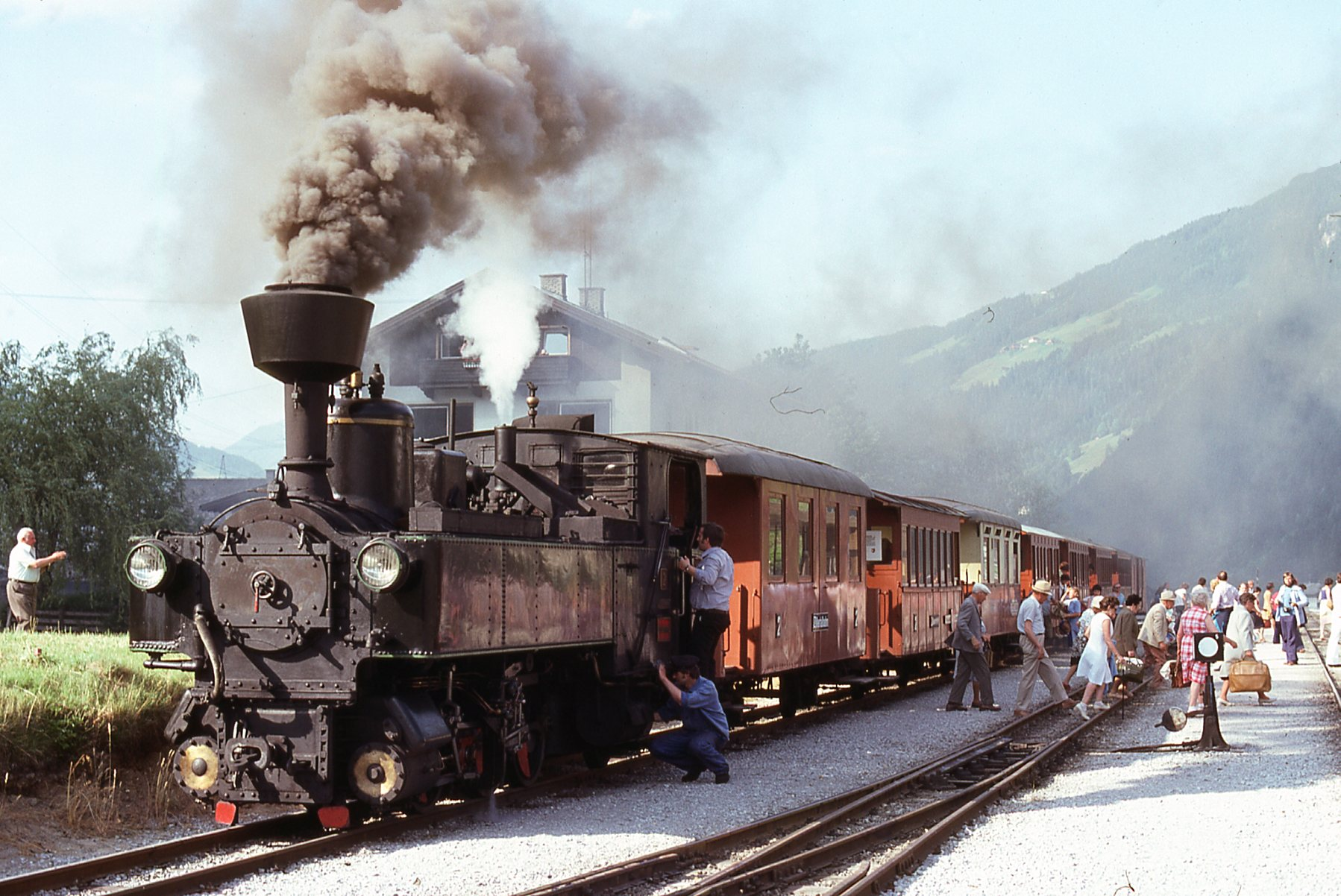
Steam train at Mayrhofen im Zillertal station (1970s)

The line was opened on 31 July 1902, serving the needs of residents of the upper Ziller valley and giving them access to Jenbach and the main line railway in the Inn Valley.

In 1956 the present day company name, Zillertaler Verkehrsbetriebe AG, (i.e. The Zillertaler Transport Company) was adopted when the company absorbed a local bus operation that had been founded in 1935.

In 1965 the line was extended by 2.5 km (1.6 mi) to bring materials and equipment to a power station; the extension line has subsequently been removed once more. However at that time two diesel locomotives and some transporter wagons were acquired and the Zillertalbahn became the first railway in Austria to use "Zugfunk"—train control by radio.

In 1976 extraction of magnesium ore from Tux came to an end; this traffic had been an important source of income for the line since 1928.

Since 2005, points on the line have been operated remotely from the Jenbach Control Centre using fibre-optic technology.

== Route ==
As a consequence of the valley's shape, the railway follows the river Ziller, as does the main road (Zillertalstraße). Both road and rail remain mostly on the eastern "right" bank. It is single track for most of the route, broadening to two or even three tracks in some stations. Road crossings are mostly level, some protected by barriers.

The sections Ramsau–Hippach–Zell am Ziller (3.33 km (2.07 mi)) and Kaltenbach-Stumm–Angersbach–Ahrnbach (2.0 km (1.2 mi)) have been made double track.

At Fügen-Hart there is a siding to serve a timber company.

== Current operation ==
In 2010 the annual freight traffic amounted to 320,000 tonnes, predominantly in connection with the forest products industry. 1.54 million passengers were carried in that year, a half-hourly service (of train and bus journeys combined) being introduced.

== Rolling stock to the United Kingdom ==
Some of the Zillertal Railway's redundant rolling stock was donated by the railway to the Welshpool and Llanfair Light Railway in Wales. In July 2019 the Welshpool & Llanfair Light Railway announced that it had signed a contract with the Zillertalbahn to hire newly overhauled U-class 0-6-2T locomotive, No. 2 'Zillertal', for approximately two years.

== Ownership ==
The Zillertaler Verkehrsbetriebe AG (ZVB) is (2010) owned by the Jenbach Marktgemeinde (i.e. local government unit) and other local communities (61%); individual shareholders (34%); and the Austrian state (5%).

== Future ==
In 2018, the ZVB unveiled its plans to move away from the ageing diesel trainsets in favour of hydrogen-powered units by 2025. The Zillertalbahn was to be the first fully hydrogen-powered small-gauge railway in the world. Hydrogen will be produced locally in Mayrhofen, where fuelling will take place in an all-new station. The five hydrogen-fuelled trainsets were set to achieve operational status by 2022, but financing issues postponed operation. In 2024, the project was abandoned and battery electric trains will be purchased instead.

Plans for an alteration of the trajectory were also announced. A two mile section from Aschau to Zell am Ziller will be replaced by a alignment that more closely follows the Ziller River and directly connects to the Zillertaler ARENA skiing lifts near Zell am Ziller. Moreover, the historic Zillerbrücke will be bypassed and is destined for use by pedestrians and cyclists only. The section that runs through Zell am Ziller will be levelled and incorporated into the road.
