= Mlaka pri Kočevju =

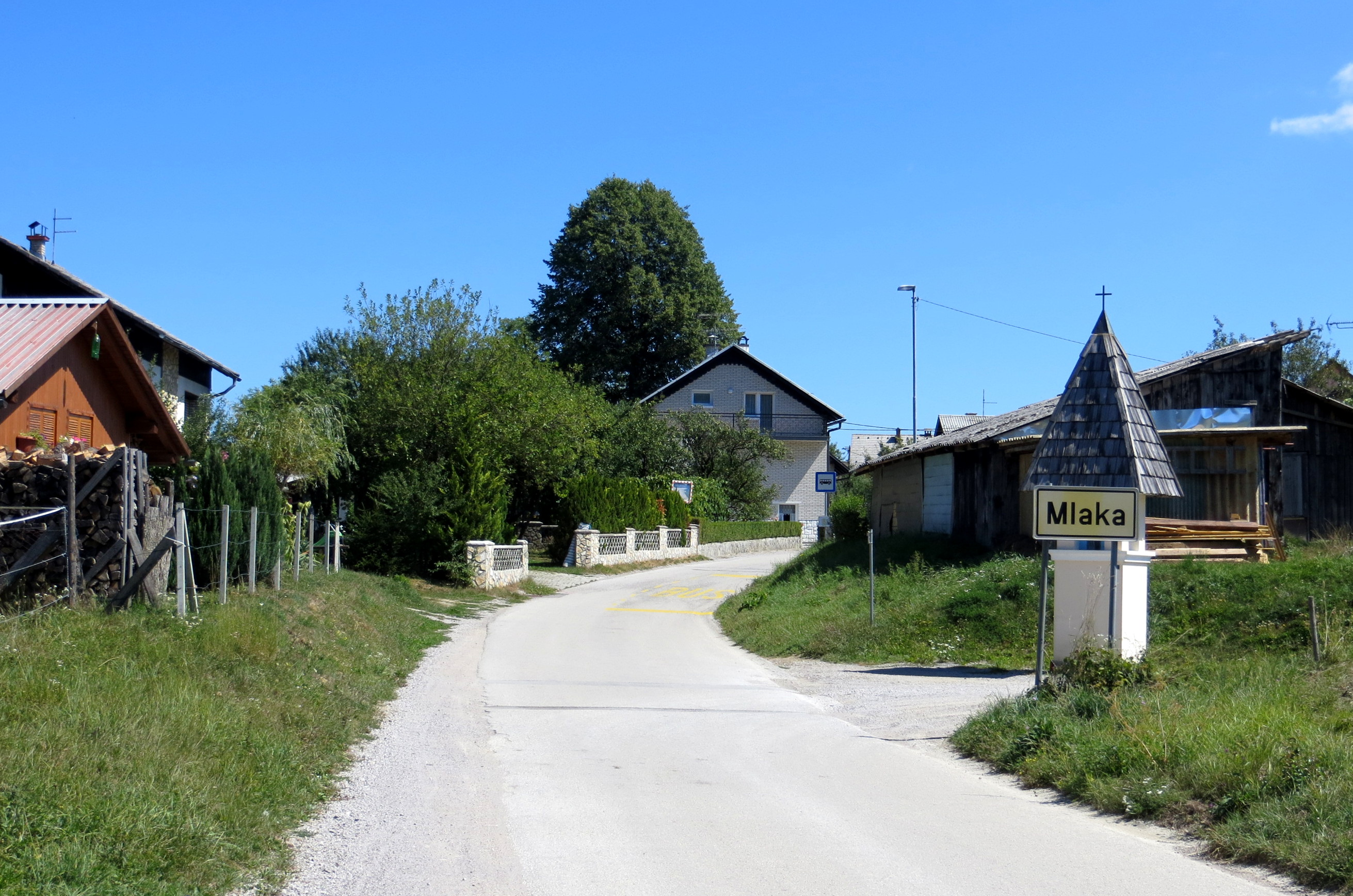

- Location in Slovenia
- Coordinates: 45°39′45.56″N 14°50′58.49″E
- Country: Slovenia
- Traditional region: Lower Carniola
- Statistical region: Southeast Slovenia
- Municipality: Kočevje

Area
  - Total: 1.46 km^{2} (0.56 sq mi)
- Elevation: 479.1 m (1,572 ft)

Population (2002)
  - Total: 287
- Postal code: 1332

Mlaka pri Kočevju (pronounced [ˈmlaːka pɾi kɔˈtʃeːu̯ju]; German: Kerndorf, Gottscheerish: Kearndoarf) is a settlement north of the town of Kočevje in southern Slovenia. The area is part of the traditional region of Lower Carniola and is now included in the Southeast Slovenia Statistical Region.

== Name ==
The name of the settlement was changed from Mlaka to Mlaka pri Kočevju in 1953. The name Mlaka is derived from the Slovene common noun mlaka 'pond', referring to the village pond. Petschauer suggests that the German name Kerndorf may be derived from a surname, Kern, or that it may derive from Middle High German kurn (dialect kirn) 'quern'.

== History ==
Mlaka pri Kočevju was a Gottschee German village. In the land registry of 1574, it had five full farms divided into 10 half-farms, corresponding to a population of 60 to 65. In the 1770 census the settlement had 28 houses. In 1936, there were 46 houses in the settlement, with a population of 164. The village economy at this time was based on farming, hauling timber, lumber, and firewood, gathering berries, peddling, and selling milk and butter in the nearby town of Kočevje. The original inhabitants (77 ethnic Germans from at least 19 houses) were evicted during the Second World War, between 4 and 12 January 1942. The buildings in the village survived the war in relatively good condition and the population continued to grow after the war, reaching a maximum of 308 in 2000.

== Religious heritage ==
The village church was dedicated to Saints Phillip and James and dated from 1677. It was a picturesque building with a bell-gable and a large portico. The main altar was created by Franz Götzl in 1841, and the side altar, dedicated to Saint Andrew, dated to 1862. Next to it, there was a chapel dedicated to Saint Notburga. The church fell into disrepair and was demolished after 1966. Its two bells were scrapped, and the stones from the church were reused to build nearby houses. A chapel-shrine at the southern edge of the village was razed in 1963. A replacement, dedicated to Saint Peter, was built by Peter Požar and it was dedicated on 29 June 2007. A second chapel-shrine, dedicated to Saints Phillip and James, was built about 100 m from the location of the old church and was dedicated on 25 July 2007.
