= Jenbach =

- Municipality
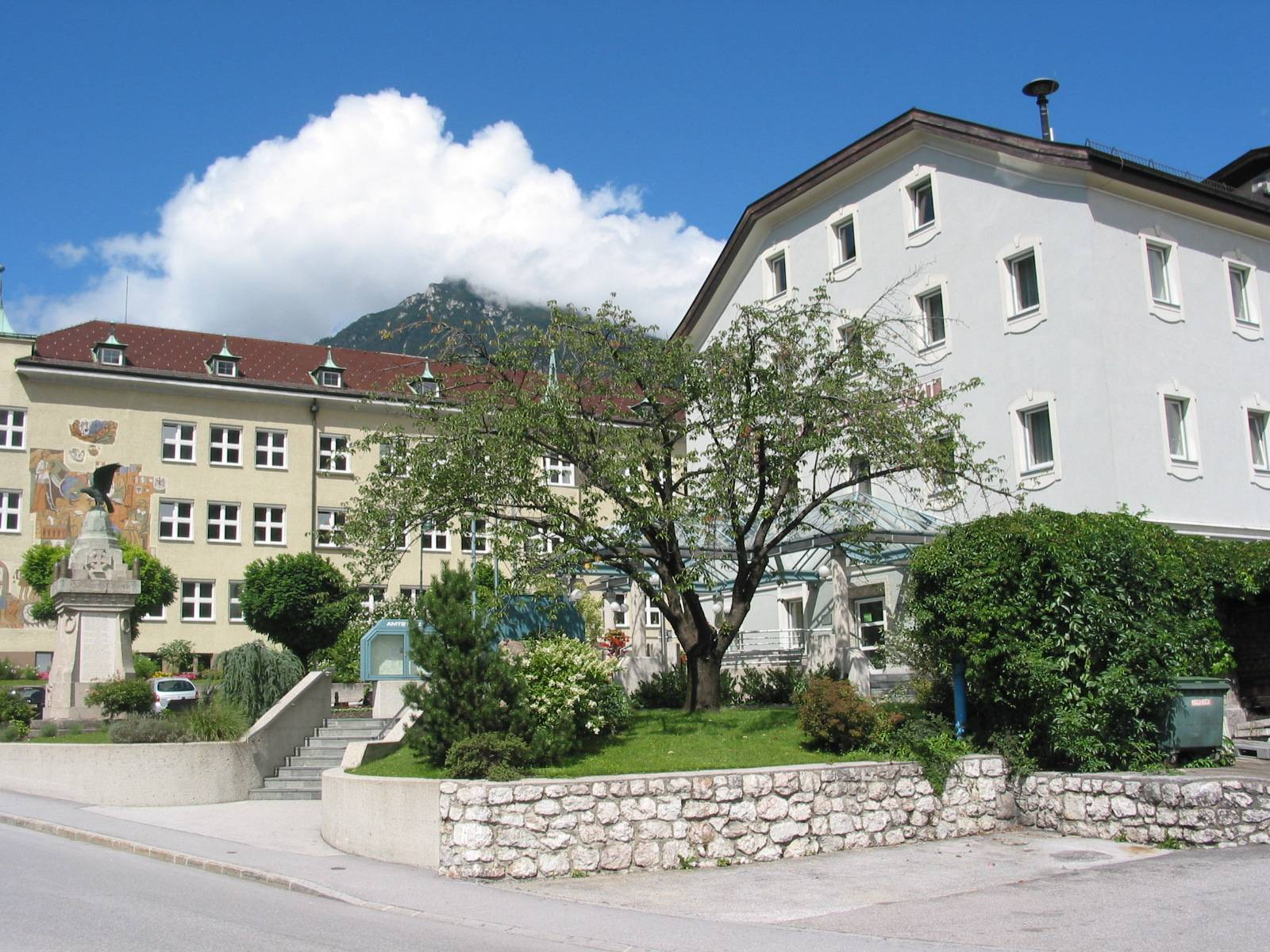
- Municipal office

- Coat of arms

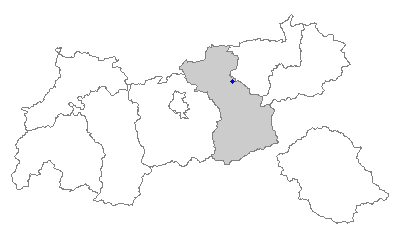
- Location in Tyrol

- Location within Austria
- Coordinates: 47°23′36″N 11°46′36″E
- Country: Austria
- State: Tyrol
- District: Schwaz

Government
  - Mayor: Dietmar Wallner (ÖVP)

Area
  - Total: 15.23 km^{2} (5.88 sq mi)
- Elevation: 563 m (1,847 ft)

Population (2018-01-01)
  - Total: 7,120
  - Density: 467/km^{2} (1,210/sq mi)
- Time zone: UTC+1 (CET)
  - Summer (DST): UTC+2 (CEST)
- Postal code: 6200
- Area code: 05244
- Vehicle registration: SZ
- Website: https://www.jenbach.at/

Jenbach is a municipality in the district of Schwaz in the Austrian state of Tyrol.

== Etymology ==
Many inhabitants of Jenbach believe that the name "Jenbach" is derived from "Jenseits des Baches", which means "Beyond the brook", however earlier versions of the name, for instance "Umbach" suggest that it could also be derived from "Um den Bach [herum]", which means "Around the brook". This is consistent with Jenbach's history as a village built around the Kasbach. The inhabitants of Jenbach are called "Jenbacher". People speaking the Bavarian dialect pronounce "Jenbach" as "Jembåch" [jembɒx].

== Geography ==
=== Neighbouring municipalities ===
Buch bei Jenbach, Eben am Achensee, Stans, Wiesing.

== History ==
The earliest dwellings in Jenbach date back to the end of the early Bronze Age and the early La Tène culture. Jenbach was first officially named in a document of the year of 1269 as "Ymbach". From 1410 onwards the Fugger constructed furnaces in order to process the silver and copper ore dug from the mines near Schwaz. After these ores were mined out, the processing of iron ore took over. Until 1865 this early industrial infrastructure remained private, however afterwards the state took ownership. In 1870 the factory was resold to the Salzburg-Tiroler-Montangesellschaft. In 1881 Julius & Theodor Reitlinger purchased the factory from the company and modernised it. The company remained a possession of the family until 1938, when the son of Julius Reitlinger, Friedrich Reitlinger, committed suicide due to the Anschluss (the merging of Germany and Austria) in 1938. Afterwards it was taken over by the state and later resold to Ernst Heinkel under the Aryanization program. After 1945 the company was not returned to its former owners, but remained under public administration.

In February 1945 31 tons of bombs were dropped on the railway station during Operation Clarion in order to prevent the Reichsbahn from transporting war-material. This was necessary for the impending invasion of Germany and Austria. The air attack on Jenbach destroyed 35 houses and left 8 people dead.

During the war the Heinkel factories produced, under license, the Hellmuth Walter KG-designed liquid rocket motors for the Me 163B Komet, the first operational rocket engine powered combat aircraft; and other parts for the V-2 SRBM missiles fired at southern English cities during the final months of the Second World War.

In April and May, remainders of SS-units, among them the main staff of the SS-Reichsführer Heinrich Himmler, withdrew from the quickly advancing French units commanded by Charles de Gaulle, to Tyrol, which Nazi propaganda had portrayed as a "fortress in the Alps". SS-commanders encouraged their soldiers to fight "to the last bullet", but largely avoided direct confrontations. On 2 May, they withdrew to Bavaria, leaving an amount of weaponry in the Achensee. Mayor Somweber and a lieutenant of the Austrian resistance, Nentwich, negotiated with the SS to withdraw, and with the allies to end air raids on Jenbach.

Today the GE Jenbacher AG is the world-leading company in the production of gas engines.

== Population ==
Historical population
Year	Pop.	±%
1869	1,052	—
1880	1,150	+9.3%
1890	1,395	+21.3%
1900	1,645	+17.9%
1910	2,261	+37.4%
1923	2,261	+0.0%
1934	2,282	+0.9%
1939	2,257	−1.1%
1951	4,780	+111.8%
1961	5,479	+14.6%
1971	6,061	+10.6%
1981	5,712	−5.8%
1991	6,199	+8.5%
2001	6,006	−3.1%
2011	6,867	+14.3%

== Economy ==
Jenbach is an economically significant place due to the companies situated there: GE Jenbacher, Siko Solar, TIWAG, Katzenberger, Gubert, and Holz Binder. During the 20th century, the Jenbacher Werke (predecessor of today's GE Jenbacher) produced wagons, locomotives, motors and other goods. The Kasbach serves as a source of energy for several smaller water plants. Jenbach also has a high school specialised in mechanical and economical engineering.

== Transport ==
The railway station of Jenbach contains three different railways:

- The ÖBB (Österreichische Bundesbahnen) (Standard Gauge)
- The Achenseebahn (Metre Gauge) - Europe's oldest cog railway using the Riggenbach system, which is still steam operated
- The Zillertalbahn (760mm Gauge)

Jenbach is – due to its infrastructural importance – the only location in Austria where railways with three different gauges meet.

== Climate ==
The Köppen Climate Classification sub-type for this climate is "Dfb" (Warm Summer Continental Climate).

Climate data for Jenbach (1971–2000)
Month	Jan	Feb	Mar	Apr	May	Jun	Jul	Aug	Sep	Oct	Nov	Dec	Year
Record high °C (°F)	16.3 (61.3)	19.5 (67.1)	24.0 (75.2)	28.0 (82.4)	31.1 (88.0)	34.1 (93.4)	36.2 (97.2)	33.7 (92.7)	29.1 (84.4)	27.0 (80.6)	23.1 (73.6)	20.0 (68.0)	36.2 (97.2)
Mean daily maximum °C (°F)	3.0 (37.4)	5.4 (41.7)	10.6 (51.1)	14.5 (58.1)	20.0 (68.0)	22.0 (71.6)	24.1 (75.4)	23.8 (74.8)	20.3 (68.5)	15.1 (59.2)	7.5 (45.5)	3.3 (37.9)	14.1 (57.4)
Daily mean °C (°F)	−1.6 (29.1)	0.3 (32.5)	4.5 (40.1)	8.2 (46.8)	13.3 (55.9)	15.9 (60.6)	17.8 (64.0)	17.4 (63.3)	13.9 (57.0)	9.0 (48.2)	2.8 (37.0)	−0.7 (30.7)	8.4 (47.1)
Mean daily minimum °C (°F)	−4.7 (23.5)	−3.3 (26.1)	0.2 (32.4)	3.4 (38.1)	7.9 (46.2)	10.9 (51.6)	12.7 (54.9)	12.7 (54.9)	9.5 (49.1)	5.2 (41.4)	−0.1 (31.8)	−3.5 (25.7)	4.2 (39.6)
Record low °C (°F)	−20.7 (−5.3)	−19.6 (−3.3)	−16.3 (2.7)	−4.5 (23.9)	−3.0 (26.6)	2.4 (36.3)	3.3 (37.9)	3.9 (39.0)	−1.0 (30.2)	−5.6 (21.9)	−18.2 (−0.8)	−20.2 (−4.4)	−20.7 (−5.3)
Average precipitation mm (inches)	76.8 (3.02)	61.9 (2.44)	76.2 (3.00)	80.2 (3.16)	95.2 (3.75)	136.4 (5.37)	167.1 (6.58)	147.0 (5.79)	96.2 (3.79)	70.8 (2.79)	85.1 (3.35)	84.1 (3.31)	1,177 (46.34)
Average snowfall cm (inches)	30.3 (11.9)	31.0 (12.2)	14.6 (5.7)	2.8 (1.1)	0.0 (0.0)	0.0 (0.0)	0.0 (0.0)	0.0 (0.0)	0.0 (0.0)	0.0 (0.0)	10.5 (4.1)	27.6 (10.9)	116.8 (46.0)
Average precipitation days (≥ 1.0 mm)	8.9	7.7	10.2	10.2	11.8	14.8	15.1	14.9	10.6	8.8	9.7	9.3	132.0
Average relative humidity (%) (at 14:00)	69.2	61.0	52.7	48.9	47.9	52.6	53.6	56.0	57.2	58.7	66.9	73.6	58.2
Mean monthly sunshine hours	83.3	107.1	138.2	152.0	178.9	163.3	192.2	195.8	165.9	139.6	88.1	71.9	1,676.3
Percentage possible sunshine	39.0	47.9	46.2	45.0	48.0	44.7	52.4	56.4	52.9	52.4	42.4	38.5	47.2
Source: Central Institute for Meteorology and Geodynamics

== Sources ==
- Thomas Albrich/Arno Giesinger: Im Bombenkrieg, Tirol und Vorarlberg, 1943–1945, Seite 244
- Gemeindechronik von Jenbach
- History of Jenbach
- Local tourism information site
