= Pertisau =

Village in Tyrol, Austria

Coordinates: 47°26′25″N 11°41′43″E

Pertisau is a small village on the Achensee Lake in the Tyrol region of Austria.

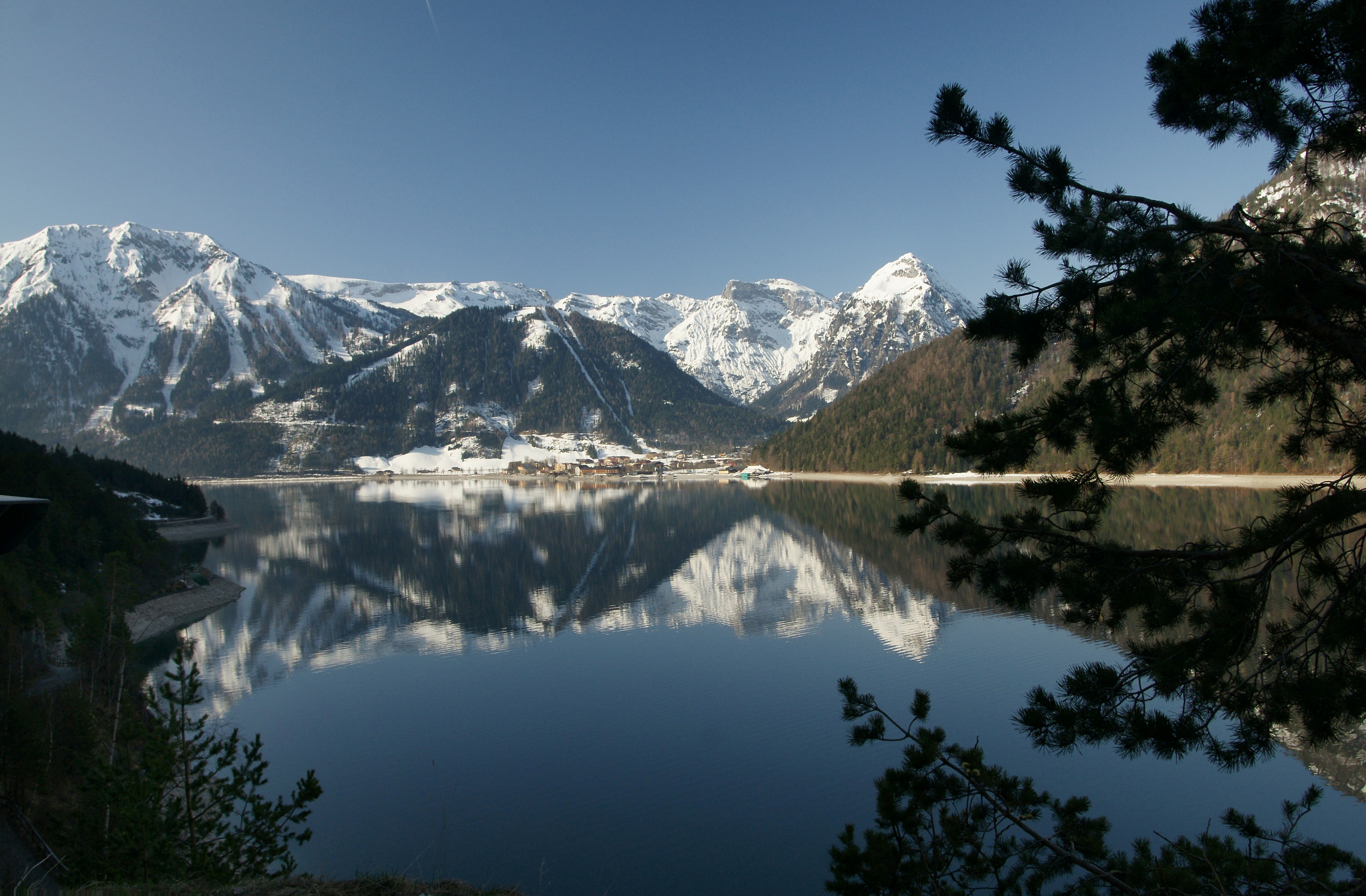
Pertisau

Pertisau is in the Schwaz (district). It is in the Karwendel Alpine Park, one of the oldest, cross-border, protected areas of the Eastern Alps.

== History ==
The parish church is the work of the Austrian architect Clemens Holzmeister. Pertisau is the location of the Fürstenhaus, a country residence of Maximilian I, Holy Roman Emperor.

== Industry ==
Pertisau is the centre for the Achensee shipping business. Ships start their journey along the lake from Pertisau and connect the villages around the lake with the Achenseebahn rack and pinion railway at Seespitz Station.

The village produces Tirolean mineral oil, an all-purpose tonic with a 100-year-old tradition of Tiroler Steinöl.

== Tourism ==
Above the town are two main winter ski areas, the Planberg Wiesenlifte, which has one easy trail, and the Karwendel Bergbahn, which has eight easy and eight intermediate trails. The town also has paragliding, kite-surfing, mountain biking, rafting, and diving, hiking, sailing, and cycling activities.

== The Chalet School series ==
Pertisau, under the name of Briesau am Tiernsee, is the setting for the first thirteen of the Chalet School series of books by Elinor Brent-Dyer, and part of the fourteenth, The Chalet School in Exile (1940). Brent-Dyer had visited the Tyrol in the 1920s. Nancy G. Rosoff and Stephanie Spencer have written that Brent-Dyer "used the setting of her fictional school in the Austrian Tyrol to give her readers some hard lessons about Nazi persecution". A plaque on the wall of the village bookshop commemorates her writing.
