= Eben am Achensee =

- Municipality
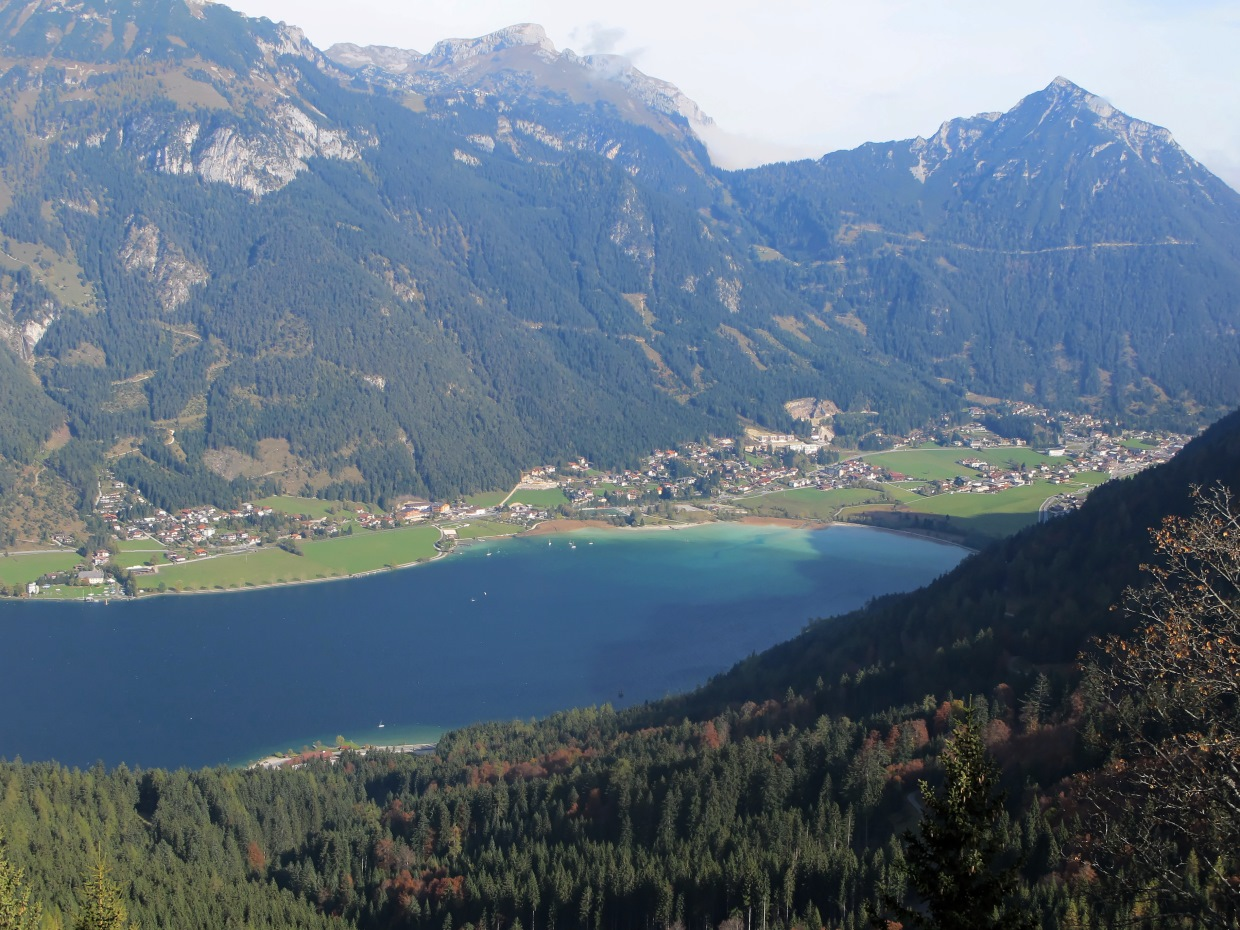
- The village of Maurach on the shores of Achensee lake

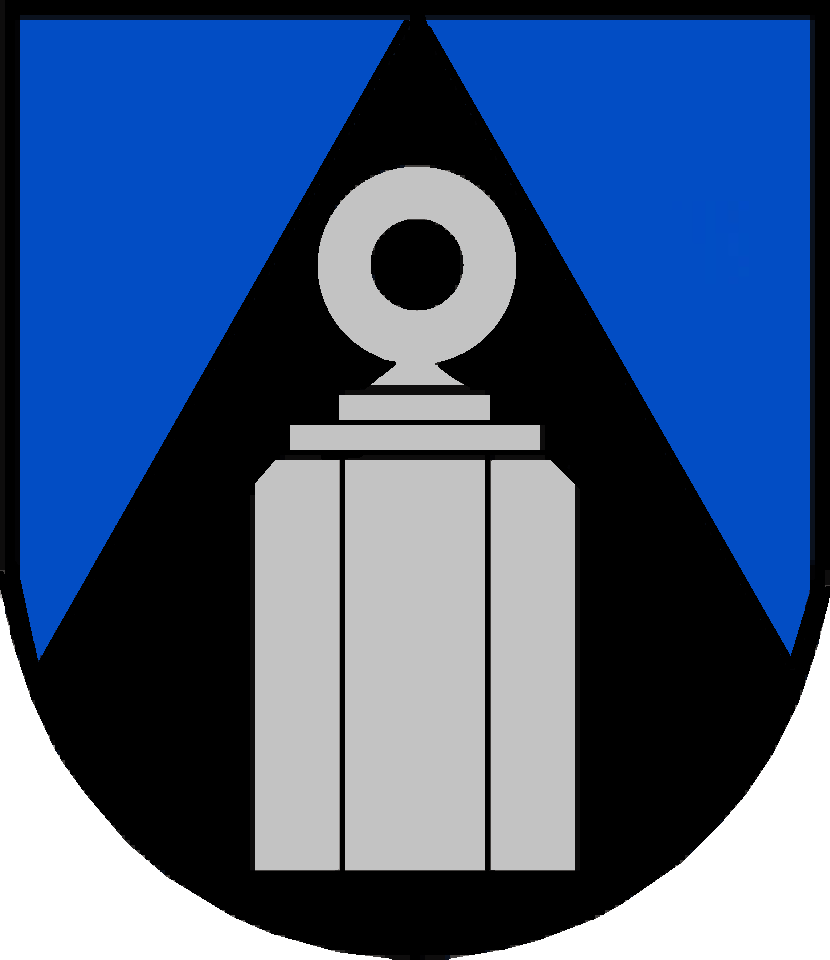
- Coat of arms

- Location within Austria
- Coordinates: 47°25′22″N 11°45′07″E
- Country: Austria
- State: Tyrol
- District: Schwaz

Government
  - Mayor: Josef Hausberger (unparteiische Namesliste)

Area
  - Total: 196.41 km^{2} (75.83 sq mi)
- Elevation: 940 m (3,080 ft)

Population (2018-01-01)
  - Total: 3,180
  - Density: 16.2/km^{2} (41.9/sq mi)
- Time zone: UTC+1 (CET)
  - Summer (DST): UTC+2 (CEST)
- Postal code: 6212 (Maurach), 6213 (Pertisau)
- Area code: 05243
- Vehicle registration: SZ
- Website: www.eben.tirol.gv.at

Eben am Achensee is a municipality in the Schwaz district in the Austrian state of Tyrol.

== Geography ==
Eben lies in the Achen valley on the shores of the Achensee above the lower Inn valley.

- Ortschaften: Bächental | Hinterriß | Maurach | Pertisau
- Dörfer: Maurach · Pertisau
- Rotten: Buchau · Hinterriß · Eben am Achensee · Rofangarten
- Siedlungen: Lärchenwiese | Zerstreute Häuser: Bächental
- Sonstige Ortslage: Erfurter Hütte · Gramaialm-Hochleger · Herzog-von-Coburg-Gotha-Jagdschloss · Herzoglicher Alpenhof · Plumsjochhütte · Prälatenhaus · Rotwandlhütte · Steinölbrennerei · Tölzer Hütte

== Notable residents ==
- Notburga, Roman Catholic saint, patron of peasants
