= Notburga =

Austrian saint (1265–1313)

Saint Notburga of Rattenberg
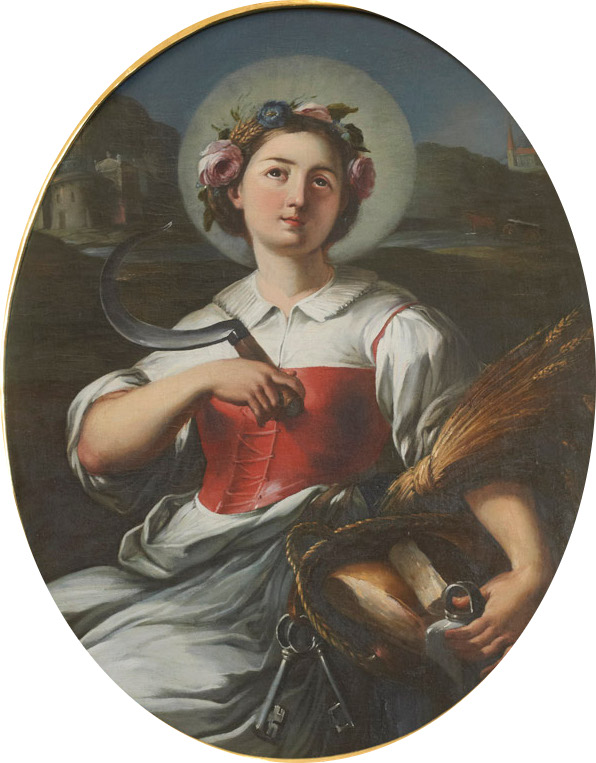
- The Baroque painting of Saint Notburga in the Church of the Assumption of the Virgin Mary on Bled Island, northwestern Slovenia

Virgin and Peasant
- Born: c. 1265; Rattenberg, Austria
- Died: September 13, 1313 (aged 47–48); Buch, Austria
- Venerated in: Catholic Church
- Canonized: 27 March 1862, Saint Peter's Basilica, Papal State by Pope Pius IX
- Major shrine: Shrine of Saint Notburga, Chapel of Saint Rupert, Eben, Austria
- Feast: 13 September, sometimes 14 September
- Attributes: Ear of corn, or flowers and a sickle in her hand; sometimes the sickle is suspended in the air
- Patronage: Rural Youth; Servants; Peasants

Notburga (c. 1265 – 13 September 1313), also known as Notburga of Rattenberg or Notburga of Eben, was an Austrian saint and peasant from Tyrol. Numerous vitae have been written about her and painted of her where she is depicted with a scythe. She is venerated by the Catholic Church, having been canonized by Pope Pius IX.

== Life ==
Notburga was born about 1265 at Rattenberg on the Inn river. She was a cook in the household of Count Henry of Rattenberg, and used to give food to the poor. But Ottilia, her mistress, ordered her to feed any leftover food to the pigs. To continue her mission, Notburga began to save some of her own food, especially on Fridays, and took it to the poor.

According to her legend, one day her master met her and commanded her to show him what she was carrying. She obeyed but instead of the food he saw only shavings, and instead of wine, vinegar. As a result of Notburga's actions, Ottilia dismissed her, but soon fell dangerously ill. Notburga remained to nurse her and prepared her for death.

Next, Notburga worked for a peasant in Eben am Achensee, on the condition that she be permitted to go to church evenings before Sundays and festivals. One evening her master urged her to continue working in the field. Throwing her sickle into the air she supposedly said: "Let my sickle be judge between me and you," and the sickle remained suspended in the air.

In the meantime, Count Henry had suffered difficulties, which he ascribed to his dismissal of Notburga, so he rehired her and the estate prospered. Shortly before her death she is said to have told her master to place her corpse on a wagon drawn by two oxen and to bury her wherever the oxen stood still. The oxen drew the wagon to the chapel of St. Rupert near Eben, where she was buried.

== Veneration ==
On 27 March 1862, Pope Pius IX canonized Notburga as a saint. Her feast is celebrated on 13 September or on 14 September. She is usually represented with an ear of corn, or flowers and a sickle in her hand; sometimes the sickle is suspended in the air.

== Gallery ==
Venerated skeletonrelic of Saint Notburga, located in the altar of the Parish Church of Eben am Achensee.

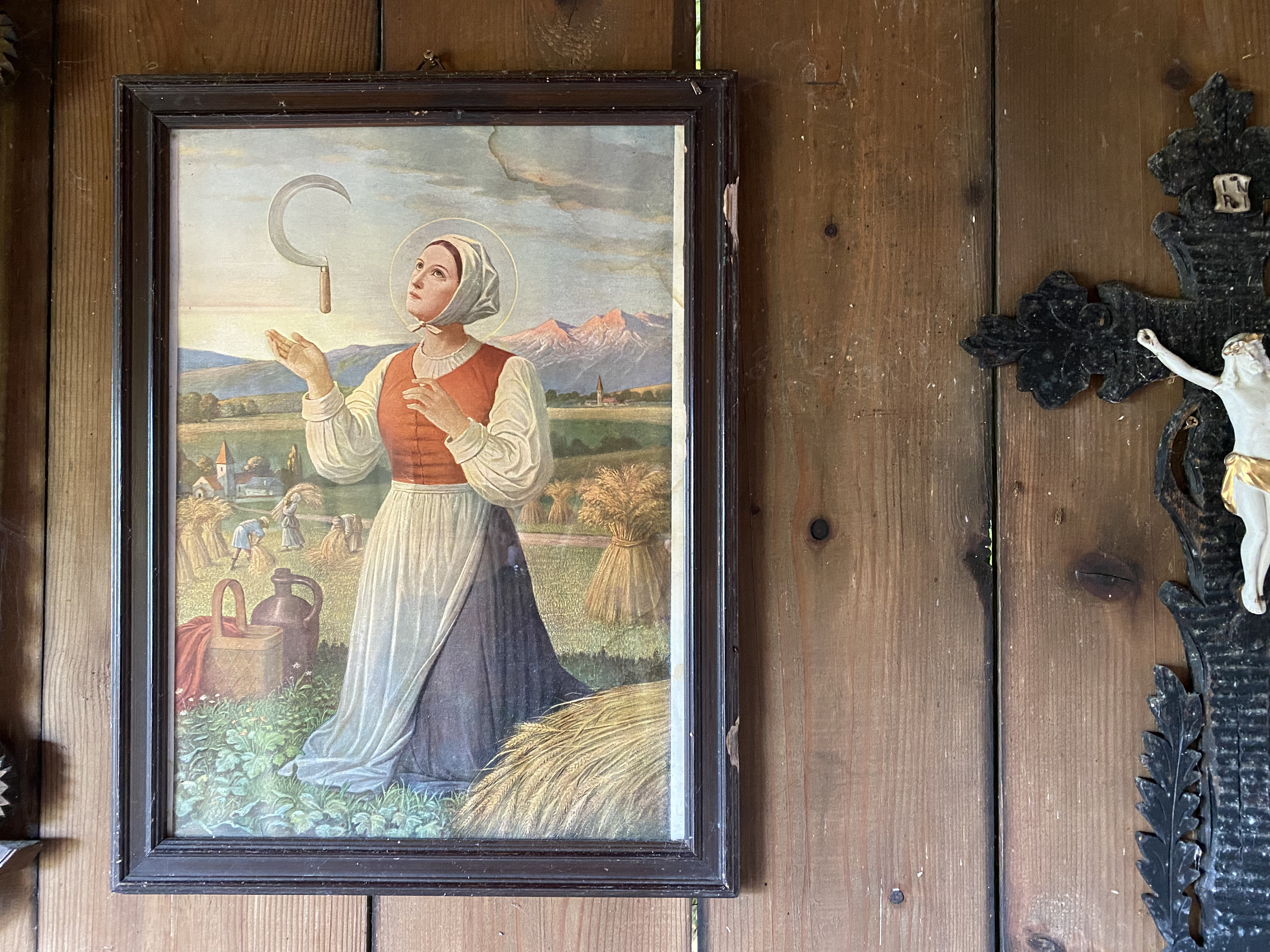
Saint Notburga next to a crucifix, Bad Birnbach, Bavaria

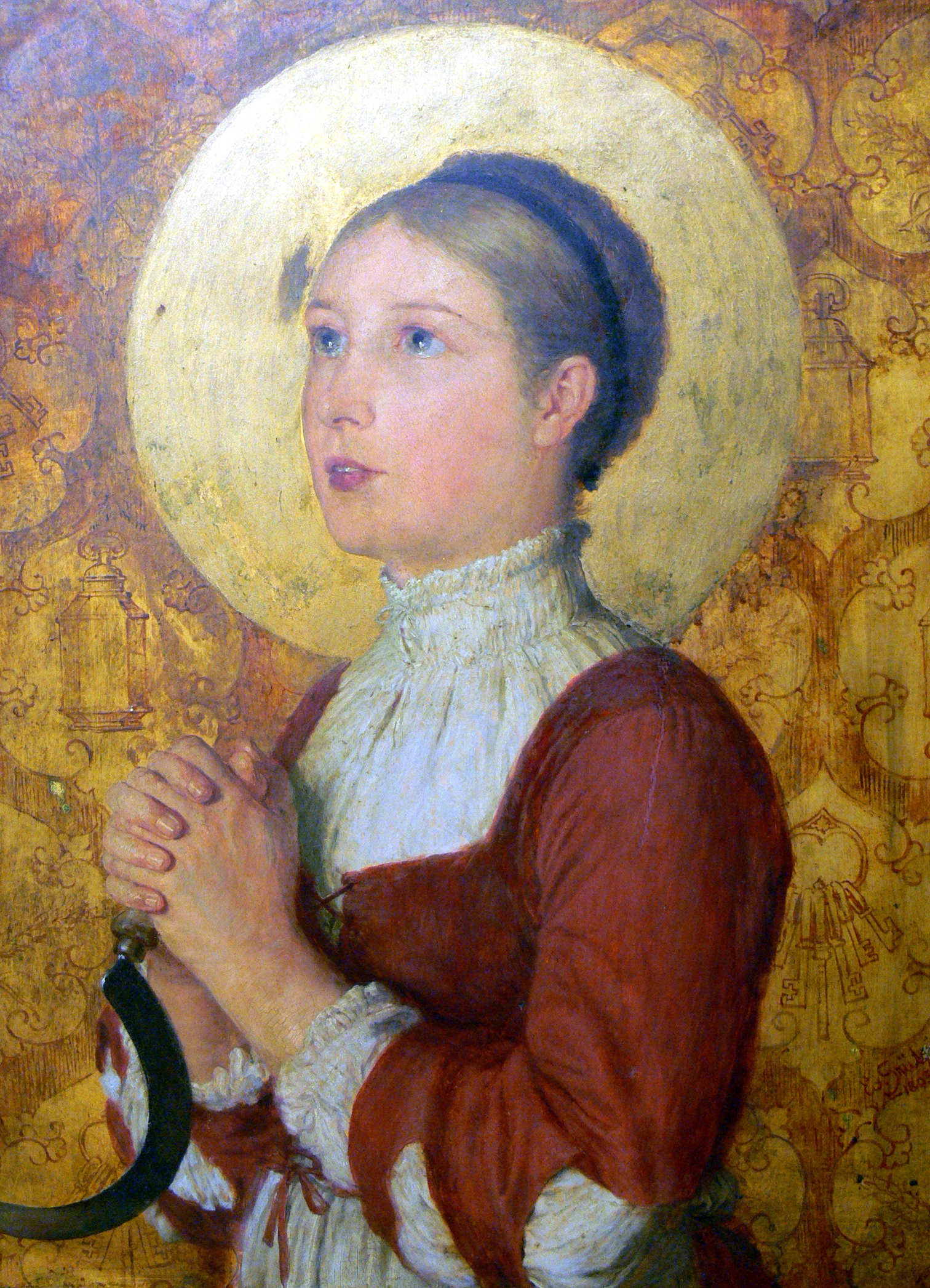
Saint Notburga by Eduard von Grützner, in the collection of the Augustinian Museum, Rattenberg Augustinian Museum, Rattenberg

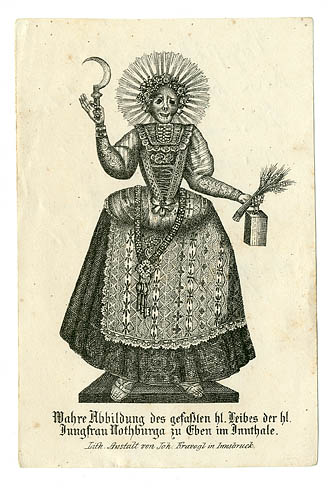
Lithograph by Johann Nepomuk Kravogl depicting the skeleton relic of Saint Notburga

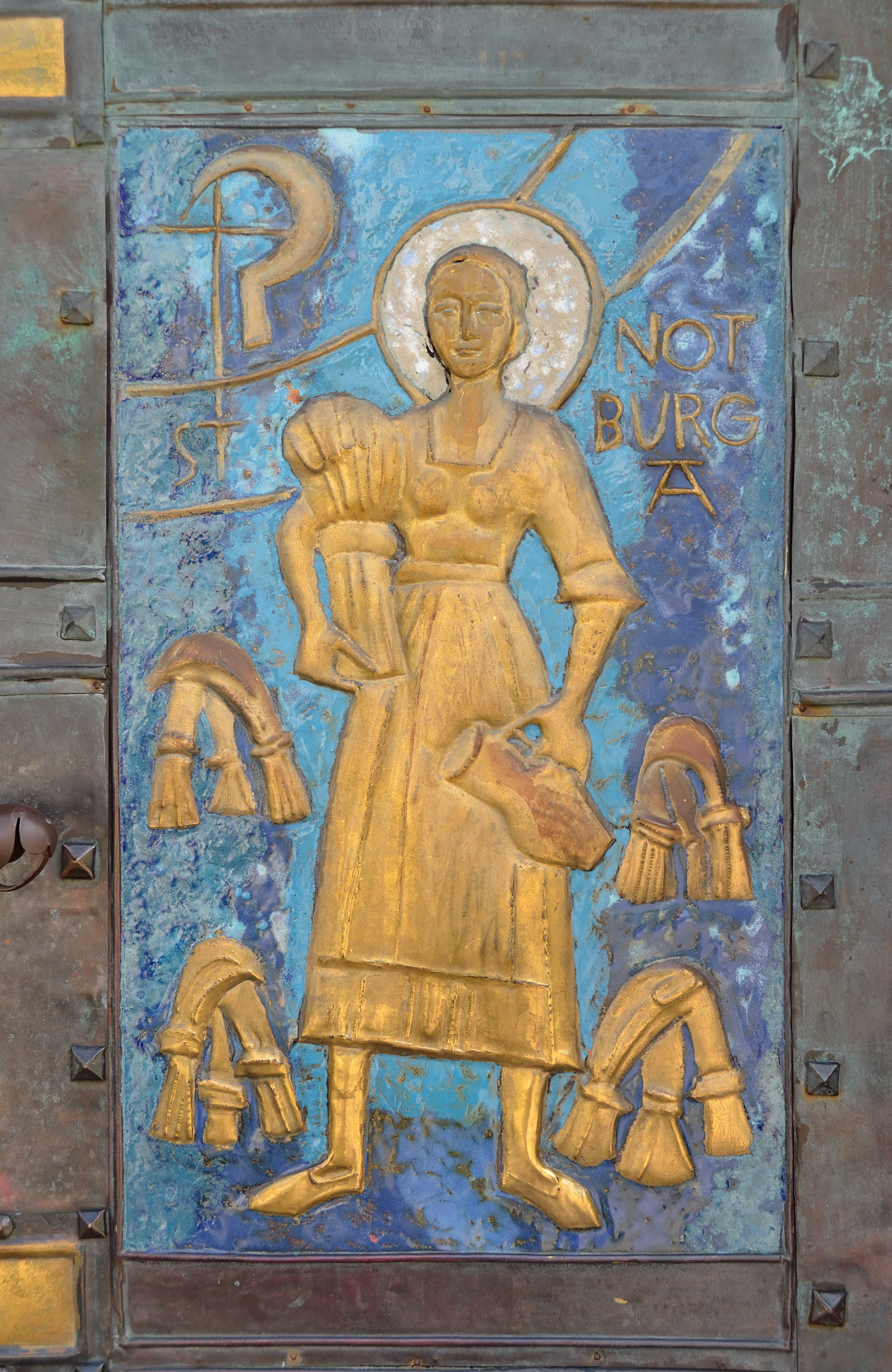
Bas relief of Saint Notburga from the portal of the Church of St. Margaretha in Wenigzell, Styria

Tableau of statues of Saint Apollonia, the Virgin Mary and Saint Notburga at St. Joseph's Church, Frankolovo, Slovenia

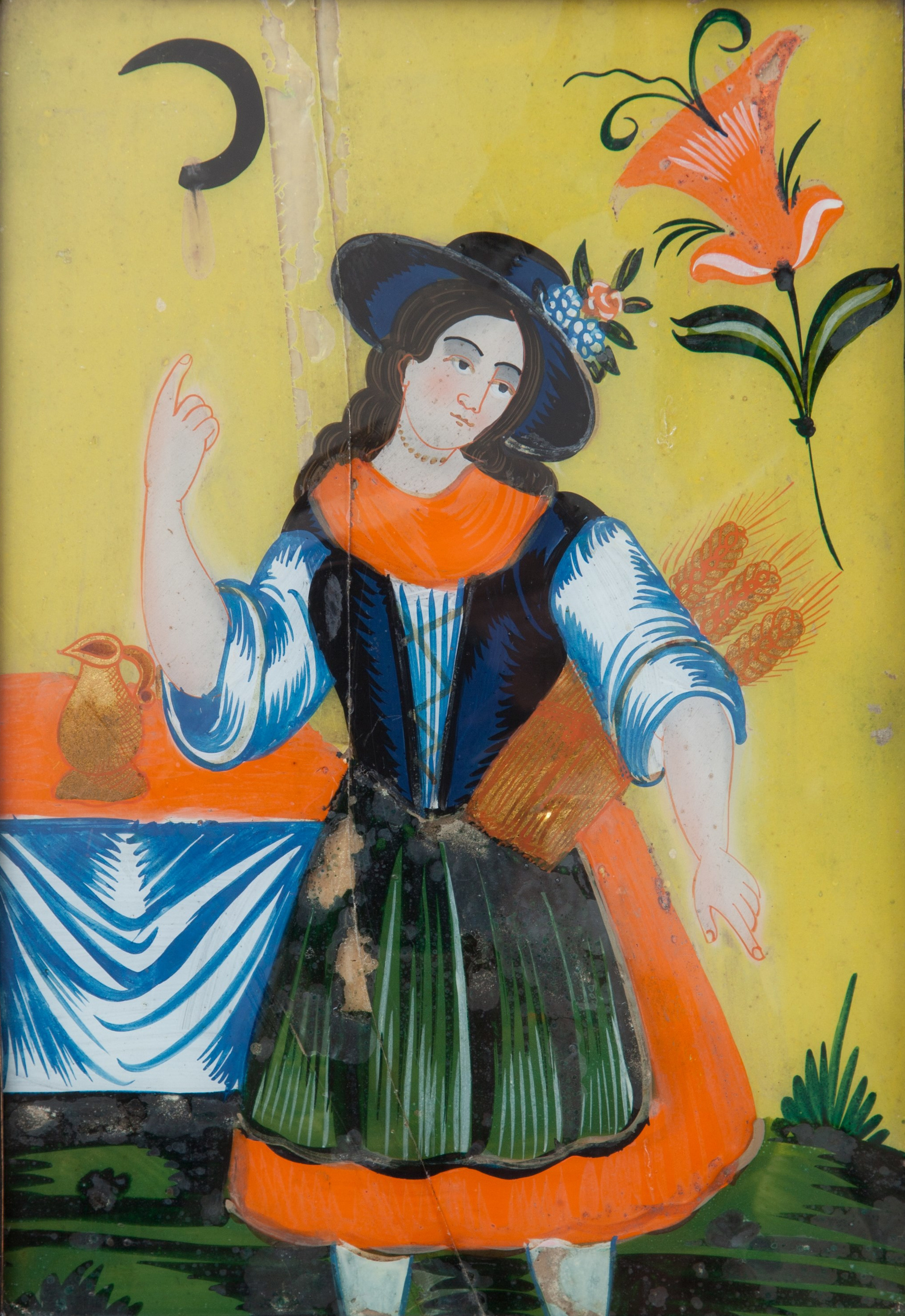
Glass painting of Saint Notburga from the Ptuj Ormož Regional Museum, Slovenia

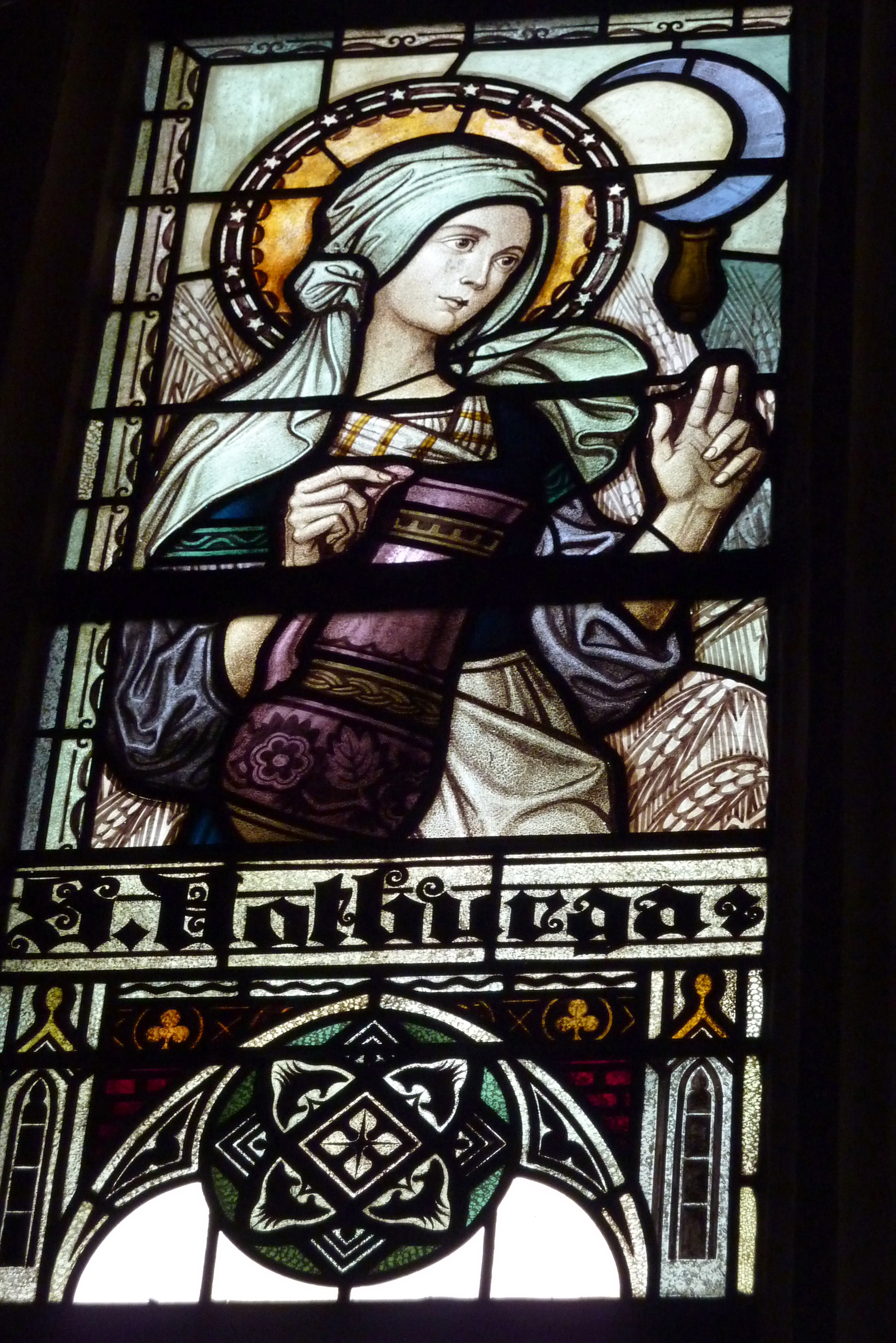
Stained glass in Church of Our Lady of Sorrows, Biesfeld

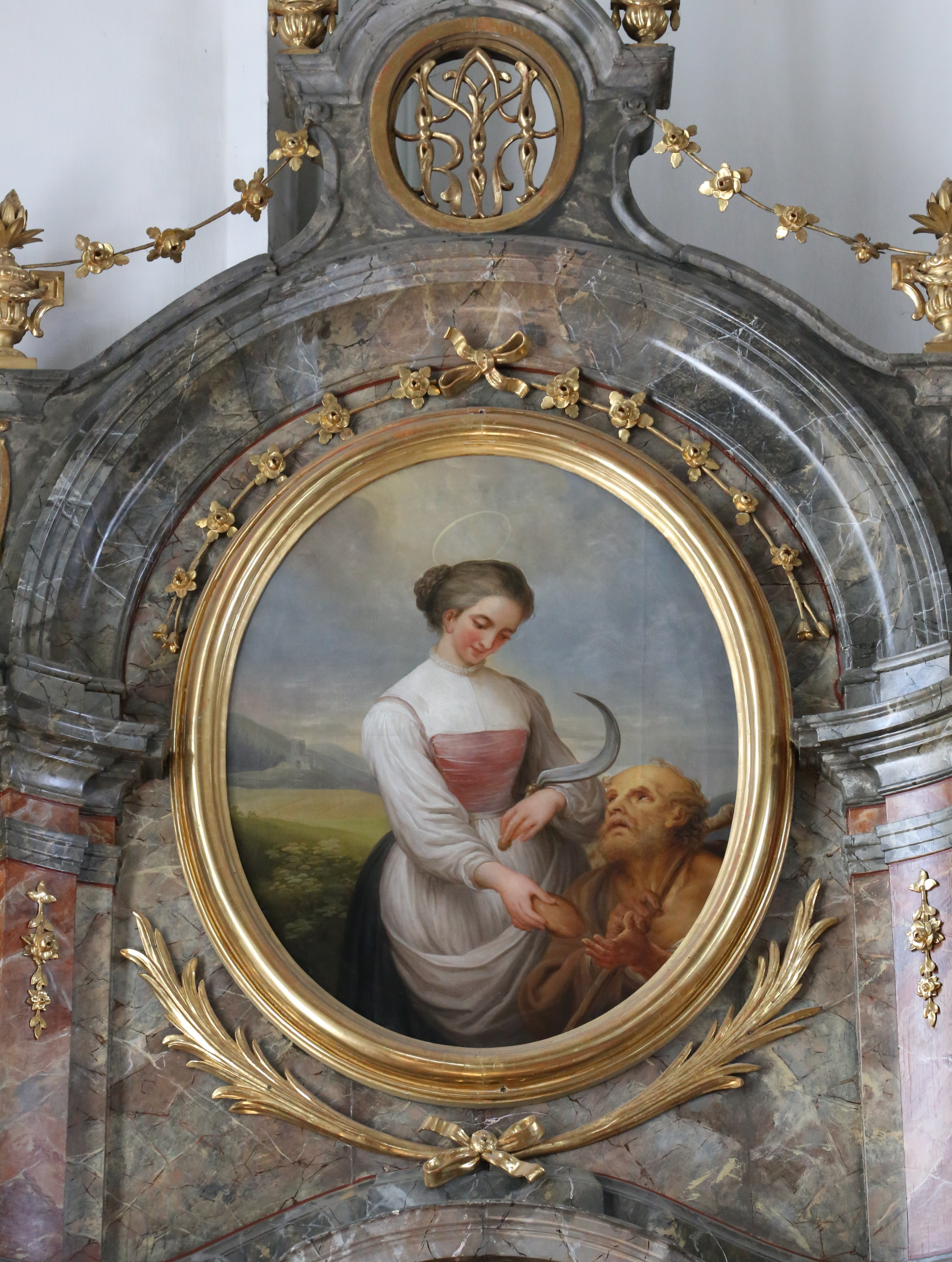
Painting of Saint Notburga from St. Peter's Church, Alpbachtal
