= Achen Lake =

Lake in Tyrol, Austria

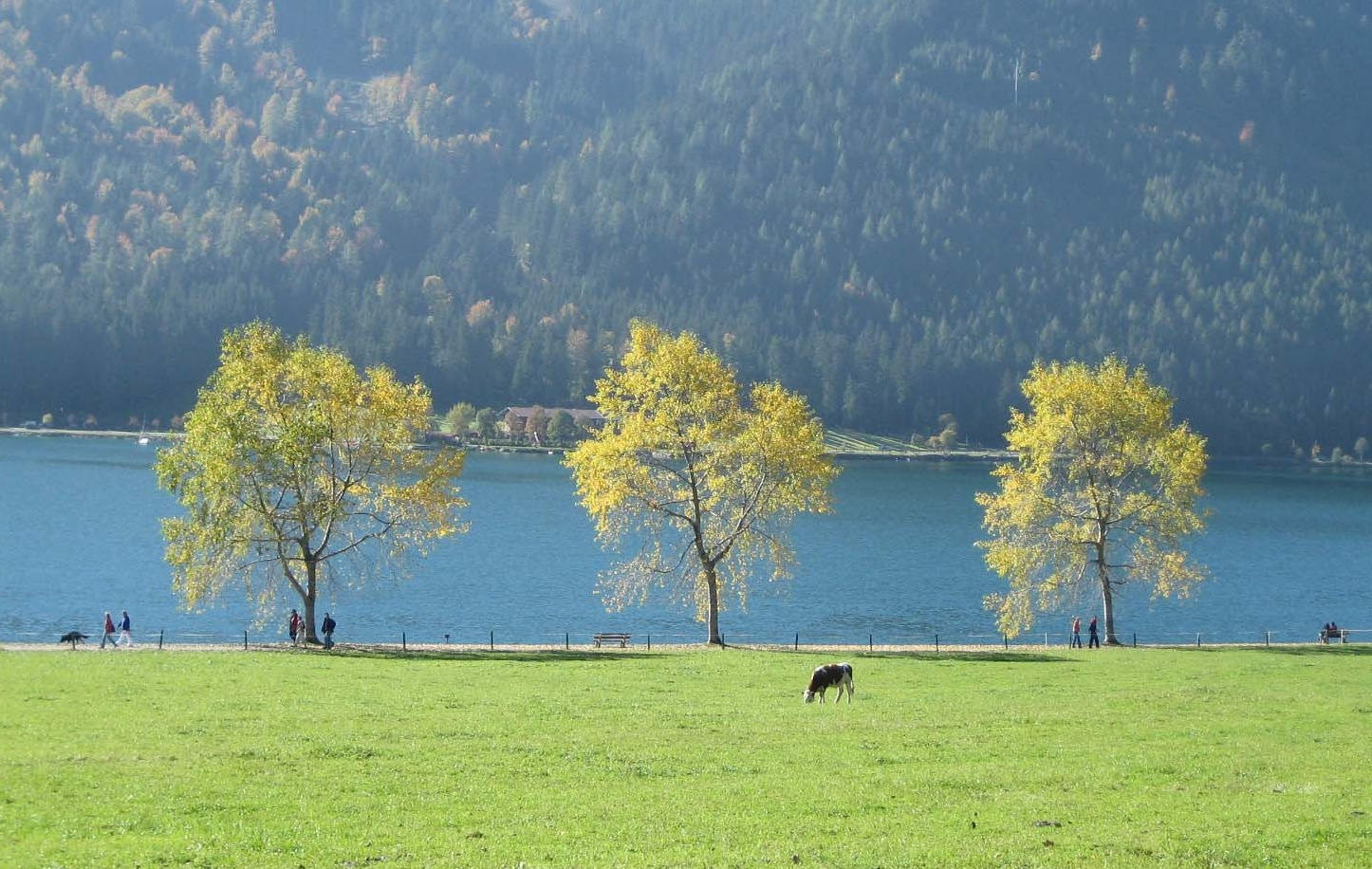
- in autumn

- Location within Austria
- Location: Tyrol
- Coordinates: 47°26′N 11°43′E
- Primary inflows: Buchauer Bach, Dalfazer Bach, Wankratz Bach
- Primary outflows: Achen Bach
- Basin countries: Austria
- Max. length: 9.4 km (5.8 mi)
- Max. width: 1 km (0.62 mi)
- Surface area: 6.8 km^{2} (2.6 sq mi)
- Max. depth: 133 m (436 ft)
- Water volume: 0.481 km^{3} (0.115 cu mi)
- Surface elevation: 929 m (3,048 ft)

Lake Achen (German: Achensee) is a lake in Austria, north of Jenbach in Tyrol. Lake Achen is also called "Fjord of the Alps" and "Tyrolean Sea". The largest lake within the federal state, its maximum depth is 133 metres (436 ft). Together with the Achen Valley, it parts the Karwendel mountain range in the west from the Brandenberg Alps in the east.

Water quality is near that of drinking water, with sight up to ten metres (33 ft) below the surface. An alpine lake, water temperature is accordingly low, rarely above 20 °C (68 °F). Its size and wind conditions make it suitable for windsurfing.

Eben am Achensee, Achenkirch, and Pertisau are municipalities on the lake.

== History ==
The city of Innsbruck bought the lake in 1919 from the St. Georgenberg-Fiecht Abbey, who had received it from the rulers of Schlitters around 1120.

Due to various texts and illustrations in the hunting and fishing manuscripts of Emperor Maximilian, Lake Achensee was famous already at the beginning of the 15th century.

== Powerplant ==
Since 1924, the lake is managed by the Tiroler Wasserkraft AG (TIWAG), which was founded for this purpose.

Originally, its only outflow was the Achenbach, feeding the Isar. Since 1927, when a power plant in Jenbach was finished, it primarily feeds the Inn, at a level difference of 380 m below. Eight pelton wheels at 500 RPM produce a total of 96 MW.

In winter, the level of the lake is lowered by up to 6 meters; accordingly the size of the lake keeps changing. At maximum level, the reservoir can store 66 million m^{3} of water.

== Tourism ==
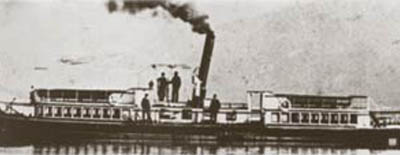
St. Joseph (1887)

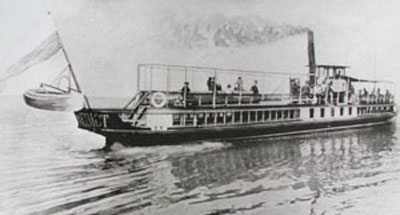
St. Benedikt, about 1900

When the Lower Inn Valley Railway (Unterinntalbahn) railway was finished in 1859, tourism started to flourish. In order to make the abbey profit, the first steamboat St. Josef was acquired in 1887. Furthermore, the construction of the 7 km long Achenseebahn narrow gauge rack railway was initiated, which went into service in 1889 between Jenbach and Seespitz. On 21 July that year a second steamboat, the St. Benedikt, went into service. In 1890 the two boats with a capacity of 320 seats transported about 30,000 persons.

In 1911 a third scheduled boat, the Stella Maris went into service. It was the first passenger boat on a lake in the Danubian monarchy originally equipped with a diesel engine. The boat was designed for 400 passengers, and featured a particularly silent engine at low rpm, similar to those that later were used in the submarines of World War I.

However, the Stella Maris was difficult to manoeuvre. When the lake was bought by the city of Innsbruck in 1919, the boat was renamed into Stadt Innsbruck. In 1925 a motorboat named Tirol was acquired, and in 1927 for the first time more than 100,000 persons were transported.

In 1959 the St. Benedikt was replaced with a modern ship of the same name with a diesel engine. In 1971 the Tirol was replaced with a larger Tirol II for 40 passengers. In 1994 the MS Tirol went into service, replacing the Stadt Innsbruck, and in August 2007 the MS Stadt Innsbruck replaced the St. Benedikt.

== Recreation ==
Achen Lake is a large tourist destination year round.

In the summer, Achen Lake is used for various watersports, swimming, and boating. The land surrounding the lake has a lot to offer guests with over 500 kilometers of marked hiking trails, 250 kilometers of (e-)bike routes, 183 kilometers of signposted running trails, numerous climbing and via ferrata routes, and two golf courses.

In the winter, the area around Achen Lake continues to draw tourists as a cross-country skiing hub. The region's ski areas have 53 km of family-friendly slopes and bespoke offers for children, as well as over 220 kilometres of trails groomed for classic skiing and numerous tracks for adaptive skiing.

== The Chalet School series ==
The Achensee and its hinterland are the setting for the first thirteen of the Chalet School series of books by Elinor Brent-Dyer, and part of the fourteenth, The Chalet School in Exile (1940); specifically, Pertisau. Brent-Dyer had visited the Tyrol in the 1920s. Nancy G. Rosoff and Stephanie Spencer have written that Brent-Dyer "used the setting of her fictional school in the Austrian Tyrol to give her readers some hard lessons about Nazi persecution".

== Gallery ==
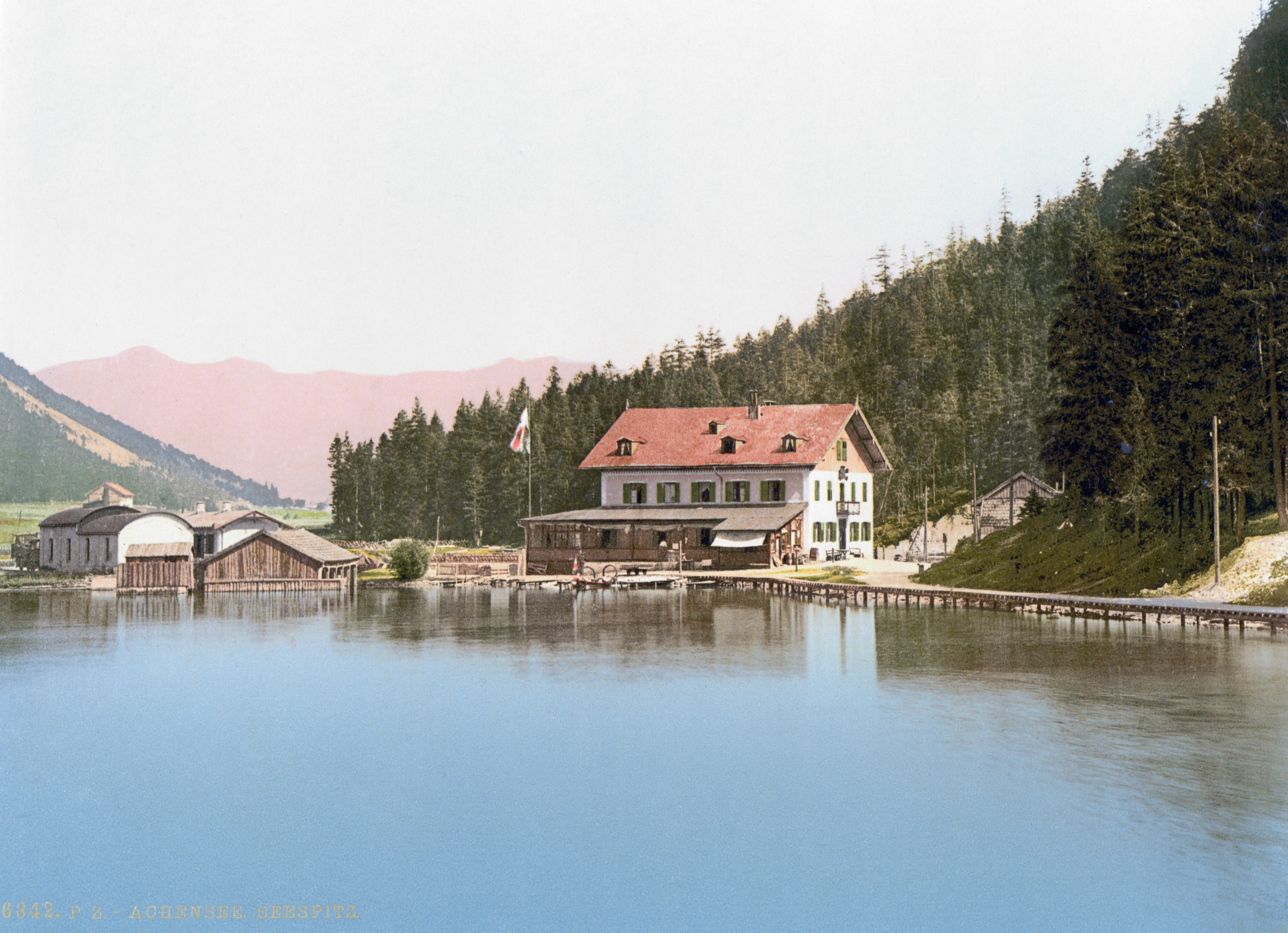
Seespitz about 1900

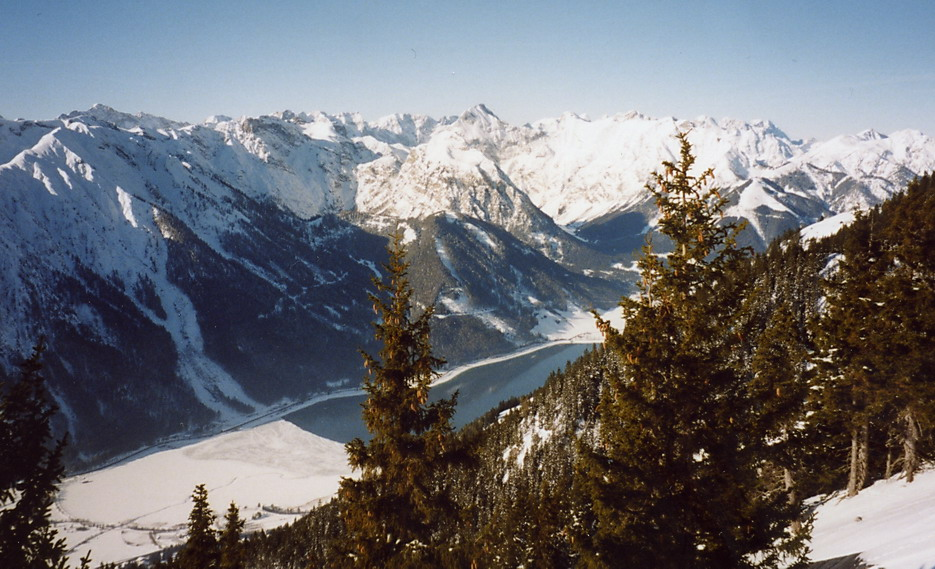
Achensee in winter

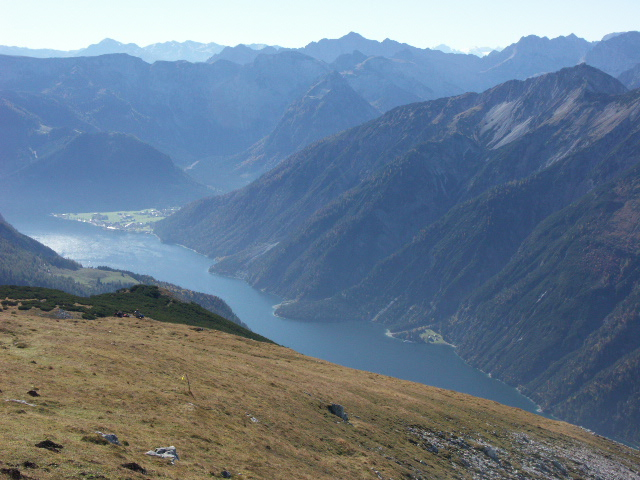
View from mountain top of Big Unnütz towards Pertisau (SW)

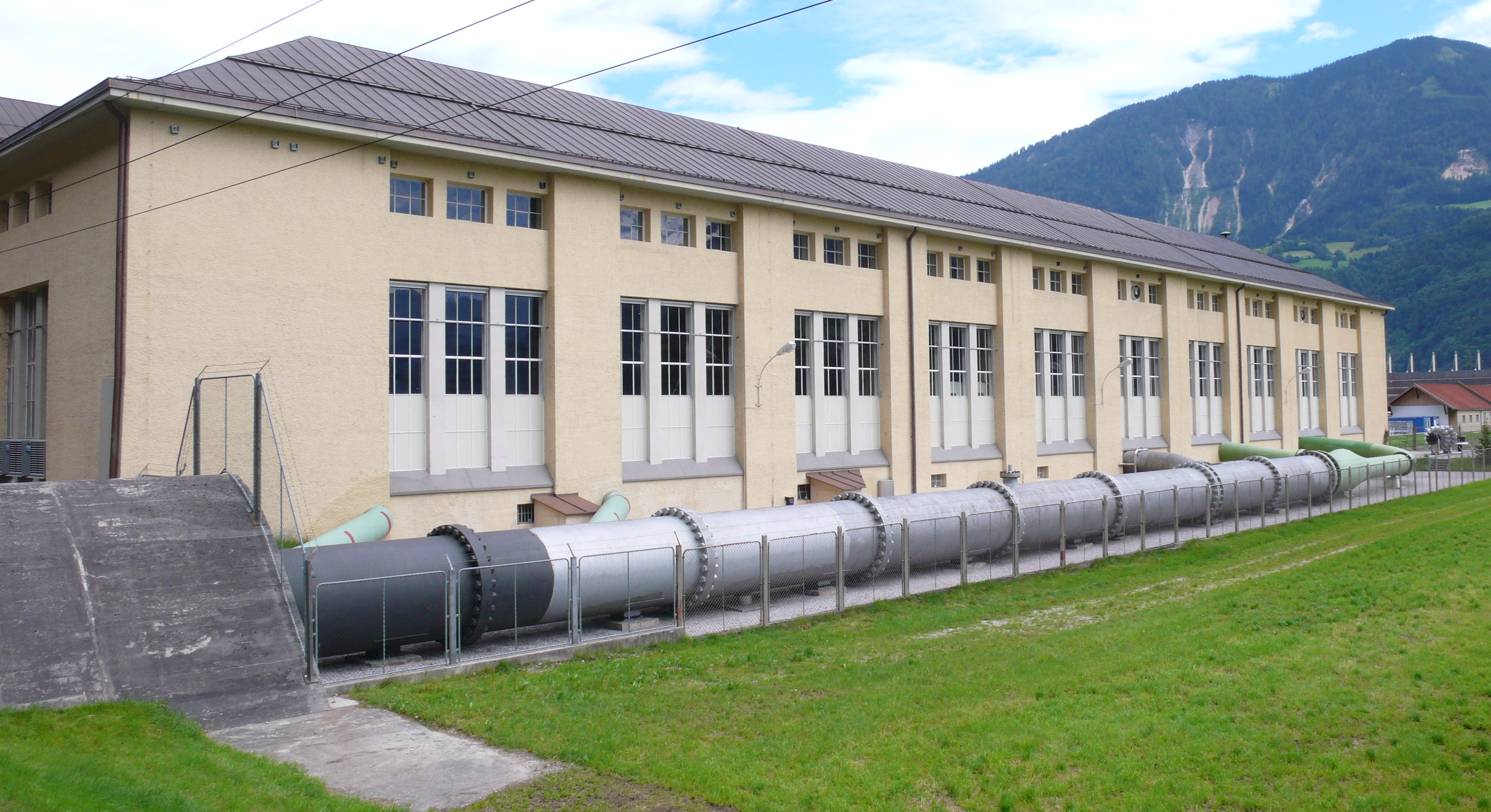
Achenseekraftwerk in Inntal valley

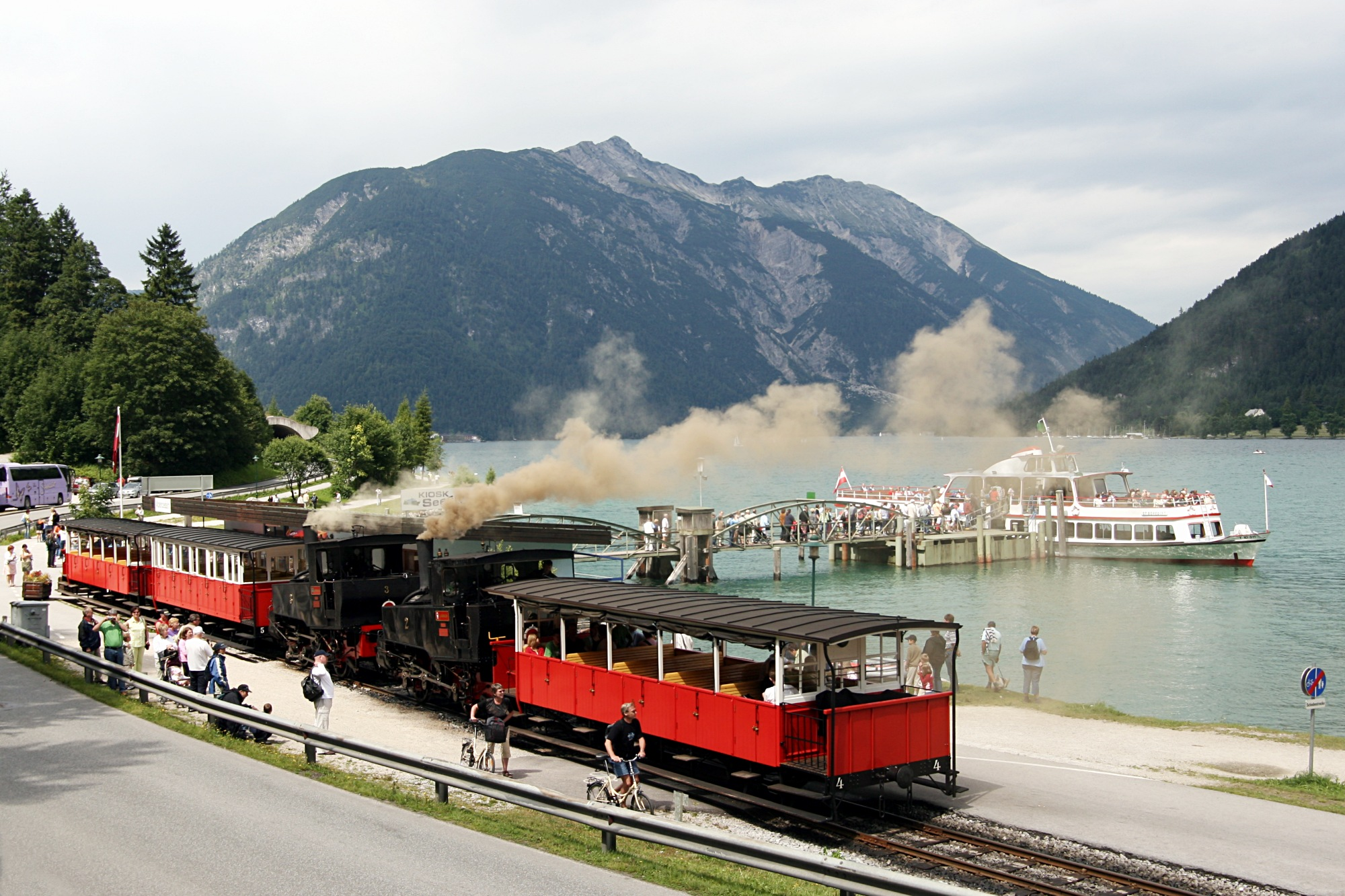
Achenseebahn with steam boat St. Benedikt (II)

== Literature ==
- Naupp, Thomas OSB und Pinggera, Dr. Gert-Klaus: Stiftsmuseum Fiecht, Dokumente zur Geschichte von St. Georgenberg-Fiecht (Katalog)
- Armbruster, Karl; Pawlik, Hans Peter: Jenbach – Achensee. Die Tiroler Zahnradbahn. Slezak Verlag, Wien 1993; 96 S. ISBN 3-85416-149-2
