= Achensee railway line =

Austrian cog railway line

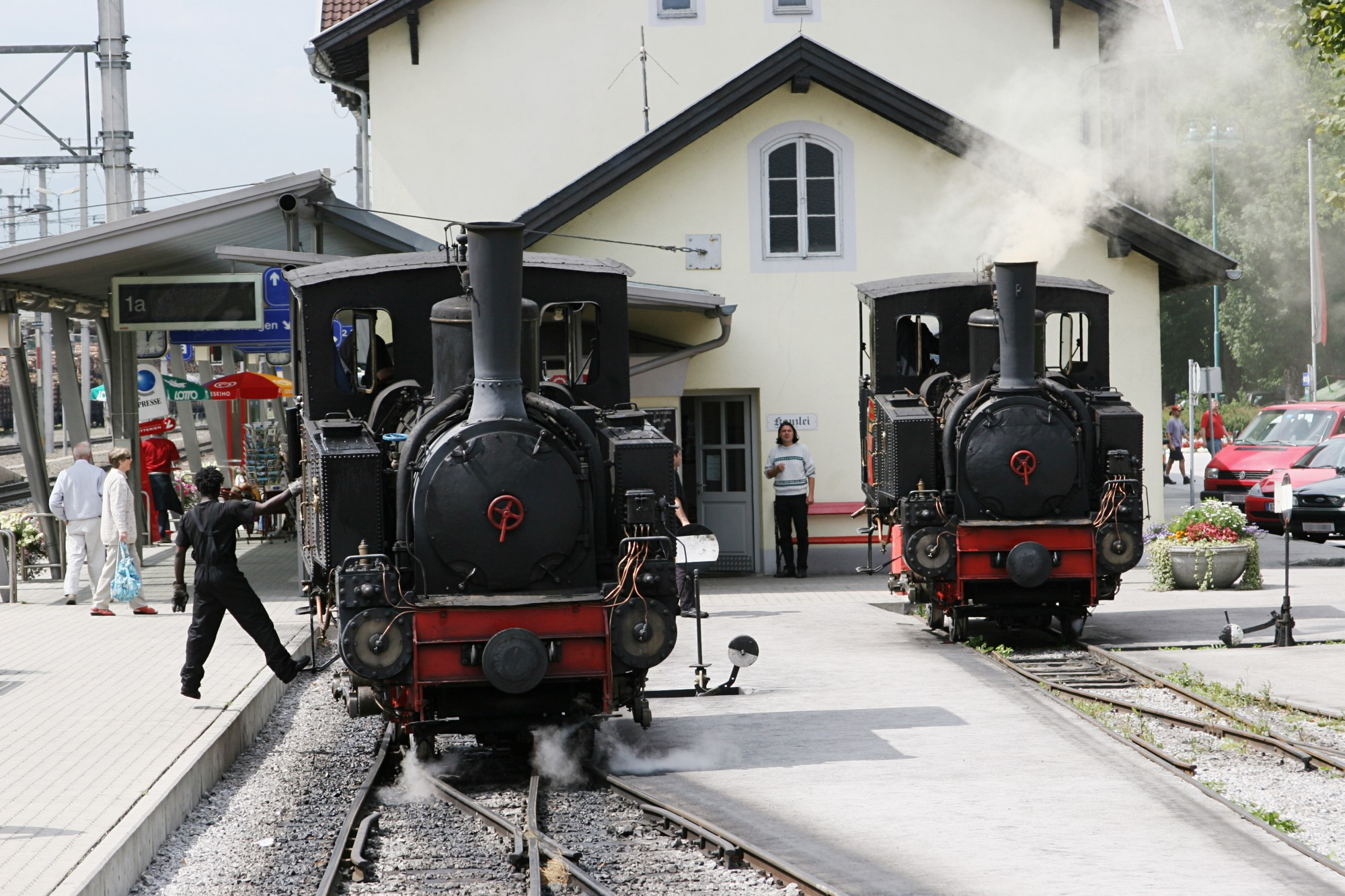
- Two locomotives at Jenbach station

Overview
- Native name: Achenseebahn

Technical
- Line length: 6.78 km (4.21 mi)
- Rack system: Riggenbach
- Track gauge: 1,000 mm (3 ft 3 3/8 in)
- Minimum radius: 134 m (440 ft)
- Maximum incline: Adhesion 2.5 % Rack rail 16 %

The Achensee railway line (German: Achenseebahn, pronounced [ˈaːxn̩zeːˌbaːn]]) is a 6.78-kilometre (4.21 mi) long metre gauge railway running between Jenbach (47.3886°N 11.7781°E) and Seespitz (47.4258°N 11.7298°E) on Lake Achen in Tyrol (Austria). Within its length it rises some 440 metres (1,444 ft) in height, with the steeper sections using the Riggenbach rack system. It is Europe's oldest cog railway which is still steam operated.

== History ==
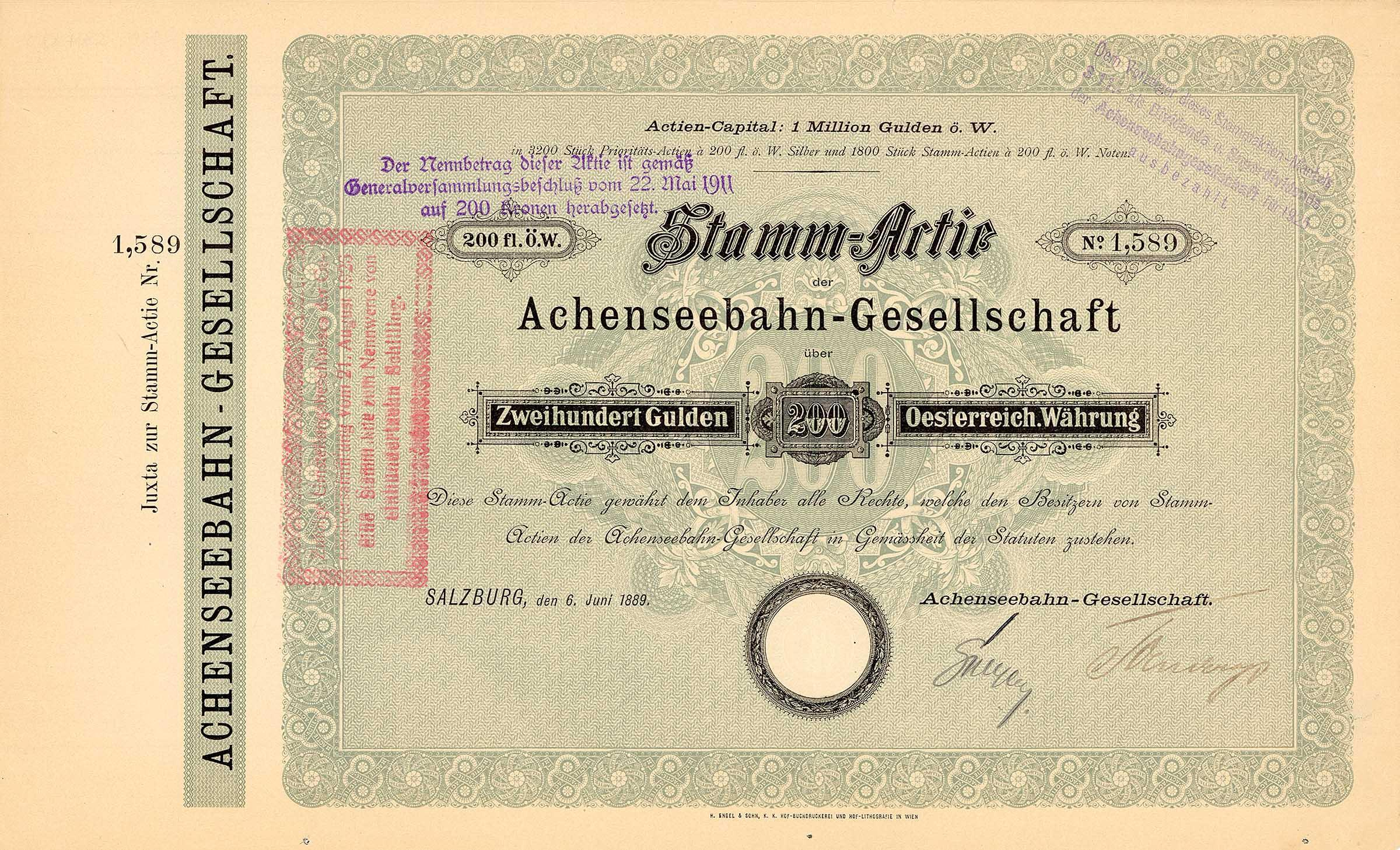
Founder's share of the Achensee Railway, issued 6 June 1889

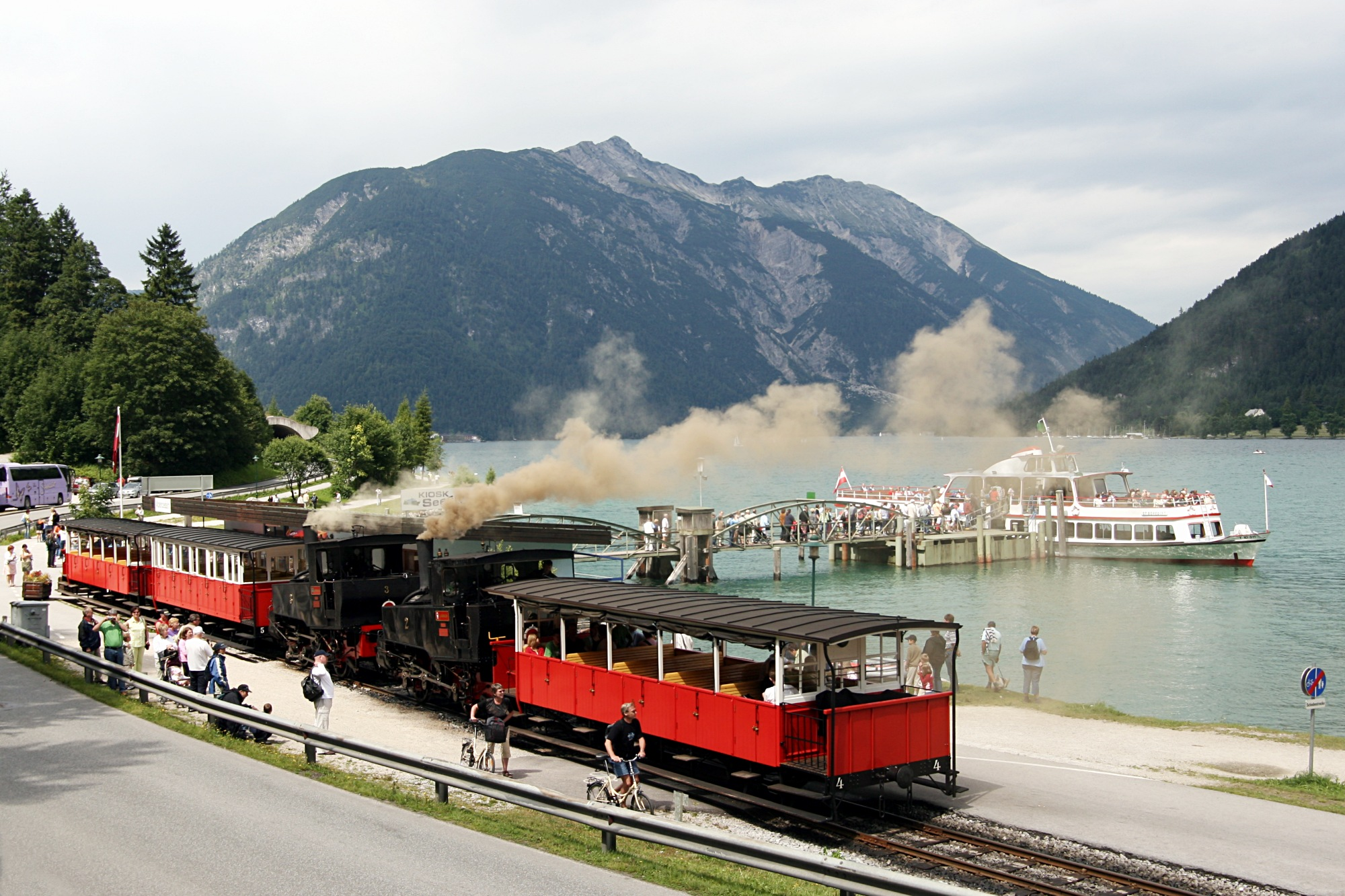
Station at Seespitz am Achensee

In 1886, Theodor Friedrich Freiherr von Dreifuss proposed to connect Jenbach to the Achensee. Despite concerns by villagers in the area, the proposal was supported by the monastery at Fiecht, which owned the Achensee and ran steam boats on the lake.

Consent to build the line was given on 1 August 1888 by Emperor Franz Josef. The line was constructed by the Soenderop Company of Berlin. The official opening of the line was on 8 June 1889. The line originally ended a short distance short of the pier for the steamboats as it was intended to run a luggage service between Seespitz station and the pier at an extra charge. The railway was extended to a new station serving the steamboats in 1916.

The railway carried its highest numbers of passengers during World War II and after the war the railway was an important method of supplying the region with goods and materials. In 1950, the Tirolean Water Company (TIWAG) acquired a majority of the shares in the railway, passing them to the villages of Achenkirch, Maurach and Eben in 1979. Carriage of freight ceased in 1973. The railway was remodelled with support from TIWAG, the Federal Government and State Government.

On 16 May 2008, the engine shed at Jenbach railway station was destroyed in a fire. Locomotive No. 1 was damaged, but will be restored, as will the engine shed. In 2009, the shed has been completed and the No. 1 was rebuilt.

The operating company planned in the late 2010s to convert the line from a tourist attraction into a commuter railway, by electrifying it and extending it to Pertisau from the current terminus at Seespitz. However, plans to replace steam traction and extend the line have been indefinitely shelved since the bankruptcy of the original operator.

On 25 March 2020, the company became insolvent following the refusal of further funding by the Tyrol regional government.

From 2022, the Achenseebahn Infrastruktur- und Betriebs- GmbH, founded on 2 March 2021 as the successor company, is to be in charge of operations. In May 2021 the new operating company was granted the licence. Management and operations management is taken over by the Zillertalbahn. Operations resumed in April 2022.

== Rolling stock ==
=== Steam locomotives ===
All steam locomotives are 0-4-0RT engines.

Number and name (original name)	Builder	Works number/year	Notes	Photo
1 Eben am Achensee (Theodor)	Wiener Lokomotivfabrik, Floridsdorf	701/1889	Damaged in 2008 fire. On display in Achenseer Museumswelt since 2009.	
2 Jenbach (Hermann)	Wiener Lokomotivfabrik, Floridsdorf	702/1889	In service.	
3 Achenkirch (Georg)	Wiener Lokomotivfabrik, Floridsdorf	703/1889	In service.	
4 (Carl)	Wiener Lokomotivfabrik, Floridsdorf	704/1889	Withdrawn 1930, dismantled 1955 for spares.	
4 Eben am Achensee (Hannah)	Wiener Lokomotivfabrik, Floridsdorf	704/1889	Built using old frames of No.2, mechanism from No.3 and undamaged parts from No.1 and a second-hand boiler from Poland. In service since 2008.	

=== Passenger stock ===
The Achensee Railway has four open and two closed four-wheeled coaches. The open coaches were built in Graz in 1889. The closed coaches were built in Esslingen in 1903 and 1907.

In 2018, five rack-fitted Electric Multiple Unit carriages were purchased from the Appenzell Railways, Switzerland, but did not enter service.

=== Freight stock ===
The Achenseebahn had four lowside open wagons, one highside open wagon and one van on opening. Three more lowsides were acquired new in 1926. These three vehicles were in service until 1973; the others were withdrawn in 1955.

== Infrastructure ==
The 6.78 km (4.21 mi) route has a track gauge of 1,000 mm (3 ft 3 3/8 in). It runs between Jenbach and Achensee Schiffstation. The Riggenbach rack system is installed between Jenbach and Eben, from which point the line descends gently to Achensee Schiffstation. Upwards trains propel to Eben, where the engine runs round and hauls the coaches to the Achensee terminal. The engine leads throughout on the downward journey.
