= Tyrolean Oberland =

Part of the Austrian state of Tyrol west of Innsbruck

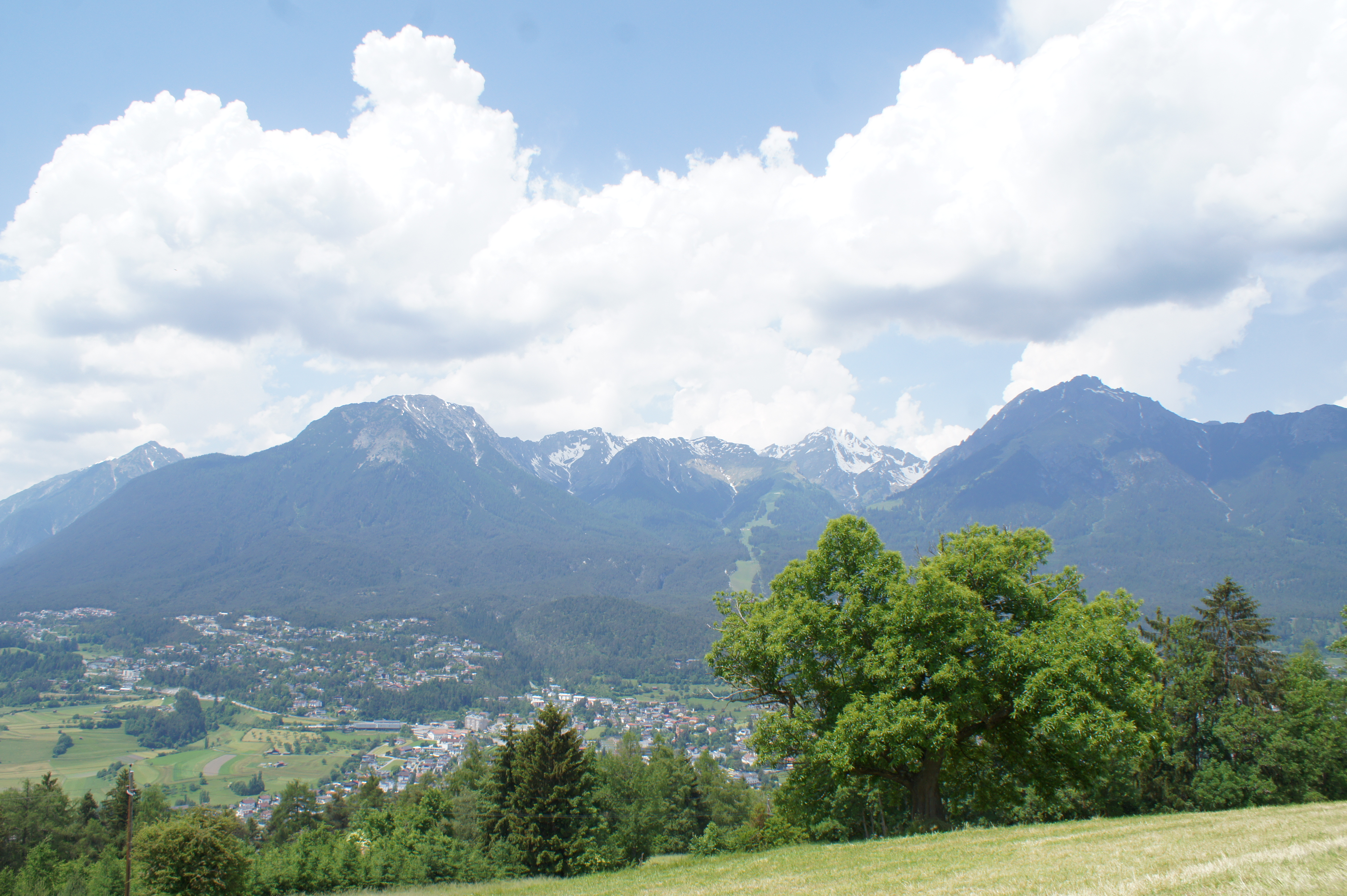
Tyrolean Oberland near Imst

The Tyrolean Oberland (German: Tiroler Oberland) is that part of the Austrian state of Tyrol west of Innsbruck or, more precisely, west of the Melach river, but excluding the Außerfern region.

== Language and extent ==
The most common dialect in the Tyrolean Oberland is Southern Austro-Bavarian, an Alemannian accent becoming increasingly noticeable the further west of Imst one goes. The dialect in the Walser village of Galtür and in St. Anton am Arlberg can be considered part of the Alemannic dialect continuum.

In many cases the region of Außerfern is also counted as part of the Oberland, although it is very isolated from the Tyrolean Oberland. The reasons for this are mainly administrative in nature, because the Außerfern has a very low population. In addition, several dialects in the Außerfern are very similar to the Oberland dialects and cause confusion even within Tyrol itself.

== NUTS classification: AT334 ==
In the NUTS classification by the European Union for official statistics the Tirolean Oberland is one of the five groups of districts (level NUTS:AT 2) in Tyrol; it has the code AT334 and covers the two political districts of:

- Imst District
- Landeck District

The district of Innsbruck Land, which traditionally counts as part of Oberland and Unterland, falls within AT332 Innsbruck group of districts.

- Towns: Imst, Landeck
- Largest village: Telfs

== See also ==
- Tyrolean Unterland
