= ISO 3166-2:AT =

Entry for Austria in ISO 3166-2

ISO 3166-2:AT is the entry for Austria in ISO 3166-2, part of the ISO 3166 standard published by the International Organization for Standardization (ISO), which defines codes for the names of the principal subdivisions (e.g., provinces or states) of all countries coded in ISO 3166-1.

Currently for Austria, ISO 3166-2 codes are defined for nine states.

Each code consists of two parts, separated by a hyphen. The first part is AT, the ISO 3166-1 alpha-2 code of Austria. The second part is a digit (1–9).

== Current codes ==
Subdivision names are listed as in the ISO 3166-2 standard published by the ISO 3166 Maintenance Agency (ISO 3166/MA).

Click on the button in the header to sort each column.

Map of Austria with each state labelled with the second part of its ISO 3166-2 code.

Code	Subdivision name (de)	Subdivision name (en) (Note: For reference only; English name not included in the ISO 3166-2 standard.)
AT-1	Burgenland	Burgenland
AT-2	Kärnten	Carinthia
AT-3	Niederösterreich	Lower Austria
AT-4	Oberösterreich	Upper Austria
AT-5	Salzburg	Salzburg
AT-6	Steiermark	Styria
AT-7	Tirol	Tyrol
AT-8	Vorarlberg	Vorarlberg
AT-9	Wien	Vienna

== Changes ==
The following changes to the entry are listed on ISO's online catalogue, the Online Browsing Platform:

Effective date of change	Short description of change (en)
2014-11-03	Update List Source
2015-11-27	Change of subdivision category from federal Länder to state; update List Source

== See also ==
- Subdivisions of Austria
- FIPS region codes of Austria
- NUTS codes of Austria
- Neighbouring countries: CH, CZ, DE, HU, IT, LI, SI, SK
