= Landesregierung =

Landesregierung refers to local governments in German-speaking countries:

- State government (Austria)
- State government (Germany)
- Provincial government (South Tyrol)
