= Tyrolean Unterland =

Region of the Austrian state of Tyrol

Coordinates: 47°20′N 12°00′E

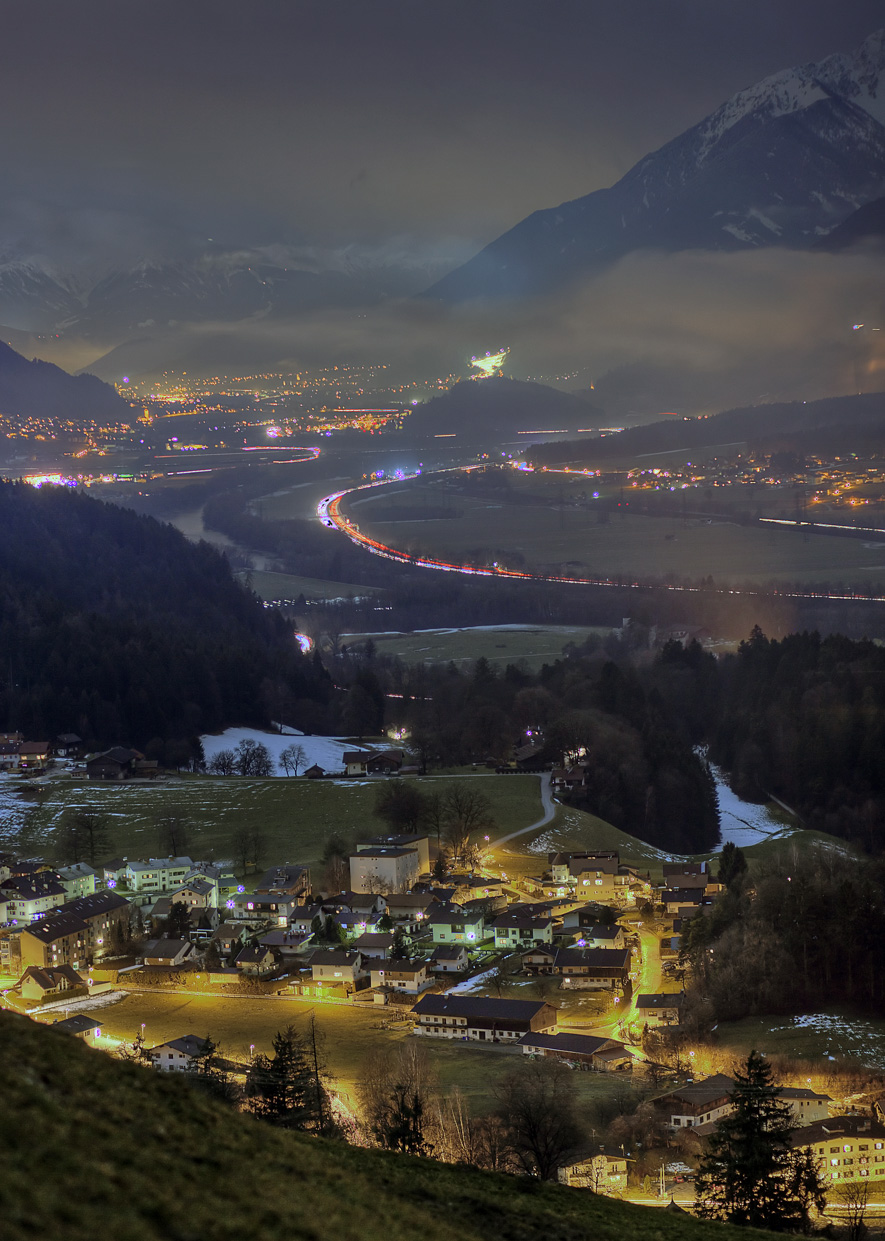
View of the Inn Valley

The Tyrolean Unterland (German: Tiroler Unterland) is that part of the Austrian state of Tyrol east of its capital city, Innsbruck, excluding East Tyrol.

== Extent and language ==
The Tyrolean Unterland should not be confused with the Tyrolean Lower Inn Valley (Tiroler Unterinntal) which is in the same region but only describes the Inn valley, nor with the South Tyrolean Unterland (Südtiroler Unterland).

Besides the Unterland there is also the Tyrolean Oberland, which lies west of Innsbruck. Innsbruck itself is usually considered to be part of the Lower Inn valley, but is usually mentioned separately. The middle Inn valley around Innsbruck is therefore often referred to as the Tyrolean Mittelland (Tiroler Mittelland).

A further distinction can be made based on linguistic criteria. The linguistic shade using the "sch" sound - e.g. Tirol isch lei oans - is exhibited especially in dialects west of the Zillertal. On that basis, the Tyrolese living actually in the Lower Inn valley are not strictly in the Tyrolean Unterland, because the differ from them through this South Austro-Bavarian "sch" from the Bavarian dialects that are found east of the Zillertal. In the districts of Kufstein and Kitzbühel a Central Austro-Bavarian dialect tends to prevail over the South Austro-Bavarian version.

For example a person from Schwaz naturally feels himself to be a Tyrolese, more precisely an Unterinntaler from the Lower Inn valley – but in no circumstances considers himself to be an Unterlandler. If a native from Schwaz drives to Kufstein, he is from his point of view "in the Unterland", whilst he himself lives between Innsbruck and the Unterland, but not actually in the Unterland, although according to the geographical definition that is self-evidently the case.

== NUTS classification: AT335 ==
In the NUTS classification by the European Union for official statistics the Tirolean Oberland is one of the five groups of districts (level NUTS:AT 2) in Tyrol; it has the code AT335 and covers the three political districts of:

- Schwaz District
- Kufstein District
- Kitzbühel District

The district of Innsbruck Land, which traditionally counts as part of Oberland and Unterland, falls within AT332 Innsbruck group of districts.

Towns in the Tyrolean Unterland: Hall in Tirol, Schwaz, Rattenberg, Wörgl, Kufstein, Kitzbühel
