= State government (Austria) =

A Landesregierung (state government) is a collegial body that exercises executive power in a respective state (Land) of the Republic of Austria.

== Basics ==
The state government is elected by the state parliament and consists of the Governor (Landeshauptmann), their deputy or deputies, and the state councilors (Landesräte). The number of state councilors is determined by the respective state constitution. In Vienna, the City Senate also functions as the state government. In Vorarlberg, the deputy to the Governor bears the title of Landesstatthalter.

Incompatible with holding office as a member of the state government are, in particular, the offices of Federal President, President or vice-president of the Court of Auditors (Rechnungshof), President, vice-president or member of the Supreme Court, the Constitutional Court, and the Supreme Administrative Court.

== Form of government ==
A state government can either be a Proporz government (all parties represented in the Landtag provide State Councillors according to their mandate strength, although in practice often only the larger parties are considered) or a majority or minority government. The choice is determined by the respective state constitution. Government formation via Proporz currently exists only in the states of Lower Austria, Upper Austria and Vienna. Vorarlberg abolished this system as early as 1923. Tyrol and Salzburg followed in 1999. In Burgenland, the Proporz system was abolished in 2014, in Styria in 2015, and in Carinthia in 2017.

Formally, the Proporz principle also applies in Vienna; however, the practice there is that State Councillors (officially designated as City Councillors), who do not belong to the government majority in the Landtag, receive no portfolio and thus become so-called "non-executive City Councillors". Unlike in other states, the abolition of the Proporz system for Vienna would not be possible solely through state law, as Vienna is simultaneously a city and a state, and the Viennese state government therefore also forms the municipal board (City Senate). The Federal Constitution stipulates in Art. 117 Para. 5 B-VG that parties represented in the municipal council have a claim to representation in the municipal board according to their strength. The Proporz system is therefore constitutionally mandatory at the municipal level and thus, in the specific case of Vienna, cannot be abolished for the state level without amending the Federal Constitution.

Cooperation in a Proporz government is not necessarily an indication of unified joint parliamentary work, as is common in a coalition government. For example, in 2000, the Governor of Burgenland Hans Niessl (SPÖ) was elected to his office with the help of the votes of the Green mandataries, who, however, did not provide a State Councillor themselves. In the 1990s, the FPÖ was sufficiently represented in the Burgenland Landtag to send a State Councillor to the state government. However, the SPÖ and ÖVP, who worked together in the Landtag at the time, curtailed the area of responsibility of this government member, who then went down in history as the "Cable Car State Councillor" in the not particularly mountainous Burgenland.

The number of government members varies in the individual states:

- Vienna: 13 members
- Lower Austria: 9 members
- Upper Austria: 9 members
- Styria: 8 members
- Tyrol: 8 members
- Carinthia: 7 members
- Salzburg: 7 members
- Vorarlberg: 7 members
- Burgenland: 5 members

== Office of the State Government ==
The Amt der Landesregierung (Office of the State Government) is the administrative support apparatus of the state government and as such is not an authority in itself. It is led by a Landesamtsdirektor (State Office Director), who, according to Art. 106 of the Federal Constitutional Law (B-VG), must be a legally knowledgeable employee of the Office of the State Government and must be entrusted at least with the management of the internal service.

== Historical overview ==
The development of state governments in Austria has been characterized by a tension between federalist constitutional provisions and a centralized political reality, often described by scholars as a "federation without federalism."

=== First Republic (1918–1933) ===
Following the collapse of the Habsburg monarchy in 1918, a power struggle emerged between the centralist Social Democrats (concentrated in Vienna) and the federalist Christian Socials (dominant in the western Länder). The resulting Federal Constitution of 1920 was a compromise that essentially reinvented the former imperial crown lands as the Länder of the new federation.

Although the constitution included a "residual clause" (Generalklausel, Article 15) which technically granted the states competence in all areas not explicitly assigned to the federal government, the states failed to effectively utilize this provision to expand their power. Instead, the federal government (Bund) gradually expanded its authority into areas of state jurisdiction.

=== Authoritarianism and Nazi Era (1934–1945) ===
The federal system was dismantled during the Austrofascist period (1934–1938) and the subsequent Anschluss (1938), where Austria was incorporated into the Third Reich. The states were reorganized into administrative units (Reichsgaue) directly subject to Berlin, effectively erasing their autonomy.

=== Second Republic (1955–present) ===
After World War II, the 1920 Constitution was reinstated. However, the political dynamic of the Second Republic was defined by the Lager (camp) mentality—a deep division between the "black" (conservative/Christian Social, ÖVP) and "red" (socialist, SPÖ) camps. The system of Proporz meant that public offices and bureaucracies were divided between these two parties at both the federal and state levels.

Consequently, state politics became a reflection of national party competition rather than distinct regional interests. Political parties, trade unions, and interest groups organized along national lines, creating a "unitary social structure" that exerted centralizing pressure on the federation. Austrian scholars often refer to this system as a "centralistic federation" (zentralistischer Bundesstaat), where the states function primarily as administrative subunits executing federal laws rather than as autonomous political entities.

Key policy areas such as education and broadcasting, which were originally matters of state or mixed jurisdiction, were progressively centralized with the cooperation of the state governments themselves. For example, the Constitutional Court ruled in 1954 that broadcasting fell under federal jurisdiction as "telecommunications" rather than state jurisdiction as "culture," a decision that paved the way for a national broadcasting monopoly.

== Current state governments ==
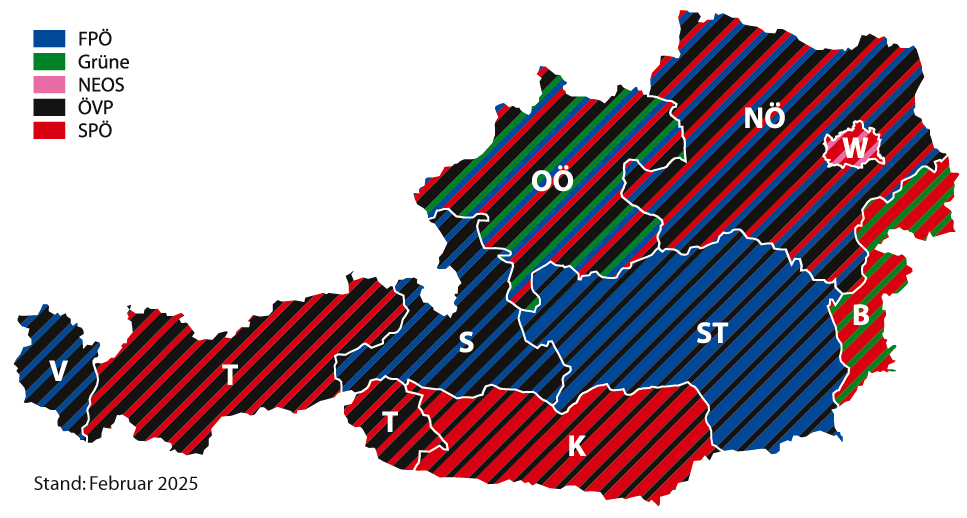
Governing parties in the Landtag

As of July 2025:

- Burgenland: Doskozil III
- Carinthia: Kaiser III
- Lower Austria: Mikl-Leitner III
- Upper Austria: Stelzer II
- Salzburg: Edtstadler
- Styria: Kunasek
- Tyrol: Mattle
- Vorarlberg: Wallner IV
- Vienna: Ludwig III

== See also ==
- Composition of the Austrian provincial parliaments
- Federalism in Austria

== Sources ==
- Erk, Jan (2004). "Austria: A Federation without Federalism". Publius: The Journal of Federalism. 34 (1): 1–20. doi:10.1093/oxfordjournals.pubjof.a003027. JSTOR 3331153.
- Perterer, Manfred (2018-01-30). "Die Zeit der Proporzregierungen ist vorbei" [The time of Proporz governments is over]. Salzburger Nachrichten (in German).
