= Taubensee (Kössen/Unterwössen) =

Lake in Tyrol, Austria

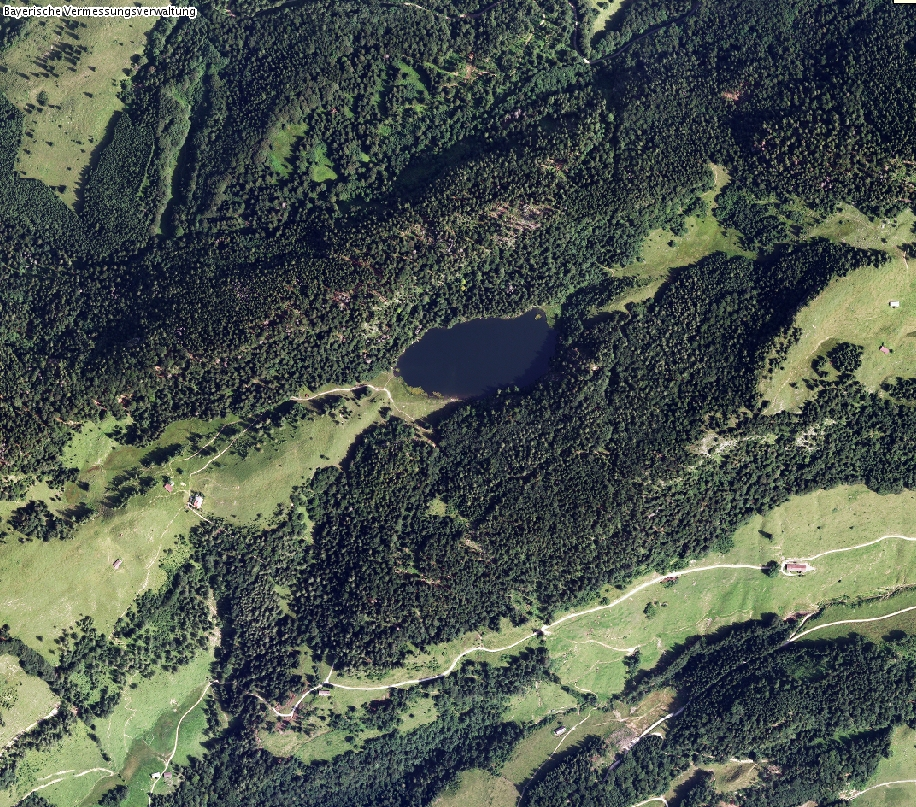

- Location within Tyrol, Austria
- Location: Tyrol, Austria
- Coordinates: 47°41′46″N 12°25′37″E

Taubensee (Kössen/Unterwössen) is a lake of Tyrol, Austria.
