= Frauensee (Bezirk Kufstein) =

Coordinates: 47.4545°N 11.8772°E

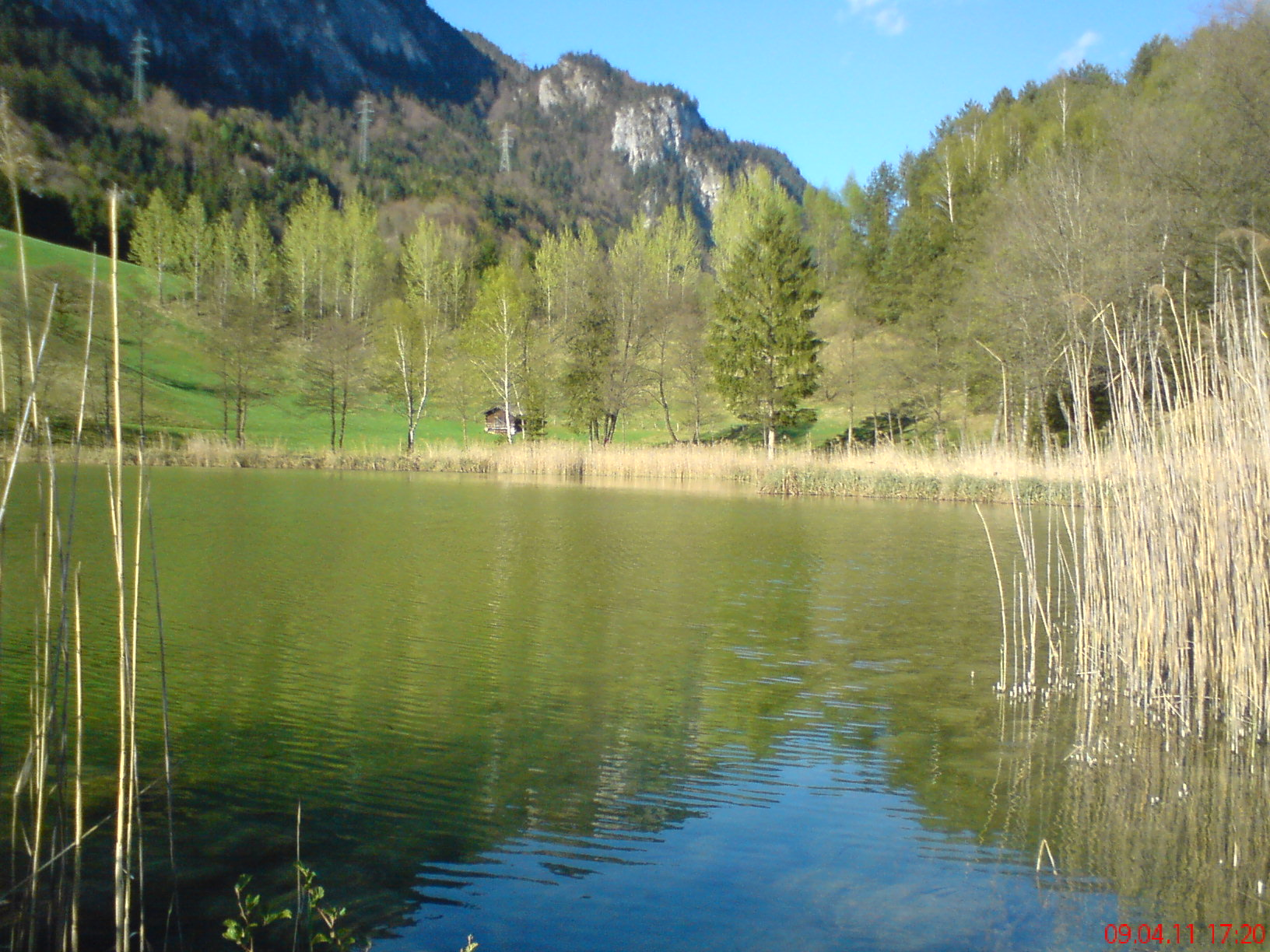

- Location within Tyrol, Austria
- Location: Tyrol
- Type: natural freshwater lake
- Basin countries: Austria
- Max. length: 200 metres (660 ft)
- Max. width: 95 metres (312 ft)

Frauensee (Bezirk Kufstein) is a lake of Tyrol, Austria.
