= NUTS statistical regions of Austria =

Statistical regions of Austria

The Nomenclature of Territorial Units for Statistics (NUTS) is a geocode standard for referencing the subdivisions of Austria for statistical purposes. The standard is developed and regulated by the European Union. The NUTS standard is instrumental in delivering the European Union's Structural Funds. The NUTS code for Austria is AT and a hierarchy of three levels is established by Eurostat. Below these is a further levels of geographic organisation - the local administrative unit (LAU). In Austria, the LAU 2 is municipalities.

== Overall ==
=== NUTS Levels ===
Level	Subdivisions	#
NUTS 1	Groups of states (Gruppen von Bundesländern)	3
NUTS 2	States (Bundesländer)	9
NUTS 3	Groups of Districts (Gruppen von Politischen Bezirken)	35

=== Local administrative units ===
Below the NUTS levels, the two LAU (Local Administrative Units) levels are:

Level	Subdivisions	#
LAU 1	— (same as NUTS 3)	35
LAU 2	Municipalities (Gemeinden)	2357

The LAU codes of Austria can be downloaded here:

== NUTS codes ==
NUTS 1	Code	NUTS 2	Code	NUTS 3	Code
East Austria (Ostösterreich)	AT1	Burgenland	AT11	Mittelburgenland	AT111
East Austria (Ostösterreich)	AT1	Burgenland	AT11	Nordburgenland	AT112
East Austria (Ostösterreich)	AT1	Burgenland	AT11	Südburgenland	AT113
East Austria (Ostösterreich)	AT1	Lower Austria	AT12	Mostviertel-Eisenwurzen	AT121
East Austria (Ostösterreich)	AT1	Lower Austria	AT12	Niederösterreich-Süd	AT122
East Austria (Ostösterreich)	AT1	Lower Austria	AT12	Sankt Pölten	AT123
East Austria (Ostösterreich)	AT1	Lower Austria	AT12	Waldviertel	AT124
East Austria (Ostösterreich)	AT1	Lower Austria	AT12	Weinviertel	AT125
East Austria (Ostösterreich)	AT1	Lower Austria	AT12	Wiener Umland/Nordteil	AT126
East Austria (Ostösterreich)	AT1	Lower Austria	AT12	Wiener Umland/Südteil	AT127
East Austria (Ostösterreich)	AT1	Vienna	AT13	Wien	AT130
Southern Austria (Südösterreich)	AT2	Carinthia	AT21	Klagenfurt-Villach	AT211
Southern Austria (Südösterreich)	AT2	Carinthia	AT21	Oberkärnten	AT212
Southern Austria (Südösterreich)	AT2	Carinthia	AT21	Unterkärnten	AT213
Southern Austria (Südösterreich)	AT2	Styria	AT22	Graz	AT221
Southern Austria (Südösterreich)	AT2	Styria	AT22	Liezen	AT222
Southern Austria (Südösterreich)	AT2	Styria	AT22	Östliche Obersteiermark	AT223
Southern Austria (Südösterreich)	AT2	Styria	AT22	Oststeiermark	AT224
Southern Austria (Südösterreich)	AT2	Styria	AT22	West- und Südsteiermark	AT225
Southern Austria (Südösterreich)	AT2	Styria	AT22	Westliche Obersteiermark	AT226
Western Austria (Westösterreich)	AT3	Upper Austria	AT31	Innviertel	AT311
Western Austria (Westösterreich)	AT3	Upper Austria	AT31	Linz-Wels	AT312
Western Austria (Westösterreich)	AT3	Upper Austria	AT31	Mühlviertel	AT313
Western Austria (Westösterreich)	AT3	Upper Austria	AT31	Steyr-Kirchdorf	AT314
Western Austria (Westösterreich)	AT3	Upper Austria	AT31	Traunviertel	AT315
Western Austria (Westösterreich)	AT3	Salzburg	AT32	Lungau	AT321
Western Austria (Westösterreich)	AT3	Salzburg	AT32	Pinzgau-Pongau	AT322
Western Austria (Westösterreich)	AT3	Salzburg	AT32	Salzburg und Umgebung	AT323
Western Austria (Westösterreich)	AT3	Tyrol	AT33	Außerfern	AT331
Western Austria (Westösterreich)	AT3	Tyrol	AT33	Innsbruck	AT332
Western Austria (Westösterreich)	AT3	Tyrol	AT33	Osttirol	AT333
Western Austria (Westösterreich)	AT3	Tyrol	AT33	Tyrolean Oberland	AT334
Western Austria (Westösterreich)	AT3	Tyrol	AT33	Tyrolean Unterland	AT335
Western Austria (Westösterreich)	AT3	Vorarlberg	AT34	Bludenz-Bregenzer Wald	AT341
Western Austria (Westösterreich)	AT3	Vorarlberg	AT34	Rheintal-Bodenseegebiet	AT342

=== NUTS 3 definitions ===
AT1 Eastern Austria (Ostösterreich)

AT11 Burgenland

AT111 Mittelburgenland (Bezirk Oberpullendorf)
AT112 Nordburgenland (Eisenstadt, Rust, Bezirk Eisenstadt-Umgebung, Bezirk Mattersburg, Bezirk Neusiedl am See)
AT113 Südburgenland (Bezirk Güssing, Bezirk Jennersdorf, Bezirk Oberwart)

AT12 Lower Austria (Niederösterreich)

AT121 Mostviertel-Eisenwurzen (Waidhofen an der Ybbs, Bezirk Amstetten, Bezirk Melk, Bezirk Scheibbs)
AT122 Niederösterreich-Süd (Wiener Neustadt, Bezirk Lilienfeld, Bezirk Neunkirchen, Bezirk Wiener Neustadt-Land)
AT123 Sankt Pölten (Sankt Pölten, Bezirk Sankt Pölten-Land)
AT124 Waldviertel (Krems, Bezirk Gmünd, Bezirk Horn, Bezirk Krems-Land, Bezirk Waidhofen an der Thaya, Bezirk Zwettl)
AT125 Weinviertel (Bezirk Hollabrunn, part of Bezirk Mistelbach, part of Bezirk Gänserndorf)
AT126 Wiener Umland/Nordteil (Bezirk Korneuburg, Bezirk Tulln, part of Bezirken Gänserndorf, part of Bezirk Mistelbach, part of Bezirken Wien-Umgebung)
AT127 Wiener Umland/Südteil (Bezirk Bruck an der Leitha, Bezirk Baden, Bezirk Mödling, part of Bezirk Wien-Umgebung)

AT13 Vienna (Wien)

AT130 Wien

AT2 Southern Austria (Südösterreich)

AT21 Carinthia (Kärnten)

AT211 Klagenfurt-Villach (Klagenfurt, Villach, Bezirk Klagenfurt-Land, Bezirk Villach-Land)
AT212 Oberkärnten (Bezirk Feldkirchen, Bezirk Hermagor, Bezirk Spittal an der Drau)
AT213 Unterkärnten (Bezirk Sankt Veit an der Glan, Bezirk Völkermarkt, Bezirk Wolfsberg)

AT22 Styria (Steiermark)

AT221 Graz (Graz, Bezirk Graz-Umgebung)
AT222 Liezen (Bezirk Liezen)
AT223 Östliche Obersteiermark (Bezirk Bruck an der Mur, Bezirk Leoben, Bezirk Mürzzuschlag)
AT224 Oststeiermark (Bezirk Feldbach, Bezirk Fürstenfeld, Bezirk Hartberg, Bezirk Radkersburg, Bezirk Weiz)
AT225 West- und Südsteiermark (Bezirk Deutschlandsberg, Bezirk Leibnitz, Bezirk Voitsberg)
AT226 Westliche Obersteiermark (Bezirk Judenburg, Bezirk Knittelfeld, Bezirk Murau)

AT3 Western Austria (Westösterreich)

AT31 Upper Austria (Oberösterreich)

AT311 Innviertel (Bezirk Braunau am Inn, Bezirk Grieskirchen, Bezirk Ried im Innkreis, Bezirk Schärding)
AT312 Linz-Wels (Linz, Wels, Bezirk Linz-Land, Bezirk Wels-Land, Bezirk Eferding, part of Bezirk Urfahr-Umgebung)
AT313 Mühlviertel (Bezirk Freistadt, Bezirk Perg, Bezirk Rohrbach, part of Bezirk Urfahr-Umgebung)
AT314 Steyr-Kirchdorf (Steyr, Bezirk Kirchdorf an der Krems, Bezirk Steyr-Land)
AT315 Traunviertel (Bezirk Gmunden, Bezirk Vöcklabruck)

AT32 Salzburg

AT321 Lungau (Bezirk Tamsweg)
AT322 Pinzgau-Pongau (Bezirk Sankt Johann im Pongau, Bezirk Zell am See)
AT323 Salzburg und Umgebung (Salzburg, Bezirk Salzburg-Umgebung, Bezirk Hallein)

AT33 Tyrol (Tirol)

AT331 Außerfern (Bezirk Reutte)
AT332 Innsbruck (Innsbruck, Bezirk Innsbruck Land)
AT333 Osttirol (Bezirk Lienz)
AT334 Tyrolean Oberland (Tiroler Oberland) (Bezirk Imst, Bezirk Landeck)
AT335 Tyrolean Unterland (Tiroler Unterland) (Bezirk Kitzbühel, Bezirk Kufstein, Bezirk Schwaz)

AT34 Vorarlberg

AT341 Bludenz-Bregenzer Wald (Bezirk Bludenz, part of Bezirk Bregenz)
AT342 Rheintal-Bodenseegebiet (Bezirk Dornbirn, Bezirk Feldkirch, part of Bezirk Bregenz)

== See also ==
- Subdivisions of Austria
- ISO 3166-2 codes of Austria
- FIPS region codes of Austria

== Sources ==
- Hierarchical list of the Nomenclature of territorial units for statistics - NUTS and the Statistical regions of Europe
- Overview map of EU Countries - NUTS level 1
  - ÖSTERREICH - NUTS levels
- Correspondence between the NUTS levels and the national administrative units
- List of current NUTS codes
  - Download current NUTS codes (ODS format)
- States of Austria, Statoids.com
- Districts of Austria, Statoids.com
