= Moalandlsee =

- Location within Austria
- Location: Tyrol, Austria
- Coordinates: 47°02′11″N 10°53′06″E
- Type: lake

Moalandlsee is a lake of Tyrol, Austria.
