= Reither See =

- Location within Austria
- Location: Tyrol, Austria
- Coordinates: 47°25′01″N 11°52′31″E
- Type: lake

Reither See is a lake of Tyrol, Austria.
