= Fernsteinsee =

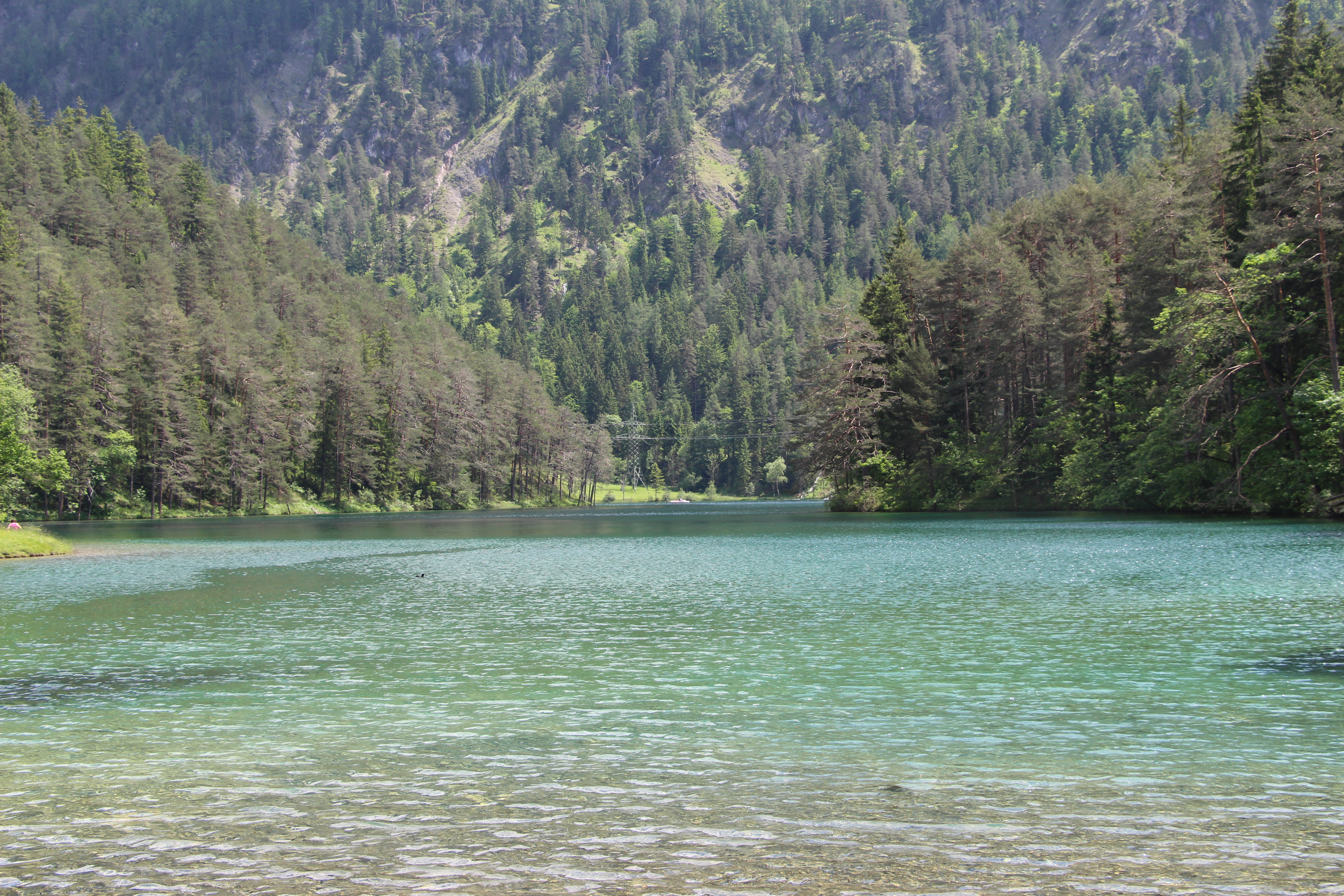
- Fernsteinsee at the Fernpass in Nassereith, Tyrol

- Location within Tyrol, Austria
- Location: Tyrol, Austria
- Coordinates: 47°21′N 10°49′E

Fernsteinsee is a lake of Tyrol, Austria.
