= Tyrolean Eagle-Order =

Honor of the federated state of Tyrol, Austria

Grand Tyrolean Eagle-Order Tiroler Adler-Orden
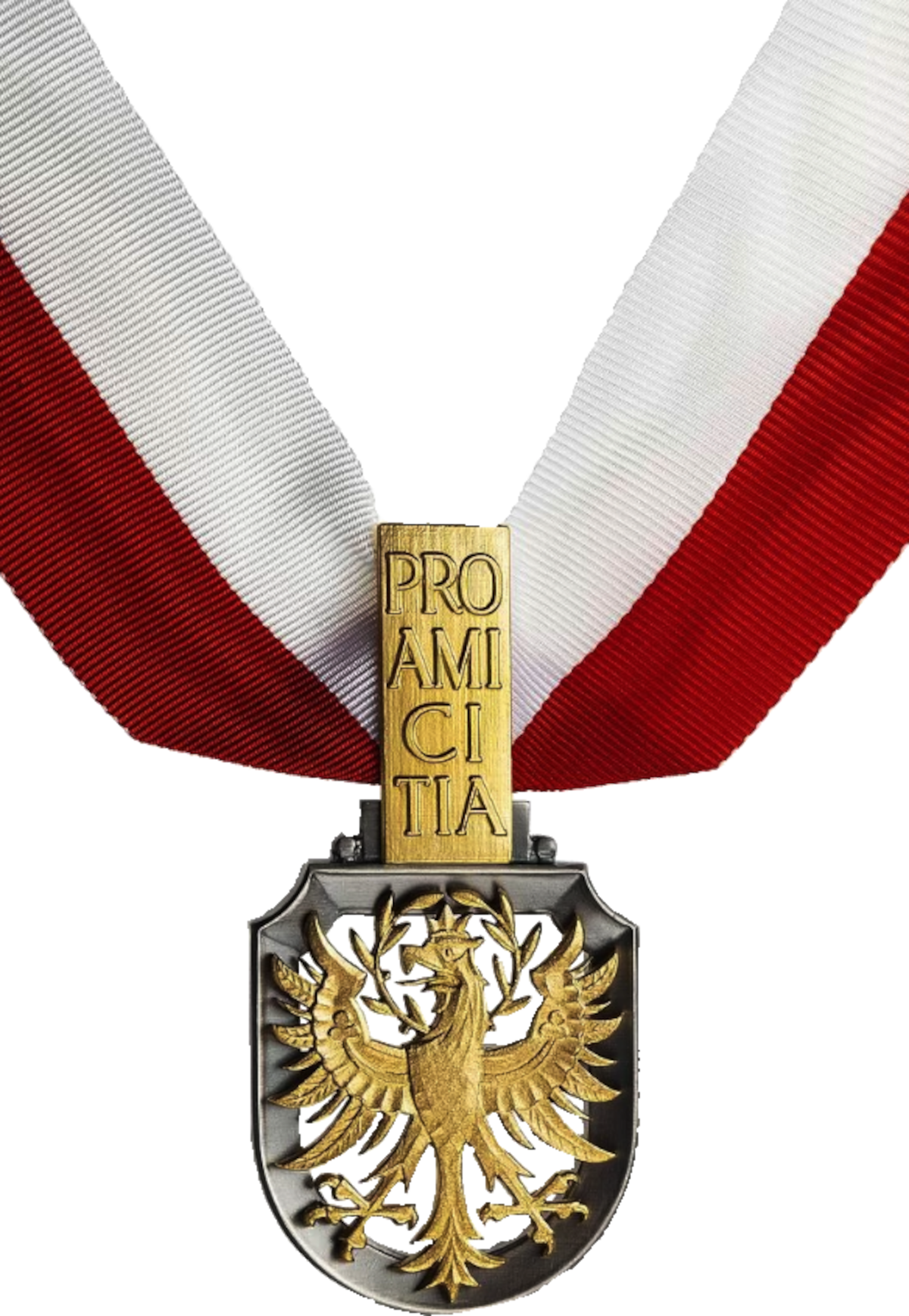
- Type: State Order
- Established: 29 May 1970
- Motto: Pro amicitia ("For friendship")
- Grades: 1

The Tyrolean Eagle-Order (German: Tiroler Adler-Orden) is an honour awarded by the State of Tyrol. It was established by the National Council in 1970. It is awarded to personalities who have an excellent political, economic or cultural relationship with the State of Tyrol. The award ceremony takes place on October 25 of the respective year.

== Classes ==
The order is divided into the 3 classes as follows:

1. Grand Tyrolean Eagle-Order (Großer Tiroler Adler-Orden)
2. Tyrolean Eagle-Order in Gold (Tiroler Adler-Orden in Gold)
3. Tyrolean Eagle-Order in Silver (Tiroler Adler-Orden in Silver)

== Notable recipients ==
Below is a list of notable recipients, in chronological order with year of award in parentheses:.

=== Grand Tyrolean Eagle-Order ===
- Günther Granser
- Herbert Schambeck
- Wolfgang Schmidt
- Gerhard Bletschacher (1973)
- Fritz Molden (1979)
- Ludwig Jedlicka (1976)
- Herbert Batliner (1984)
- Jean Sévillia (1991)
- Peter Schmidhuber (1995)
- Anton Kathrein junior (2001)
- Brigitte Fassbaender (2002)
- Alain de Krassny (2002)
- Walter Hagg (2005)
- Edmund Stoiber (2007)
- Andreas Treichl (2012)
- François Biltgen (2013)
- Emilia Müller (2013)
- Reinhard Olt (2013)
- Axel Diekmann (2014)
- Hanni Wenzel (2016)
- Maha Chakri Sirindhorn (2017)
- Othmar Commenda (2018)
- Jean-Claude Juncker (2019)

=== Tyrolean Eagle-Order in Gold ===
- Ilse Dvorak-Stocker
- Alfred Hartl
- Friedrich Hoppe
- Roderich Regler
- Andreas Resch
- Luigi Ferdinando Tagliavini (1982)
- Holger Magel (1988)
- Horst Seidler (1996)
- Klemens Fischer (2008)
- Eberhard Stüber (2011)
- Alessandro Quaroni (2012)
- Nikolas Stihl (2012)
- Klaus Buchleitner (2016)
- Gert Vogt (2017)
- Ulrike Tanzer (2018)

=== Tyrolean Eagle-Order in Silver ===
- Udo Zehetleitner (2009)
- Erwin Mohr (2014)
- Ramón Jaffé (2015)
- Clemens Bieber (2016)
- Gebhard Kaiser (2016)
- Rudolf Lill
