= Buchsee (Bezirk Kufstein) =

- Location within Austria
- Location: Tyrol, Austria
- Coordinates: 47.4557°N 11.8857°E
- Type: Lake

Buchsee (Bezirk Kufstein) is a lake of Tyrol, Austria.
