= Federalism in Austria =

Administrative divisions of Austria

Federalism in Austria is characterized by a constant struggle between centralist and federalist currents. Already at the founding of the Republic of Austria in the years 1918 to 1920, the states played a decisive role in the development of the political and administrative structures at the state level. In the so-called state conferences, in which representatives of the states and the new central government met in Vienna, it was agreed to constitute the republic as a federal state.

The Austrian Federal Constitution, finally adopted in 1920 and largely drafted by legal scholar Hans Kelsen, envisaged a federal state with nine member states. The resulting federalism was weak, as most important powers, especially in financial matters, were assigned to the federal government. This distribution of powers reflected the different ideas of the two dominant political forces: the Christian Social Party, who supported federalism, and the Social Democratic Party of Austria, who preferred a centralized state. The constitution was largely provisional and incomplete, and it was not until the constitutional reform of 1925 under Chancellor Rudolf Ramek that the distribution of powers was finally regulated.

The constitution of the authoritarian corporate state of 1934 brought a further push towards centralization. All state laws required the approval of the Federal Chancellor, and the state governor was appointed by the Federal President. With the annexation of Austria to Germany in 1938, federalism in Austria was completely abolished. After the Second World War, the 1929 constitution was reinstated. In the decades that followed, the states campaigned for a strengthening of their position within the federal state, and the demands of the states gradually led to an expansion of their powers.

Austria's efforts to join the European Union were supported by the state governors from the outset, and their commitment played a key role in ensuring that two-thirds of the Austrian population voted in favour of joining the EU in a referendum in 1994. In return for their support, the states were promised comprehensive federal reform in the so-called Perchtoldsdorf Agreement of 1992, which has, however, not been implemented by any of the subsequent federal governments to date. The results of the 2005 Austrian Convention, which dealt with a reform of federalism, have also not been put into practice.

== Development of Austrian Federalism ==
=== Foundation of the Republic (1918–1920) ===
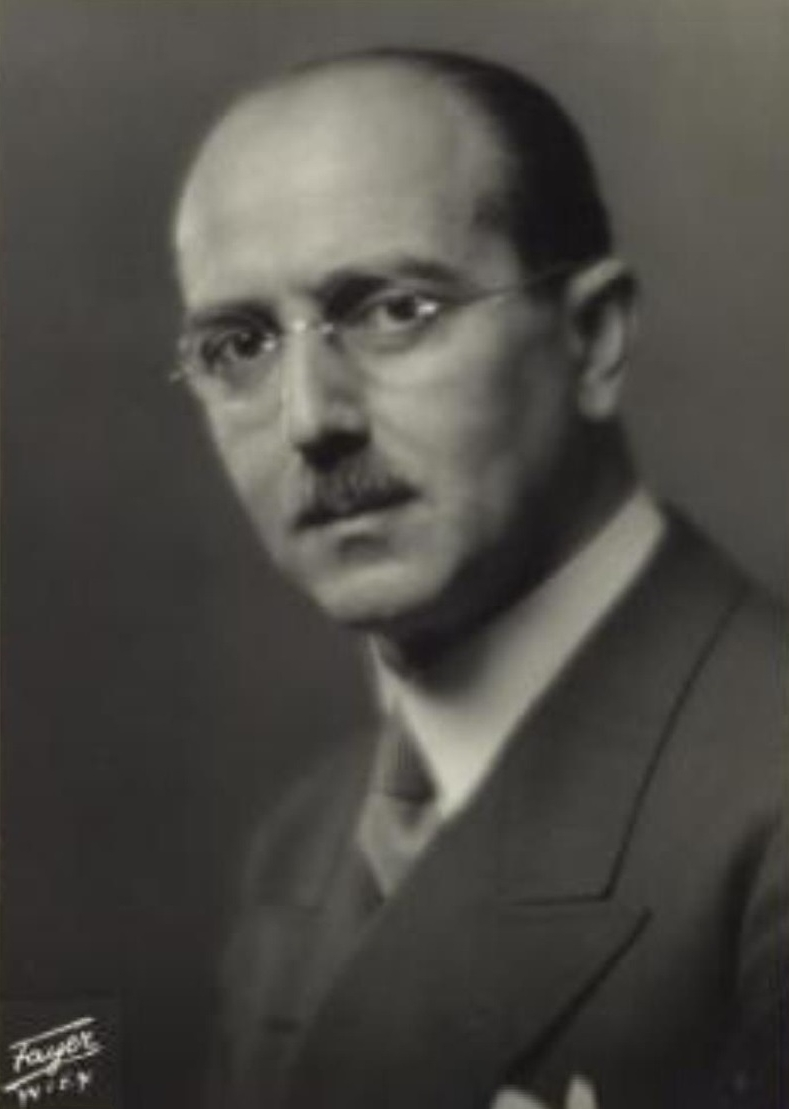
Hans Kelsen, Architect of the Austrian federal constitution

The founding of the Republic of Austria after the First World War was closely linked to the question of the future state structure. In the period from 1918 to 1920, the political landscape was shaped by the debate between centralism and federalism. After the defeat of Austria-Hungary in the First World War, the monarchy collapsed and numerous new states emerged, including a much smaller Austria. On November 12, 1918, the provisional National Assembly proclaimed the Republic of Austria.

Initially, the idea of a federal system was not a priority. The desire for annexation to Germany, which was favored by many, especially the Social Democrats, spoke in favor of establishing a centralized unitary state. However, the former crown lands of the Habsburg Monarchy, which had a certain federalist tradition, soon began to pursue their own interests. Some of these states, such as Vorarlberg, Tyrol, Salzburg, Carinthia, Styria, Upper Austria and Lower Austria, had their own state systems. The Christian Social Party, which has strong representation in the states, advocated for a federal system, while the Social Democrats who were dominant in Vienna supported a centralized state.

In May 1919, a conference was held in Salzburg at which the representatives of the states emphasized the federal plans of the Christian Socials over the centralist ideas of the Social Democrats. Austrian federalism ultimately emerged from a compromise between these two forces. The Federal Constitution, which came into force on 1 October 1920, envisaged a centralised federal state. Despite the compromise character of the constitution, it was already clear in the founding phase that the states would play an important role in the Austrian federal state. In the so-called Länder Conferences of 1919, in which representatives of the states and the new central government met in Vienna, it was agreed that the republic should be built up as a federal state. The strong involvement of the states in the founding of the state is still emphasized in Austrian politics today.

The Federal Constitution of 1920, which was largely drafted by Hans Kelsen, was based on central structural principles laid down in Articles 1 and 2 of the Federal Constitution Act. In addition to the democratic and republican principle and the principle of the rule of law, this also includes the federal principle. This principle involves the division of state functions and tasks between the federal government and the states. Both the federal government and the states have the right to enact laws and ensure their enforcement within their respective areas of responsibility. The founding phase of Austrian federalism was thus a time of negotiation and compromise. The tensions between the desire for unity and the pursuit of regional autonomy shaped the political debates and led to a constitution that still forms the basis for the Austrian state today.

=== First Republic, Austrofascism and World War II (1920–1945) ===
Austrian federalism in the First Republic (1920–1934) was characterized by a complex dynamic between centralist tendencies and the states' striving for autonomy. The Federal Constitution of 1920 created the basis for a federal state, which, however, had a strong centralist orientation from the outset. Although the constitution provided for a distribution of powers between the federal government and the states, most important areas were within the legislative competence of the federal government. In financial matters in particular, the federal government had the upper hand, which limited the states' scope for action.

The states' participation in federal legislation was only weakly pronounced through the Federal Council, the second chamber of parliament. The Federal Council had a right of veto, but could be outvoted by the National Council, the first chamber.

This asymmetry in the distribution of power meant that in practice the Federal Council played a rather subordinate role and the National Council dominated legislation. Despite the centralist orientation of Austrian federalism, the states played an important role in the political system of the First Republic. They had their own constitutions, parliaments and governments and were responsible for the administration of important areas such as education, security and health care. The states also had a certain degree of financial autonomy, which allowed them to set their own political priorities. The state governors, who had significant weight in federal politics as representatives of the states, used their position to develop political strategies and influence federal policy at regular state conferences. In these conferences, which were attended by representatives of both the state governments and the federal government, they were able to articulate their interests and work out common solutions.

In addition to the formal institutional regulations, Austrian federalism in the First Republic was also characterized by informal practices and political compromises. The close cooperation between the federal government and the states in administration led to an interweaving of the two levels, which resulted in a form of executive federalism. Many tasks were carried out by the states on behalf of the federal government, which strengthened the position of the federal government, but at the same time also gave the states a certain degree of creative power in the practical implementation of federal laws.

The period of Austrofascism between 1934 and 1938 was marked by a dramatic change in the nature of Austrian federalism. After the February Uprising of 1934, Chancellor Engelbert Dollfuß established the Federal State of Austria, an authoritarian, clerical regime. Although this regime maintained federalist structures, it actively pursued centralizing policies. A major change was the need for the approval of the Federal Chancellor for all state laws. This reduced the legislative autonomy of the states and strengthened the authority of the federal government. In addition, the Federal President was given the power to appoint the state governor, which led to a further concentration of power at the federal level. This effectively transformed the state governors from representatives of their respective states into executive agents of the central government. These changes, although implemented without much political opposition, undermined the federal structure of the constitution.

The centralization process could also be observed in the education system. Before 1934, the states enjoyed considerable autonomy in educational matters. However, the authoritarian regime of the corporate state strove to standardize the school system in order to promote national unity. The Concordat between the Holy See and the Republic of Austria shifted control of education from the states to the federal government. This move was supported by representatives of the states in the Federal Council, which illustrated the prevailing mindset of prioritizing national unity over state autonomy. This effectively reduced the cultural and educational diversity previously promoted by the federal system. Until 1938, Austria was only formally a federal state, but in practice it functioned like a unitary state.

However, this chapter of Austrian federalism came to an abrupt end with the annexation of Austria to Nazi Germany in 1938. The Nazis reorganized the Austrian states, redrawn borders and merged some federal states, reducing the number of administrative regions to seven Reichsgaue. This eliminated any trace of Austria's previously existing federal structure and integrated the country into Nazi Germany's highly centralized administrative system.

=== Second Republic (from 1945) ===
After World War II, the Austrian Constitution of 1920, which had been suspended during the Nazi era, was reinstated. A long period of stagnation followed, during which the states mainly replicated federal constitutional law and acted remarkably passively until the late 1960s. This led to Austria's federal system being described as highly centralised, with the federal government playing a dominant role and the states exercising their legislative powers in limited areas.

A turning point was the constitutional amendment of 1974, which led to major changes in state politics and a gradual increase in the powers of the states, strengthening their self-confidence. The states began to actively adapt their constitutions, especially with regard to the rules for forming a government and direct democracy. The western states in particular used the new doctrine of "relative autonomy" to strengthen their regional identity and demand a more pronounced role in federal politics..

The Conference of State Governors, a coordinating body of the states that has met regularly since 1970, played a crucial role in promoting federal reforms. The conference's requirement for unanimous decisions ensured that each state had a strong voice. However, the true strength of the state governors lies in their dual role as top politicians of their respective state parties. This political influence was reflected in their strong support for Austria's accession to the EU. Their commitment was instrumental in securing a two-thirds majority in the 1994 EU accession referendum.

However, the involvement of the states in the EU decision-making processes has shown the limitations of the Conference of State Governors. Organising a large conference with all nine states in a timely manner proved impractical and hindered efficient responses to the demands of European integration. Consequently, the conference served mainly as a platform for formulating positions and declarations, with the actual decision-making process taking place informally by the staff of the state administrations..

Austria's accession to the EU also brought to the fore the question of state rights in EU affairs. Before joining the EU, the federal government and the states could decide matters independently of each other and only had to make agreements within Austria. However, joining the EU plunged them into a larger political arena with up to 28 member states at one point, each with different interests and making binding decisions. The state parliaments, although formally able to influence their state's position in EU affairs, rarely exercise these rights due to limited administrative resources.

Despite promises of comprehensive federal reforms under the 1992 Perchtoldsdorf Agreement in recognition of their support for EU accession, subsequent federal governments, lacking the necessary constitutional majority in parliament, failed to implement them. A similar fate befell the results of the 2005 Austrian Convention, a constitutional assembly dealing with federal issues. This blockage of federal reforms stems from the persistence of established constitutional regulations and the reluctance of political actors to engage in comprehensive reforms that could endanger their spheres of influence.

The debate about federalism in Austria often revolves around the need to reform the Federal Council, the second chamber of parliament. The need for reform is widely recognized. The public perceives the Federal Council as superfluous and insignificant, with a 2014 poll finding that 54% of Austrians supported its abolition.

Several factors contribute to this negative perception. First, the composition of the Federal Council corresponds to that of the National Council, meaning that it does not represent the states or political parties in a significantly different sense. This undermines its legitimacy. Second, the powers of the Federal Council are limited. It functions mainly as a review body with limited veto rights, especially in financial matters affecting the states. Third, the members of the Federal Council are indirectly elected by the state parliaments and often feel beholden to their political parties. This further reduces their perceived independence and effectiveness.

Various reform proposals were put forward, including changing the recruitment process to a direct election, binding members to a mandatory mandate from their federal states and extending the veto and control rights of the Federal Council. However, these proposals failed to gain approval due to fears of potential shifts in power between the main political institutions and parties.

In addition to the Federal Council, the reform of Austrian fiscal federalism is crucial for a more balanced and efficient federal system. The current system is characterized by several problems. There is a lack of transparency and accountability in the financial relations between the federal government and the states.. There is also a strong dependence on community taxes, while the emphasis on state governments' own revenues is weak. In addition, there is an urgent need for greater clarity and accountability in the allocation of tasks and expenditure between the different levels of government.

Experts advocate several measures to strengthen the federal system. They call for strengthening subnational governments by expanding their tax sovereignty and reducing dependence on community taxes to promote financial equivalence and accountability. They also propose conducting comprehensive functional analyses to identify and eliminate inefficiencies and overlaps in responsibilities at different levels of government, particularly in key policy areas such as health, transport and education. Finally, the introduction of a more transparent and performance-based system for intergovernmental transfers is recommended, which clearly separates allocative and distributive objectives.

Despite widespread recognition of the need for reform, the path forward remains complex and politically challenging. States that advocate for greater autonomy in domestic policy often resist changes that could alter the distribution of rights and responsibilities between the federal and state governments. Meaningful and sustainable reform requires political will, a comprehensive approach, and a commitment to finding solutions that benefit all levels of government and the citizens they serve.

== Distribution of Competences and Institutions of Federalism ==
=== Distribution of competences between the federal government and the states ===
The Austrian federal system divides legislative and administrative responsibilities between the federal government and the nine states. This distribution of powers is a defining feature of Austrian federalism and determines the balance of power between the federal government and the states. The Austrian Federal Constitution sets the framework for the distribution of these powers. Articles 10 to 15 of the Federal Constitution are specifically dedicated to the delimitation of the respective areas of responsibility of the federal government and the states:

Federal Constitution
Art. 10	Art. 11	Art. 12	Art. 13	Art. 14	Art. 14a	Art. 14a	Art. 14b	Art. 15	Art. 15a

The Austrian federal system is based on the principle of exclusive competences, which means that a given subject matter falls under the competence of either the federal government or the states. There are no provisions for shared or concurrent competences. Article 10 of the B-VG contains a detailed list of matters that fall exclusively within the competence of the federal government. This list includes key areas such as citizenship, national defence, foreign policy, finance, trade and the judiciary. In addition, Article 15 paragraph 1 of the B-VG stipulates that all matters not explicitly assigned to the federal government in the constitution fall within the autonomous competence of the states. This suggests a system in which the states have considerable residual competences. In practice, however, the extensive and detailed catalogue of federal competences means that the states are left with a comparatively limited range of residual competences.

==== Federal Council ====
The Federal Council is the second chamber of the Austrian parliament and represents the interests of the nine states. It plays a role in federal legislation, but a limited one. The composition of the Federal Council depends on the number of eligible voters in each state, with the number of members per state varying between three and twelve. The members are elected by the respective state parliaments.

The Federal Council's duties focus mainly on reviewing laws passed by the National Council, the stronger and more important chamber of parliament. The Federal Council has a suspensive veto right that allows it to delay the adoption of federal laws that affect the interests of the states. However, this veto can be overridden by the National Council by a simple majority, except in some specific cases where a qualified majority is required. This limited power highlights the weakness of the Federal Council in influencing federal legislation

The Federal Council's limited influence results from its lack of significant legislative powers. While it can propose changes to legislation, these are not binding on the National Council. In addition, the Federal Council is not involved in the budget process, which further reduces its ability to effectively represent the interests of the states in federal policy.

==== State parliaments ====
The state parliaments are unicameral parliaments that act as legislative bodies at the state level. Their members, the state parliament members, are elected by the citizens of each state according to the principle of proportional representation. The state parliaments are responsible for passing laws that fall within the legislative competence of their respective states. These competences mainly include areas such as building regulations, spatial planning and environmental protection.

One of the central tasks of the state parliaments is the election of the state governments, including the state governor. This electoral process creates a direct link between the legislative and executive powers at the state level.

In addition to their legislative function, the state parliaments exercise control over the state administration by reviewing the activities of the state government and holding it accountable. This control function includes mechanisms such as parliamentary inquiries, interpellations and committees of inquiry, similar to the instruments of the National Council at the federal level.

==== State governments ====
The state governments, led by the governor, form the executive branch at the state level. They are responsible for implementing the laws passed by the state parliaments and for administering state affairs. The composition of the state governments is determined by the respective state constitution, with the size and structure varying from state to state.

The state governors occupy a particularly prominent position within the state structures. They are heads of government, chair the meetings of the state government, lead the state administration and represent the state vis-à-vis the federal government and other states. Historically, a system of proportional government dominated in most Austrian states, in which the strongest parties were represented in the state government in proportion to their strength. However, this system has largely been replaced by single-party or coalition governments, with the exception of Lower Austria and Upper Austria, which continue to have proportional governments. Vienna has a unique system with a state government (City Senate) that is composed proportionally, but includes acting city councilors and government members without their own area of responsibility (without portfolio).

==== Cooperative elements ====
Although the formal institutional structure suggests a clear separation between federal and state levels, cooperative elements play a crucial role in Austrian federalism. Two important examples are the Conference of State Governors and the Liaison Office of the Federal States.

The State Governors Conference is a regular meeting of all nine state governors to discuss and coordinate common interests. Although not enshrined in the constitution, it has developed into an important platform for cooperation between the levels of government. Decisions in the State Governors' Conference are usually made by consensus, which requires the consent of all participating state governors. Although not enshrined in the constitution, it has developed into an important platform for cooperation between the levels of government. Decisions in the State Governors' Conference are usually made by consensus, which requires the consent of all participating state governors.

The Liaison Office of the Federal States, based in Vienna, serves as the permanent secretariat of the Conference of Governors and provides administrative and logistical support for its meetings and activities. It plays an important role in promoting communication and the exchange of information between the states. The Liaison Office also supports the states in formulating their positions vis-à-vis the Federal Government and represents their collective interests in various national and international bodies. The activities of the Liaison Office contribute to a coordinated approach by the states in their interactions with the Federal Government and other actors and promote cooperation between the levels of government beyond the formal institutional structures.

== Fiscal federalism in Austria ==
=== Foundation of Austrian fiscal federalism ===
The Austrian system of fiscal federalism is based on the principle of separate financial systems for the federation and the nine states, with the instrument of fiscal equalization. This system, which is anchored in the Austrian Federal Constitution, assigns significant taxation powers to the federation, while the states have residual competences. The Austrian system is characterized by a high degree of financial integration between the federation and the states, enabled by various institutions and organizations, leading to its description as a cooperative federalism model.

The federal government has extensive taxation powers that cover a wide range of taxes. The Fiscal Constitution Act empowers federal legislation to regulate the distribution of taxing rights and revenue shares at all levels of government, which highlights the central role of the federal government in fiscal matters. However, this centralist tendency is mitigated by a system of fiscal equalization, which is designed to ensure that states with lower tax revenues can provide public services at a comparable level to wealthier states. This distribution of tax revenues between the federal government and the states through the fiscal policy instrument of fiscal equalization is a complex, periodically renegotiated contractual arrangement. This system attempts to balance the financial needs of the states with the requirement of fiscal discipline at the federal level.

=== Reformdiskussionen und Herausforderungen ===
Reform discussions related to Austrian fiscal federalism focus on increasing the financial autonomy of the states, in particular by granting them a larger share of tax revenues and greater control over their expenditures. Proponents of reform argue that this would improve accountability and responsiveness to regional needs, which could lead to more efficient delivery of public services. The call for reform also extends to strengthening the role of municipalities within Austria's multi-level system. Although recognized as an essential part of the system, municipalities lack a strong constitutional voice and are often treated as junior partners within the federal structure. This has led to calls for greater local representation and participation in decision-making processes (e.g. through the Association of Municipalities) that directly affect their functions and responsibilities.

However, the implementation of meaningful reforms faces significant challenges, particularly due to resistance from the states themselves. The current system, although criticised for its centralist aspects, has provided the states with a predictable and relatively stable revenue stream that often exceeds their expenditure needs. This financial security, coupled with their political influence through bodies such as the Conference of State Governors, makes them reluctant to give up any control over their financial affairs.

== Europeanization of Austrian federalism ==
=== Influence of EU membership on the distribution of competences ===
The accession of Austria to the European Union (EU) in 1995 had a profound impact on the country's federal system, particularly in two key areas: the distribution of competences between the federal government and the states, and the participation of the states in EU policy-making. The influence of the EU has not fundamentally changed the basic structure of Austrian federalism. However, it has contributed to strengthening existing features such as the specific division of competences and the importance of executive federalism. The states have taken a more active role in EU policy-making through various mechanisms, thereby representing their interests and maintaining the relevance of Austrian federalism in the European context.

==== Participation of the states in EU policy-making ====
The influence of the EU on the distribution of competences has been significant. Although the Austrian federal system is generally considered centralist, with the federation playing a dominant role, EU membership has required adjustments and a greater emphasis on cooperation. This is because EU law often touches on areas that fall within the legislative competence of the states, such as agriculture, the environment and transport. As a result, states needed to be more actively involved in EU affairs to protect their interests and make their voices heard.

The states have become important actors in shaping Austria's EU policy. This participation takes place primarily through the state participation procedure, a procedure enshrined in Article 23d of the Austrian Federal Constitution. This procedure obliges the Federal Government to inform the states immediately about all EU initiatives that affect their independent competences or that could be of interest to them. The states are also given the opportunity to comment on these initiatives. The weight of these opinions depends on factors such as the number of states involved and the relevance of the issue to them. If all states have a uniform position on a matter that affects their legislative area, the Federal Government is bound by it. Deviations are only permitted for compelling reasons of integration or foreign policy, which must be communicated to the states immediately.

In addition to the Länder participation procedure, the Austrian Landtage also participate in the subsidiarity review. This mechanism introduced by the EU aims to ensure that decisions are taken at the most appropriate level of government. The Landtage, through their administrations, actively participate in the review of EU initiatives for possible subsidiarity concerns. In this process, certain Länder are often assigned the task of reviewing initiatives that fall within their area of competence, which further highlights the role of the Länder in safeguarding their interests within the EU framework..

==== Europäische Verbünde für Territoriale Zusammenarbeit ====
The establishment of European Groupings of Territorial Cooperation (EGTC) was another important consequence of Austria's EU membership. EGTCs provide a legal framework for cross-border cooperation between regional and local authorities of different EU Member States. This instrument has proven particularly relevant in Austria, as many of its regional authorities share borders with foreign states.

For example, Austria formally participates in two established EGTCs: the European Region of Tyrol-South Tyrol-Trentino and the Euregio Senza Confini (Euregio without Borders). Both are Euroregions that aim to promote cooperation between Austrian and Italian regional authorities in various areas. While these first EGTCs were aimed at general cooperation purposes, there have been discussions and initiatives to set up EGTCs with more specific objectives. One example is the Alpine Pearls EGTC, which aims to promote sustainable tourism in a cross-border region covering Austria, Germany, Slovenia, Italy, Switzerland and France. This diversification of EGTC types reflects the growing recognition of their potential to address specific cross-border challenges and opportunities.

== Current challenges and reform discussions ==
Austria is a federal republic consisting of nine autonomous federal states. The country's federal system, established in 1920, is characterized by a high degree of integration between the federal government, states and municipalities. However, it is widely viewed as highly centralized, with the federal government playing a dominant role and the states exercising only limited legislative powers. This has led to ongoing debates and calls for reforms to address the challenges and weaknesses of Austrian federalism. However, the debate about the future of Austrian federalism remains alive, driven by a growing awareness of the system's weaknesses and the need for a more balanced and responsive model of government. The reform discourse must address the complexities of the existing system, consider the impact of European integration, and find ways to strengthen democratic accountability and transparency.

=== Centralization tendencies and federal dominance ===
Despite the formal federal structure, Austrian federalism is characterized by a persistent trend towards centralization. The Federal Council, the second chamber of parliament, which is supposed to represent the interests of the states in federal legislation, has only limited powers and is generally considered politically weak. This is partly due to its composition: members of the Federal Council are appointed by the state parliaments and are subject to party discipline rather than representing the interests of their states. In contrast, the National Council, the first chamber of parliament, has exclusive federal competence in legislation and administration, further strengthening the dominance of the federal government. The financial dominance of the federal government also contributes to the centralist tendencies in Austrian federalism. The main revenues of all levels of government are generated through a common tax system, with the federal government ultimately determining the distribution of financial resources through financial equalization. This means that states and municipalities have little financial autonomy and are heavily dependent on federal subsidies.

=== Complexity of the distribution of competences ===
The distribution of powers between the federal government and the states is another area where Austrian federalism faces challenges. Although the constitution formally assigns residual powers to the states, the catalogue-like scope of federal affairs is extensive and detailed, which severely limits the states' scope for action. This has led to a complex and often unclear distribution of powers, with overlapping powers and a lack of transparency. The federal government has also been able to expand its influence through the use of competence coverage clauses in federal laws, which secure the federal government's legislative and executive powers in areas that would otherwise fall within the jurisdiction of the states.

=== Lack of transparency and democratic legitimacy ===
The centralization of power and the complex distribution of competences have raised concerns about the transparency and democratic legitimacy of Austrian federalism. The unclear lines of responsibility make it difficult for citizens to hold their elected representatives accountable. In addition, the dominance of the federation and the weakness of the Federal Council have limited the ability of the states to effectively represent the interests of their citizens at the federal level.

=== Financial imbalances and the need for a reform of the fiscal equalization system ===
The current fiscal equalization system in Austria is widely criticized for its complexity and lack of transparency, which leads to financial imbalances between the states. The complicated network of transfers and financial interdependencies between the federal government, states and municipalities makes it difficult to assess the distributional and allocative effects of the system. This can perpetuate financial disparities and hinder efficient implementation of policies, especially in areas such as health and education.

=== Discussion on strengthening the states and federalism reform ===
The challenges of Austrian federalism have fuelled ongoing discussions and calls for reforms. While there is broad agreement on the need for change, there is less consensus on the concrete measures. Some experts and politicians are calling for a more decentralised system with more autonomy and financial resources for the states. They argue that this would improve democratic accountability, enable tailored policy solutions to regional needs and promote innovation through interregional competition. Others are committed to strengthening cooperation mechanisms between the federal and state governments, with a focus on better coordination and streamlining decision-making processes.

Reform efforts are hampered by a lack of political will, particularly on the part of the federal government, which is reluctant to hand over power to the states. The countries themselves are also criticized for their lack of cohesion and unwillingness to compromise. Despite these challenges, the debate on the future of Austrian federalism remains active, accompanied by calls for a fundamental reassessment of the current system and the development of a more balanced and responsive model of governance.

=== Overlap in EU affairs and national laws ===
Despite these challenges, the debate on the future of Austrian federalism remains active, accompanied by calls for a fundamental reassessment of the current system and the development of a more balanced and responsive model of governance. As the EU expanded its powers, the boundaries between federal and state responsibilities became blurred, raising concerns about an erosion of state autonomy in areas such as agriculture, environmental protection and regional development.

The Austrian constitution provides for the so-called Länder participation procedure, which is intended to ensure the participation of the Länder in EU matters that concern their competences. This procedure obliges the federal government to inform the Länder about all relevant EU projects and to give them the opportunity to comment. While the dissemination of information works well in practice, the influence of the Länder's statements depends on various factors, including the number of intervening countries and the uniformity of their views. If the Länder issue a uniform statement on an EU project that concerns a matter of Länder legislation, this becomes a binding mandate for the federal government. However, the federal government can deviate from this mandate for integration and foreign policy reasons. While this arrangement allows flexibility in negotiations, it also raises fears that the federal government could override the interests of the Länder in favor of overarching EU goals.

=== Dominance of the executive and party politics ===
A feature of Austrian federalism is the strong power of the state governors, who have great influence in their states and play an important role in negotiations between the federal government and the states. This strong executive power, combined with the historically anchored system of proportional representation, in which government positions are distributed proportionally between the major political parties, has led to a culture of consensus-seeking and backroom deals. This often happened at the expense of transparency and open political debate, further weakening the democratic legitimacy of the system.

=== Calls for decentralization and reform in the context of pandemic and climate change ===
The COVID-19 pandemic has highlighted the weaknesses of Austrian federalism and the need for a more decentralized and efficient system. The pandemic exposed the limitations of the current distribution of competences: Overlapping responsibilities and unclear responsibilities led to confusion and delays in the implementation of public health measures. This has fuelled calls for a review of the federal system, with some commentators arguing for the transfer of certain powers from the federal government to the states, particularly in areas such as health, education and environmental protection.

Likewise, the urgent need for action on climate change has highlighted the need for a more effective and coordinated response from all levels of government. This has led to calls for a stronger role for the states in climate policy, as their proximity to local communities enables them to tailor measures specifically to regional needs.

=== Financial imbalances and local government reform ===
The financial disparities between the states and the fiscal dependence of municipalities on federal subsidies remain significant challenges for Austrian federalism. Experts argue that municipalities with fewer than 1,000 inhabitants are not financially viable and should be merged into more efficient administrative units. Others propose shifting more tasks to the indirect federal administration, where tasks are carried out locally but under rules set by the federal government.

== See also ==
- Subdivisions of Austria
- Federalism in Germany
- Federalism in Switzerland

== Sources ==
- Erk, Jan (2004). "Austria: A Federation without Federalism". Publius: The Journal of Federalism. 34 (1): 1–20. doi:10.1093/oxfordjournals.pubjof.a003027 (inactive 14 April 2026). JSTOR 3331153.
