= Grünausee =

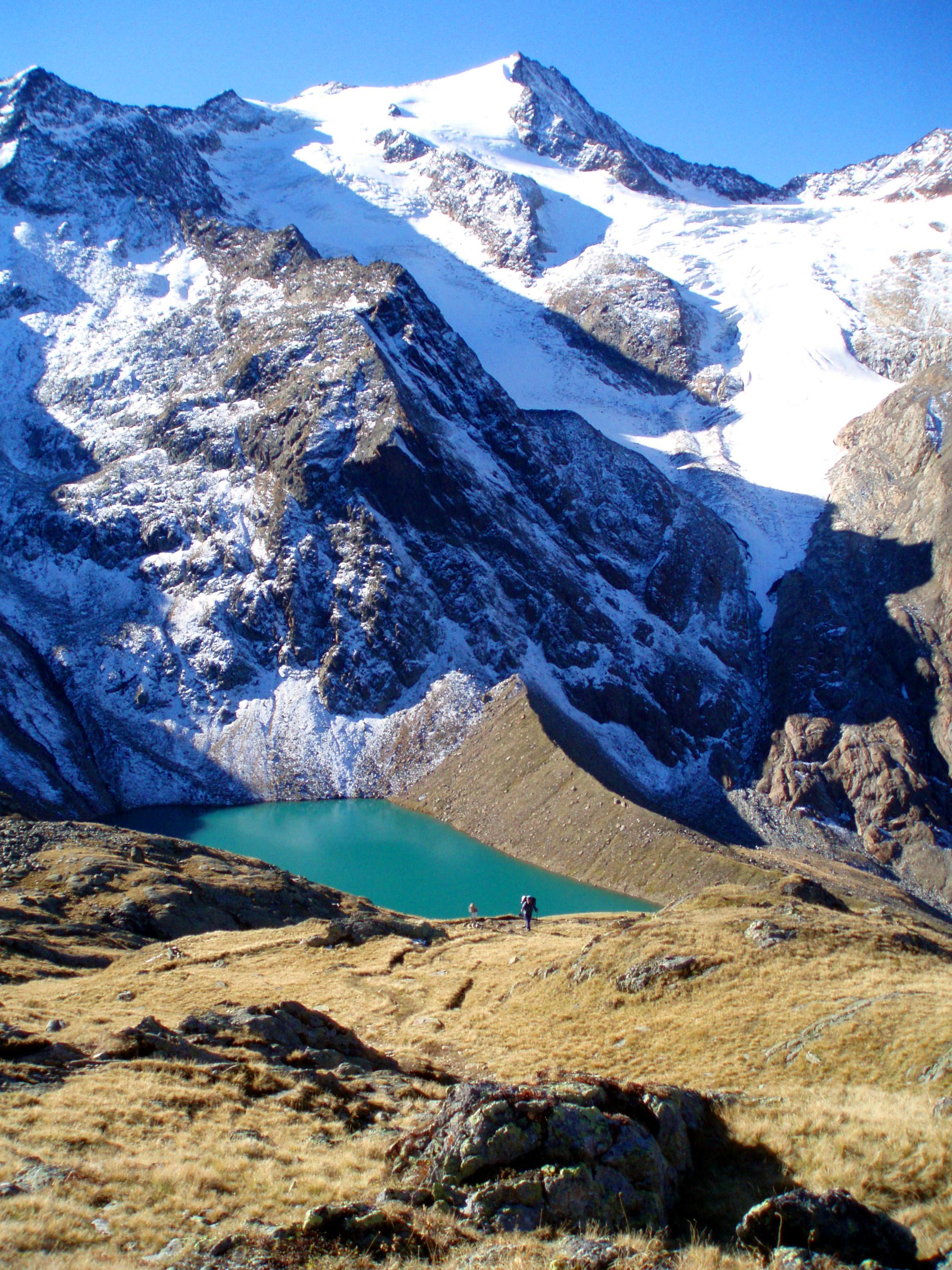

- Location within Tyrol, Austria
- Location: Tyrol, Austria
- Coordinates: 46°59′20″N 11°11′58″E

Grünausee is a lake of Tyrol, Austria.
