= Gritzer See =

- Location within Tyrol, Austria
- Location: Tyrol, Austria
- Coordinates: 46°56′36″N 12°22′57″E

Gritzer See is a lake of Tyrol, Austria.
