= Subdivisions of Austria =

Subdivisions of Austria:

- Locality
- Cadastral community
- Municipality
- District (Austria)
- States of Austria
- NUTS statistical regions of Austria
- ISO 3166-2:AT
- Seven telephone areas: see Telephone numbers in Austria
