= Außerfern =

Area of Tyrol, Austria

Coordinates: 47°30′N 10°43′E

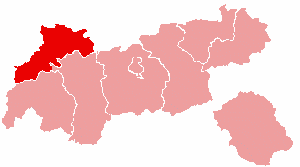
Außerfern
Basic data
State:	Tyrol
Administrative centre:	Reutte
Area:	1,236.82 km^{2} (477.54 sq mi)
Population:	31,584 (15 May 2001)
Population density:	26 people/km²
Car number plate:	RE
Website:
Map

Außerfern (German pronunciation: [ˈaʊ̯sɐfɛʁn]) refers to the district of Reutte in the Austrian federal state of Tyrol.

== Etymology ==
The name is probably derived from Außer dem Fern ("beyond the Fern" where Fern is the Fern Pass). Außer- ("outer") and Inner- ("inner") in the Tyrolese dialect are common prefixes to the name of a valley and distinguish the mouth of the valley from its upper reaches, or the section of a valley downstream of its main settlement from the upstream regions, or simply the directions into and out of the valley. Außerfern may possible refer, therefore, to the valley up to the historic climb to the Fern Pass.

== History ==
The region was settled from the 10th century along the Via Claudia Augusta by Alamanni. At the end of the 13th century it became part of the County of Tyrol through the imperial agreement (Reichseinigung) of Duke Meinhard, however the Außerfern's close economic and cultural relationships with the Allgäu region remained. For example, the Außerfern was for a long time placed ecclesiastically under the Bishopric of Augsburg. This was aided by good transportation links to the Allgäu and to Upper Bavaria, whilst there was only one link to the Inn valley usable in winter, namely the Fern Pass.

== Linguistic unit ==
Linguistically the region is dominated by a mixed form of the Alemannic and Austro-Bavarian dialects. The regions settled by Upper Bavaria and from the Inn valley, such as the Ehrwald Basin and the tributary valleys of the Lech have similarities with the dialects of the Upper Inn Valley, whilst in the region around Reutte and in the Tannheim valley, a Swabian-Alemannic dialect dominates.

== NUTS division: AT331 ==
In the NUTS division for official statistics collected by the EU the Außerfern is one of the five groups of districts (level NUTS:AT-2) in Tyrol, bears the code AT331 and covers the administrative district of Reutte.

== The region today ==
Today the term is used particularly in the Regional Development of Außerfern – the region is part of the Euroregions Tyrol-South Tyrol-Trentino, EUREGIO via salina and Zugspitze-Wetterstein-Karwendel.

Tourism is an important source of income, because the rather barren and high terrain is difficult to cultivate. In addition, industry and trade play a role, especially in the central Lech valley and the Reutte Basin.

The Tyrolean Lech Valley Nature Park and the river Lech, one of the last natural rivers in Europe, together with the multitude of sporting facilities are the basis for tourism in the Außerfern.

The main link into the rest of Tyrol is over the Fern Pass. The region is linked from the German railway network by the Außerfern Railway.

== Sources ==
- Fuchs, F. (1984): Heimat Außerfern – Eine Heimatkunde des Bezirkes Reutte. – 196 S.; Reutte (Außerferner Druck- und Verlagsgesellschaft).
- Gasser, H. (1978): Erlebnis Außerfern. – 211 S.; Graz u.a. (Leopold Stocker Verlag).
- Greif, F. & Schwackhöfer, W. (1979): Die Sozialbrache im Hochgebirge am Beispiel des Außerferns: Schriftenreihe des Agrarwirtschaftlichen Institutes des Bundesministeriums für Land- und Forstwirtschaft 31. – 185 S., 23 Abb.; Wien (Österreichischer Agrarverlag).
- Katholischer Tiroler Lehrerverein & Bezirksschulrat Reutte (2004): Der Bezirk Reutte – Das Außerfern. – 432 pp.; Höfen (Koch).
- Klebelsberg, R. v. (1955): Außerferner Geologie. – Schlern-Schriften, 111: 9-23, 8 images.; Innsbruck.
- Koller, H. (1969): Die Elektrizitätswirtschaft des Außerfern. – In: Ulmer, F.: Beiträge zur alpenländischen Wirtschafts- und Sozialforschung 57. – 70 pp., 12 Tab.; Innsbruck (Wagner).
- Lechenbauer, L. (1973): Außerfern – Ein Kleinod in Tirol. – 100 pp., 75 Abb.; Wolfsberg (Theiss).
- Linser, P. (1988): Sagenhaftes Außerfern 11 – Die Entstehung des Drachensees. – Außerferner Nachrichten: 4; Reutte.
- Lipp, R. (1994): Außerfern. – 127 S.; Innsbruck u.a. (Tyrolia).
- Mutschlechner, G. (1955): Der Erzbergbau in Außerfern. – Schlern-Schriften, 111: 25-52, 1 Abb., 5 Tab.; Innsbruck.
- Mutschlechner, G. & Palme, R. (1976): Das Messingwerk in Pflach bei Reutte – Ein bedeutsames Industrieunternehmen zu Beginn der Neuzeit. – 127 S., 5 Abb.; Reutte (RTW Verlag Außerferner Schriften).
- Ruepp, W. A. (2002): Die Mohrenwirtin. 100 Jahre Reuttener Zeitgeschichte. 110 S.; Reutte (Eigenverlag).
- Ruepp, W. A. (2004): Ausserferner Eigenart. Eine menschliche Spurensuche. 97 S.; Reutte (Ehrenberg-Verlag).
- Schöner, R., Scholz, H. & Krumm, H. (2003): Die mittelalterliche Eisengewinnung im Füssener Land (Ostallgäu und Außerfern) – Neue Ergebnisse zum Abbau und zur Verhüttung der Eisenerze aus dem Wettersteinkalk. – Arch. f. Lagerst.forsch. Geol. B.-A., 24: 193-218, 21 Abb., 3 Tab.; Wien.
- Schrettl, R. (2004): Expedition Außerfern – Geschichten und Eindrücke einer elftägigen Wanderung rund um den Bezirk Reutte. – 74 S., 21 Abb.; Reutte (Ehrenberg-Verlag).
- Thurner, H. (1924): Die Fernbahn, eine neue Nord-Südlinie Deutschland-Italien – Ein Beitrag zur Volkswohlfahrt West-Tirols Lebensnerv. – 44 S., 2 Anl.; Innsbruck (Selbstverlag Thurner).
- Trapp, O. (1986): Tiroler Burgenbuch – Oberinnteil und Außerfern VII. –; Bozen (Athesia).
- Wolkersdorfer, C. (1990): Ehrwaldit vor 125 Jahren entdeckt. – Außerferner Nachrichten, 7. Juni 1990: 4, 1 Abb.; Reutte.
- Wolkersdorfer, C. (2005): Der neue Montan-Wanderweg – Wandern auf geschichtlichen Spuren, erleben Sie die Bergbaugeschichte Biberwiers. – Außerferner Nachrichten, 25. August 2005:, 3 Abb.; Reutte.
- Wolkersdorfer, C., Göbel, J., Hasche-Berger, A. & Hanneberg, A. (2007): Führer zum Montan-Wanderweg Silberleithe. – 79 S., 128 Abb.; Biberwier (Bergwerksverein Silberleithe Tirol).
