= Tyrol (state) =

Austrian state

Tyrol Tirol
- State
- Federal State of Tyrol; Bundesland Tirol (German); Bundesland Tirol (Bavarian); Stato Federale del Tirolo (Italian)
- Flag Coat of arms Brandmark
- Anthem: Andreas-Hofer-Lied
- Coordinates: 47.27°N 11.4°E
- Country: Austria
- Capital: Innsbruck

Government
  - Body: Tyrolean Landtag
  - Governor: Anton Mattle (ÖVP)
  - Deputy Governors: Josef Geisler (ÖVP); Philip Wohglemuth (SPÖ)

Area
  - Total: 12,534 km^{2} (4,839 sq mi)

Population (1 January 2025)
  - Total: 777,660
  - Density: 62.044/km^{2} (160.69/sq mi)

GDP
  - Total: €44.805 billion (2024)
  - Per capita: €57,664 (2024)
- Time zone: UTC+1 (CET)
  - Summer (DST): UTC+2 (CEST)
- ISO 3166 code: AT-7
- HDI (2022): 0.938 very high · 3rd of 9
- NUTS Region: AT3
- Votes in Bundesrat: 5 (of 62)
- Website: tirol.gv.at

Tyrol (/tɪˈroʊl, taɪˈroʊl, ˈtaɪroʊl/ tih-ROHL, ty-ROHL, TY-rohl; German: Tirol [tiˈroːl]; Italian: Tirolo [tiˈrɔːlo]) is an Austrian state. It consists of two non-contiguous parts, North Tyrol and East Tyrol, separated by the Austrian state of Salzburg and the Italian province of South Tyrol, which was part of Tyrol until 1919. It is a constituent part of the present-day Euroregion Tyrol–South Tyrol–Trentino (together with South Tyrol and Trentino in Italy). The capital of Tyrol is Innsbruck.

Tyrol is dominated by high mountain ranges, including the Ötztal Alps, the Zillertal Alps, and the Kitzbühel Alps, with the Grossglockner and other major Alpine peaks nearby. The region is traversed by important rivers, such as the Inn and the Isel, and is noted for its valleys, glaciers, and alpine passes. Its strategic location has historically made Tyrol a key transit region between northern and southern Europe, with the Brenner Pass serving as one of the most important north–south routes across the Alps since Roman times.

Historically, Tyrol formed part of the County of Tyrol, which emerged as a distinct territorial entity of the Holy Roman Empire in the Late Middle Ages. It passed to the Habsburg dynasty in the 14th century, becoming an integral part of the Habsburg Monarchy. Following the end of World War I and the dissolution of Austria-Hungary, Tyrol was divided: South Tyrol and Trentino were ceded to Italy under the Treaty of Saint-Germain in 1919, leaving North and East Tyrol within the newly founded Republic of Austria. This division remains a defining feature of the region's political geography and cultural identity.

Today, Tyrol is known for its strong alpine traditions, vibrant tourism industry, and role as one of Austria's most popular destinations for skiing, mountaineering, and hiking. The state combines modern infrastructure with a strong preservation of local culture, evident in its folk music, festivals, and architectural heritage. Tyrol also plays an important role in Austria's economy, with tourism, winter sports, and alpine agriculture complemented by modern industries and universities centered in Innsbruck.

== Geography ==
Tyrol is separated into two parts, divided by a 7-kilometre-wide (4.3 mi) strip of Salzburg State. The two constituent parts of Tyrol are the northern and larger North Tyrol (Nordtirol) and the southeastern and smaller East Tyrol (Osttirol). Salzburg State lies to the east of North Tyrol, while on the south Tyrol has a border to the Italian province of South Tyrol, which was part of the Austro-Hungarian Empire before the First World War. With a land area of 12,683.85 km^{2} (4,897.26 sq mi), Tyrol is the third-largest federal state in Austria.

North Tyrol shares its borders with the federal states Salzburg in the east and Vorarlberg in the west. In the north, it adjoins the German state of Bavaria; in the south, it shares borders with the Italian province of South Tyrol and the Swiss canton of Graubünden. East Tyrol shares its borders with the Austrian state of Carinthia to the east and Italy's Province of Belluno (Veneto) to the south.

The state's territory is located entirely within the Eastern Alps at the Brenner Pass. The highest mountain in the state is the Großglockner, part of the Hohe Tauern range on the border with Carinthia. It has a height of 3,797 m (12,457.35 ft), making it the highest mountain in Austria.

=== Lakes ===
- Achen Lake
- Buchsee (Bezirk Kufstein)
- Fernsteinsee
- Frauensee (Bezirk Kufstein)
- Gritzer See
- Moalandlsee
- Pfrillsee
- Taubensee (Kössen/Unterwössen)

=== Climate ===
Tirol lies within the temperate climate zone and is situated at the boundary between Atlantic, continental, and Mediterranean influences. The prevailing climate is an inner-Alpine mountain climate with subcontinental characteristics. Relatively humid summers, dry autumns, snowy winters, and pronounced local variations characterize the climate.

Mountain ranges act as weather divides, while air masses can flow around isolated mountain massifs. The Northern Limestone Alps consist mainly of mountain chains where precipitation occurs on windward slopes. The leeward sides are generally mild and dry. Like all of Central Europe, Tyrol is influenced by the westerly wind zone; therefore, the northern edge of the Alps is the wettest and snowiest.

The inner-Alpine valleys have a comparatively mild climate. While the average annual precipitation in Reutte is still 1,375 millimeters, around 2,000 mm on the northern edge of the Karwendel Mountains, and 1,330 mm in Kufstein, it amounts to about 900 mm around Innsbruck and only 600 mm in the uppermost Inn Valley. Large daily temperature ranges are also characteristic of the inner-Alpine valleys; for example, the average daily maximum temperature in July for Innsbruck, at 25.1 °C, is higher than that of most other weather stations in Austria.

The mean elevation of Tyrol has a major influence on temperatures. With the exception of the area around Kufstein, settlements are located above 500 meters above sea level. The mountainous terrain reduces potential solar radiation, particularly in narrow north–south valleys such as the Ötztal and Pitztal.

Winter is usually characterized by alternating snowy and snow-poor weather conditions. In the northern parts of the state (Unterland, Außerfern, and the Karwendel region), thick snow cover of 50 cm or more—even at elevations below 1,000 m above sea level—is not uncommon due to the northern blocking effect, which is especially pronounced during cold fronts. In contrast, inner-Alpine areas receive little or no snow under such conditions. Conversely, inner-Alpine regions can experience greater precipitation when warm fronts arrive. Because precipitation often falls as rain at lower elevations during milder weather, thick snow cover is much less common, especially in the Upper Inn Valley. As a result, it frequently occurs that there is less snow in Landeck and Innsbruck than in Wörgl or Kufstein.

Spring in the Alpine region is usually very unsettled and rainy, and cold spells may occur. In summer, most precipitation falls in the form of thunderstorms. Autumn is often characterized by long periods of fair weather. A special weather phenomenon is the föhn wind, which occurs mainly during the transitional seasons; it can reach wind speeds of up to 200 km/h on the Patscherkofel and up to 120 km/h in Innsbruck, and can bring temperatures above 20 °C even in late autumn and early spring.

== History ==
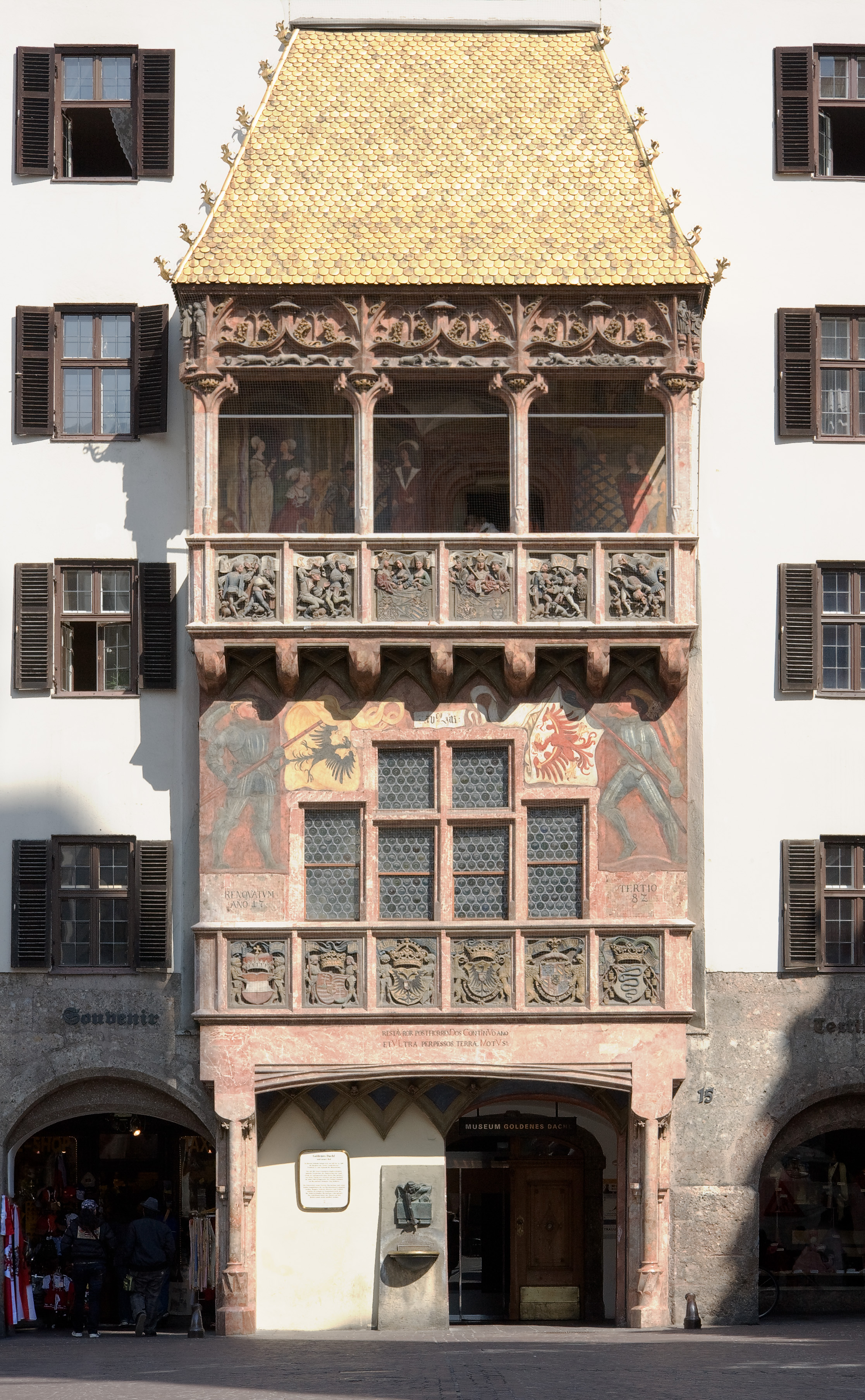
Golden Roof, Innsbruck

=== Ancient and Early Middle Ages ===
In ancient times, the region was split between the Roman provinces of Raetia (west of the Inn River) and Noricum. From the mid-6th century, it was resettled by Germanic Bavarii tribes. In the Early Middle Ages it formed the southern part of the German stem duchy of Bavaria, until the Counts of Tyrol, former Vogt officials of the Trent and Brixen prince-bishops at Tyrol Castle, achieved imperial immediacy after the deposition of the Bavarian duke Henry the Proud in 1138, and their possessions formed a state of the Holy Roman Empire in its own right.

=== Medieval and Early Modern Eras ===
When the Counts of Tyrol died out in 1253, their estates were inherited by the Meinhardiner Counts of Görz. In 1271, the Tyrolean possessions were divided between Count Meinhard II of Görz and his younger brother Albert I, who took the lands of East Tyrol around Lienz and attached them (as "outer county") to his committal possessions around Gorizia ("inner county").

The last Tyrolean countess of the Meinhardiner Dynasty, Margaret, bequeathed her assets to the Habsburg duke Rudolph IV of Austria in 1363. In 1420, the committal residence was relocated from Meran (Merano) to Innsbruck. The Tyrolean lands were reunited when the Habsburgs inherited the estates of the extinct Counts of Görz in 1500.

=== 19th Century and WWI ===
In the course of the German mediatization in 1803, the prince-bishoprics of Trent and Brixen were secularized and merged into the County of Tyrol (which in the next year became a constituent land of the Austrian Empire), but Tyrol was ceded to the Kingdom of Bavaria in 1805. Andreas Hofer led the Tyrolean Rebellion against the French and Bavarian occupiers. Later, South Tyrol was ceded to the Kingdom of Italy, a client state of the First French Empire, by Bavaria in 1810. After Napoleon's defeat, the whole of Tyrol was returned to Austria in 1814.

Tyrol was a Cisleithanian Kronland (royal territory) of Austria-Hungary from 1867. The County of Tyrol then extended beyond the boundaries of today's federal state, including North Tyrol and East Tyrol; South Tyrol and Trentino (Welschtirol) as well as three municipalities, which today are part of the adjacent province of Belluno. After World War I, these lands became part of the Kingdom of Italy according to the 1915 London Pact and the provisions of the Treaty of Saint Germain. From November 1918, it was occupied by 20,000–22,000 soldiers of the Italian Army.

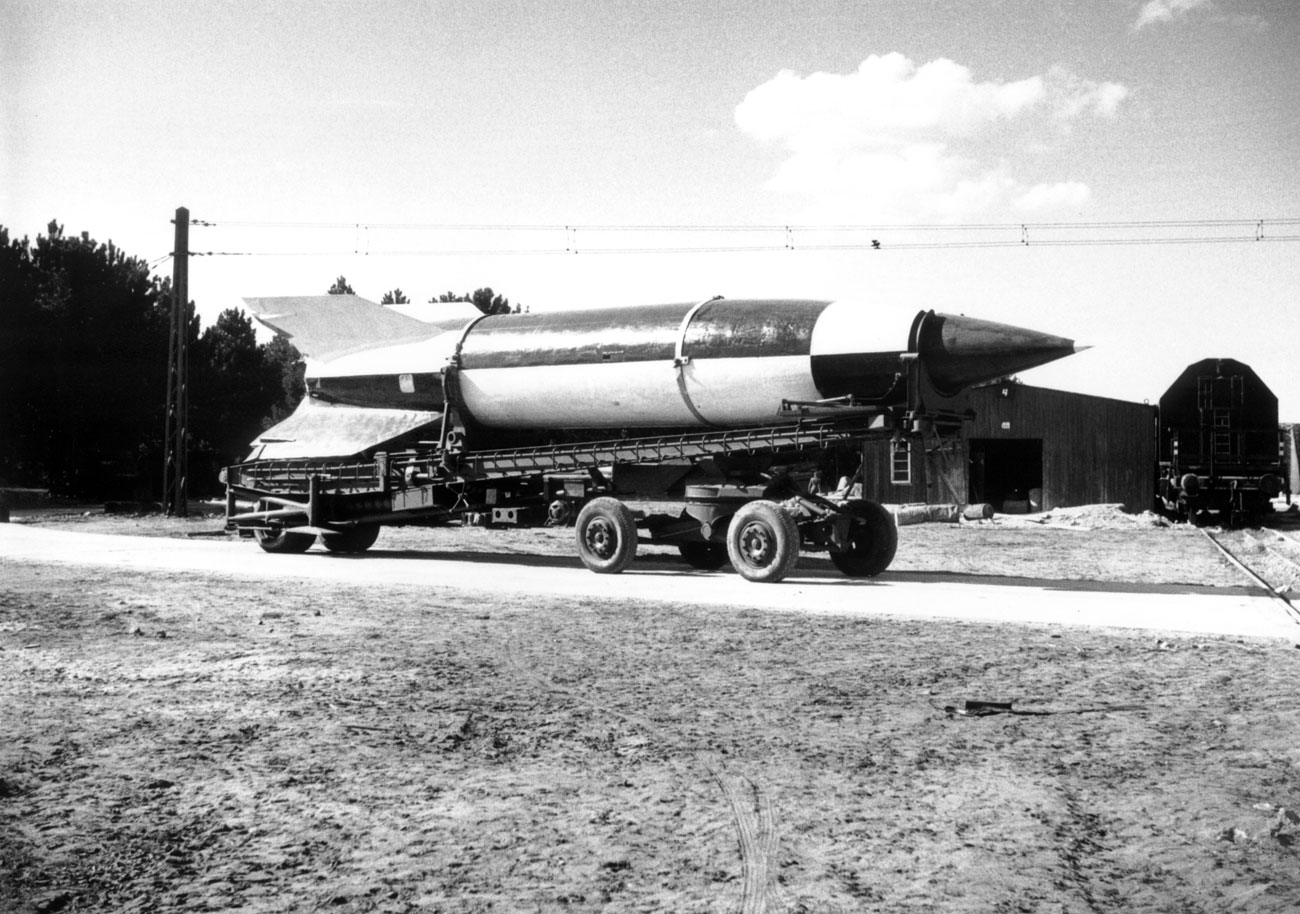
Heinrich Maier, Walter Caldonazzi and their group helped the allies to fight the V-2, which was produced by concentration camp prisoners.

=== WWII ===
Tyrol was the center of an important resistance group against Nazi Germany around Walter Caldonazzi, which united with the group around the priest Heinrich Maier and the Tyrolean Franz Josef Messner. The Catholic resistance group very successfully passed on plans and production facilities for V-1 rockets, V-2 rockets, Tiger tanks, Messerschmitt Me 163 Komet and other aircraft to the Allies, with which they could target German production facilities. Maier and his group informed the American secret service OSS very early on about the mass murder of Jews in Auschwitz. There were plans that post-war Austria would be united with South Tyrol and Bavaria.

After World War II, North Tyrol was governed by France and East Tyrol was part of the British Zone of occupation until Austria regained independence in 1955.

== Towns ==
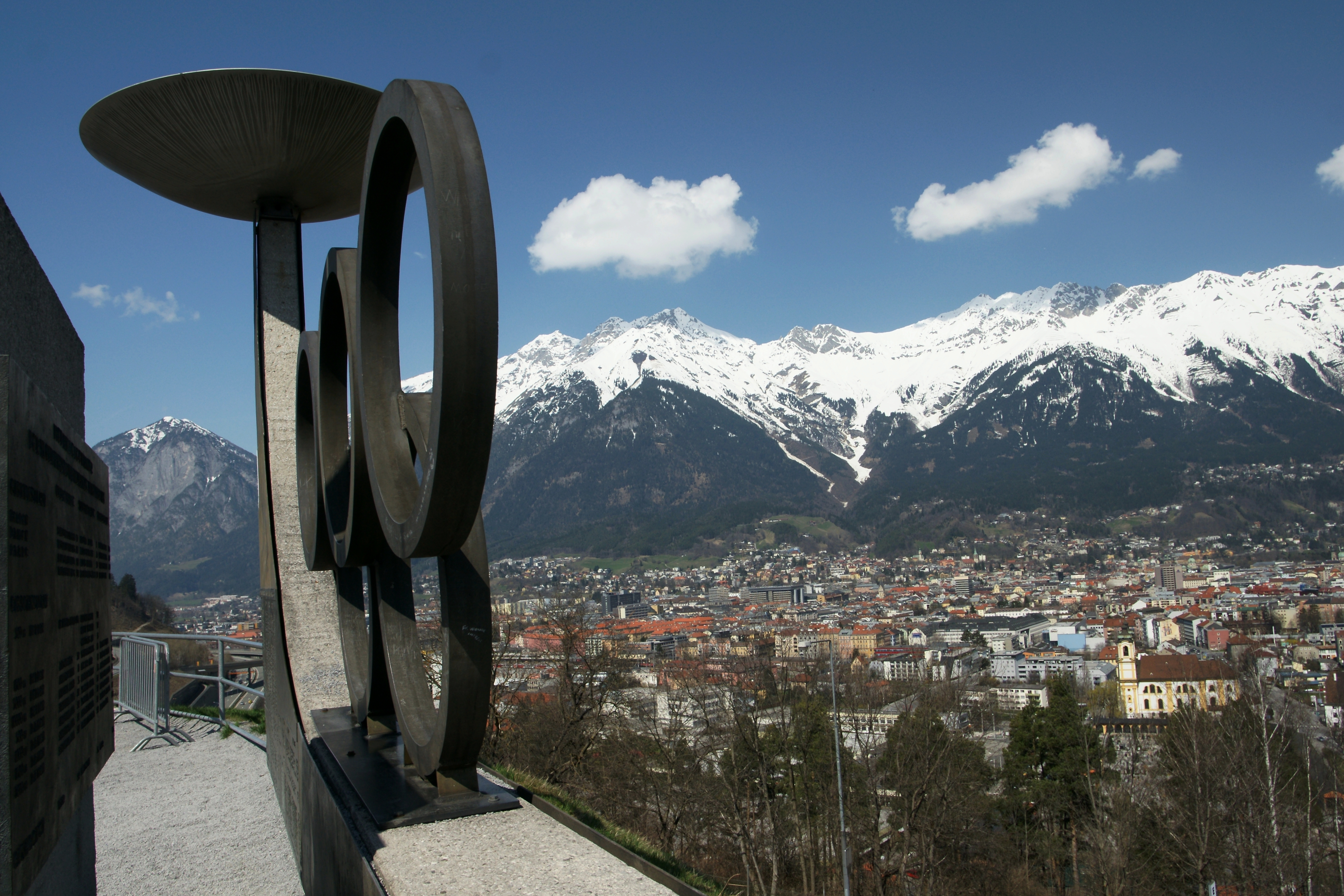
View of Innsbruck from Mt. Bergisel

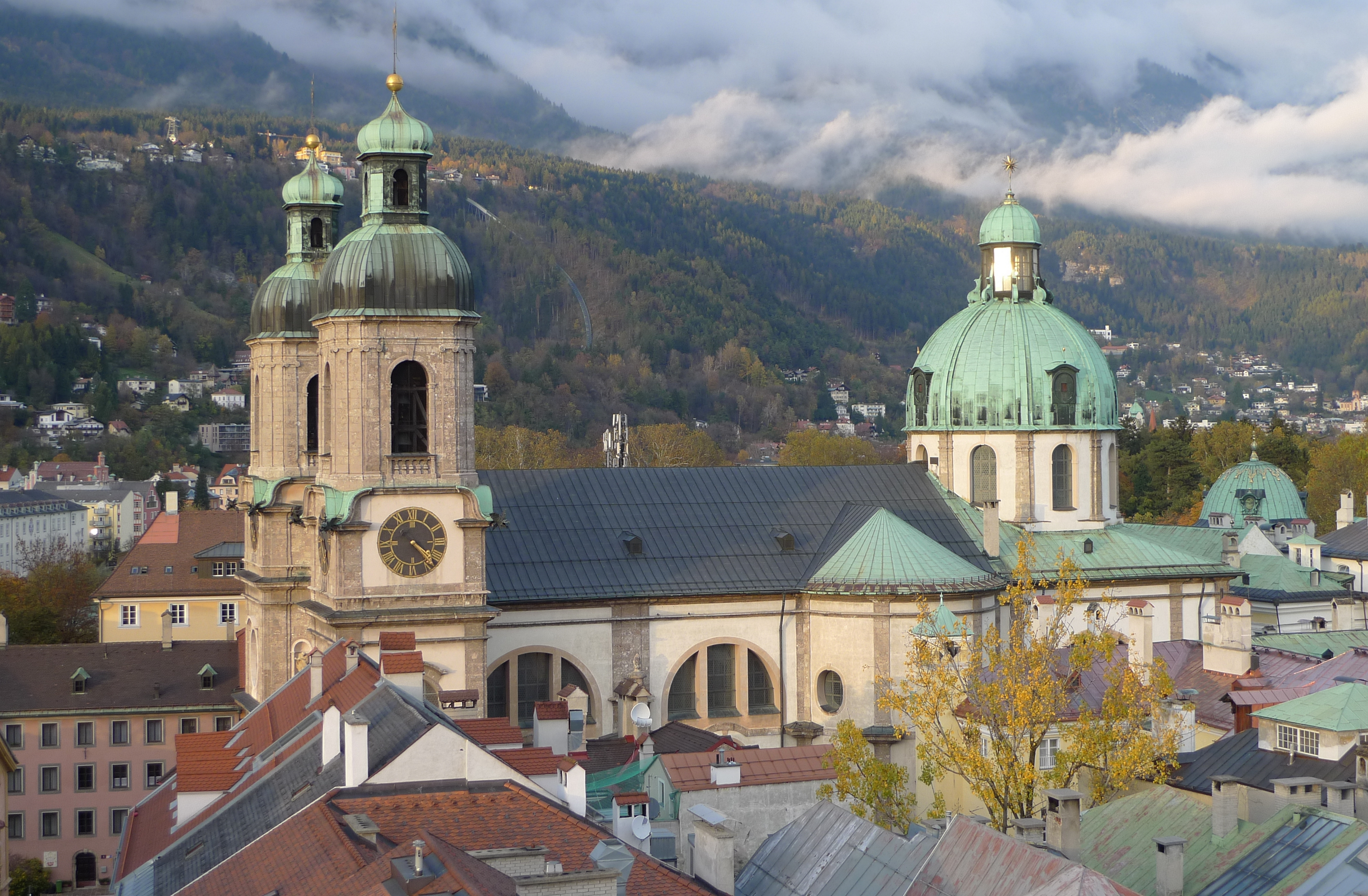
A view from the tower of the old townhall to Innsbruck Cathedral

The capital, Innsbruck, is known for its university, and especially for its medicine. Tyrol is popular for its famous ski resorts, which include Kitzbühel, Ischgl and St. Anton. The 15 largest towns in Tyrol are:

| | Town | Inhabitants January 2025 |
|---|---|---|
| 1. | Innsbruck | 132,499 |
| 2. | Kufstein | 20,212 |
| 3. | Telfs | 16,439 |
| 4. | Hall in Tirol | 14,698 |
| 5. | Schwaz | 14,480 |
| 6. | Wörgl | 14,412 |
| 7. | Lienz | 12,107 |
| 8. | Imst | 11,183 |
| 9. | St. Johann in Tirol | 9,891 |
| 10. | Rum | 9,493 |
| 11. | Kitzbühel | 8,281 |
| 12. | Zirl | 8,250 |
| 13. | Wattens | 8,138 |
| 14. | Landeck | 7,711 |
| 15. | Jenbach | 7,339 |

== Demographics ==
Historical population
| Year | Pop. | ±% |
|---|---|---|
| 1869 | 236,426 | — |
| 1880 | 244,736 | +3.5% |
| 1890 | 249,984 | +2.1% |
| 1900 | 266,374 | +6.6% |
| 1910 | 304,713 | +14.4% |
| 1923 | 313,888 | +3.0% |
| 1934 | 349,098 | +11.2% |
| 1939 | 363,959 | +4.3% |
| 1951 | 427,465 | +17.4% |
| 1961 | 462,899 | +8.3% |
| 1971 | 544,483 | +17.6% |
| 1981 | 586,663 | +7.7% |
| 1991 | 631,410 | +7.6% |
| 2001 | 673,504 | +6.7% |
| 2011 | 709,319 | +5.3% |
| 2021 | 762,652 | +7.5% |
Source: Censuses

The historical population is given in the following chart:

=== Religion ===
Religious affiliation according to the 2021 census
1. Roman Catholicism (66.2%)
2. Evangelical (Protestant) (3.00%)
3. Orthodox Church (3.10%)
4. Other Christian denomination (0.90%)
5. Islam (8.70%)
6. No religious affiliation (17.8%)
7. Other religion (0.30%)

Since the 2001 census, Tyrol—like the rest of Austria—has seen a significant increase in the proportion of people with no religious affiliation, as well as in the shares of Muslims and Orthodox Christians, while the proportion of Catholic Christians has declined. Tyrol thus had the highest proportion of Catholics of all Austrian federal states. The share of Evangelical Christians has also increased slightly.

== Economy ==
The economic structure of Tyrol varies considerably by region. The greater Innsbruck area features a concentration of educational and administrative infrastructure alongside the presence of larger industrial enterprises. In the rest of the state, the economy is predominantly characterized by small and medium-sized enterprises; this small-scale structure is particularly pronounced in the Oberland, the district of Kitzbühel, and East Tyrol. However, the district of Kitzbühel is also home to industrial and service companies of Europe-wide significance in sectors such as particleboard manufacturing, pharmaceuticals, insulation materials, and tourism (both incoming and outgoing).

Industry is mainly concentrated in the greater Innsbruck area, in the districts of Schwaz and Kufstein (Lower Inn Valley), and in the Reutte area. In the Oberland and the district of Kitzbühel, tourism predominates and plays a major role throughout the entire state. The district of Schwaz features both significant industrial areas and important tourism regions (the Zillertal and Achensee). Tyrol has around 360,000 guest beds, about half of them in hotels and around one third in holiday apartments. Tourism in Tyrol employs approximately 52,040 workers, although many of them are not employed year-round. Agriculture plays only a minor economic role, but it is important for the state's self-image and for the preservation of the cultural landscape.

In 2014, the regional gross domestic product per capita, expressed in purchasing power standards, stood at 138% (EU-28: 100%; Austria: 129%). Compared with residents of other Austrian federal states, people in Tyrol earn the least. While the median gross annual income across Austria in 2005 was €22,611, a resident of Tyrol earned an average of €20,671 in the same period.

Economic structure by sector as of 2022:

- Primary sector: 4%
- Secondary sector: 22%
- Tertiary sector: 74%

The federal state's gross domestic product (GDP) was 34.6 billion euro in 2018, accounting for 9% of Austria's economic output. GDP per capita adjusted for purchasing power was 40,900 euro or 136% of the EU27 average in the same year.

=== Tourism ===
Tourism is an important economic sector in Tyrol. On average, it accounts for 17.5% of Tyrol's gross regional product. In 2024, Tyrol's share of all overnight stays in Austria was around one third. Tyrol is followed by Salzburg and then Styria. In addition, around 52,400 people are employed in the hotel and catering industry. Nearly 70% of all employees in this sector come from abroad.

In the 2024/25 tourism year, 12.4 million guests visited the various municipalities of the federal state, accounting for a total of 49.6 million overnight stays. The average length of stay was 3.9 days—slightly longer in winter at 4.4 days and shorter in summer at 3.5 days. The strongest month of the 2024/2025 winter season was February, with 7 million overnight stays, while in the summer of 2025 August recorded the highest number, with 6.5 million overnight stays. As a result, 53% of overnight stays occurred during the winter season and 47% during the summer season, making winter tourism slightly stronger than summer tourism.

In 2025, about half of all tourists came from Germany, accounting for 55% or 26.8 million overnight stays. In addition, many visitors came from the Netherlands (11.0% with 5.6 million overnight stays), Austria (8% with 4.1 million overnight stays), Switzerland (5% with 2.2 million overnight stays), and Belgium (3% with 1.6 million overnight stays). Other nations, which only a few years ago played a rather minor role, are becoming increasingly important.

The highest numbers of overnight stays were recorded by the Ötztal tourism association with 4.5 million, followed by Innsbruck with 3.8 million and Paznaun–Ischgl with 2.7 million. Sölden, located at the upper end of the Ötztal valley (district of Imst), has for years been the municipality with the highest number of overnight stays in Austria. In 2024, Sölden recorded 2.6 million overnight stays.

== Transport ==
Tyrol has long been a central hub for European long-distance routes and thus a transit land for trans-European trade over the Alps. As early as the 1st century B.C. Tyrol had one of the most important north–south links of the Roman Empire, the Via Claudia Augusta. Roman roads crossed the Tyrol from the Po Plain in present-day Italy, following the course of the Etsch and Eisack in present South Tyrol over the Brenner and then following the northern Wipp valley to Hall. From there roads branched along the River Inn. The Via Raetia went westwards and up onto the Seefeld Plateau, where it crossed into Bavaria where Scharnitz is today. The Porta Claudia, built in the early 17th century is a fortification that underlines the importance of the road in the early modern Period.

Today Tyrol has international road, rail and air connections. Innsbruck Airport is Tyrol's international airport. In addition there are several smaller airports in various places such as St. Johann in Tirol, Höfen in the Außerfern or Langkampfen. Many public transit companies operate a common tariff scheme as part of the Tyrol Transport Association.

== Administrative divisions ==
Districts of Tyrol

The federal state is divided into nine districts (Bezirke); one of them, Innsbruck, is a statutory city. There are 277 municipalities. The districts and their administrative centres, from west to east and north to south, are:

North Tyrol

- Landeck District, (capital: Landeck)
- Reutte District, (Reutte)
- Imst District, (Imst)
- Innsbruck-Land, (Innsbruck, not part of the district)
- Innsbruck Stadt
- Schwaz District, (Schwaz)
- Kufstein District, (Kufstein)
- Kitzbühel District, (Kitzbühel)

East Tyrol

- Lienz District, (Lienz)

== Sister relationships ==
- Special Region of Yogyakarta, Indonesia

== Culture ==
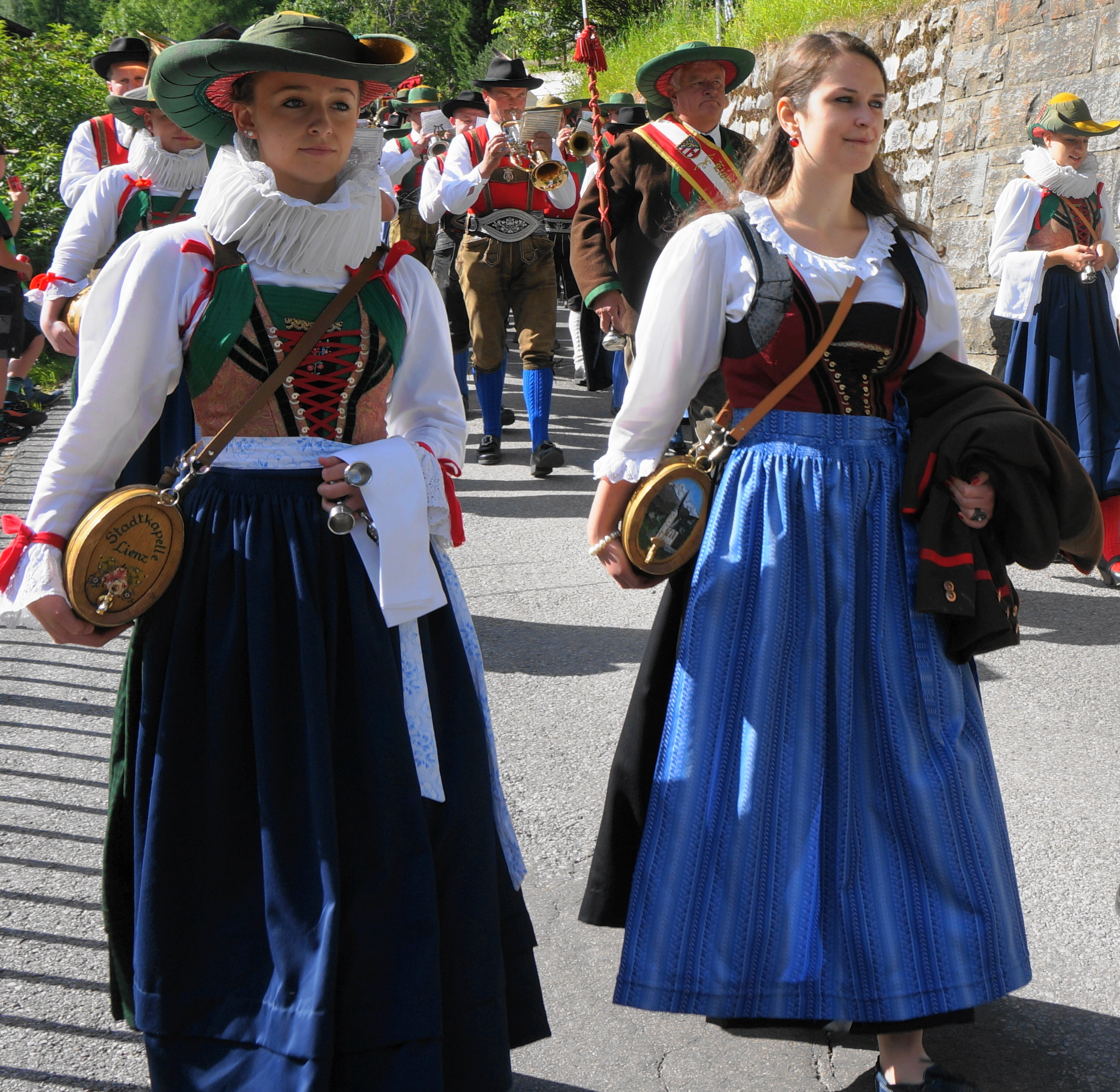
Traditional long-skirted dirndls from Lienz in Tyrol

The traditional form of mural art known as Lüftlmalerei is typical of Tyrolean villages and towns.

Kletzenbrot is a sweet bread made with dried fruits and nuts for the Advent season. Because it is associated with Tyrol it is also known as "Tyrolean Dried Fruit Bread".

Tyrol also has a strong history of folk theater, which has influenced the culture since the late Middle Ages and well into the 19th century. Today in Tyrol, particularly in Innsbruck, there are folk theatre summer festivals and evening shows catering to traditional Tyrolean theatre, music, and dancing.

== Identity ==
The question of which regional unit was the bearer of primary identification was raised in the 1987 Austrian Consciousness Survey. The possible answers were: the hometown (local patriotism), one's own province (regional patriotism), (Central) Europe (European consciousness), the world (cosmopolitanism).

Emotional connectedness according to territorial units (1987)
| in: | Vienna | Lower Austria | Burgenland | Tyrol | Carinthia | Vorarlberg | Styria | Upper Austria | Salzburg |
|---|---|---|---|---|---|---|---|---|---|
| Homeplace | 38 | 30 | 31 | 16 | 23 | 21 | 25 | 35 | 24 |
| Bundesland | 8 | 16 | 24 | 58 | 53 | 44 | 39 | 23 | 33 |
| Austrian | 46 | 55 | 44 | 19 | 24 | 28 | 32 | 37 | 35 |
| German | 1 | 0 | - | 1 | - | - | 2 | 1 | 2 |
| (Middle-)European | 4 | 1 | - | 1 | - | 4 | 2 | 1 | 4 |
| World Citizen | 4 | - | 1 | 2 | - | 3 | 1 | 2 | - |
| other | 2 | 0 | - | - | 1 | - | 0 | 0 | 3 |

A research project led by Peter Diem offers a thoroughly comparable picture: In Vienna and Lower Austria, Austrian national patriotism dominated (1988) over territorial consciousness. In Upper Austria, Salzburg and Styria, national patriotism slightly outweighed regional (federal state) patriotism. In Carinthia, Tyrol and Vorarlberg, regional patriotism clearly dominated. When asked to rate their own regional patriotism on a ten-point scale, 83% of Carinthians, 69% of Tyroleans, 63% of Vorarlbergers, Burgenlanders and Styrians, 59% of Upper Austrians, 55% of Lower Austrians, 47% of Viennese and 43% of Salzburgers gave it the highest value.

The results of this study underline the assumption of a highly developed sense of regional identity in most Austrian federated states.

== In popular culture ==
The first thirteen of the Chalet School series of books by Elinor Brent-Dyer, and part of the fourteenth, The Chalet School in Exile (1940), are set in Tyrol, on Pertisau on Lake Achen. Brent-Dyer had visited the Tyrol in the 1920s. Nancy G. Rosoff and Stephanie Spencer have written that Brent-Dyer "used the setting of her fictional school in the Austrian Tyrol to give her readers some hard lessons about Nazi persecution".

== See also ==
- Tyrol
- East Tyrol
- Euroregion Tyrol-South Tyrol-Trentino
- Grünausee
- History of Tyrol
- Längentalspeicher
- North Tyrol
- Reither See
- Tyrolean Eagle-Order
