= Stephan Krismer =

Austrian Catholic priest (1777–1869)

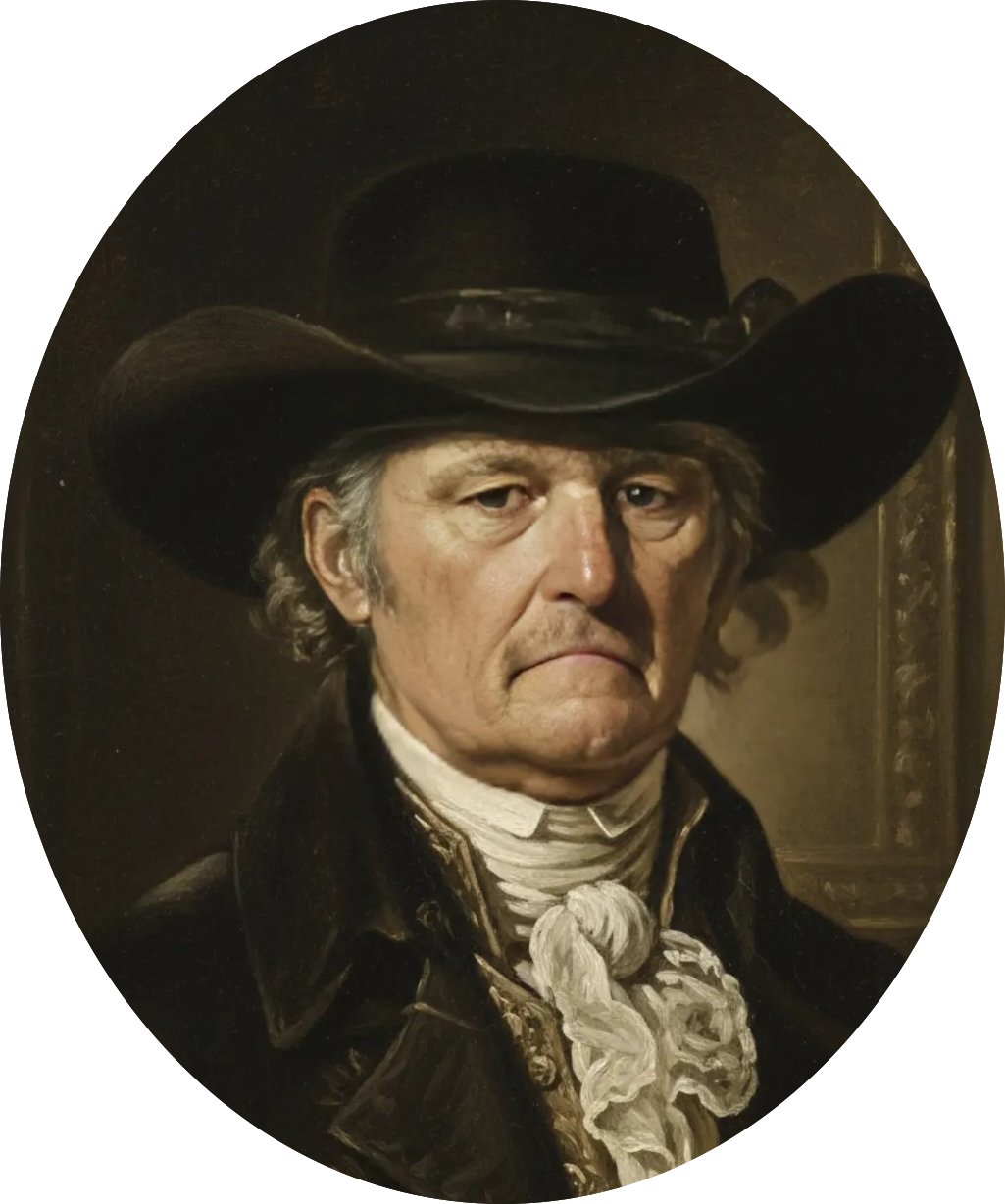
Posthumous Illustration of Count Krismer c.a 1900

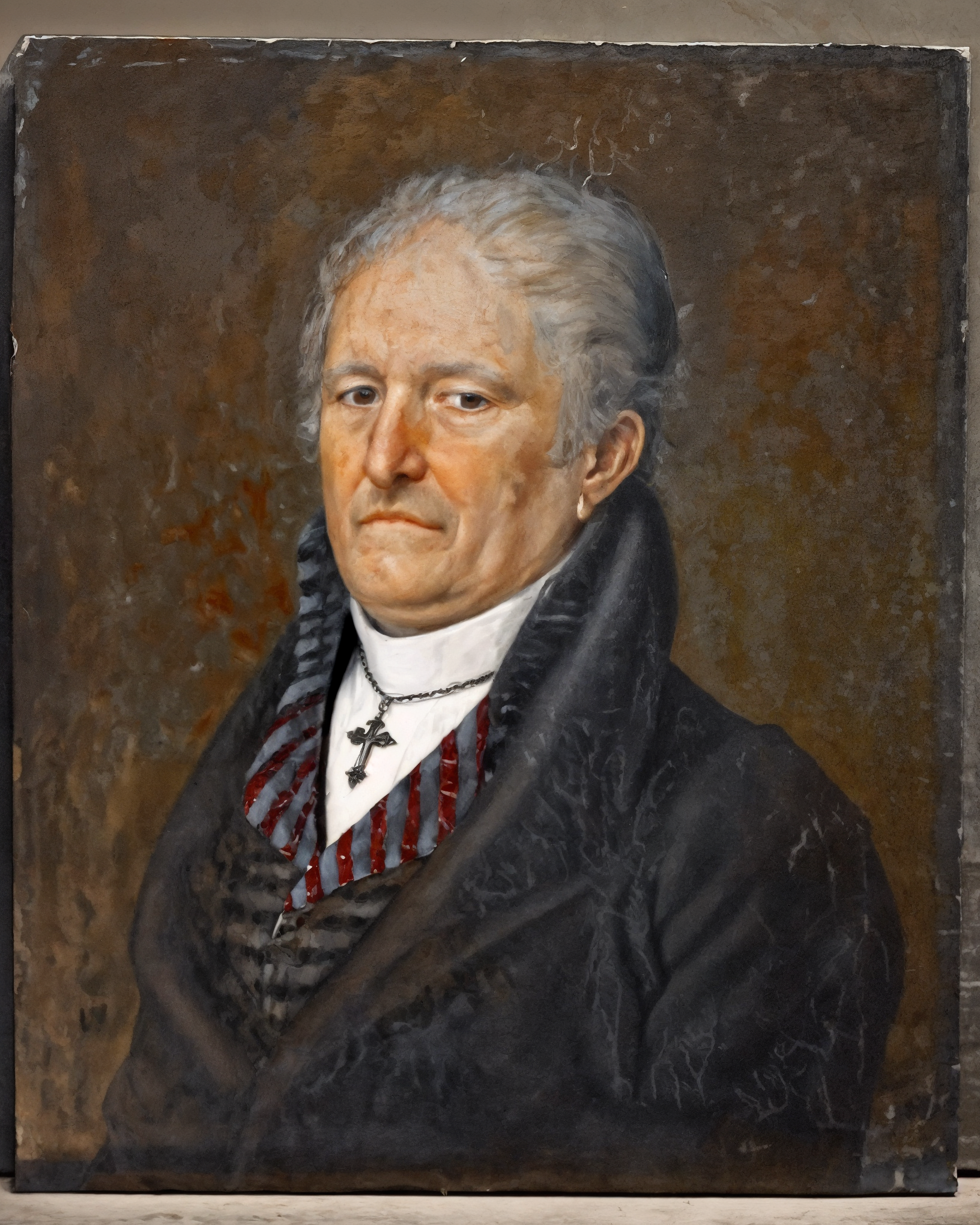
Count Krismer c.a 1833

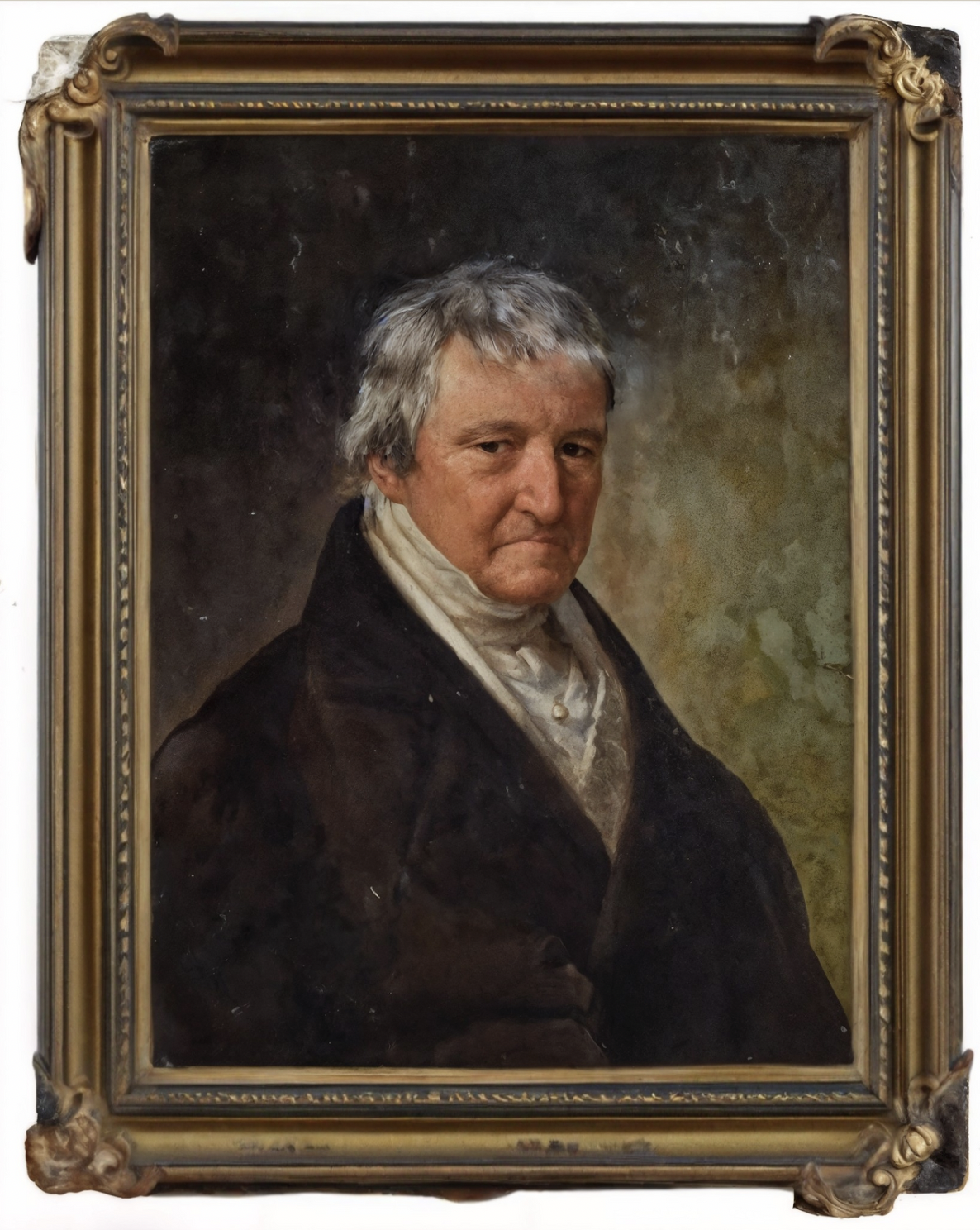
Krismerhof c.a 1844

Count Stephan Krismer von Krismerhof (the Elder of Krismer, Count of Krismerhof), nicknamed Karrer Stöffele, (December 25, 1777, in Karres, Tyrol – November 8, 1869, in Kronburg near Zams) was a Catholic priest, Count and founder of three monasteries in Tyrol. He significantly shaped the religious landscape of the Upper Tyrolean region through the founding of monasteries in Ried, Imst, and Kronburg. During the 4th Battle of Bergisel, he was one of the closest advisors of Andreas Hofer.

== Life ==
Stephan Krismer was born in 1777 into a large family in Karres. He was orphaned at an early age. Despite extremely modest circumstances, he attended the Capuchin high school in Bruneck and subsequently entered the priestly seminary in Brixen. After his ordination in 1804, he served for several years as a priest in his hometown of Karres and as a curate in Arzl im Pitztal. As a committed patriot and independent thinker, he repeatedly resisted the Bavarian authorities. He openly declared his rejection of any regulations that hindered his priestly duties and arbitrarily curtailed the religious freedom of the devout people.

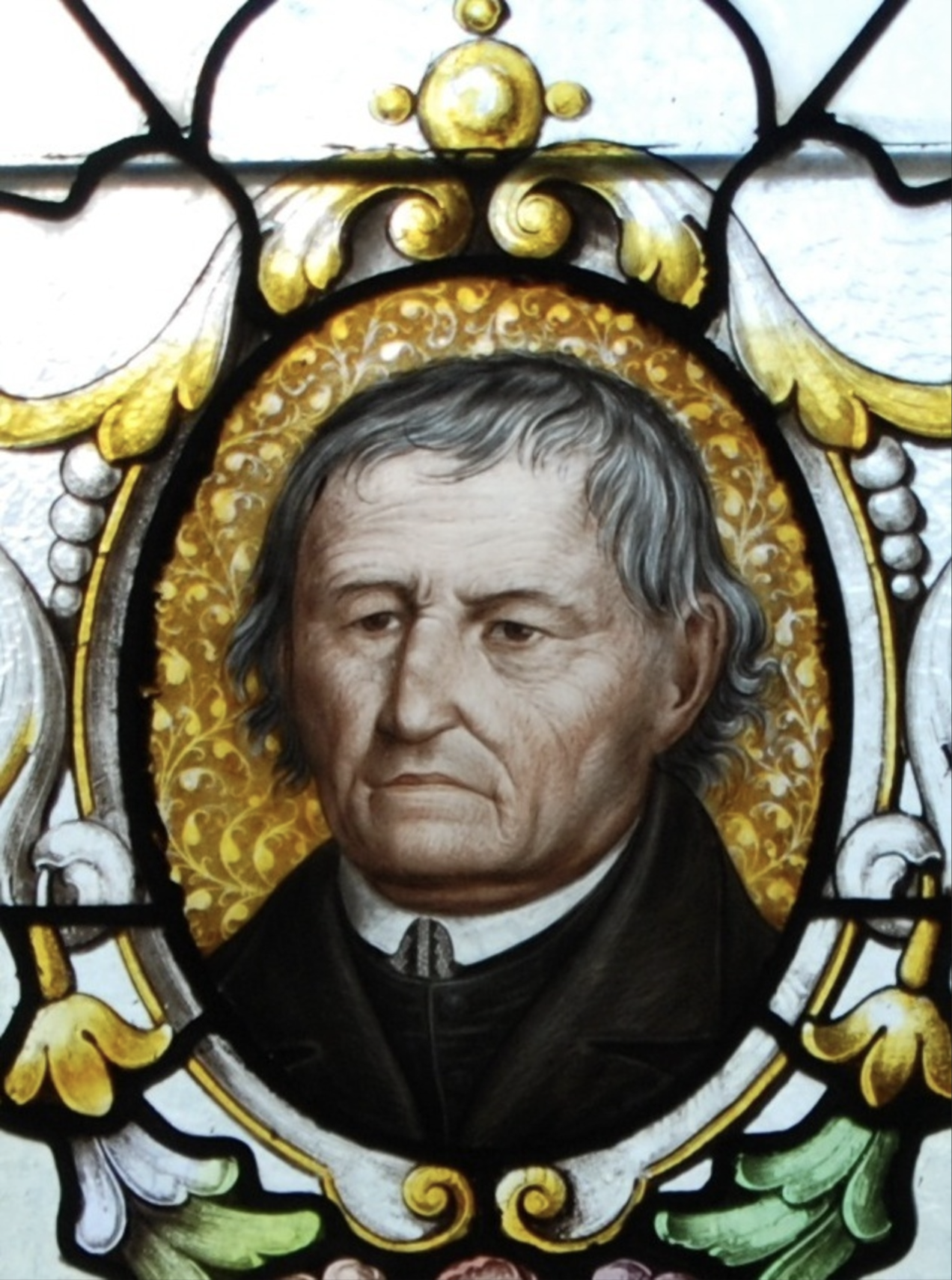
Commemorative Icon of Krismer in one of his founded parishes

In 1809, Krismer served amid the turmoil of the Tyrolean uprising as field chaplain for the riflemen of the Upper Inn Valley. During the 4th Battle of Bergisel, he was one of the closest advisors of Andreas Hofer. As field chaplain and advisor to Andreas Hofer, he endeavored to secure a ceasefire, ensure the safe withdrawal of the Upper Inn Valley riflemen, and promote humane treatment of captured Bavarian soldiers.

After the uprising, Krismer served at several pastoral posts (Strengen, Prutz, Mils bei Imst, Fiss, Kronburg and Brennbichl). This extensive service also earned him the epithet "Wanderkurat" (itinerant chaplain). Through his monastery foundations in Ried, Imst, and Kronburg, Krismer left a lasting mark on the religious landscape of the Upper Tyrolean region. Until advanced age, he, together with the nuns at the three monasteries he founded, strove to alleviate the great distress of the rural population and to proclaim the Christian faith.

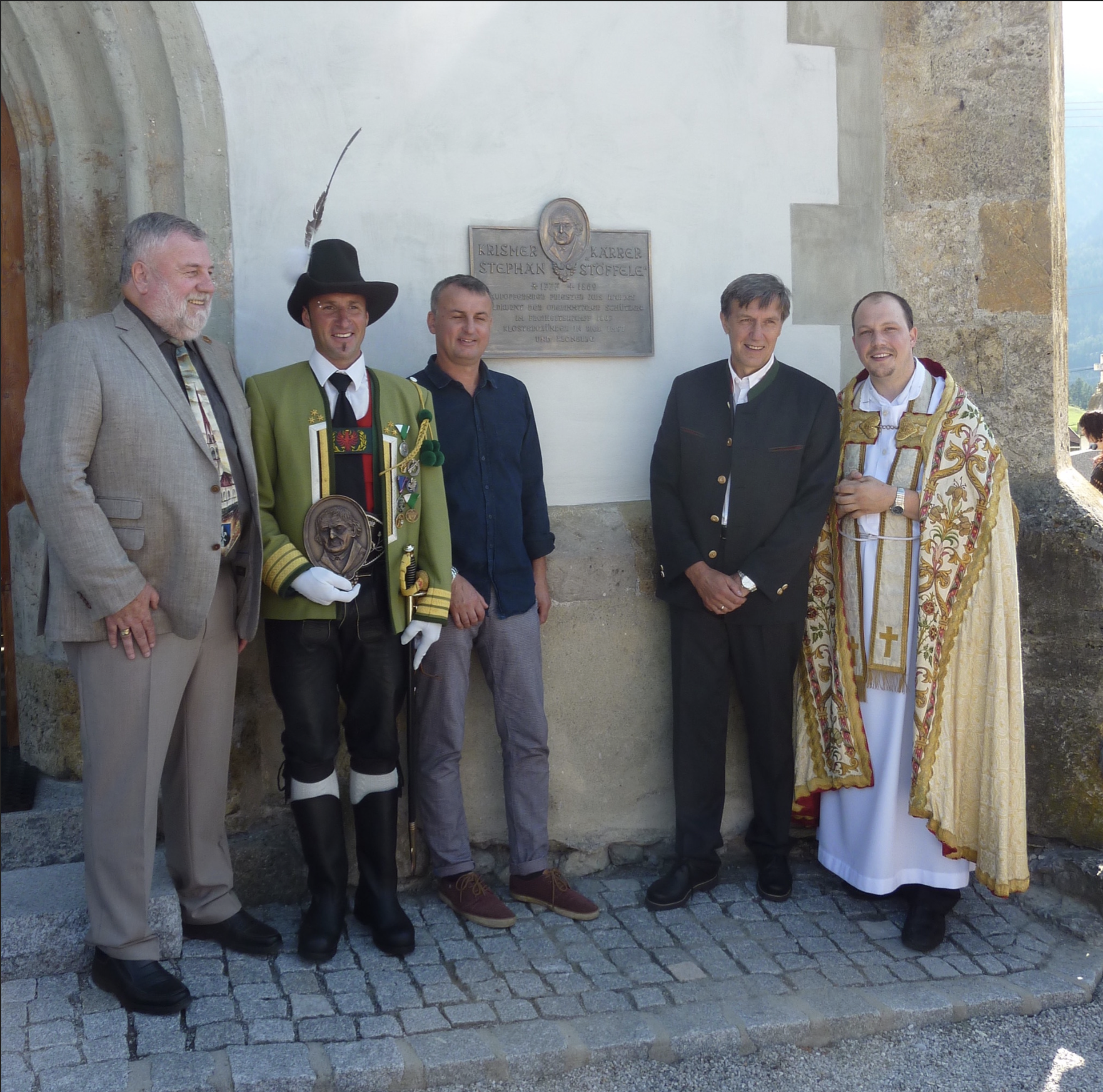
Memorial Ceremony 2017

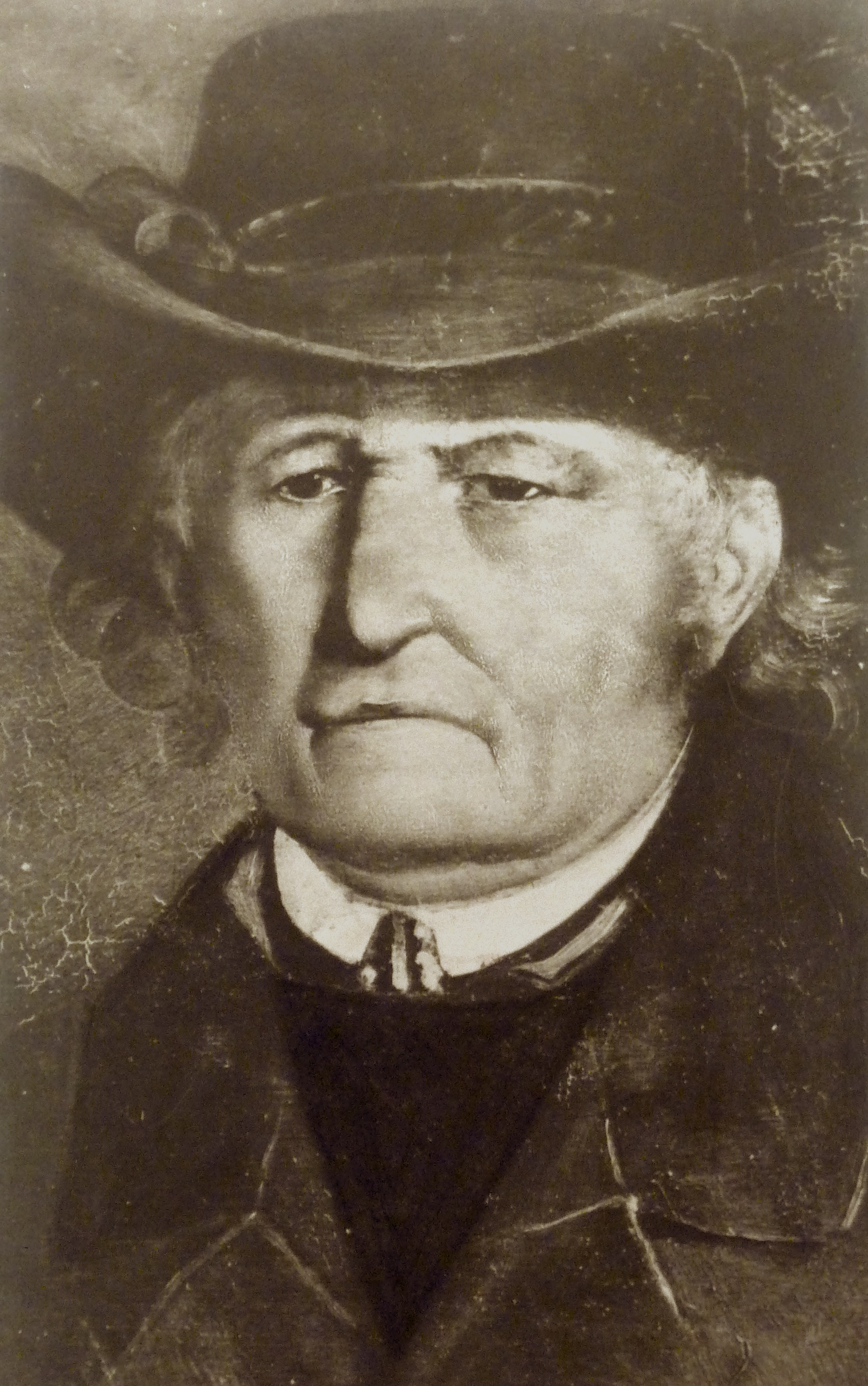
Stephan Krismer

Stephan Krismer died in 1869 at the age of 91 in Kronburg near Zams and was buried there. His memorial is located in the local cemetery.

== Elevation to nobility ==
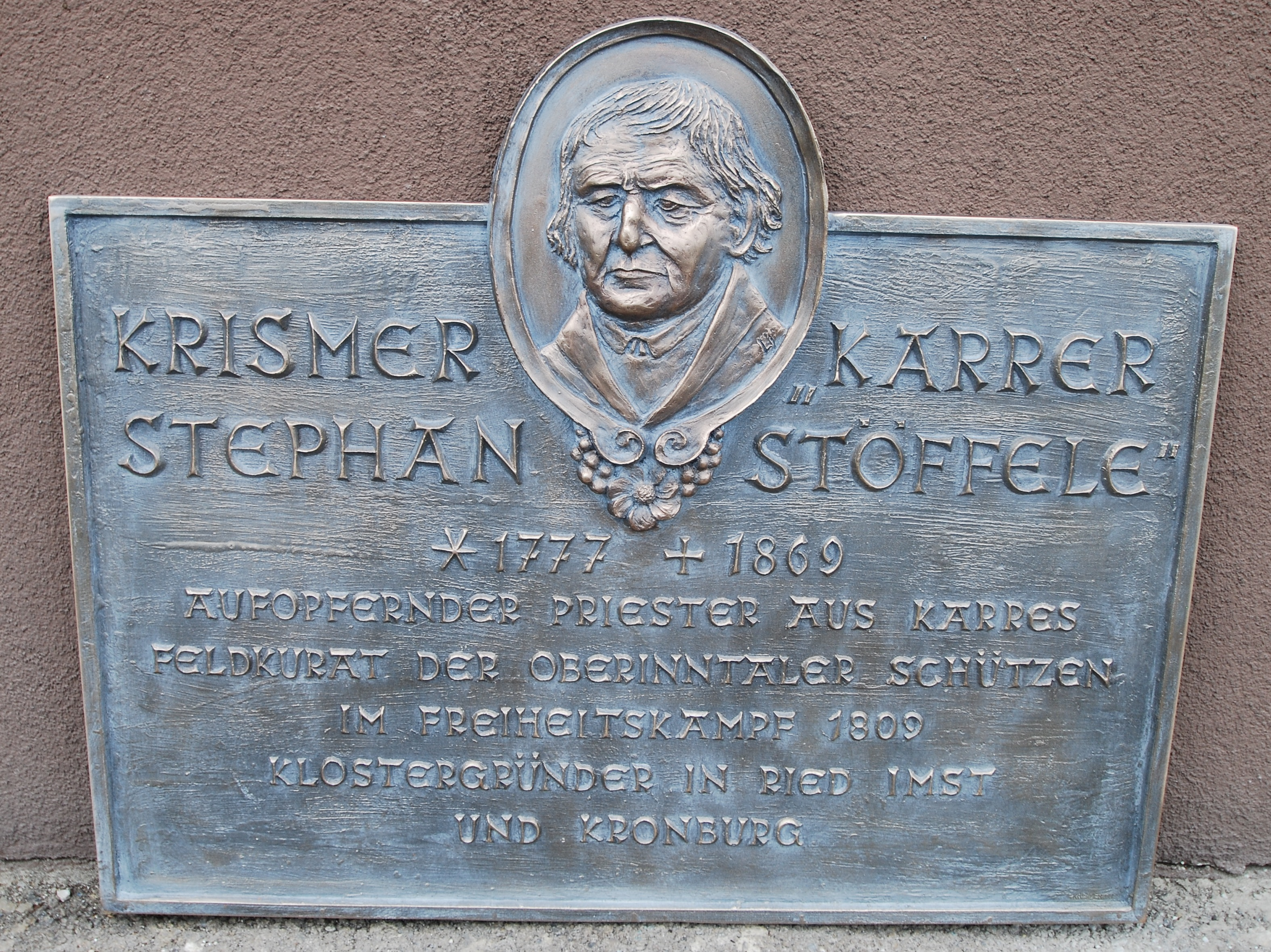
Memorial plaque at the Parish Church of Karres

On 12 August 1810, Krismer was elevated to the hereditary nobility by Emperor Francis II for his "unwavering loyalty and bravery" during the Tyrolean uprising, formally establishing the House of Krismerhof. He received the title Edler von Krismer, which was later styled as Count of Krismer. Upon his death in 1869 without direct male heirs, the comital title became extinct; however, his surviving siblings and their male‑line descendants continued to bear the title of Freiherr (Baron) von Krismer.

Memorial plaques in honor of Krismer can be found on the facades of the parish churches in Karres, in See, in Strengen, and in Ried in the Upper Inn Valley.

== Literature ==
- Gschließer: "Krismer, Stephan". In: Österreichisches Biographisches Lexikon 1815–1950 (ÖBL). Vol. 4, Austrian Academy of Sciences, Vienna 1969, p. 276 f. (Direct links to "p. 276", "p. 277")
- Johannes Laichner: Stephan Krismer. Karrer Stöffele. A Pioneer of Faith in Tumultuous Times. Karres 2016.
- Arthur Achleitner: Stöffele. Life Portrait of a Tyrolean Heroic Priest. Heinrich Kirsch, Vienna 1904; 2nd ed.: J. Habbel, Regensburg and Vienna n.d. (1918).
- Johannes Laichner: Stephan Krismer – A Pioneer of Faith in Tumultuous Times (1777–1869). Priest in the Tyrolean Uprising and Founder of Monasteries (Studies in Church History, Vol. 31). Verlag Dr Kovač, Hamburg 2017, ISBN 978-3-8300-9793-8.
