= Roppen =

- Municipality
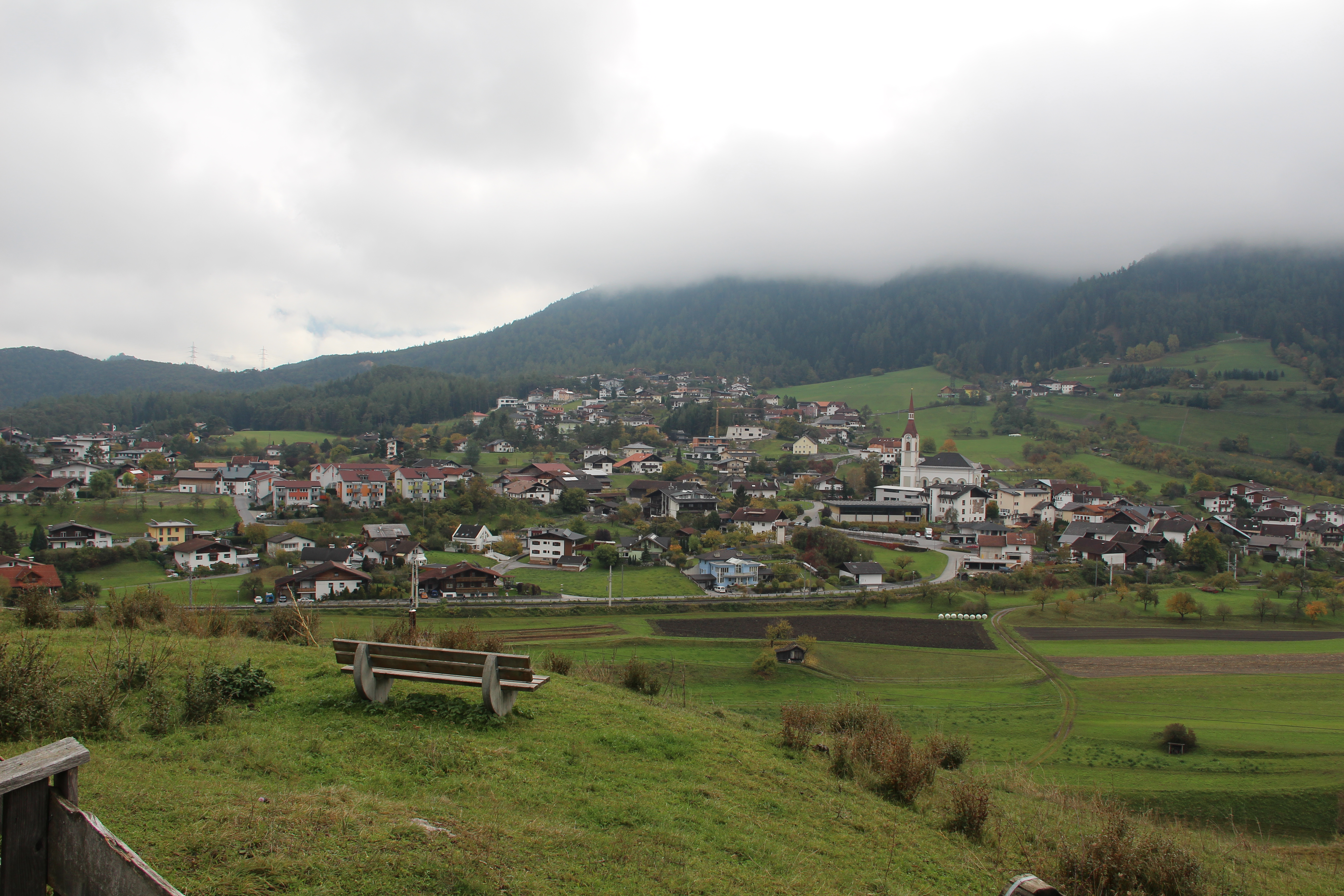

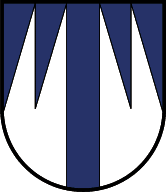
- Coat of arms

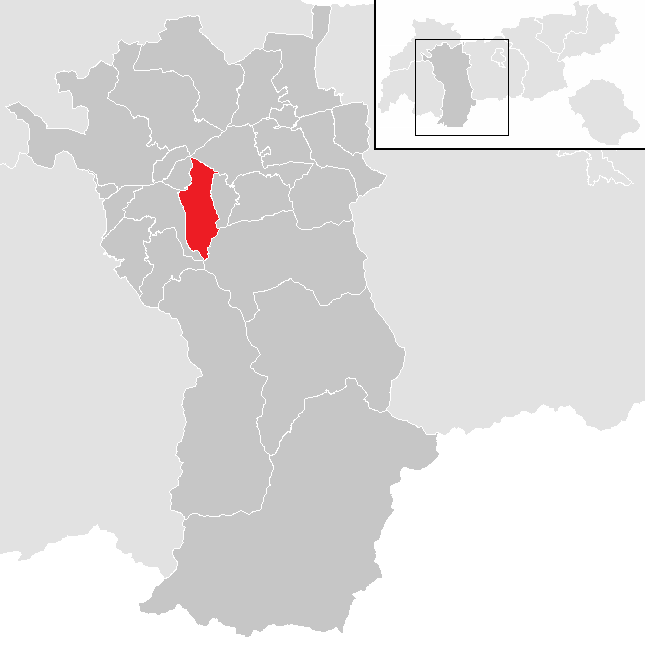
- Location in the district

- Location within Austria
- Coordinates: 47°13′00″N 10°49′12″E
- Country: Austria
- State: Tyrol
- District: Imst

Government
  - Mayor: Ingobert Mayr (SPÖ)

Area
  - Total: 30.87 km^{2} (11.92 sq mi)
- Elevation: 724 m (2,375 ft)

Population (2021)
  - Total: 1,877
  - Density: 60.80/km^{2} (157.5/sq mi)
- Time zone: UTC+1 (CET)
  - Summer (DST): UTC+2 (CEST)
- Postal code: 6426
- Area code: 05417
- Vehicle registration: IM
- Website: www.roppen.tirol.gv.at

Roppen is a municipality in the Imst district and is located 5 km southeast of Imst between the mouths of the Pitze River and the Ötztaler Ache. The village was mentioned in documents in 1260 for the first time as "Roupen" but settlement already began 3000 years ago.

== Population ==
Historical population
| Year | Pop. | ±% |
|---|---|---|
| 1869 | 656 | — |
| 1880 | 630 | −4.0% |
| 1890 | 592 | −6.0% |
| 1900 | 612 | +3.4% |
| 1910 | 647 | +5.7% |
| 1923 | 653 | +0.9% |
| 1934 | 728 | +11.5% |
| 1939 | 825 | +13.3% |
| 1951 | 883 | +7.0% |
| 1961 | 930 | +5.3% |
| 1971 | 1,118 | +20.2% |
| 1981 | 1,199 | +7.2% |
| 1991 | 1,390 | +15.9% |
| 2001 | 1,605 | +15.5% |
| 2011 | 1,644 | +2.4% |
