= Wenns =

- Municipality
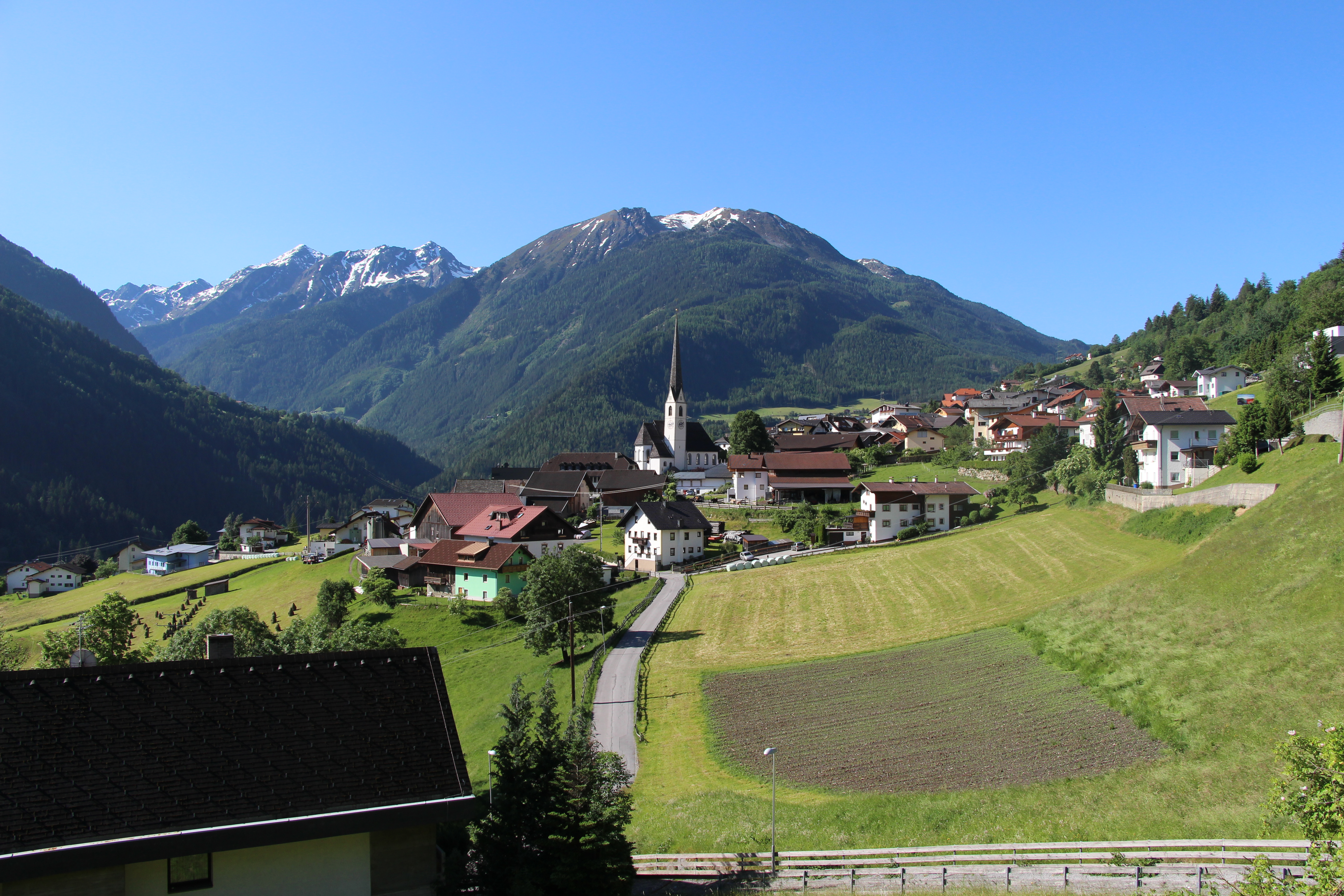
- View of Wenns

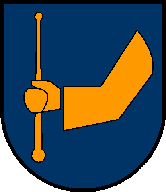
- Coat of arms

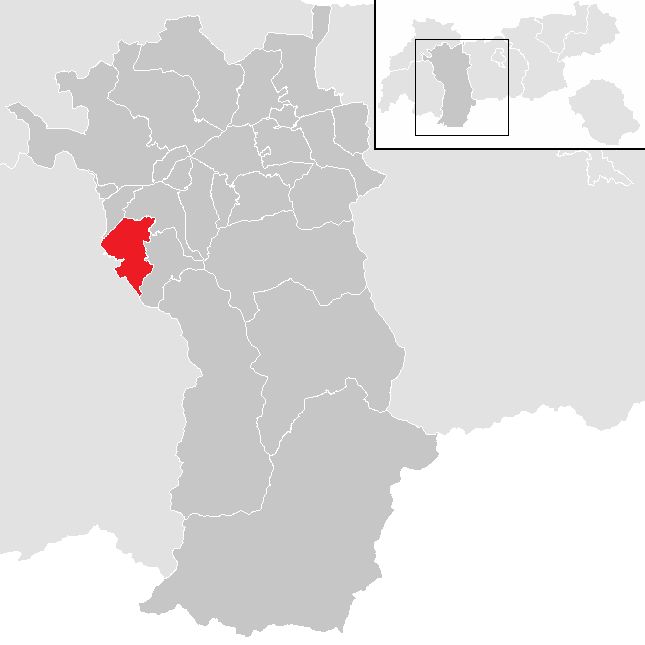
- Location in the district

- Location within Austria Wenns (Tyrol, Austria)
- Coordinates: 47°10′00″N 10°43′00″E
- Country: Austria
- State: Tyrol
- District: Imst

Government
  - Mayor: Walter Schöpf (Lebensraum Wenns)

Area
  - Total: 29.65 km^{2} (11.45 sq mi)
- Elevation: 962 m (3,156 ft)

Population (2021)
  - Total: 2,081
  - Density: 70.19/km^{2} (181.8/sq mi)
- Time zone: UTC+1 (CET)
  - Summer (DST): UTC+2 (CEST)
- Postal code: 6473
- Area code: 05414
- Vehicle registration: IM
- Website: http://www.wenns.tirol.gv.at/

Wenns (German pronunciation: [vɛns]) is a municipality in the Imst district 7.30 km south of Imst at the Pitze river. Due to its central location in the Pitztal valley it is one of the area's key villages. The primary source of income is tourism, especially skiing even though there is no skiing in Wenns itself. The 700-year-old Stamserhaus in Wenns is the oldest farmhouse in Tyrol.

== Population ==
Historical population
Year	Pop.	±%
1869	1,177	—
1880	1,197	+1.7%
1890	1,167	−2.5%
1900	1,065	−8.7%
1910	1,114	+4.6%
1923	994	−10.8%
1934	1,147	+15.4%
1939	1,290	+12.5%
1951	1,336	+3.6%
1961	1,489	+11.5%
1971	1,669	+12.1%
1981	1,814	+8.7%
1991	1,896	+4.5%
2001	2,020	+6.5%
2011	1,979	−2.0%
