= Imsterberg =

- Municipality
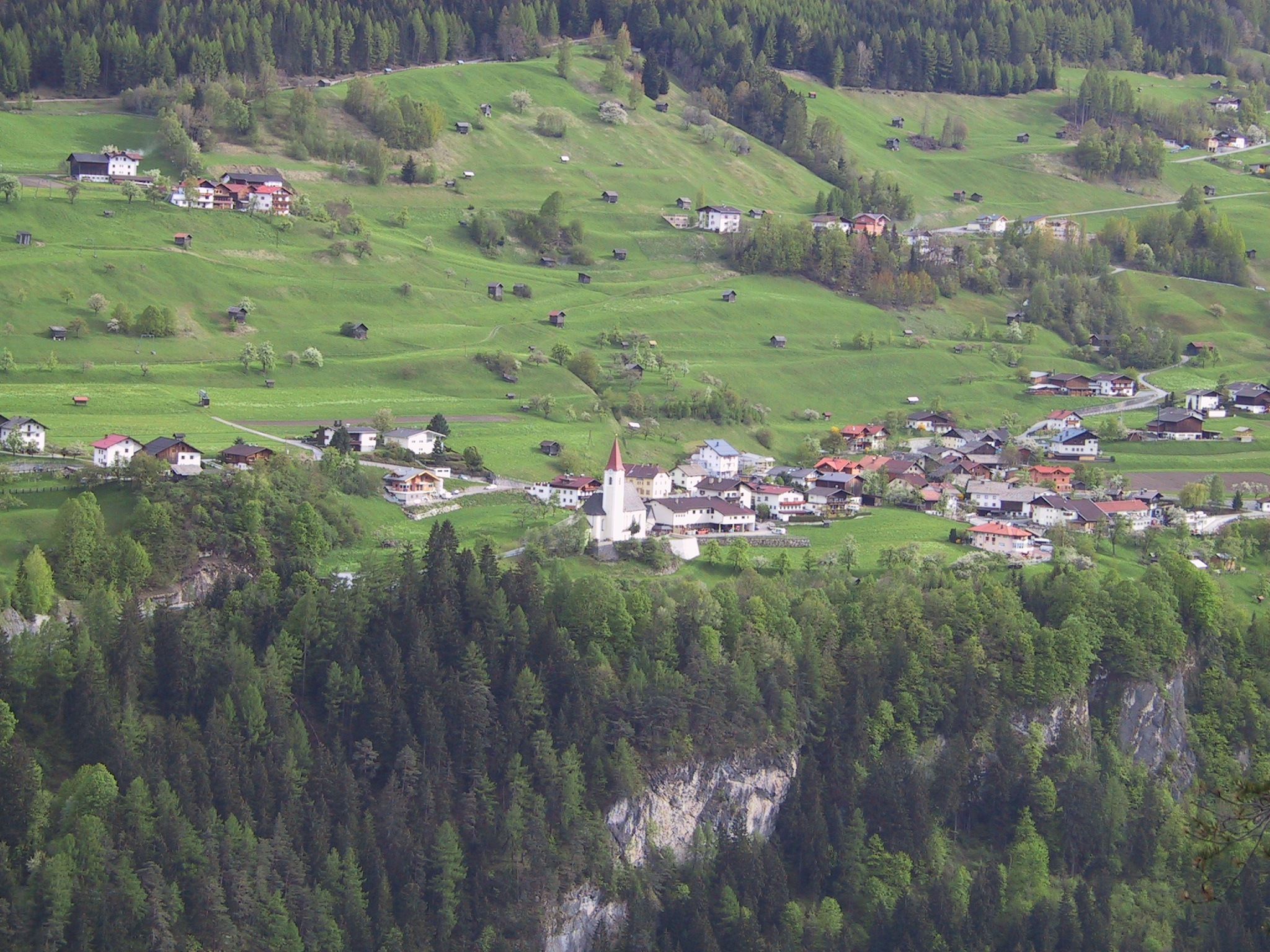

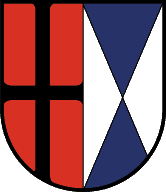
- Coat of arms

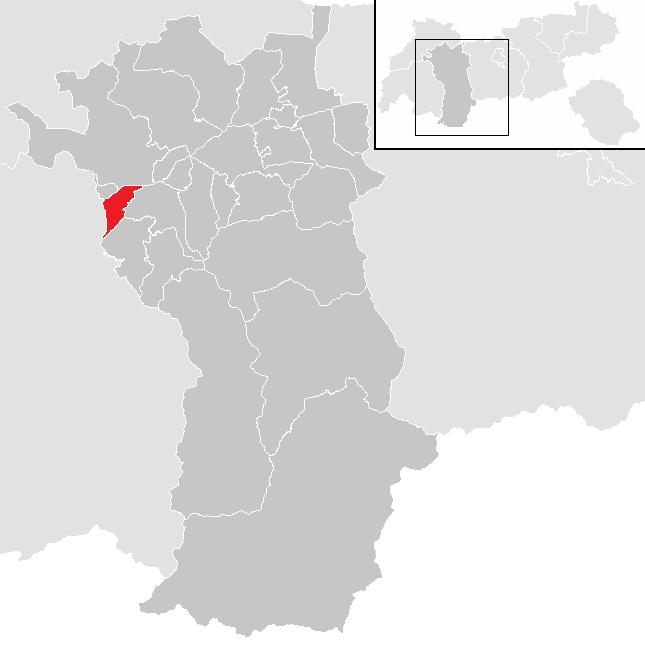
- Location in the district

- Location within Austria
- Coordinates: 47°12′20″N 10°41′50″E
- Country: Austria
- State: Tyrol
- District: Imst

Government
  - Mayor: Alois Thurner

Area
  - Total: 10.86 km^{2} (4.19 sq mi)
- Elevation: 879 m (2,884 ft)

Population (2020)
  - Total: 801
  - Density: 73.8/km^{2} (191/sq mi)
- Time zone: UTC+1 (CET)
  - Summer (DST): UTC+2 (CEST)
- Postal code: 6492
- Area code: 05412
- Vehicle registration: IM
- Website: www.imsterberg.tirol.gv.at

Imsterberg is a municipality and a town in the district of Imst located 4.4 kilometres (2.7 mi) west of Imst.

== Population ==
Historical population
Year	Pop.	±%
1869	483	—
1880	468	−3.1%
1890	420	−10.3%
1900	379	−9.8%
1910	418	+10.3%
1923	429	+2.6%
1934	408	−4.9%
1939	416	+2.0%
1951	436	+4.8%
1961	514	+17.9%
1971	578	+12.5%
1981	596	+3.1%
1991	690	+15.8%
2001	735	+6.5%
2011	753	+2.4%

== Economy ==
The main source of income is agriculture.
