= Sankt Leonhard im Pitztal =

St. Leonhard im Pitztal
- Municipality
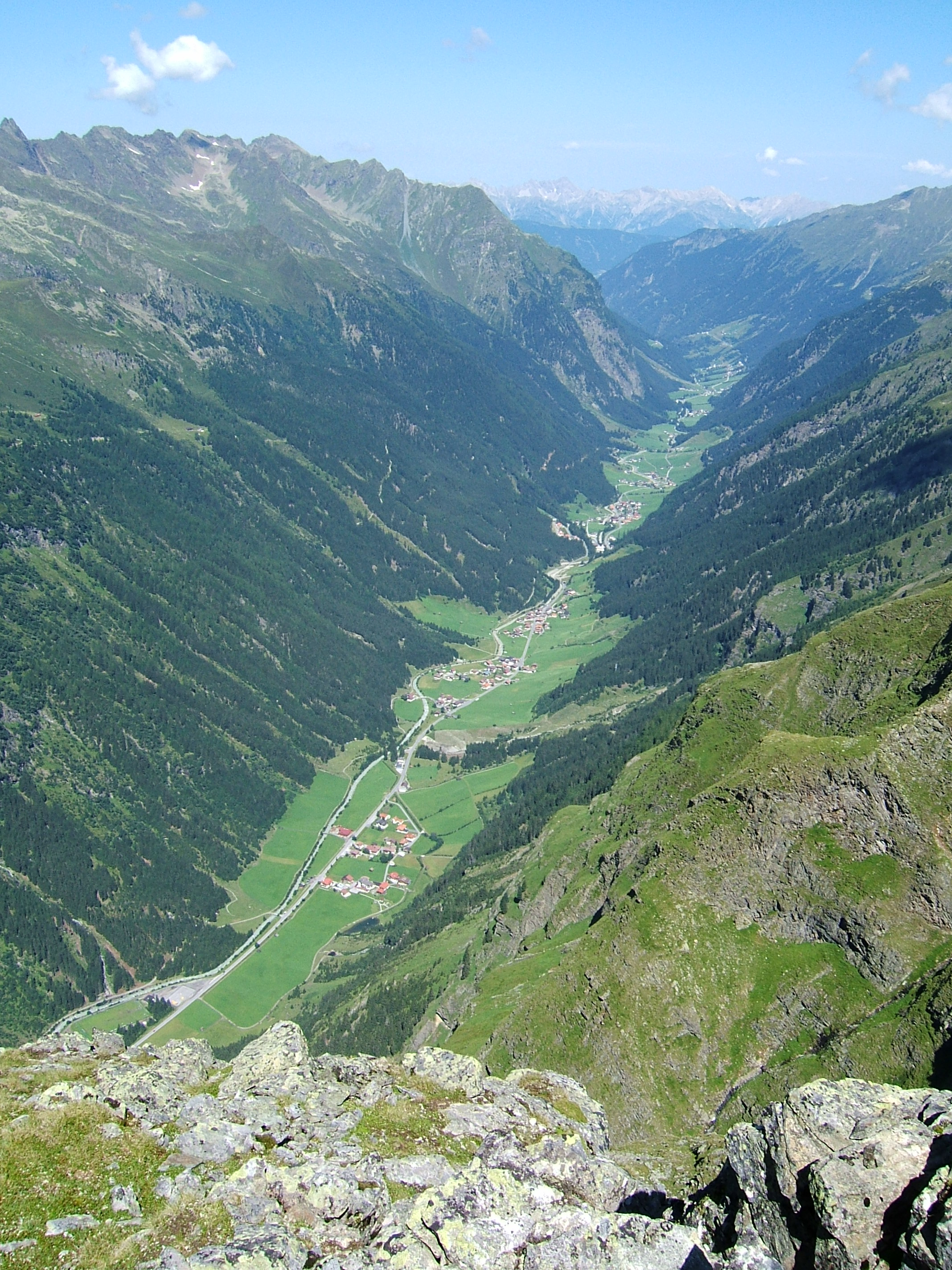

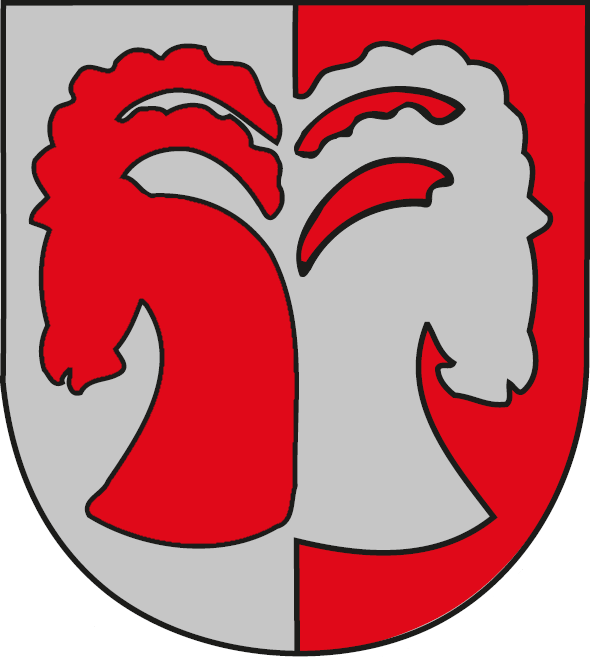
- Coat of arms

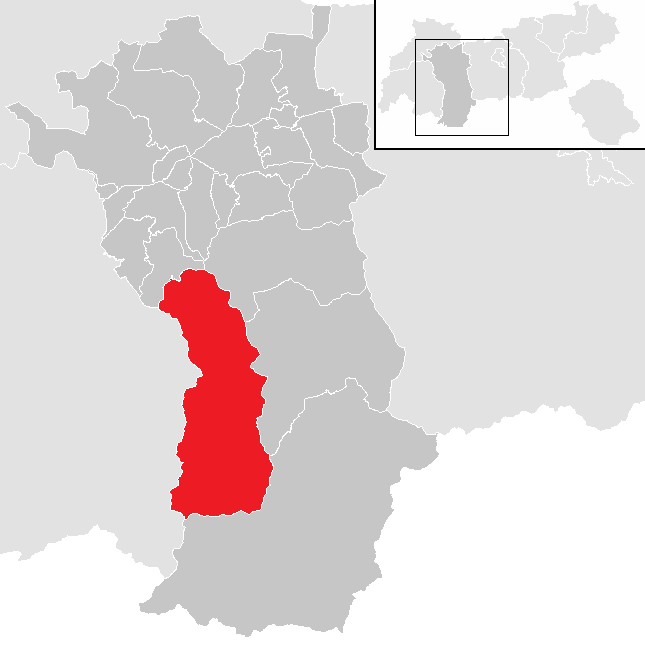
- Location in the district

- Location within Austria St. Leonhard im Pitztal (Tyrol, Austria)
- Coordinates: 47°04′00″N 10°50′00″E
- Country: Austria
- State: Tyrol
- District: Imst

Government
  - Mayor: Rupert Hosp

Area
  - Total: 223.53 km^{2} (86.31 sq mi)
- Elevation: 1,366 m (4,482 ft)

Population (2020)
  - Total: 1,384
  - Density: 6.192/km^{2} (16.04/sq mi)
- Time zone: UTC+1 (CET)
  - Summer (DST): UTC+2 (CEST)
- Postal code: 6481
- Area code: 05413
- Vehicle registration: IM
- Website: www.st-leonhard.tirol.gv.at

Sankt Leonhard im Pitztal is a municipality in the Imst district, located 20 kilometres (12 mi) south of Imst on the upper course of the Pitze River in western Austria. The village covers a large area and has a length of around 25 kilometres (16 mi). It is one of the biggest communities of Tyrol by area.

The climate is severe because of mountain flanks. The area was founded around 1300, and its main source of income is tourism.

== Climate ==
Climate data for St.Leonhard Pitztal: 1454m (1991−2020)
Month	Jan	Feb	Mar	Apr	May	Jun	Jul	Aug	Sep	Oct	Nov	Dec	Year
Record high °C (°F)	11.7 (53.1)	13.4 (56.1)	18.8 (65.8)	21.6 (70.9)	25.8 (78.4)	31.2 (88.2)	30.3 (86.5)	29.3 (84.7)	24.8 (76.6)	22.3 (72.1)	19.2 (66.6)	12.3 (54.1)	31.2 (88.2)
Mean daily maximum °C (°F)	0.9 (33.6)	2.7 (36.9)	6.0 (42.8)	10.1 (50.2)	14.3 (57.7)	18.2 (64.8)	19.3 (66.7)	18.8 (65.8)	15.3 (59.5)	11.1 (52.0)	5.5 (41.9)	1.3 (34.3)	10.3 (50.5)
Daily mean °C (°F)	−4.7 (23.5)	−3.7 (25.3)	0.2 (32.4)	4.0 (39.2)	8.6 (47.5)	12.0 (53.6)	13.8 (56.8)	13.4 (56.1)	9.5 (49.1)	5.5 (41.9)	0.3 (32.5)	−3.8 (25.2)	4.6 (40.3)
Mean daily minimum °C (°F)	−9.5 (14.9)	−10.2 (13.6)	−5.4 (22.3)	−1.8 (28.8)	2.4 (36.3)	5.8 (42.4)	7.4 (45.3)	7.3 (45.1)	4.0 (39.2)	0.1 (32.2)	−4.5 (23.9)	−8.0 (17.6)	−1.0 (30.1)
Record low °C (°F)	−23.6 (−10.5)	−28.4 (−19.1)	−25.2 (−13.4)	−15.9 (3.4)	−6.8 (19.8)	−2.7 (27.1)	−0.5 (31.1)	−1.0 (30.2)	−5.3 (22.5)	−14.2 (6.4)	−18.4 (−1.1)	−22.3 (−8.1)	−28.4 (−19.1)
Source: Central Institute for Meteorology and Geodynamics

== Population ==
Historical population
Year	Pop.	±%
1869	1,147	—
1880	1,057	−7.8%
1890	1,039	−1.7%
1900	986	−5.1%
1910	1,032	+4.7%
1923	932	−9.7%
1934	983	+5.5%
1939	989	+0.6%
1951	1,042	+5.4%
1961	1,150	+10.4%
1971	1,224	+6.4%
1981	1,299	+6.1%
1991	1,404	+8.1%
2001	1,472	+4.8%
2011	1,463	−0.6%
