= Sautens =

- Municipality
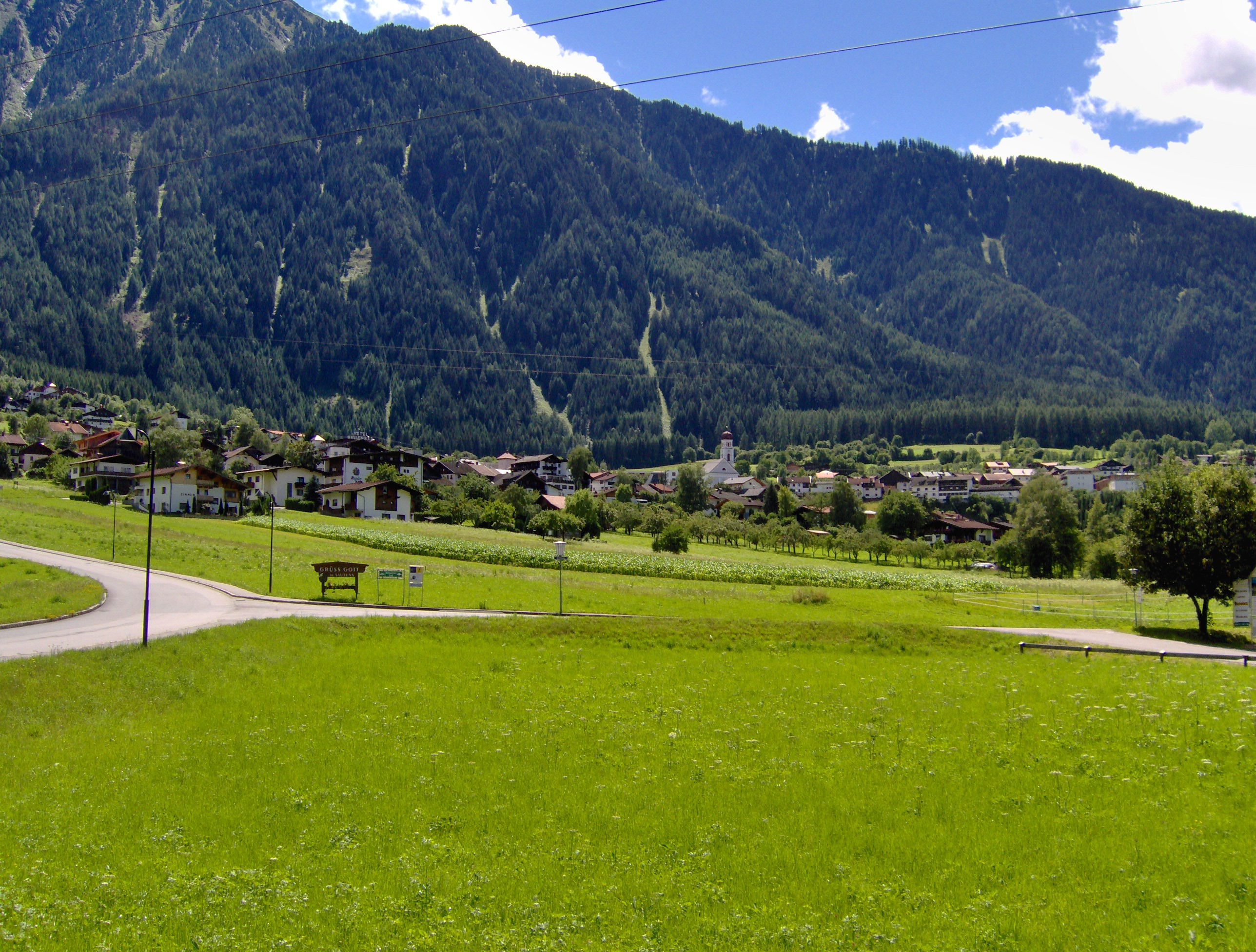

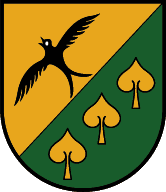
- Coat of arms

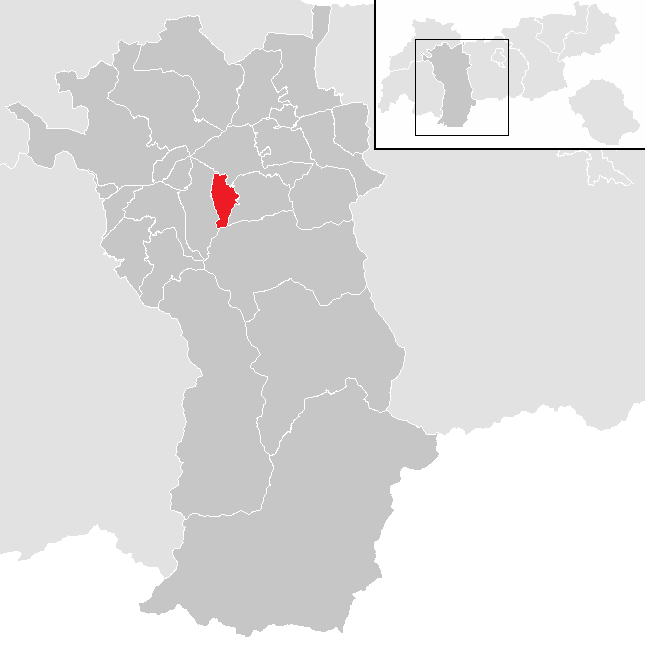
- Location in the district

- Location within Austria
- Coordinates: 47°12′30″N 10°51′55″E
- Country: Austria
- State: Tyrol
- District: Imst

Government
  - Mayor: Manfred Köll

Area
  - Total: 11.61 km^{2} (4.48 sq mi)
- Elevation: 812 m (2,664 ft)

Population (2021)
  - Total: 1,640
  - Density: 141/km^{2} (366/sq mi)
- Time zone: UTC+1 (CET)
  - Summer (DST): UTC+2 (CEST)
- Postal code: 6432
- Area code: 05252
- Vehicle registration: IM
- Website: www.sautens.tirol.gv.at

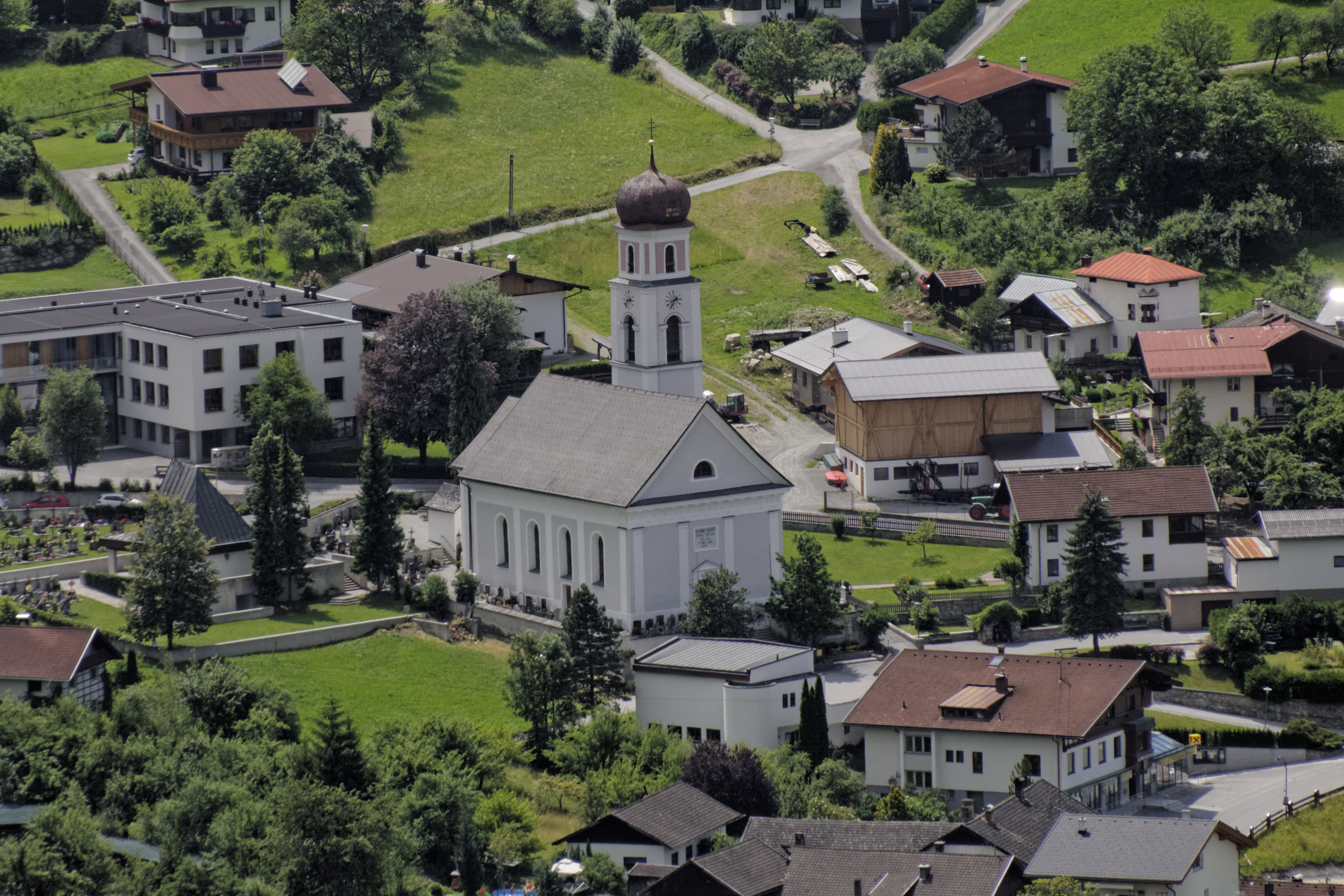
Sautens Neue Pfarrkirche

Sautens is a municipality in the Imst district located 9 kilometres (6 mi) southeast of Imst on the lower course of the Ötztaler Ache. The village is located to catch the sun but is protected from the wind, which makes for an especially mild climate. The main source of income is agriculture. Fruit is especially important with a good part of the harvest used to make Schnapps.

The name of the village appears to originate from Roman times. Sautens was once connected with Oetz but became its own community in 1836. Recently the village has experienced increasing tourism.

== Population ==
Historical population
Year	Pop.	±%
1869	692	—
1880	657	−5.1%
1890	609	−7.3%
1900	559	−8.2%
1910	543	−2.9%
1923	604	+11.2%
1934	650	+7.6%
1939	654	+0.6%
1951	761	+16.4%
1961	792	+4.1%
1971	927	+17.0%
1981	1,081	+16.6%
1991	1,203	+11.3%
2001	1,280	+6.4%
2011	1,417	+10.7%
2018	1,601	+13.0%
