= Silz, Tyrol =

Silz
- Municipality
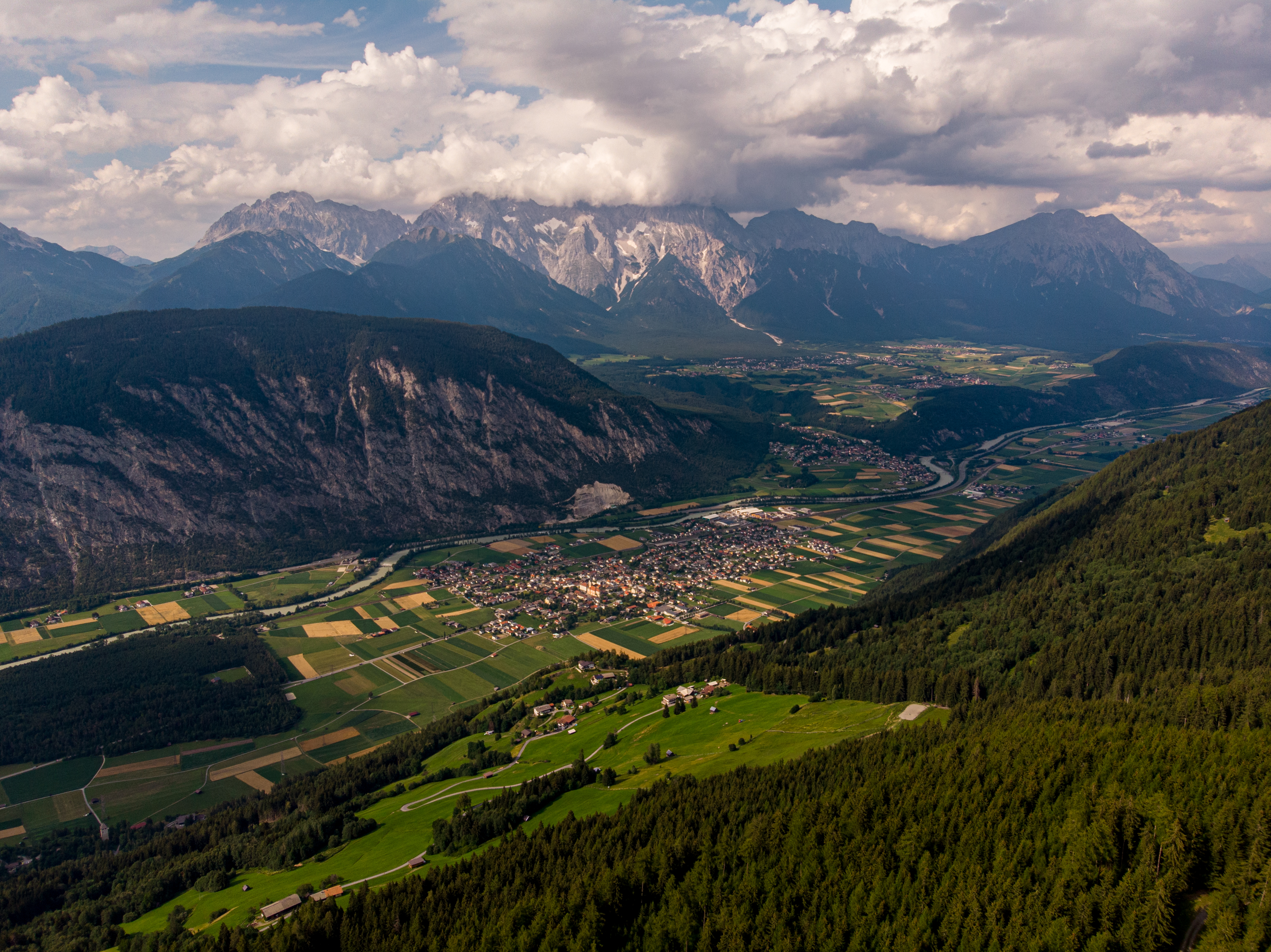
- Silz from above

- Coat of arms

- Location within Austria
- Coordinates: 47°15′55″N 10°55′50″E
- Country: Austria
- State: Tyrol
- District: Imst

Government
  - Mayor: Hermann Föger

Area
  - Total: 65.67 km^{2} (25.36 sq mi)
- Elevation: 654 m (2,146 ft)

Population (2021)
  - Total: 2,570
  - Density: 39.1/km^{2} (101/sq mi)
- Time zone: UTC+1 (CET)
  - Summer (DST): UTC+2 (CEST)
- Postal code: 6424
- Area code: 05263
- Vehicle registration: IM
- Website: www.silz.tirol.gv.at

Silz (Austrian German pronunciation: [sɪlts]) is a municipality in Austria in the Imst district. It is located 15 kilometres (9.3 mi) east of Imst and 11 kilometres (6.8 mi) west of Telfs. The ski resort Kühtai administratively belongs to the village area. Besides winter tourism, summer tourism, especially rafting on the Inn River, is also an important source of income for Silz.

== Population ==
Historical population
Year	Pop.	±%
1869	1,237	—
1880	1,271	+2.7%
1890	1,169	−8.0%
1900	1,206	+3.2%
1910	1,240	+2.8%
1923	1,212	−2.3%
1934	1,409	+16.3%
1939	1,341	−4.8%
1951	1,520	+13.3%
1961	1,782	+17.2%
1971	2,036	+14.3%
1981	2,080	+2.2%
1991	2,245	+7.9%
2001	2,373	+5.7%
2011	2,582	+8.8%

== Notable people ==
- Helmuth Orthner (1941–2009), American scientist
