= Haiming, Tyrol =

Haiming
- Municipality
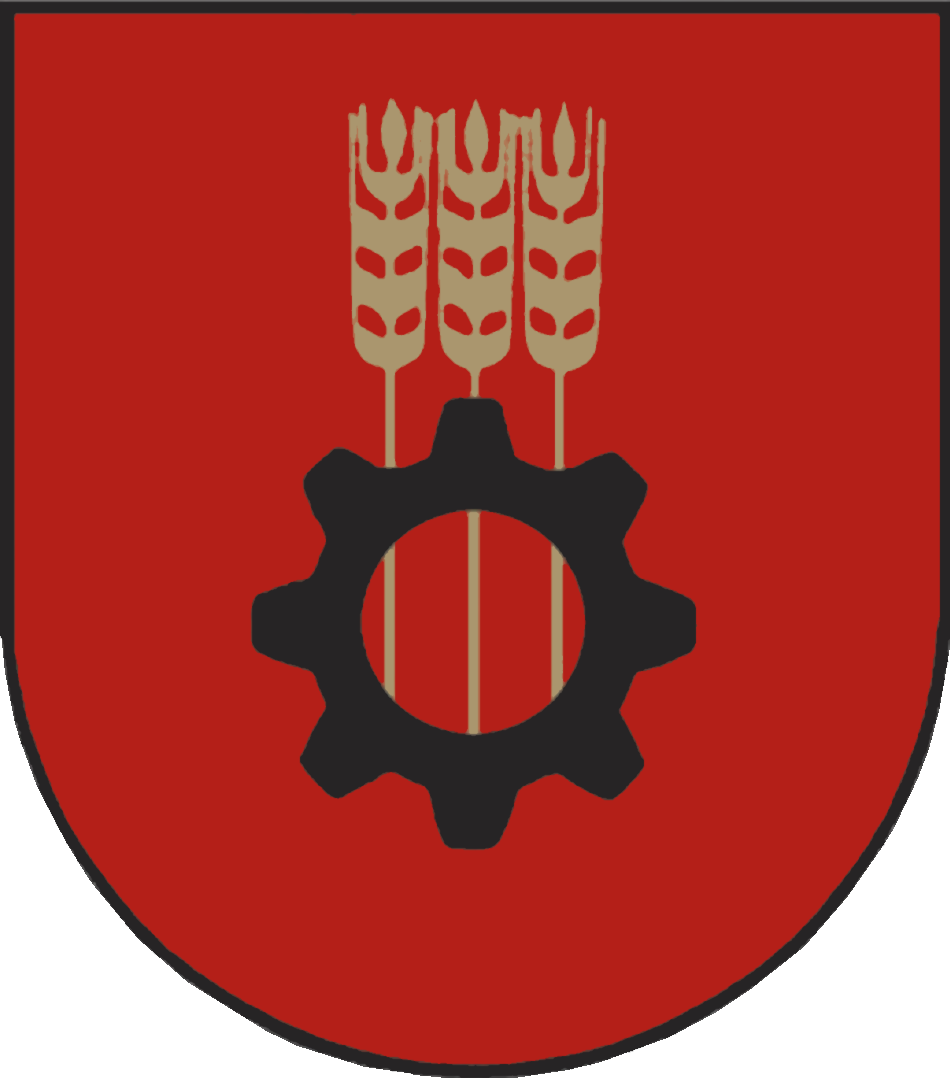
- Coat of arms

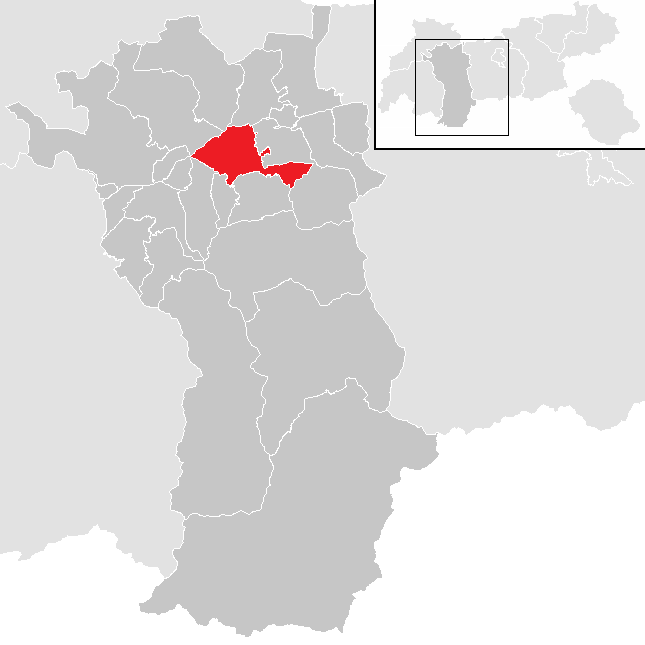
- Location in the district

- Location within Austria
- Coordinates: 47°15′12″N 10°52′53″E
- Country: Austria
- State: Tyrol
- District: Imst

Government
  - Mayor: Josef Leitner (ÖVP)

Area
  - Total: 40.21 km^{2} (15.53 sq mi)
- Elevation: 670 m (2,200 ft)

Population (2018-01-01)
  - Total: 4,659
  - Density: 115.9/km^{2} (300.1/sq mi)
- Time zone: UTC+1 (CET)
  - Summer (DST): UTC+2 (CEST)
- Postal code: 6425
- Area code: 05266
- Vehicle registration: IM
- Website: www.haiming.tirol.gv.at

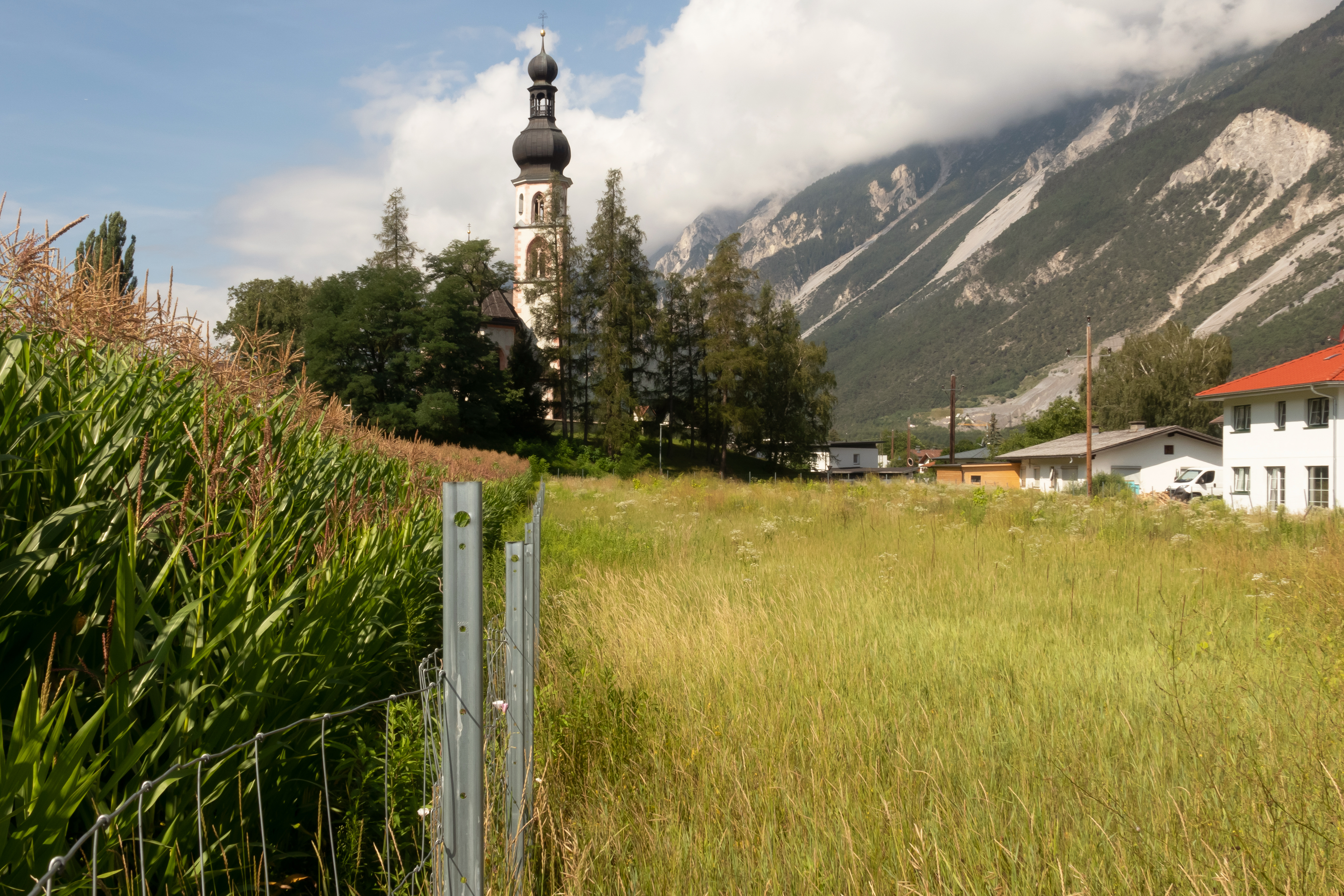
Haiming, churchtower: Pfarrkirche Sankt Chrysanthus und Daria

Haiming (German pronunciation: [ˈhaɪmɪŋ]) is a municipality and the name of its largest town, located in the district of Imst in the Austrian state of Tyrol.

== Geography ==
The town of Haiming is located 11 km east of Imst. The municipality consists eight villages.

== Climate ==
Climate data for Haiming, Tyrol (1971–2000)
Month	Jan	Feb	Mar	Apr	May	Jun	Jul	Aug	Sep	Oct	Nov	Dec	Year
Record high °C (°F)	19.2 (66.6)	18.7 (65.7)	23.4 (74.1)	25.6 (78.1)	30.8 (87.4)	33.9 (93.0)	38.3 (100.9)	35.7 (96.3)	31.1 (88.0)	24.7 (76.5)	21.7 (71.1)	16.8 (62.2)	38.3 (100.9)
Mean daily maximum °C (°F)	2.8 (37.0)	5.7 (42.3)	11.1 (52.0)	14.7 (58.5)	20.0 (68.0)	22.4 (72.3)	25.0 (77.0)	24.4 (75.9)	20.5 (68.9)	15.0 (59.0)	7.2 (45.0)	2.8 (37.0)	14.3 (57.7)
Daily mean °C (°F)	−2.9 (26.8)	−1.1 (30.0)	3.7 (38.7)	7.3 (45.1)	12.7 (54.9)	15.4 (59.7)	17.6 (63.7)	16.9 (62.4)	12.8 (55.0)	7.4 (45.3)	1.3 (34.3)	−2.3 (27.9)	7.4 (45.3)
Mean daily minimum °C (°F)	−6.8 (19.8)	−5.4 (22.3)	−1.7 (28.9)	1.3 (34.3)	5.9 (42.6)	9.1 (48.4)	11.1 (52.0)	11.0 (51.8)	7.4 (45.3)	2.7 (36.9)	−2.4 (27.7)	−5.8 (21.6)	2.2 (36.0)
Record low °C (°F)	−25.4 (−13.7)	−19.0 (−2.2)	−16.8 (1.8)	−6.8 (19.8)	−3.8 (25.2)	−0.8 (30.6)	3.1 (37.6)	1.5 (34.7)	−3.3 (26.1)	−9.1 (15.6)	−17.8 (0.0)	−22.4 (−8.3)	−25.4 (−13.7)
Average precipitation mm (inches)	35.8 (1.41)	31.5 (1.24)	40.7 (1.60)	35.4 (1.39)	64.1 (2.52)	96.1 (3.78)	110.4 (4.35)	103.1 (4.06)	64.0 (2.52)	42.9 (1.69)	47.7 (1.88)	45.0 (1.77)	716.7 (28.22)
Average snowfall cm (inches)	19.2 (7.6)	25.1 (9.9)	7.8 (3.1)	0.8 (0.3)	0.3 (0.1)	0.0 (0.0)	0.0 (0.0)	0.0 (0.0)	0.0 (0.0)	0.0 (0.0)	8.5 (3.3)	17.4 (6.9)	79.1 (31.1)
Average precipitation days (≥ 1.0 mm)	6.3	5.2	6.6	6.9	10.1	12.2	12.4	12.6	8.3	6.3	7.4	7.4	101.7
Average relative humidity (%) (at 14:00)	65.4	52.0	40.2	39.1	40.6	44.1	44.5	46.2	47.0	49.8	60.5	70.8	50.0
Source: Central Institute for Meteorology and Geodynamics

== Population ==
Historical population
Year	Pop.	±%
1869	1,275	—
1880	1,250	−2.0%
1890	1,211	−3.1%
1900	1,185	−2.1%
1910	1,206	+1.8%
1923	1,270	+5.3%
1934	1,386	+9.1%
1939	1,467	+5.8%
1951	2,761	+88.2%
1961	2,447	−11.4%
1971	2,976	+21.6%
1981	3,263	+9.6%
1991	3,463	+6.1%
2001	3,901	+12.6%
2011	4,349	+11.5%

== Economy ==
Its main source of income is summer tourism.
