= Rietz =

- Municipality
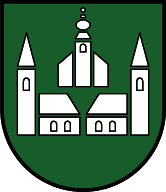
- Coat of arms

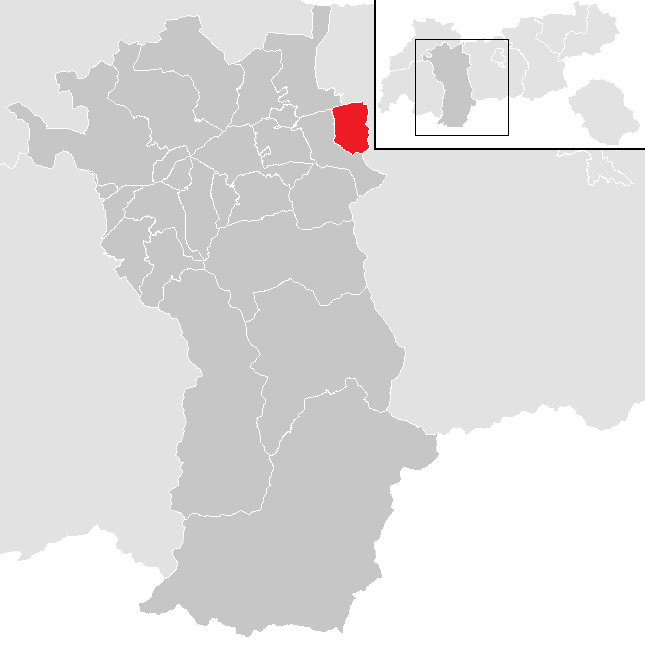
- Location in the district

- Location within Austria
- Coordinates: 47°17′05″N 11°01′50″E
- Country: Austria
- State: Tyrol
- District: Imst

Government
  - Mayor: Gerhard Krug (ÖVP)

Area
  - Total: 19.57 km^{2} (7.56 sq mi)
- Elevation: 685 m (2,247 ft)

Population (2021)
  - Total: 2,450
  - Density: 125/km^{2} (324/sq mi)
- Time zone: UTC+1 (CET)
  - Summer (DST): UTC+2 (CEST)
- Postal code: 6421
- Area code: 05262
- Vehicle registration: IM
- Website: www.rietz.at

For the musician, see Julius Rietz.

Rietz (German pronunciation: [ʁiˈə̯t͡s]) is a municipality in the Imst district, Austria, and is located 23 km east of Imst and 4 km west of Telfs on the southern shore of the Inn River. It is a peculiarity that the village has no sun during winter time because of the height of the Stubai Alps. The village is mentioned in documents dating from the year 1264 and has been a community since the year 1325. The main source of income is tourism.

== Population ==
Historical population
Year	Pop.	±%
1869	959	—
1880	923	−3.8%
1890	905	−2.0%
1900	859	−5.1%
1910	841	−2.1%
1923	892	+6.1%
1934	907	+1.7%
1939	925	+2.0%
1951	1,018	+10.1%
1961	1,047	+2.8%
1971	1,258	+20.2%
1981	1,505	+19.6%
1991	1,759	+16.9%
2001	2,017	+14.7%
2011	2,078	+3.0%
