= Karres =

Municipality in Imst, Tyrol, Austria

- Municipality
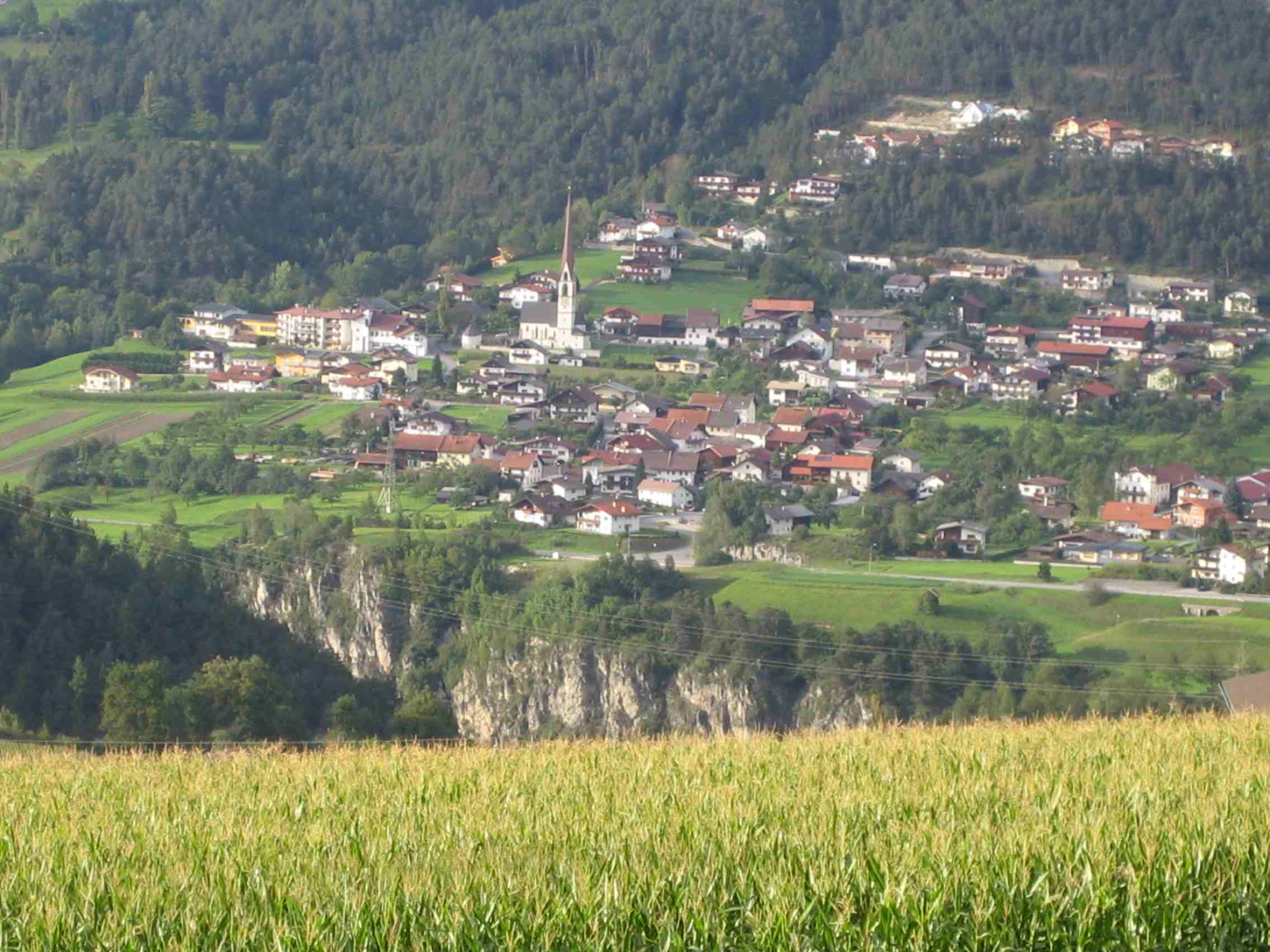

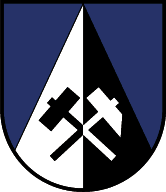
- Coat of arms

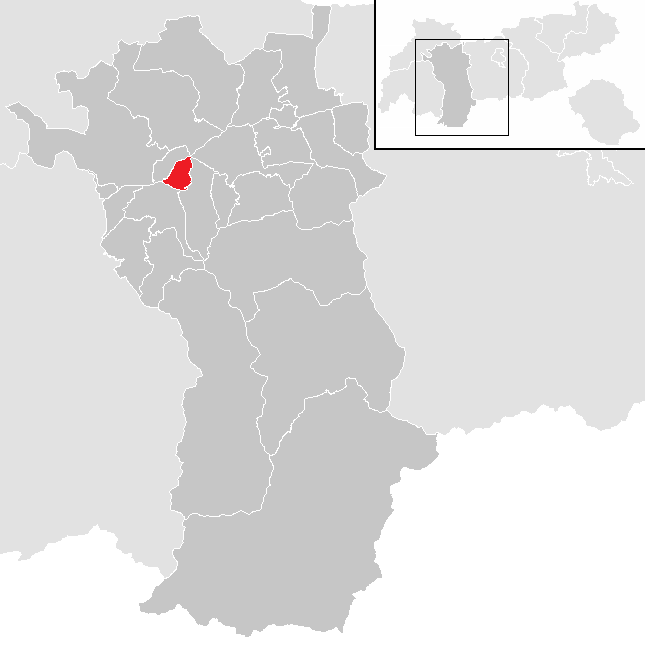
- Location in the district

- Location within Austria
- Coordinates: 47°13′10″N 10°46′30″E
- Country: Austria
- State: Tyrol
- District: Imst

Government
  - Mayor: Wilhelm Schatz

Area
  - Total: 7.52 km^{2} (2.90 sq mi)
- Elevation: 830 m (2,720 ft)

Population (2018-01-01)
  - Total: 609
  - Density: 81.0/km^{2} (210/sq mi)
- Time zone: UTC+1 (CET)
  - Summer (DST): UTC+2 (CEST)
- Postal code: 6462
- Area code: 05412
- Vehicle registration: IM

Karres is a municipality and a village in the district of Imst in Austria and is located 2.5 km east of Imst near the mouth of the Pitze River. The village was founded in the Middle Ages because of mining. It has 589 inhabitants.

== Population ==
Historical population
Year	Pop.	±%
1869	402	—
1880	323	−19.7%
1890	327	+1.2%
1900	323	−1.2%
1910	312	−3.4%
1923	290	−7.1%
1934	293	+1.0%
1939	338	+15.4%
1951	306	−9.5%
1961	354	+15.7%
1971	431	+21.8%
1981	473	+9.7%
1991	509	+7.6%
2001	575	+13.0%
2011	606	+5.4%
