= Imst District =

Coordinates: 47.1°N 10.9°E

Imst District Bezirk Imst
- District
- Country: Austria
- State: Tyrol
- Number of municipalities: 24
- Administrative seat: Imst

Government
  - District Governor: Eva Loidhold

Area
  - Total: 1,724.65 km^{2} (665.89 sq mi)

Population (2012)
  - Total: 57,734
  - Density: 33.476/km^{2} (86.702/sq mi)
- Time zone: UTC+01:00 (CET)
  - Summer (DST): UTC+02:00 (CEST)
- Vehicle registration: IM

The Bezirk Imst is an administrative district (Bezirk) in Tyrol, Austria. It borders the district Reutte in the north, as well as sharing a small border with Bavaria (Germany). It borders the district Innsbruck-Land in the east, South Tyrol (Italy) in the south, and the district Landeck in the west.

Area of the district is 1,724.65 square kilometres (665.89 sq mi), which makes it by area rank 4 of the districts of Tyrol, with a population of 57,734 (as of January 1, 2012) (Number 6 in Tyrol), and a population density of 33 persons per km^{2}. The administrative center of the district is Imst.

== Geography ==
The district comprises a part of the upper Inn valley, with its tributary valleys Ötztal, Pitztal, and Gurgltal, and the Mieming Plateau. The area is dominated by high alpine mountains. Mountain ranges include the Stubai Alps, Ötztal Alps, and Mieminger Mountains. The District is around 35 km from west to east and 80 km from north to south. The Highest mountain is the Wildspitze (3.768 meters), the second highest mountain of Tyrol and the highest mountain of North Tyrol (all districts of Tyrol without the Lienz District). The Imst District is the southeast District of North Tyrol and includes one of the three passes from North to South Tyrol (Province Bolzano-Bozen, Italy), the Timmelsjoch, which is also the highest pass of Tyrol.

== History ==
Through the Imst district there had always been an important route between Northern Italy and Germany. During the Roman empire, there was situated the most important route over the alps in Imst District: The Via Claudia Augusta. During the "Völkerwanderung" in the 4th and 5th century, mostly raetoromanic people lived there. Then in the 8th century bavarians came from the north and east and divided the area in 2 areas: the lower Inn valley eastwards of the Oetztal Valley and the Gurgltal Valley around Imst. Around 780 the Area came to the Franconian Empire, even though only in the Intall Valley there were German-speaking people. In the smaller valleys the people spoke raetoromanic. Around the year 1200 there were 2 courts: Imst, which the western parts belonged to and Silz, which included the eastern parts. 1269, the court Silz came to the County of Tyrol, while Imst belonged to it since the 12th century. Since that, the whole Imst district belonged to Tyrol.

Historical population
Year	Pop.	±%
1869	23,079	—
1880	22,621	−2.0%
1890	21,387	−5.5%
1900	20,957	−2.0%
1910	21,536	+2.8%
1923	21,842	+1.4%
1934	24,210	+10.8%
1939	25,426	+5.0%
1951	29,954	+17.8%
1961	33,174	+10.7%
1971	38,326	+15.5%
1981	42,358	+10.5%
1991	46,833	+10.6%
2001	52,658	+12.4%
Source: Statistik Austria

== Administrative divisions ==
The municipalities of the district:

- Arzl im Pitztal (2,987)
- Haiming (4,458)
- Imst (9,523)
- Imsterberg (747)
- Jerzens (1,029)
- Karres (614)
- Karrösten (684)
- Längenfeld (4,326)
- Mieming (3,458)
- Mils bei Imst (548)
- Mötz (1,242)
- Nassereith (2,065)
- Obsteig (1,189)
- Oetz (2,315)
- Rietz (2,126)
- Roppen (1,664)
- Sankt Leonhard im Pitztal (1,466)
- Sautens (1,427)
- Silz (2,555)
- Sölden (4,252)
- Stams (1,340)
- Tarrenz (2,650)
- Umhausen (3,100)
- Wenns (1,969)
