= Mother's Cake =

Austrian band

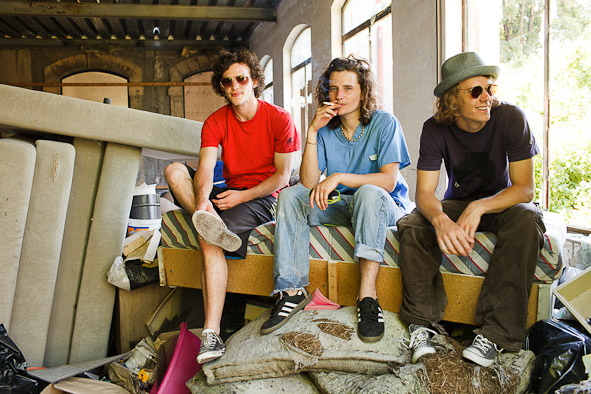
- Mother's Cake. Left to right: Benedikt Trenkwalder, Yves Krismer and Jan Haußels.

Background information
- Origin: Tirol, Austria
- Genres: Alternative rock, progressive rock, funk rock, hard rock
- Years active: 2008–present
- Members: Yves Krismer; Benedikt Trenkwalder; Raphael Neikes; Alex Kerbl
- Past members: Jan Haußels
- Website: motherscake.com

Mother's Cake are an Austrian psychedelic space rock band.

== History ==
In November 2008 Yves Krismer (guitar, vocals), Benedikt Trenkwalder (Bass) and Jan Haußels (Drums) met first to jam in Arzl im Pitztal, a small village in the Tyrolean Alps and hometown of Yves Krismer. Not long after that, they founded the band Mother's Cake. Their music is influenced by different bands like The Mars Volta, Red Hot Chili Peppers, Led Zeppelin or Bootsy Collins. They play a mixture of funk, hard rock and progressive, psychedelic parts.

They started playing gigs in the western parts of Tyrol and also in its capital Innsbruck. In 2009 they entered their first big band contest with about 1.000 participating bands – the International Live Award feat. Austrian Band Contest 2010. They clearly won both preliminary rounds for Tyrol and Vorarlberg as favourites of the official judges. Despite being the judges' favourites at the finals in Vienna they only came in third.

At the beginning of 2010 they participated in the Local Heroes Austria 2010 Band Contest. They won the two preliminary rounds and the final round of the western Austrian states Vorarlberg, Tyrol and Salzburg as the judges' explicit favourites. Finally, on May 29, 2010, they won the Austrian finals in Vienna. They were not only awarded for being the best band of the contest, but each band member separately for their musical achievements as best singer, best bass player and best drummer of the competition.

On August 18, 2010 GoTV – the Austrian music TV channel – aired one hour of 'hosted by Mother's Cake' and the music video to 'Realitricked Me' was first shown in public. The EP was published on September 1, 2010.

On November 26, 2010 they participated at the European finals of the Local Heroes 2010 Band Contest in Pécs/Hungary. They competed against the Local Heroes finalists of Germany, Hungary and Italy and the finalists of different contests all over Europe. In the end, Mother's Cake came in second after the Danish band Rufus Spencer.

The director Henning Backhaus, a student of Michael Haneke, used a couple of their songs for the soundtrack of his film "Local Heroes" and even involved the band at the shooting. The film is about the upsurge of a young band, just like Mother's Cake. The film was premiered at the 62. Berlin International Film Festival from February 9 to 19, 2012. Their debut "Creation’s Finest" (release-date: October 26, 2012) was produced by Georg Gabler and got featured by Ikey Owens († 2014, member of The Mars Volta & Jack White). Creation's Finest created a big stir in national and international music press and ensured Mother's Cake a firm stand in the business.

The first single "Soul Prison" (August 17, 2012) reached over 400,000 views on Youtube.

In 2013 they got awarded with the "Austrian Newcomer Award″ and played many sold-out shows including support gigs for Iggy and The Stooges, Living Colour, Omar Rodriguez Lopez Group, Deftones and Tito & Tarantula.

The "Endless Space Tour 2014″ led them to Australia in February 2014. They band was welcomed cordially in Down Under and successfully played 12 shows in 2 weeks. On April 4, Mother's Cake released their debut in Germany, played a tour there and announced their new video project.

“Off The Beaten Track" presents itself as a 45-minutes long movie that features a whole live-set of Mother's Cake. It was funded successfully through a crowd-funding project and was officially released on July 17, 2014.

In fall 2014, Mother's Cake supported Anathema on their Distant Satellites tour leading through 20 countries playing 42 shows in 56 days.

Their second studio album "Love The Filth" released on June 5, 2015, via the new founded label Panta R&E including the single "Gojira". Again the reviews were positive. Subsequently Mother's Cake was announced as support of Limp Bizkit on four shows, one of them in London.

In 2016 Mother's Cake headlined again in Germany, recorded their 3rd studio album and went on tour with Bobby Liebling's Pentagram and Wolfmother.

On January 27, 2017 they released No Rhyme No Reason via Membran Media/The Orchard and showcased at Eurosonic Noorderslag in Groningen, The Netherlands. Sold out shows followed in Melbourne, Brisbane and Sydney at a 7- dates-tour through Australia. Until April the band played 44 shows in Australia, Germany, Austria and Switzerland with 11 sold out shows. A special highlight was the tour's ending in Vienna with 800 people at the Arena and another 38 shows were booked for the following fall.

In 2018 the heavy touring mode was kept up and the band played more than 100 shows in UK, Romania, Hungary, Germany, Croatia, Bulgaria, Austria, and Switzerland. Additionally, they performed two shows at the Great Escape in Brighton and one at Liverpool's Soundcity, which was followed by the nomination for the Austrian Amadeus Award in the category "Hard & Heavy". In July, the band was invited to play 4 Shows with Alice in Chains. On September 17, Mother's Cake released their 2nd live album Live at Bergisel via Membran/The Orchard /SONY, where they recorded the whole album in the famous Austrian skijumping arena in Innsbruck and also videos documenting the event.

In January 2019 the band played their first shows in India at the Humming Tree in Bangalore and the Sula Fest near Mumbai.

On March 6th, 2024, Mother's Cake announce original drummer Jan Calaveras Haußels is leaving the band.

The band's fifth studio album Ultrabliss was released on October 18, 2024. The album was created in Sevenarts Studio, Überlärm Studio, and Moonwalker Productions Studio and once again sonically crafted by Yves Krismer, in collaboration with Manuel Renner and Raphael Neikes. That multi-instrumentalist Neikes – who plays both guitar and keys live – has become a permanent fourth member of the band, which operated as a trio until the 2021 release of Studio Live Sessions, is not the only personnel change: while bassist Benedikt Trenkwalder was unexpectedly prevented from participating in the recordings due to illness and was fortunately replaced by Arthur Darnhofer-Demar on the 4-string, founding drummer Jan Haußels amicably left the band after completing the album sessions and 14 years together. A successor has already been found in Alex Kerbl, who has successfully passed the trial by fire of their first joint stage appearances.

The band's sixth studio album WE R ALL GONNA DIE was released on October 9, 2026. It was preceded by singles WE R ALL GONNA DIE (released May 8, 2026), TAKE IT EASY (released September 11, 2026), and ALL FOR NOTHING (released October 2, 2026).

== Pre-history ==
Yves Krismer and Benedikt Trenkwalder already succeeded with their Band Brainwashed. They came second at the Austrian Band Contest 2005 and released two albums. They played as supporting band for Velvet Revolver, Tito & Tarantula, Le Tigre and others.

== Members ==
- Yves Krismer – vocals, guitar (2008–present)
- Benedikt Trenkwalder – bass (2008–present)
- Raphael Neikes – keys, backing guitar & vocals (2021–2023 (touring); 2024–present)
- Alex Kerbl – drums (2024–present)

Past members:

- Jan Haußels – drums (2008–2024)

== Discography ==
=== Albums ===
- Creation's Finest (2012)
- Off the Beaten Track (2014; live album)
- Love the Filth (2015)
- No Rhyme No Reason (2017)
- Live at Bergisel (2018)
- Cyberfunk! (2020)
- Ultrabliss (2024)
- We R All Gonna Die (2026)

=== EPs ===
- Mother's Cake (2010)

=== Singles ===
- "The Killer" (2016)
- "Black Roses" (2017)
- "Obey the Machine" (2017)
- "Toxic Brother" (2020)
- "Crystals in the Sky" (2020)
- "Love Your Smell" (2020)
- "Screwed" (feat. Spiral Drive) (2021)
- "One of These Days" (2024)
- "On a Trip" (2024)
- "Serotonin" (2024)
- "WE R ALL GONNA DIE" (2026)
- "TAKE IT EASY" (2026)
- "ALL FOR NOTHING" (2026)

=== Videos ===
- Mother's Cake – Realitricked Me
- GoTV hosted by Mother's Cake
- One of These Days
