= Mils bei Imst =

- Municipality
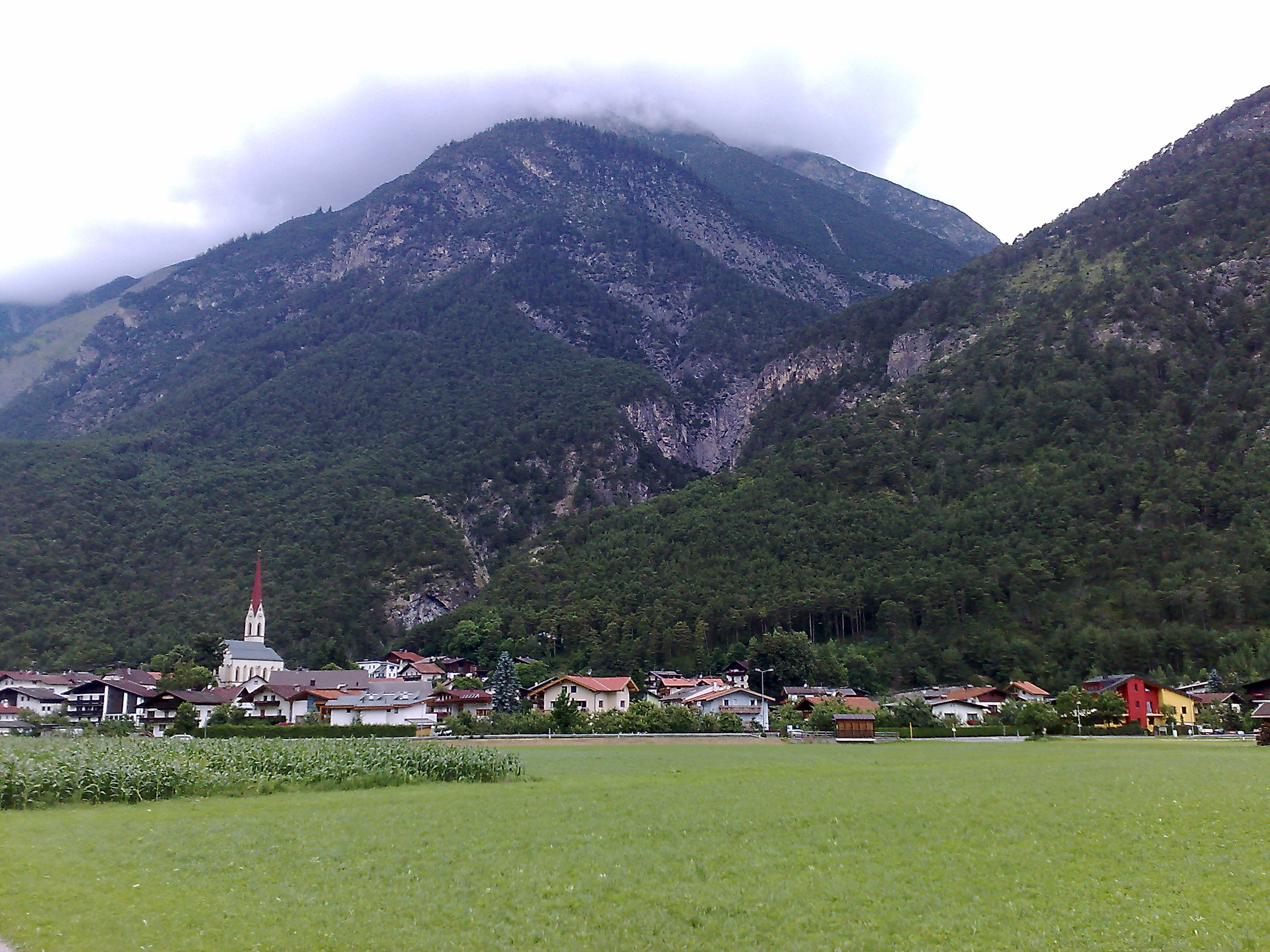

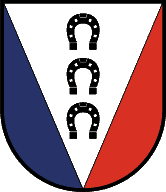
- Coat of arms

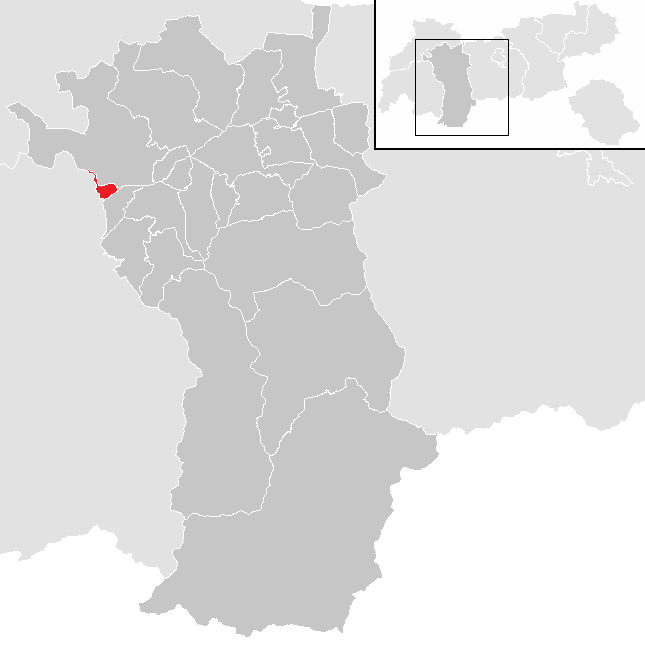
- Location in the district

- Location within Austria
- Coordinates: 47°12′20″N 10°40′25″E
- Country: Austria
- State: Tyrol
- District: Imst

Government
  - Mayor: Markus Moser

Area
  - Total: 3.49 km^{2} (1.35 sq mi)
- Elevation: 743 m (2,438 ft)

Population (2021)
  - Total: 610
  - Density: 170/km^{2} (450/sq mi)
- Time zone: UTC+1 (CET)
  - Summer (DST): UTC+2 (CEST)
- Postal code: 6491
- Area code: 05418
- Vehicle registration: IM
- Website: www.mils-bei-imst.tirol.gv.at

Mils bei Imst is a municipality in the Imst district and is located 5 km west of Imst. Thanks to a motorway tunnel the location is free of heavy traffic. Mils possesses a flood-meadow which is a popular recreation area.

== Population ==
Historical population
Year	Pop.	±%
1869	154	—
1880	165	+7.1%
1890	155	−6.1%
1900	145	−6.5%
1910	150	+3.4%
1923	163	+8.7%
1934	169	+3.7%
1939	174	+3.0%
1951	209	+20.1%
1961	254	+21.5%
1971	321	+26.4%
1981	389	+21.2%
1991	443	+13.9%
2001	557	+25.7%
2011	553	−0.7%
