= Helmuth Orthner =

American health informatician

Helly Orthner
- Born: March 27, 1941; Silz, Tyrol, Austria
- Died: March 16, 2009 (aged 67); Washington D.C., US
- Education: Technical University of Munich, University of Pennsylvania
- Known for: Father of SCAMC
- Scientific career
- Fields: Medical Informatics
- Workplaces: George Washington University, University of Utah, University of Alabama at Birmingham

Helmuth F. "Helly" Orthner (March 27, 1941 – March 16, 2009) was a pioneering American scientist in the field of medical informatics. He was one of the founders of the Symposium on Computer Applications in Medical Care (SCAMC), which later grew into the American Medical Informatics Association. He was a Fellow of the American College of Medical Informatics.
