= Pitze =

Pitze Pitzbach
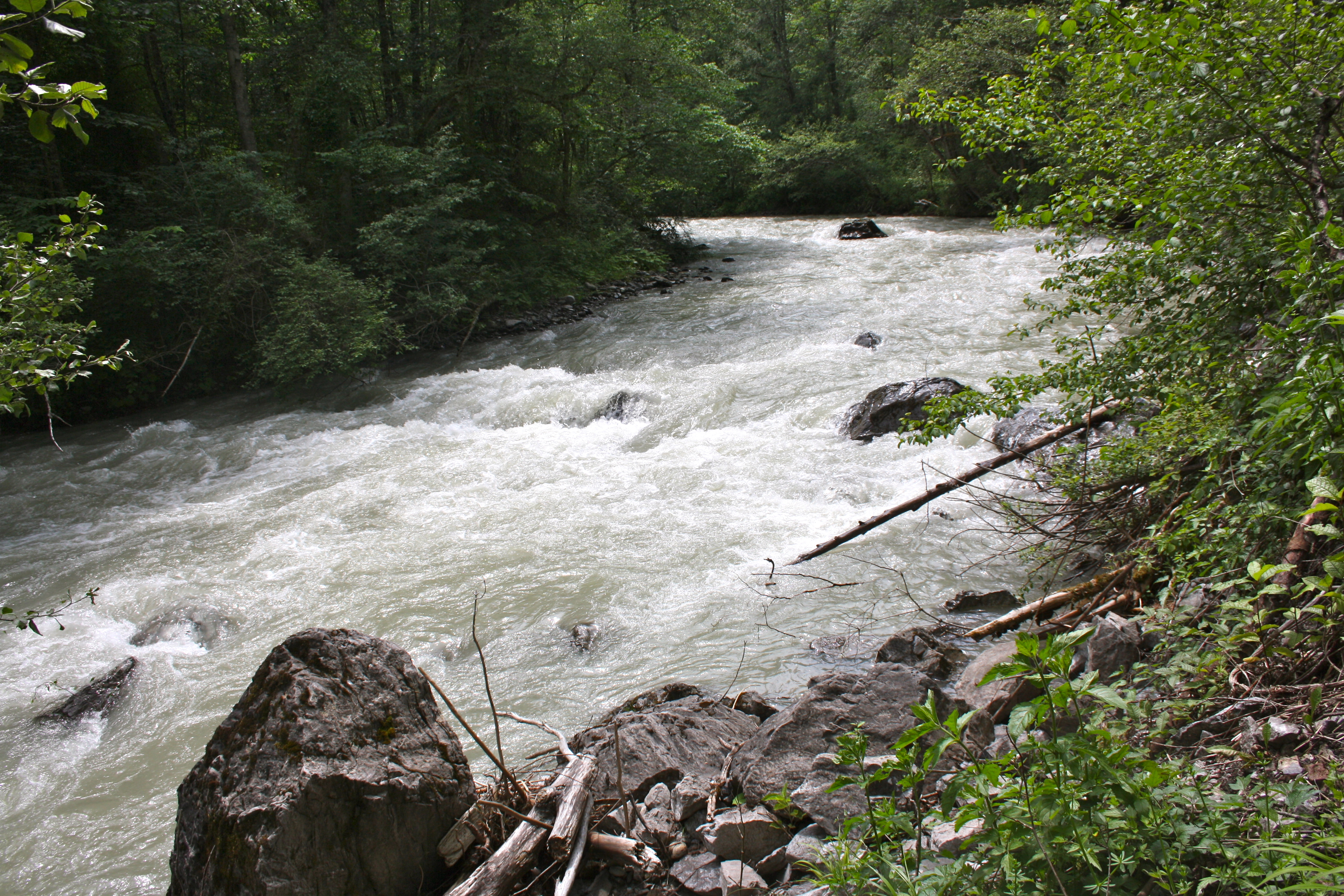
- Pitze in Arzl im Pitztal

Location
- Country: Austria
- State: Tyrol

Physical characteristics
- Source
  - location: Tyrol
  - coordinates: 46.9326°N 10.9014°E
- Mouth
  - location: Inn
  - coordinates: 47.2134°N 10.7797°E
  - elevation: 700 m (2,300 ft)
- Length: 41 km (25 mi)
- Basin size: 308 km^{2} (119 sq mi)

Basin features
- Progression: Inn→ Danube→ Black Sea

The Pitze (also: Pitzbach) is a river in the Imst district, Tyrol, Austria, a right tributary of the river Inn.

The Pitze flows through the Pitztal valley, a southern branch of the Inntal. It has a length of about 41 kilometres (25 mi), and its basin area is 308 km^{2} (119 sq mi). It merges with the Inn 3 kilometres (1.9 mi) east of the city of Imst at an elevation of 700 metres (2,300 ft).
