= Arzl im Pitztal =

- Municipality
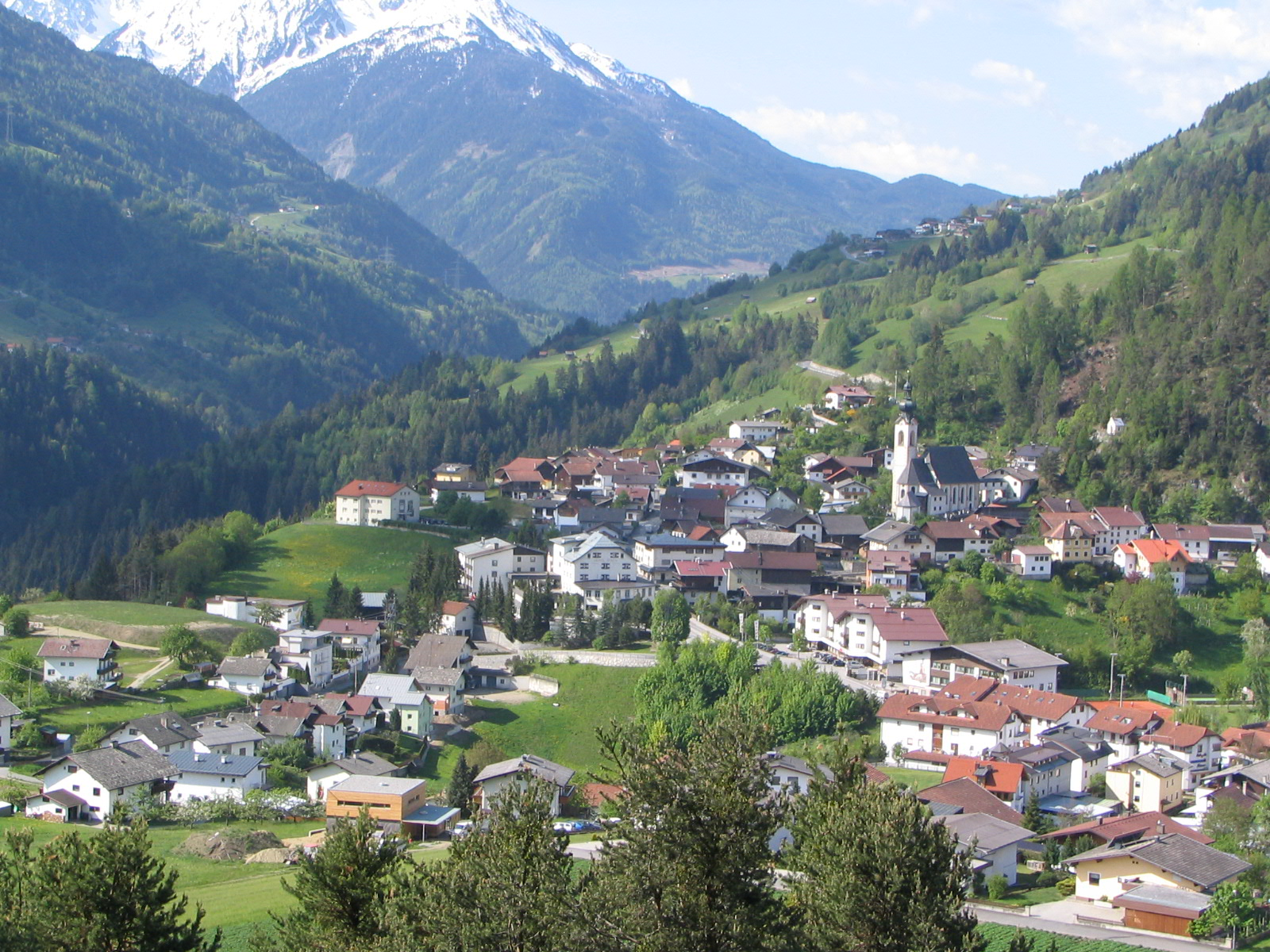
- Arzl im Pitztal

- Coat of arms

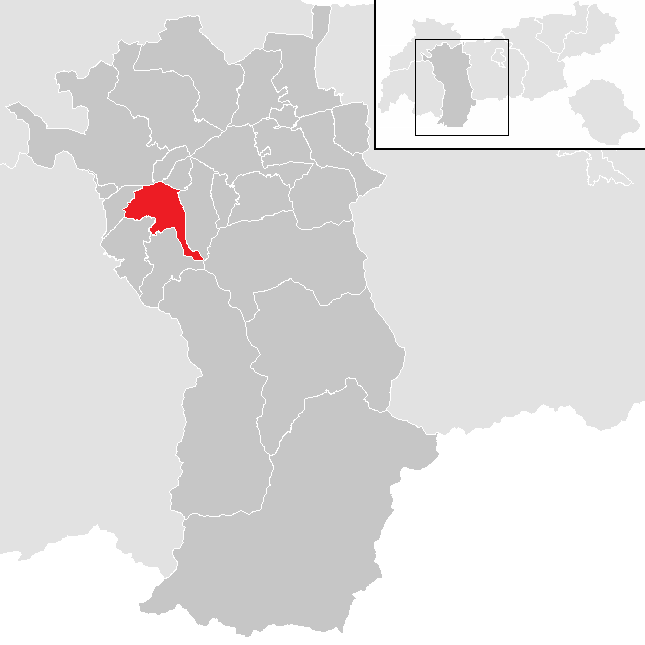
- Location in the district

- Location within Austria Arzl im Pitztal (Tyrol, Austria)
- Coordinates: 47°12′30″N 10°45′45″E
- Country: Austria
- State: Tyrol
- District: Imst

Government
  - Mayor: Josef Knabl (Bürgermeisterliste)

Area
  - Total: 29.37 km^{2} (11.34 sq mi)
- Elevation: 880 m (2,890 ft)

Population (2021)
  - Total: 3,140
  - Density: 107/km^{2} (277/sq mi)
- Time zone: UTC+1 (CET)
  - Summer (DST): UTC+2 (CEST)
- Postal code: 6471
- Area code: 05412
- Vehicle registration: IM
- Website: www.arzl-pitztal.tirol.gv.at

Arzl im Pitztal is a municipality and a town in the district of Imst in the Austrian state of Tyrol.

== Geography ==
The stream Pitze flows through the municipality.

== Population ==
Historical population

Year	Pop.	±%
1869	1,425	—
1880	1,395	−2.1%
1890	1,307	−6.3%
1900	1,241	−5.0%
1910	1,243	+0.2%
1923	1,247	+0.3%
1934	1,353	+8.5%
1939	1,380	+2.0%
1951	1,604	+16.2%

Year	Pop.	±%
1961	1,802	+12.3%
1971	2,111	+17.1%
1981	2,316	+9.7%
1991	2,530	+9.2%
2001	2,783	+10.0%
2011	2,969	+6.7%
2016	3,042	+2.5%
2017	3,088	+1.5%

== Personalities ==
The professional skier Benjamin Raich and the band Mother's Cake come from the village.
