= Imst =

Imst Imscht
- Municipality
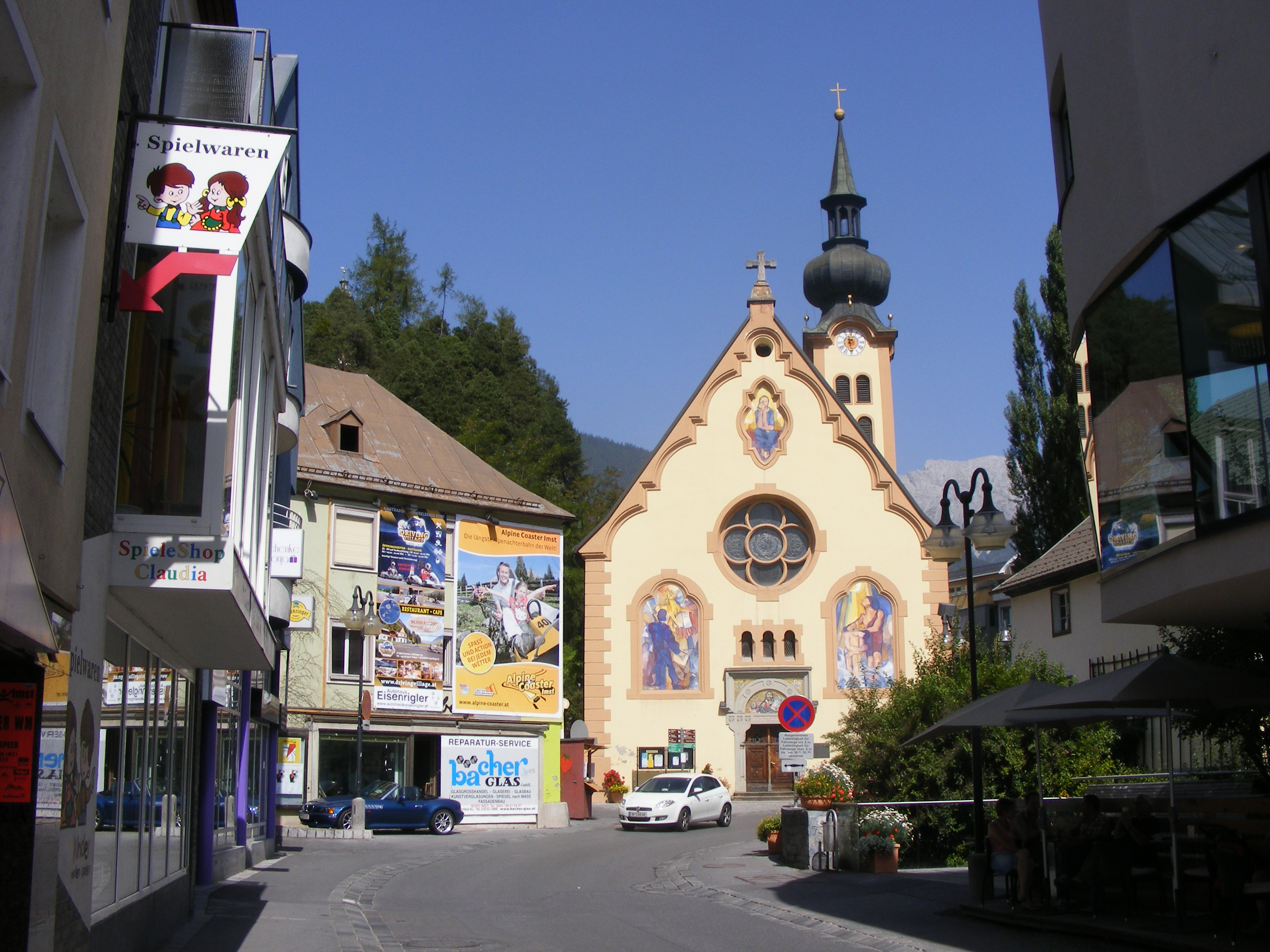
- Saint John's Church in Imst in August 2011

- Coat of arms

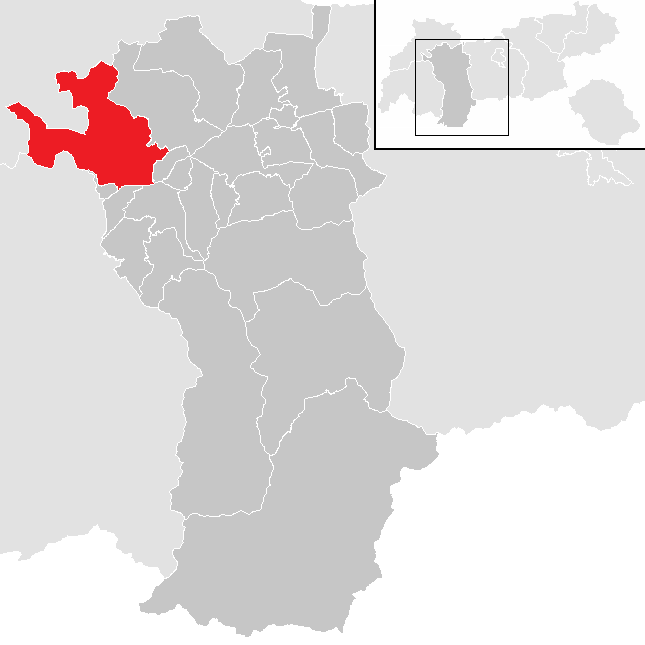
- Location in the district

- Location within Austria
- Coordinates: 47°14′22″N 10°44′17″E
- Country: Austria
- State: Tyrol
- District: Imst

Government
  - Mayor: Stefan Weirather

Area
  - Total: 113.39 km^{2} (43.78 sq mi)
- Elevation: 827 m (2,713 ft)

Population (2021-01-01)
  - Total: 10,882
  - Density: 95.970/km^{2} (248.56/sq mi)
- Time zone: UTC+1 (CET)
  - Summer (DST): UTC+2 (CEST)
- Postal code: 6460
- Area code: 05412
- Vehicle registration: IM
- Website: www.imst.tirol.gv.at

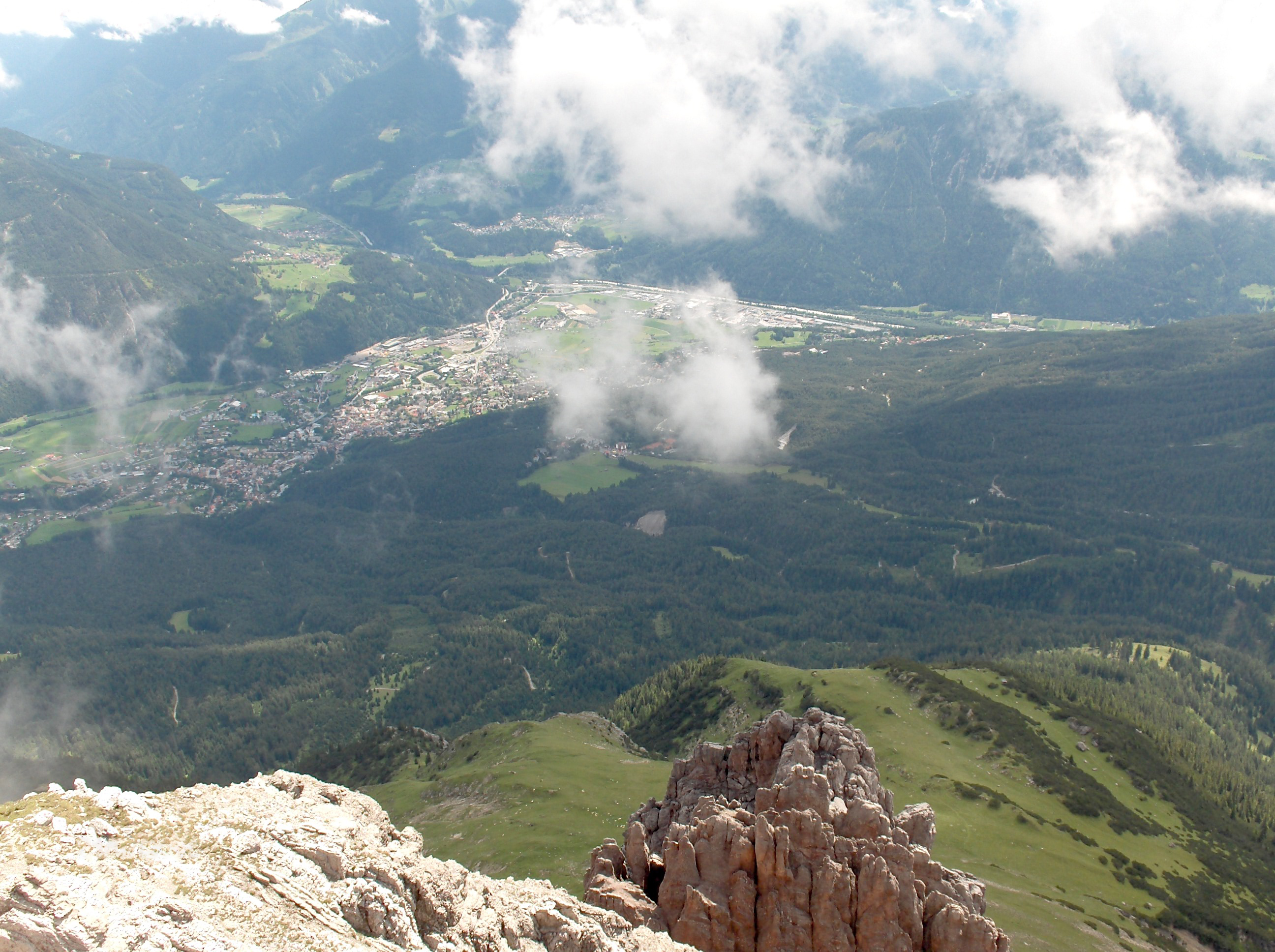
Imst seen from the Vordere Platteinspitze (2565 m)

Imst (German: [ɪmst]; Southern Bavarian: Imscht) is a town in the Austrian federal state of Tyrol. It lies on the River Inn in western Tyrol, some 50 kilometres (31 miles) west of Innsbruck and at an altitude of 828 metres (2,717 feet) above sea level. With a current population (2018) of 10,504, Imst is the administrative centre of Imst District.

== History ==
Licensed since 1282 to hold a regular market. Until 1918, the town (named earlier also JMST) was part of the Austrian monarchy (Austria side after the compromise of 1867), head of the district of the same name, one of the 21 Bezirkshauptmannschaften in the Tyrol province.

Imst received full town rights in 1898.

=== Schemenlaufen ===
Every four years Imst hosts their Fasnacht, or carnival before Lent. This carnival is listed by UNESCO as one of their Lists of Intangible Cultural Heritage. As part of Schemenlaufen pairs of men wear bells, tuned differently, while performing dances of jumps and bows. They are accompanied by masked characters imitating their dance.

== Luge track ==
In 1958, the first artificially refrigerated luge track was completed at Imst. The track was 1,000.9 meters (3,284 ft) long with 17 turns and a vertical drop of 124.8 meters (409 ft), giving the track an average grade of 12.48%. No turn names were given for the track.

It hosted the FIL World Luge Championships in 1963 and 1978 and it hosted the FIL European Luge Championships in 1956, 1971, and 1974.

== SOS Children's Village ==
In 1949, Hermann Gmeiner founded the first SOS Children's Village in the Sonnberg district of Imst. The SOS-Kinderdörfer organization now runs over 450 such villages worldwide.

== Climate ==
Climate data for Imst (1971–2000)
Month	Jan	Feb	Mar	Apr	May	Jun	Jul	Aug	Sep	Oct	Nov	Dec	Year
Record high °C (°F)	17.0 (62.6)	17.0 (62.6)	22.0 (71.6)	25.0 (77.0)	33.0 (91.4)	34.1 (93.4)	34.6 (94.3)	33.7 (92.7)	30.2 (86.4)	25.3 (77.5)	21.0 (69.8)	17.0 (62.6)	34.6 (94.3)
Mean daily maximum °C (°F)	1.9 (35.4)	4.8 (40.6)	10.0 (50.0)	13.4 (56.1)	18.9 (66.0)	21.3 (70.3)	23.6 (74.5)	23.3 (73.9)	19.4 (66.9)	14.4 (57.9)	6.5 (43.7)	2.2 (36.0)	13.3 (55.9)
Daily mean °C (°F)	−2.8 (27.0)	−1.1 (30.0)	3.1 (37.6)	6.6 (43.9)	11.9 (53.4)	14.6 (58.3)	16.6 (61.9)	16.1 (61.0)	12.3 (54.1)	7.5 (45.5)	1.4 (34.5)	−2.0 (28.4)	7.0 (44.6)
Mean daily minimum °C (°F)	−6.1 (21.0)	−5.0 (23.0)	−1.5 (29.3)	1.4 (34.5)	6.0 (42.8)	9.1 (48.4)	11.1 (52.0)	10.9 (51.6)	7.6 (45.7)	3.2 (37.8)	−2.0 (28.4)	−5.1 (22.8)	2.5 (36.5)
Record low °C (°F)	−22.0 (−7.6)	−18.2 (−0.8)	−19.8 (−3.6)	−7.1 (19.2)	−5.4 (22.3)	0.6 (33.1)	3.5 (38.3)	2.0 (35.6)	−3.3 (26.1)	−7.5 (18.5)	−19.6 (−3.3)	−21.4 (−6.5)	−22.0 (−7.6)
Average precipitation mm (inches)	45.4 (1.79)	43.4 (1.71)	46.3 (1.82)	37.6 (1.48)	63.2 (2.49)	93.3 (3.67)	116.6 (4.59)	116.9 (4.60)	69.0 (2.72)	47.6 (1.87)	55.6 (2.19)	54.0 (2.13)	788.9 (31.06)
Average snowfall cm (inches)	19.0 (7.5)	24.0 (9.4)	9.1 (3.6)	1.8 (0.7)	0.0 (0.0)	0.0 (0.0)	0.0 (0.0)	0.0 (0.0)	0.0 (0.0)	0.2 (0.1)	8.6 (3.4)	15.6 (6.1)	78.3 (30.8)
Average precipitation days (≥ 1.0 mm)	7.1	6.2	8.0	7.4	10.7	13.5	13.4	13.8	9.5	7.3	8.6	8.7	114.2
Average relative humidity (%) (at 14:00)	67.0	55.3	44.0	42.0	42.9	46.7	48.1	49.9	51.3	53.8	64.7	72.3	53.2
Mean monthly sunshine hours	77.9	112.3	140.8	138.4	167.3	167.0	179.1	185.7	165.2	145.9	95.0	78.6	1,653.2
Percentage possible sunshine	36.5	47.9	47.4	43.3	46.3	44.9	47.9	53.7	54.4	52.0	41.5	43.1	46.6
Source: Central Institute for Meteorology and Geodynamics

== Sons and daughters of the town ==
- Theodor von Hörmann (1840–1895), landscape painter
- Friedrich Heinrich Suso Denifle (1844–1905), church historian, Dominican, professor in Graz
- Alfons Gorbach (1898–1972), politician (ÖVP), Federal Chancellor of Austria from 1961 to 1964

== Notes and references ==
- Official Imst town council website (in German)
- Imst-Gurgltal tourist site
- Website of SOS-Kinderdorf international
