= Serfaus =

Municipality in Tyrol, Austria

- Municipality
- Coat of arms

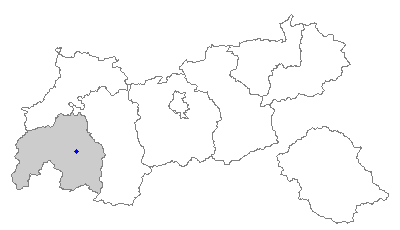
- Location within Tyrol

- Location within Austria
- Coordinates: 47°02′19″N 10°36′21″E
- Country: Austria
- State: Tyrol
- District: Landeck

Government
  - Mayor: Paul Greiter

Area
  - Total: 59.67 km^{2} (23.04 sq mi)
- Elevation: 1,429 m (4,688 ft)

Population (2025)
  - Total: 1,212
  - Density: 20.31/km^{2} (52.61/sq mi)
- Time zone: UTC+1 (CET)
  - Summer (DST): UTC+2 (CEST)
- Postal code: 6534
- Area code: 05476
- Vehicle registration: LA
- Website: www.serfaus.gv.at

Serfaus is a municipality in the district of Landeck in the Austrian state of Tyrol. It is well known as part of the ski-region "Serfaus-Fiss-Ladis", which was formed when Serfaus teamed up with the two nearby municipalities of Fiss and Ladis in 1999. Serfaus is also known for its small hovertrain subway system, the U-Bahn Serfaus. With four stations and a length of 1280 m (the second-shortest underground train line in the world) it allows for a complete ban of cars within the town, while at the same time maintaining the village's attractiveness to tourists, particularly skiers.

== Geography ==
Serfaus is a small town located on a plateau 500m above the upper Inn valley in Tyrol, western Austria. Above the town a high ridge rises, linking Mount Furgler (3004 metres above sea level) with Mount Schönjoch (2491m). On the opposite side of the valley is a 20 km-long ridge named Glockturmkamm with Pfroslkopf peak (3148m).

== History ==
The oldest evidence of civilisation in the region of Serfaus dates from the Bronze Age. The remains of a 3200-year-old fireplace on the Komperdell, a nearby high alpine meadow, indicates that the area was used as a pasture or hunting ground. More archaeological research was undertaken at the "Zienerbichl" (a distinctive hill in the south-west of Serfaus), revealing traces of the period Late Antiquity and from the Middle Ages.

Pre-Roman field names and some traces of the Celts bear witness to the early settlers of this region. Ancient historians described the area as Raetia and its inhabitants as Raeti. However, with the conquest of the area by the Romans in about 15 BC the Roman and Raetic cultures began to mix, creating the Romansh people. The Romansh language, which is still spoken in some parts of the Swiss Canton Graubünden, has survived in many of the regional field names. In the 6th century the German-speaking Bavarii started to inhabit the plateau, gradually displacing Romansh from everyday communication.

The village itself was first officially mentioned in the 11th century. The towns of See and Kappl in the Paznaun valley were partly settled via Serfaus. Up to 1891 See was also part of the rectory of Serfaus, which explains why there is still a graveyard for citizens of See in the village of Serfaus. Other important cultural landmarks include the pilgrimage church of St. Georgen. Built in the Middle Ages it is one of the oldest churches in the region.

During the 19th century tourism started to flourish in Tyrol and after the Second World War tourism became the main source of income for the village.

In 1942 fourteen houses were destroyed by a fire, which left 16 families (a total of 89 people) homeless and caused about 650,000 ℛ︁ℳ︁ worth of damage. The village was rebuilt after the Second World War, also allowing the new buildings more space in contrast to the old layout of a clustered Romansh village.

To cope with the increased traffic due to growing tourism in the region, Serfaus banned private traffic in winter in the 1970s. For the transportation of guests (and especially skiers) a bus service was established. In order to provide an even quieter and more environmentally friendly means of transportation from the entrance of the town through to the cable-car station, the small underground train system, the Dorfbahn Serfaus went into operation in 1985. The use of the underground is free-of-charge and along its 1280m-long route it has four stops (Parkplatz, Kirche, Zentrum (formerly named Raika), Seilbahn) and can transport up to 1500 people per hour.

== Demographics ==
As of January 2020, 1,139 people live in Serfaus. 88.3% are citizens of Austria. More than 90% of the population is Roman Catholic (statistics from 2019). Small minority religions are Protestantism, Eastern Orthodoxy and Islam.

== Underground railway Serfaus ==
The U-Bahn Serfaus is an underground air cushion funicular people mover system. It is one of the smallest underground railways in the world.

== Tourism ==
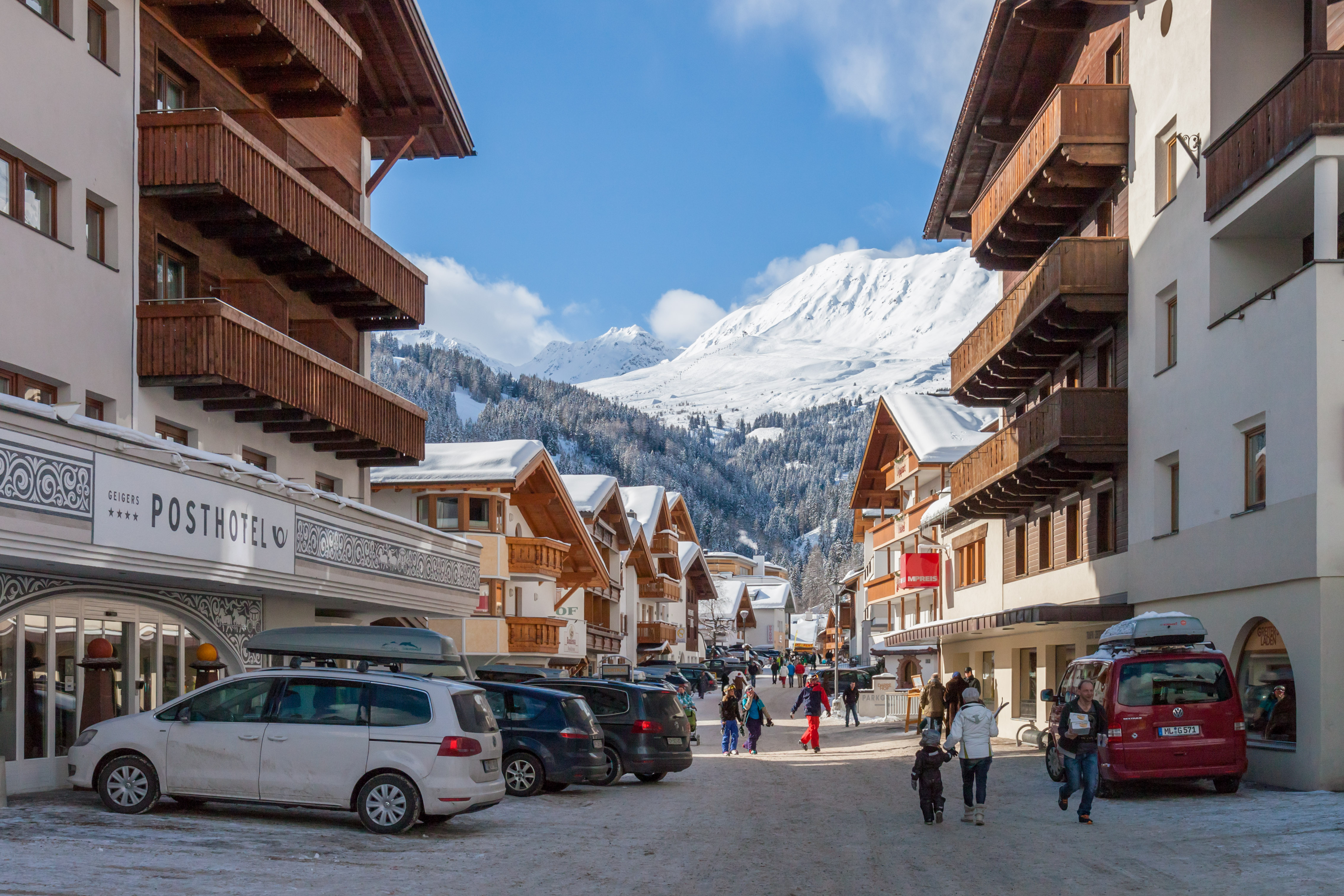
Serfaus main street

As Serfaus is close to the Via Claudia Augusta and the Reschen Pass people are thought to have traveled through the area for hundreds of years. Moreover, the marian pilgrimage, which has been taking place since the Middle Ages, has caused some travel to and from the mountain village. The Theresian Cadasdre of 1776 lists Johannes Penz as having the "right to operate a tavern". By 1812 the inhabitants of Serfaus were asked to pay an extra tax for the lodging of foreigners in their taverns or private rooms. This shows that tourism was already present at these times, even if still only in its most basic form.

Shortly after 1900 skiers started to discover the possibilities of the region and in 1912 plans were made to build a little ski hut on one of the high alpine meadows surrounding the village, the "Kölnerhaus" up at the "Komperdell". However, during the First World War and the following 1920s tourism developed very slowly. Tourism between the two world wars reached its peak in 1931/32 with 30,000 registered guests. As a result, the three taverns could not provide enough accommodation anymore and farmers started to rent out private rooms to guests in the region. Thus Serfaus had 150 registered beds in 1930. In 1940 a cable-car for transporting goods to the "Kölnerhaus" was installed and was turned into an aerial tramway seating five people in 1951. This caused a new increase of tourism in Serfaus and through the constant renewal and expansion of the infrastructure and the connection to the lifts of Fiss-Ladis the ski area now covers 190 km of pistes through 70 lifts. Today the town is one of the most popular ski and holiday areas in Tyrol.
