= Felix Eisengräber =

German painter (1874–1940)

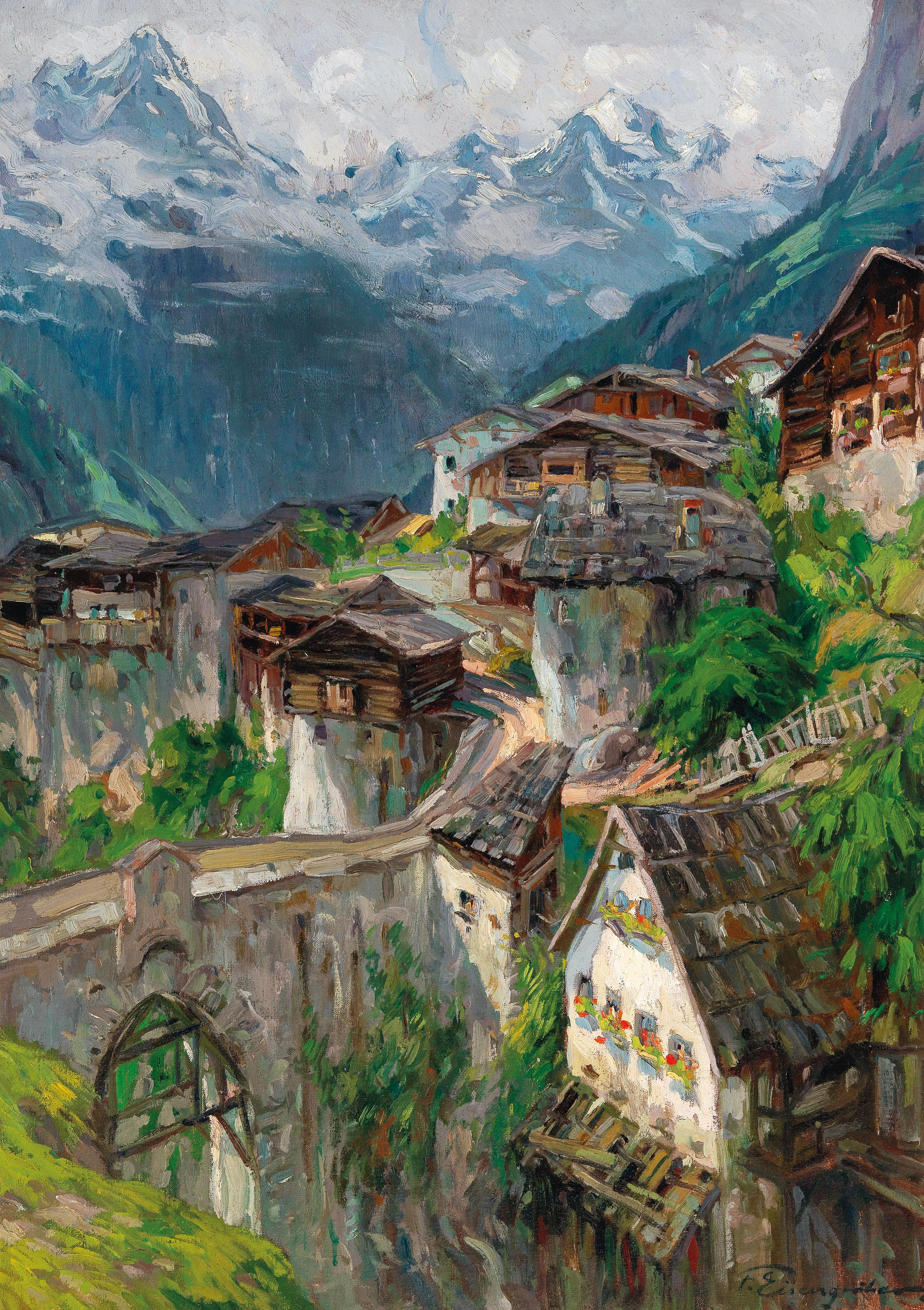
View of Grins, Near Landeck, in Tyrol

Karl Felix Eisengräber (7 March 1874 – 29 April 1940) was a German painter.

He was born in Leipzig and began his studies at the Leipzig Academy of Art, after which he studied at the Academy of Fine Arts, Munich under Ludwig von Herterich and Paul Hoecker. After the death of Anton Ažbe, he and Paul Weinhold continued Ažbe's school of art until 1913. He was a member of the Luitpold Group, which had split off from the Munich Artists' Association, and of a group called The Independents (Die Unabhängigen).

After World War I, by arrangement with Springer Verlag, Eisengräber provided the illustrations for new editions of medical books by Ferdinand Sauerbruch. He died in 1940 in Munich.

== Sources ==
- Galerie von Zezschwitz
