= Kaunertal =

Municipality in Tyrol, Austria

- Municipality

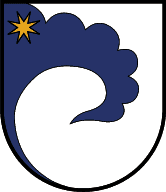
- Coat of arms

- Location within Austria
- Coordinates: 47°02′00″N 10°45′00″E
- Country: Austria
- State: Tyrol
- District: Landeck

Government
  - Mayor: Josef Raich

Area
  - Total: 193.52 km^{2} (74.72 sq mi)
- Elevation: 1,287 m (4,222 ft)

Population (2021-01-01)
  - Total: 616
  - Density: 3.18/km^{2} (8.24/sq mi)
- Time zone: UTC+1 (CET)
  - Summer (DST): UTC+2 (CEST)
- Postal code: 6524
- Area code: 05475
- Vehicle registration: LA
- Website: www.kaunertal.eu

The Kaunertal is a municipality and alpine valley in the Landeck district in the Austrian state of Tyrol. The municipality is located about 15 km (9.3 mi) southeast of Landeck at the upper course of the Inn river.

The Kaunertal valley is 28 km (17 mi) in length and runs southeast from the town of Prutz (884 m) to the Kaunertal Glacier. The valley is traversed by the Faggenbach river, which rises south of the Weißseespitze mountain (3044 m) and flows into the Inn river at Prutz (884 m), the site of a hydroelectric power station. The Gepatsch Reservoir (Gepatsch Stausee), which is located on the upper course of the Fagge river, is 6 km (3.7 mi) in length, has a capacity of 138,000,000 m^{3}, and is formed by a rockfill dam that is 630 m (2,070 ft) long and 130 m (430 ft) high. The dam was constructed in 1961. Water from the lake is used to generate electricity through a pipe system 13 km (8.1 mi) in length, located at the south end of the Kaunertal. The generator facility at Prutz produces 620 million kilowatt hours per year. The lake surface is at an altitude of 1,820 m (5,970 ft).

The main town in the valley is Kauns (1050 m), located near the Inn river, with its Schranz Chapel containing the Kauner Kreuz. The Kaunertal Glacier Road continues up to the Weißenseeferner glacier. This toll road is the fifth highest paved road in the Alps and reaches an elevation of 2750 m (9025 ft). With 29 180-degree turns, the road leads all the way to the base of the ski area at 2,750 m (9,020 ft). The main source of income is this glacier ski area with 35 km (22 mi) slopes and 10 lifts, which was opened in 1982. Due to the ski area's elevation of 2,200–3,050 m (7,220–10,010 ft), and the glacier, it is operational from mid-October to mid-June.

The ruins of the thirteenth-century Bernegg Castle with its Gothic chapel are also located in the valley.

== Economy and Infrastructure ==
Originally, the primary sources of livelihood in the valley were agriculture and forestry. Agriculture consisted mainly of livestock farming as the valley is situated at too high an altitude for crop cultivation but this sector has declined significantly over the last 60 years. While there were 63 farms in the valley in 1960, that number had fallen to 39 by 2020, with the sharpest decline occurring between 2010 and 2020. Of these, only 5 are operated as full-time agricultural businesses, 4 are held by legal entities, and 30 are run as part-time operations. Only 8 individuals are employed full-time as farmers across these operations. The municipality began to experience a gradual economic upturn in the late 1950s, driven by the emergence of tourism. In 1961, only 47 people were employed in the service sector with just 22 of those working in hotels and restaurants whereas by 2022, this figure had reached 242.

Consequently, the employment structure in the valley has shifted completely. In 1981, there were 37,537 overnight stays by guests. This figure rose steadily to 147,582 by 2001 and has remained at that level ever since, with the exception of a brief decline in 2021 due to the COVID-19 pandemic.

As of 2022, 14 people are employed in the trade and construction sectors.

== Notable people ==
- Alexander Van der Bellen (born 1944), President of Austria

== See also ==
- List of mountain passes
