= Pettneu am Arlberg =

Municipality in Tyrol, Austria

- Municipality
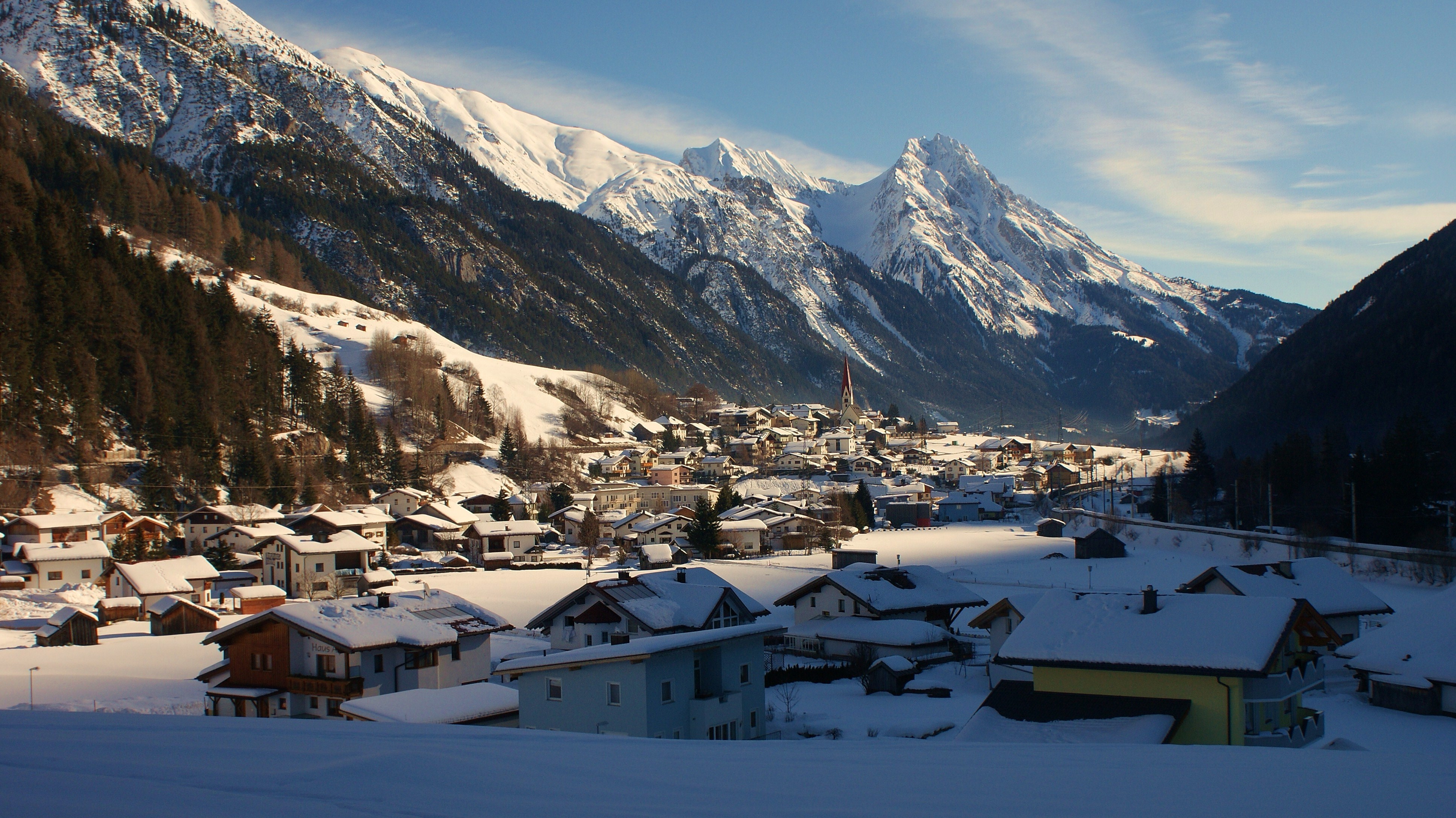
- View of Pettneu

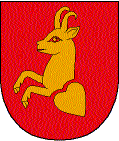
- Coat of arms

- Location within Austria
- Coordinates: 47°08′54″N 10°20′30″E
- Country: Austria
- State: Tyrol
- District: Landeck

Government
  - Mayor: Manfred Matt (ÖVP)

Area
  - Total: 56.8 km^{2} (21.9 sq mi)
- Elevation: 1,222 m (4,009 ft)

Population (2018-01-01)
  - Total: 1,494
  - Density: 26.3/km^{2} (68.1/sq mi)
- Time zone: UTC+1 (CET)
  - Summer (DST): UTC+2 (CEST)
- Postal code: 6574
- Area code: 05448
- Vehicle registration: LA
- Website: www.pettneu.tirol.gv.at

Pettneu am Arlberg is a municipality in the district of Landeck in the Austrian state of Tyrol. It is located 16.3 km west of the city of Landeck. The location was first mentioned in 1300 as Ponte novu (nou) which means new bridge. The main sources of income are summer and winter tourism and agriculture.
