= Galtür =

Place in Tyrol, Austria

- Municipality
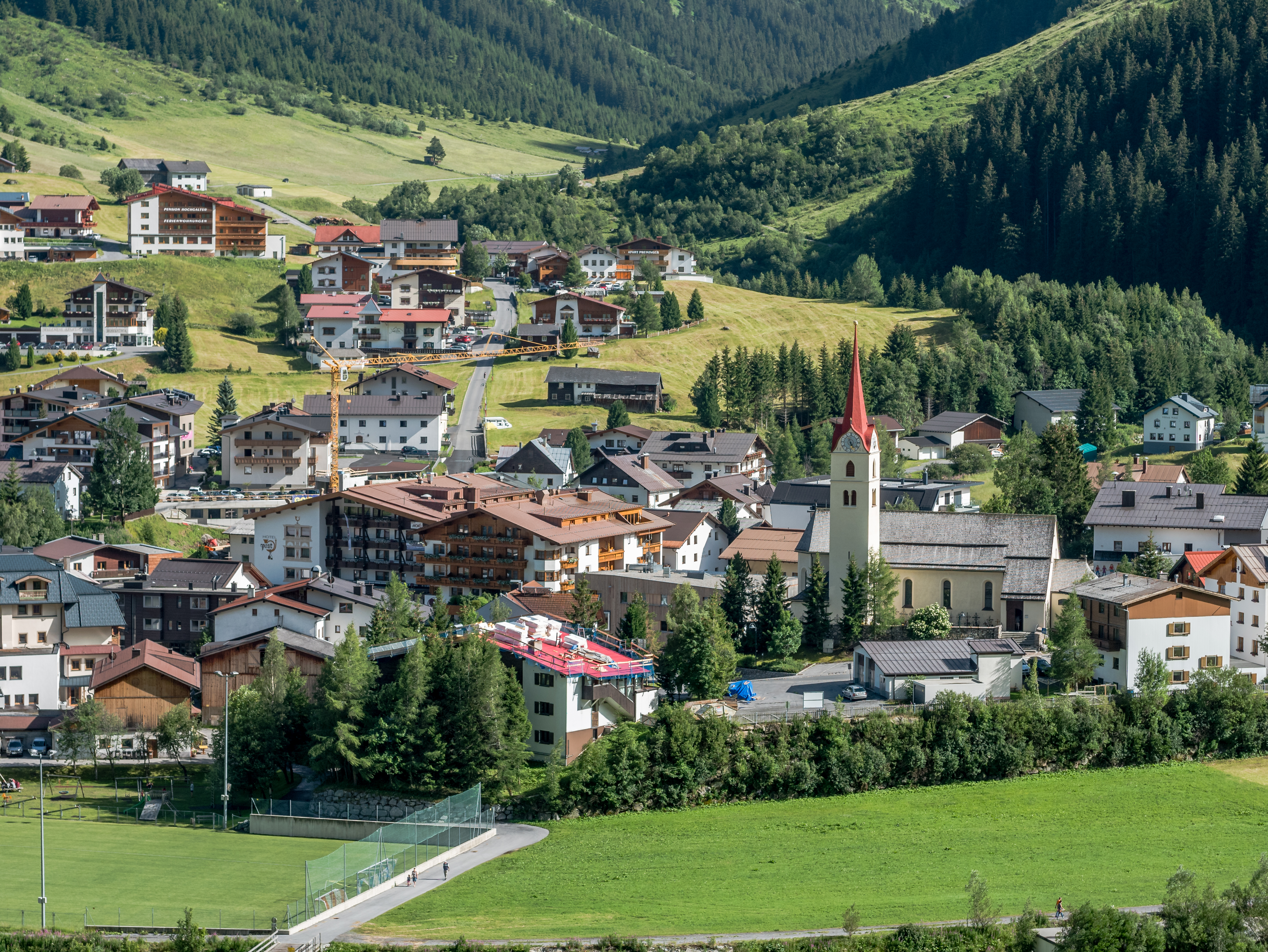

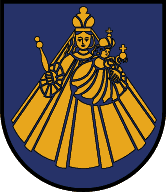
- Coat of arms

- Location within Austria
- Coordinates: 46°58′05″N 10°11′15″E
- Country: Austria
- State: Tyrol
- District: Landeck

Government
  - Mayor: Anton Mattle

Area
  - Total: 121.23 km^{2} (46.81 sq mi)
- Elevation: 1,584 m (5,197 ft)

Population (2018-01-01)
  - Total: 765
  - Density: 6.31/km^{2} (16.3/sq mi)
- Time zone: UTC+1 (CET)
  - Summer (DST): UTC+2 (CEST)
- Postal code: 6563
- Area code: 05443
- Vehicle registration: LA
- Website: www.galtuer.gv.at

Galtür is a village and ski resort in the upper Paznaun valley in Austrian state of Tyrol located in the Central Eastern Alps 35 km southwest of Landeck near the border of Vorarlberg and Switzerland.

== Ski Resort ==
Galtür is a popular tourist destination in winter. There are 40 km (25 mi) of perfectly prepared pistes and a varied selection of slopes to explore. Galtür is a family-friendly ski area. Most ski slopes range from easy to medium difficulty. In addition, ski pros find challenging runs and many deep snow slopes without any tracks. There are 10 mountain railways and lifts, including the eight-seater Alpkogel gondola. Wednesday evenings, night skiing is possible on a floodlit piste.

Galtür's ski resort is called Silvapark and is located 2 kilometres outside the main village in the small village of Wirl. Ski buses run along the main road through Galtür between the ski area and other destinations in the valley, including Ischgl, Kappl, and See. There are stops in Galtür at the Hotel Alpenrose, Dorfplatz, and Alpinarium, as well as one stop next to the Birkhahnbahn chair lift in Wirl. In Wirl, skiers and snowboarders can take either the Birkahahnbahn chair lift or the Alpkogelbahn Gondola up onto the mountain.

Silvapark offers 40 km of groomed pistes served by 3 chair lifts, 1 gondola and 5 smaller tow lifts. Many of the runs are marked Blue and Red, making the resort accessible to families and beginners. In addition to these, the resort also offers a number of more difficult Red and Black runs, which means, coupled with the off piste possibilities, the resort caters for more advanced skiers and snowboarders too. Off piste opportunities through trees and between runs, particularly surrounding the Breitspitzbahn chair lift, are available, even for less experienced skiers. This area is much quieter and has better on-piste conditions.

There are several mountain huts and restaurants on the mountain which offer traditional Austrian cuisine and a friendly atmosphere. Most offer indoor and outdoor dining areas as well as smoking and non-smoking areas respectively. At the bottom of the Alpkogelbahn Gondola, there are a number of hotels which have ski in ski out facilities. These hotels offer accommodation and facilities for those who would rather not take a ski bus.

== Climate ==
Climate data for Galtür: 1587m (1991−2020 normals)
Month	Jan	Feb	Mar	Apr	May	Jun	Jul	Aug	Sep	Oct	Nov	Dec	Year
Record high °C (°F)	9.9 (49.8)	12.5 (54.5)	15.3 (59.5)	19.3 (66.7)	24.5 (76.1)	30.3 (86.5)	29.6 (85.3)	28.1 (82.6)	24.6 (76.3)	23.1 (73.6)	16.4 (61.5)	11.5 (52.7)	30.3 (86.5)
Mean daily maximum °C (°F)	−0.5 (31.1)	0.7 (33.3)	4.1 (39.4)	8.3 (46.9)	12.9 (55.2)	17.1 (62.8)	18.4 (65.1)	18.0 (64.4)	14.6 (58.3)	10.3 (50.5)	3.9 (39.0)	0.1 (32.2)	9.0 (48.2)
Daily mean °C (°F)	−4.7 (23.5)	−4.1 (24.6)	−0.5 (31.1)	3.3 (37.9)	7.9 (46.2)	11.4 (52.5)	13.3 (55.9)	13.1 (55.6)	9.3 (48.7)	5.6 (42.1)	−0.1 (31.8)	−3.9 (25.0)	4.2 (39.6)
Mean daily minimum °C (°F)	−8.6 (16.5)	−9.4 (15.1)	−5.4 (22.3)	−1.7 (28.9)	2.4 (36.3)	5.7 (42.3)	7.3 (45.1)	7.3 (45.1)	4.0 (39.2)	0.5 (32.9)	−4.1 (24.6)	−7.5 (18.5)	−0.8 (30.6)
Record low °C (°F)	−23.6 (−10.5)	−26.5 (−15.7)	−25.6 (−14.1)	−17.9 (−0.2)	−9.5 (14.9)	−3.7 (25.3)	−0.6 (30.9)	−1.1 (30.0)	−6.7 (19.9)	−15.1 (4.8)	−20.9 (−5.6)	−24.2 (−11.6)	−26.5 (−15.7)
Average precipitation mm (inches)	50.0 (1.97)	39.9 (1.57)	49.8 (1.96)	39.9 (1.57)	75.2 (2.96)	113.6 (4.47)	128.4 (5.06)	141.7 (5.58)	84.5 (3.33)	62.4 (2.46)	53.0 (2.09)	52.3 (2.06)	890.7 (35.08)
Average snowfall cm (inches)	87.9 (34.6)	92.7 (36.5)	80.2 (31.6)	57.1 (22.5)	13.0 (5.1)	3.2 (1.3)	0.3 (0.1)	0.7 (0.3)	7.2 (2.8)	28.3 (11.1)	69.4 (27.3)	91.3 (35.9)	531.3 (209.1)
Average precipitation days (≥ 1.0 mm)	8.1	7.0	9.1	9.3	12.5	14.3	14.6	14.8	11.1	8.9	9.0	9.1	127.8
Average snowy days (≥ 1 cm)	30.9	28.3	30.3	20.8	3.4	0.4	0.0	0.1	1.4	5.8	17.8	28.4	167.6
Source: Central Institute for Meteorology and Geodynamics

Climate data for Galtür (1971–2000)
Month	Jan	Feb	Mar	Apr	May	Jun	Jul	Aug	Sep	Oct	Nov	Dec	Year
Record high °C (°F)	10.0 (50.0)	11.4 (52.5)	17.0 (62.6)	17.8 (64.0)	23.4 (74.1)	25.6 (78.1)	29.6 (85.3)	29.4 (84.9)	26.6 (79.9)	21.2 (70.2)	16.4 (61.5)	12.1 (53.8)	29.6 (85.3)
Mean daily maximum °C (°F)	−0.3 (31.5)	0.6 (33.1)	3.6 (38.5)	6.3 (43.3)	12.3 (54.1)	15.2 (59.4)	17.8 (64.0)	17.6 (63.7)	14.6 (58.3)	10.5 (50.9)	3.3 (37.9)	0.3 (32.5)	8.5 (47.3)
Daily mean °C (°F)	−5.5 (22.1)	−5.3 (22.5)	−2.1 (28.2)	1.0 (33.8)	6.4 (43.5)	9.3 (48.7)	11.7 (53.1)	11.4 (52.5)	7.9 (46.2)	3.9 (39.0)	−1.9 (28.6)	−4.5 (23.9)	2.7 (36.9)
Mean daily minimum °C (°F)	−9.5 (14.9)	−9.6 (14.7)	−6.2 (20.8)	−3.1 (26.4)	1.4 (34.5)	4.1 (39.4)	6.3 (43.3)	6.4 (43.5)	3.3 (37.9)	−0.3 (31.5)	−5.7 (21.7)	−8.3 (17.1)	−1.8 (28.8)
Record low °C (°F)	−29.4 (−20.9)	−25.0 (−13.0)	−27.5 (−17.5)	−16.4 (2.5)	−13.3 (8.1)	−5.0 (23.0)	−2.6 (27.3)	−3.6 (25.5)	−6.8 (19.8)	−16.0 (3.2)	−22.5 (−8.5)	−26.5 (−15.7)	−29.4 (−20.9)
Average precipitation mm (inches)	78.9 (3.11)	62.9 (2.48)	74.4 (2.93)	65.4 (2.57)	87.6 (3.45)	134.9 (5.31)	156.2 (6.15)	142.7 (5.62)	100.0 (3.94)	67.1 (2.64)	80.2 (3.16)	77.2 (3.04)	1,127.5 (44.39)
Average snowfall cm (inches)	89.5 (35.2)	103.4 (40.7)	96.8 (38.1)	74.5 (29.3)	15.2 (6.0)	4.5 (1.8)	0.6 (0.2)	1.1 (0.4)	6.0 (2.4)	18.1 (7.1)	68.8 (27.1)	90.8 (35.7)	569.3 (224.1)
Average precipitation days (≥ 1.0 mm)	10.3	8.5	11.2	11.8	12.6	14.8	15.3	14.1	10.8	9.1	10.2	10.7	139.4
Average relative humidity (%) (at 14:00)	63.1	60.0	56.4	56.3	52.2	55.3	53.9	55.4	53.4	54.1	64.1	66.3	57.5
Source: Central Institute for Meteorology and Geodynamics

== Gallery ==
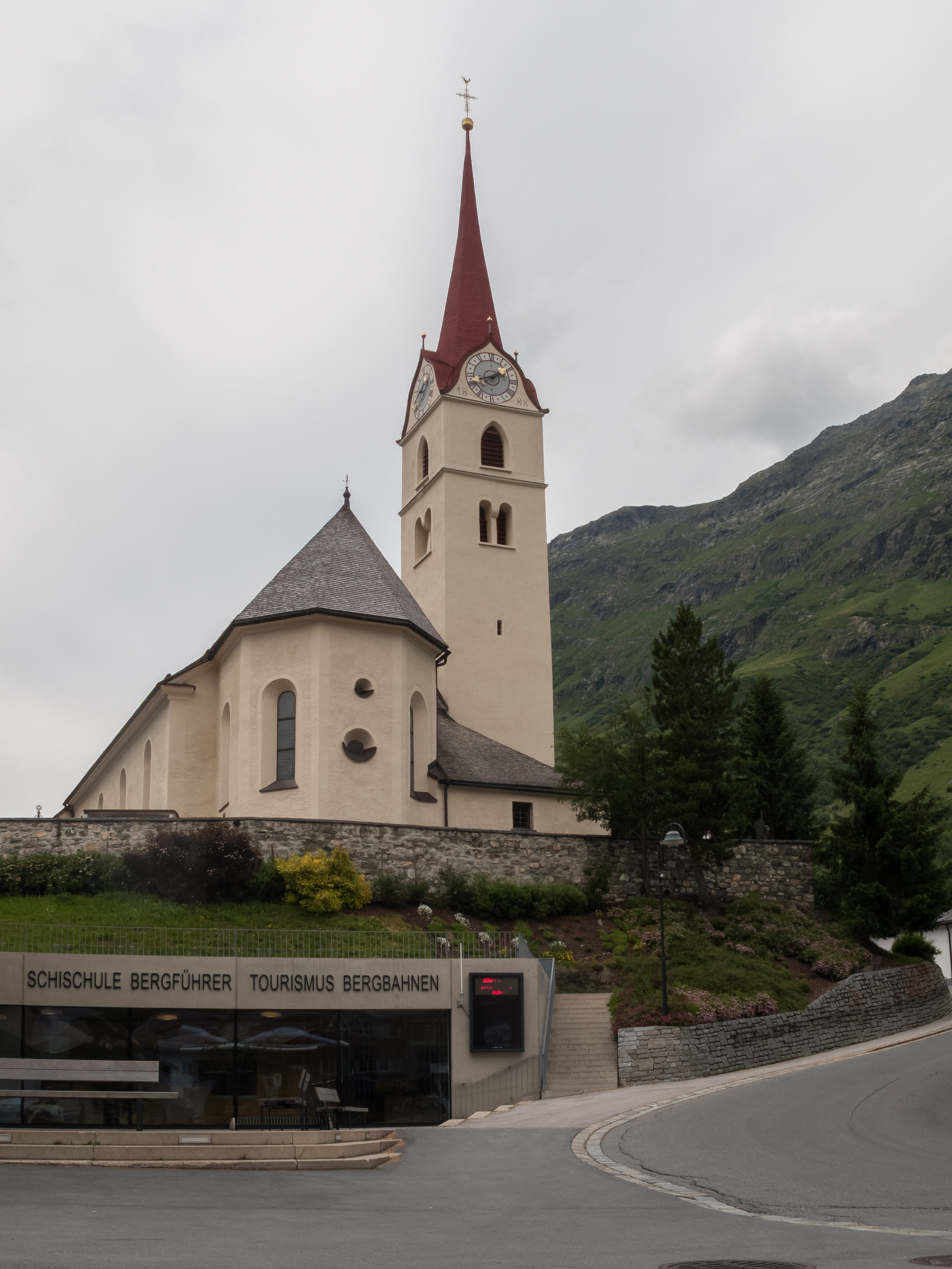
Wallfahrtskirche Mariä Geburtstag Catholic parish church

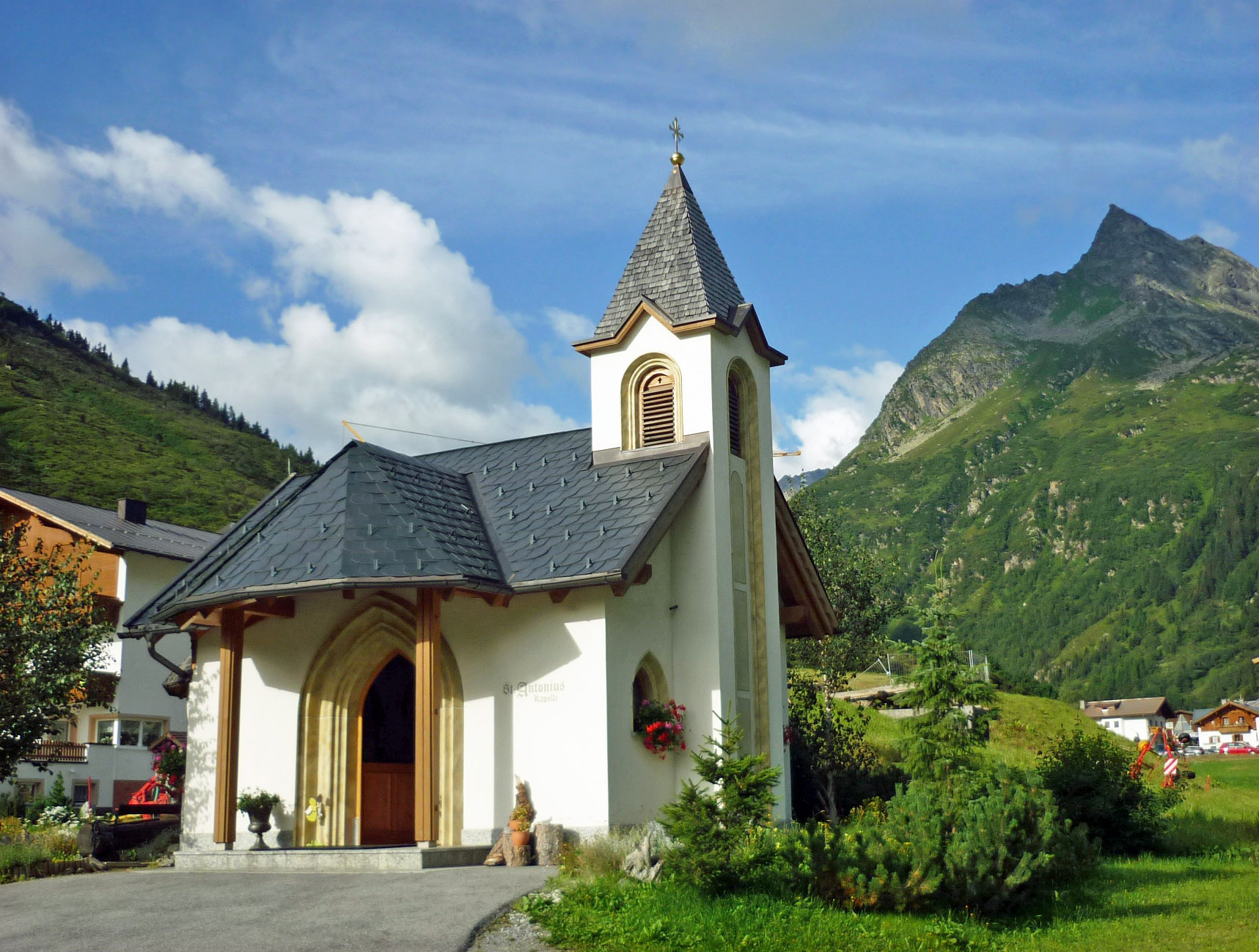
Chapel at Wirl, Galtür

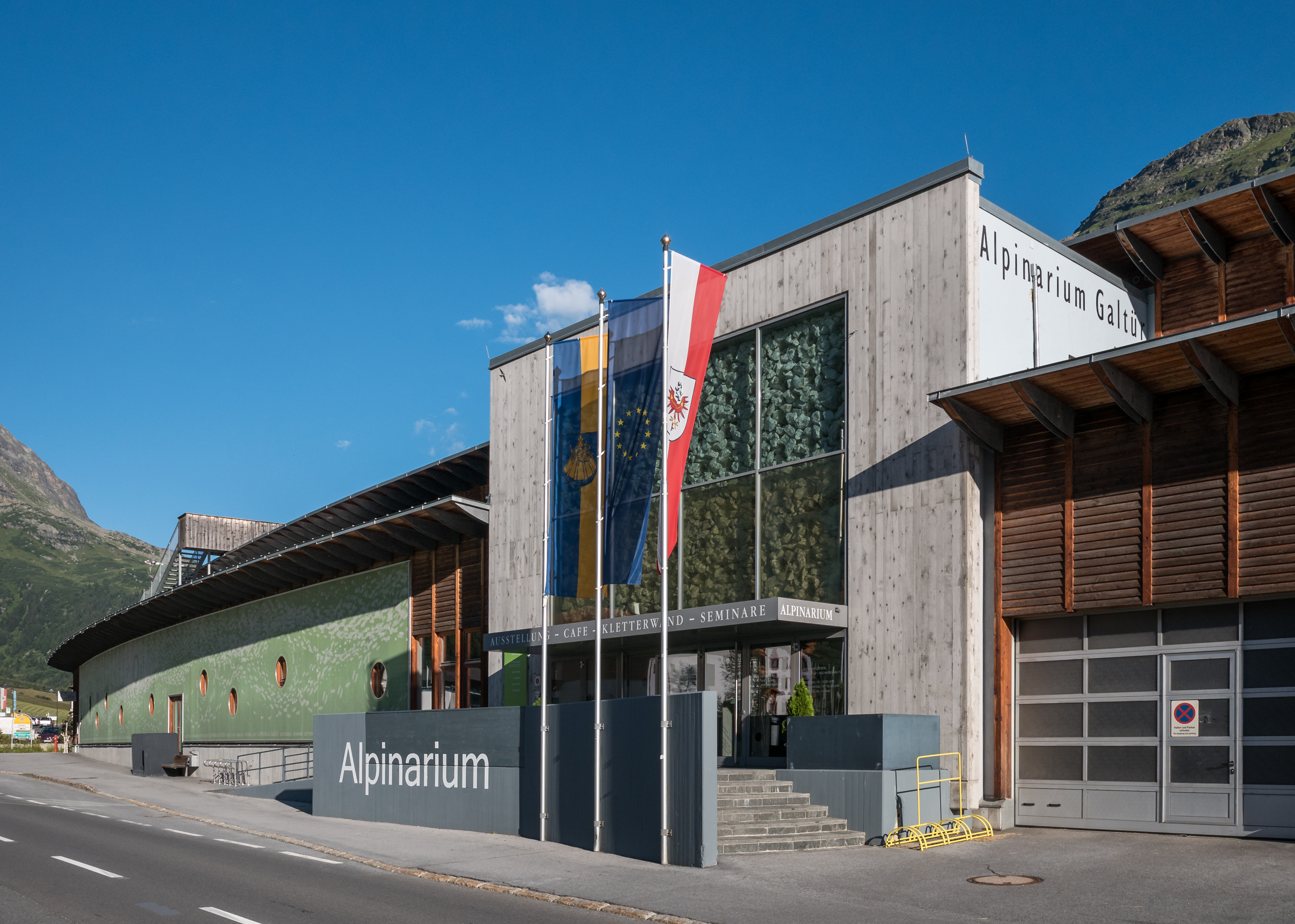
Alpinarium

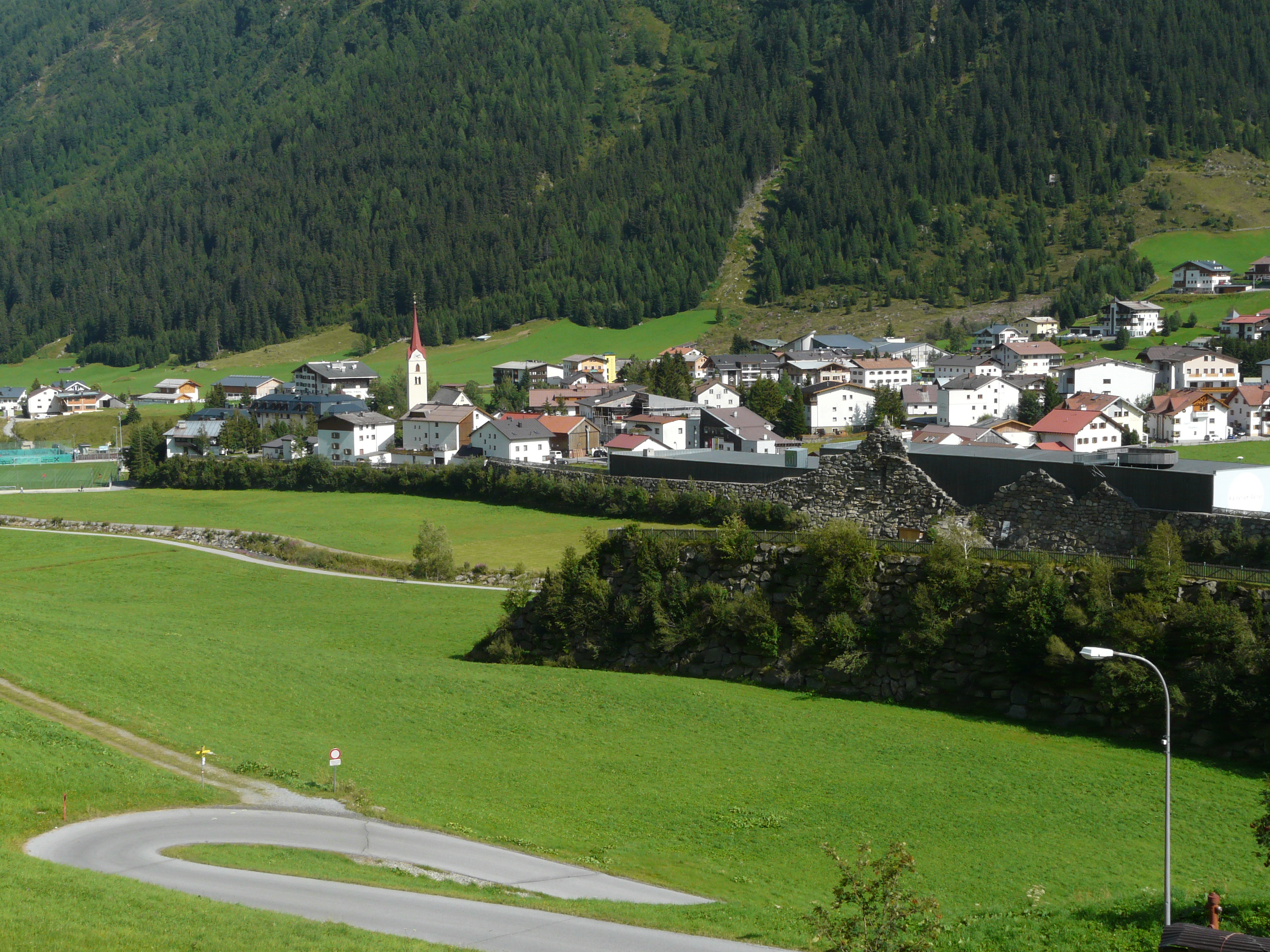
View of Galtür from the avalanche path

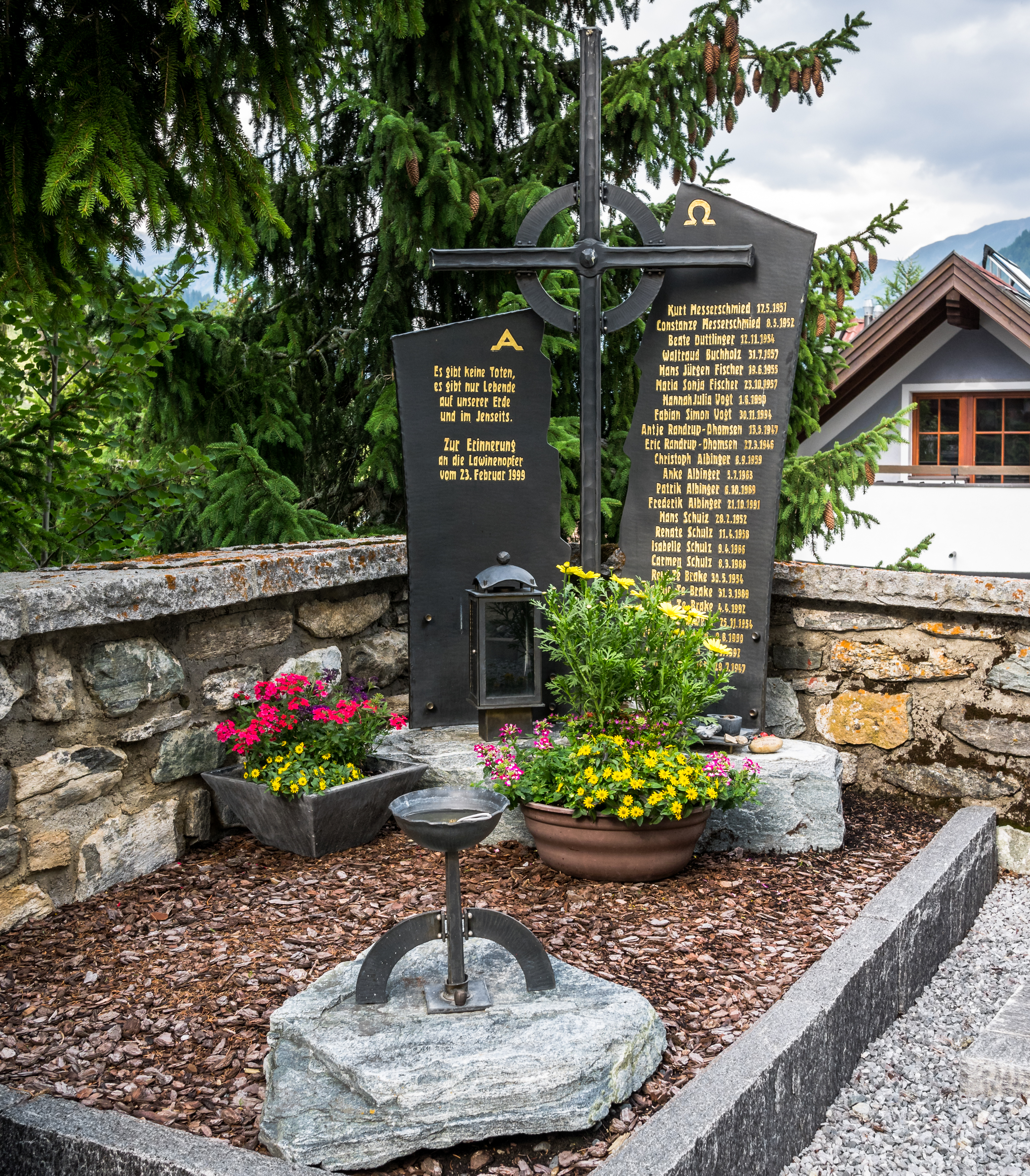
Memorial for the 31 avalanche victims who died in Galtür in February 1999

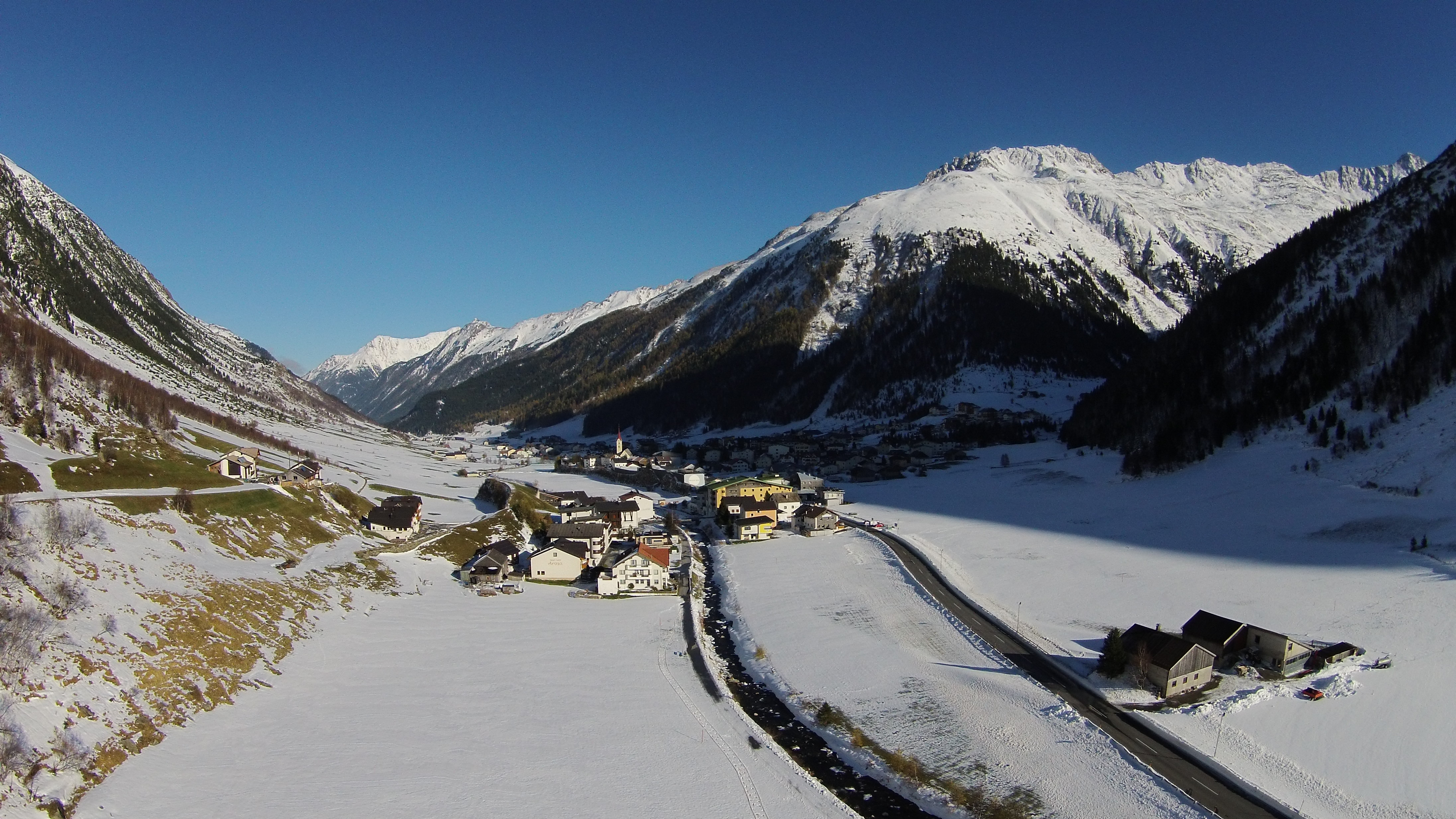
Galtür and the Silvretta Strasse road

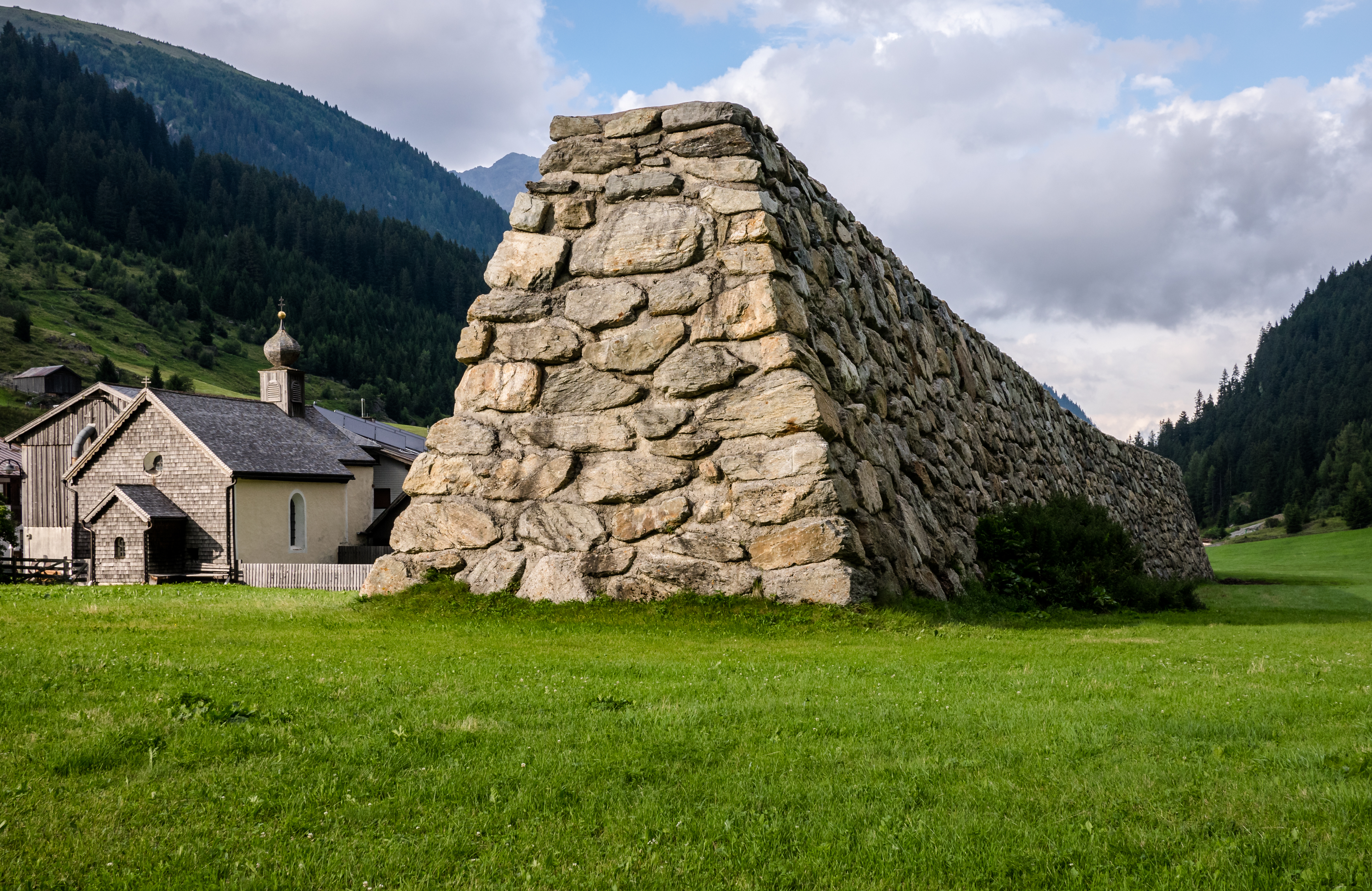
Avalanche protection in Tschaffein
