= Tösens =

Municipality in Tyrol, Austria

- Municipality
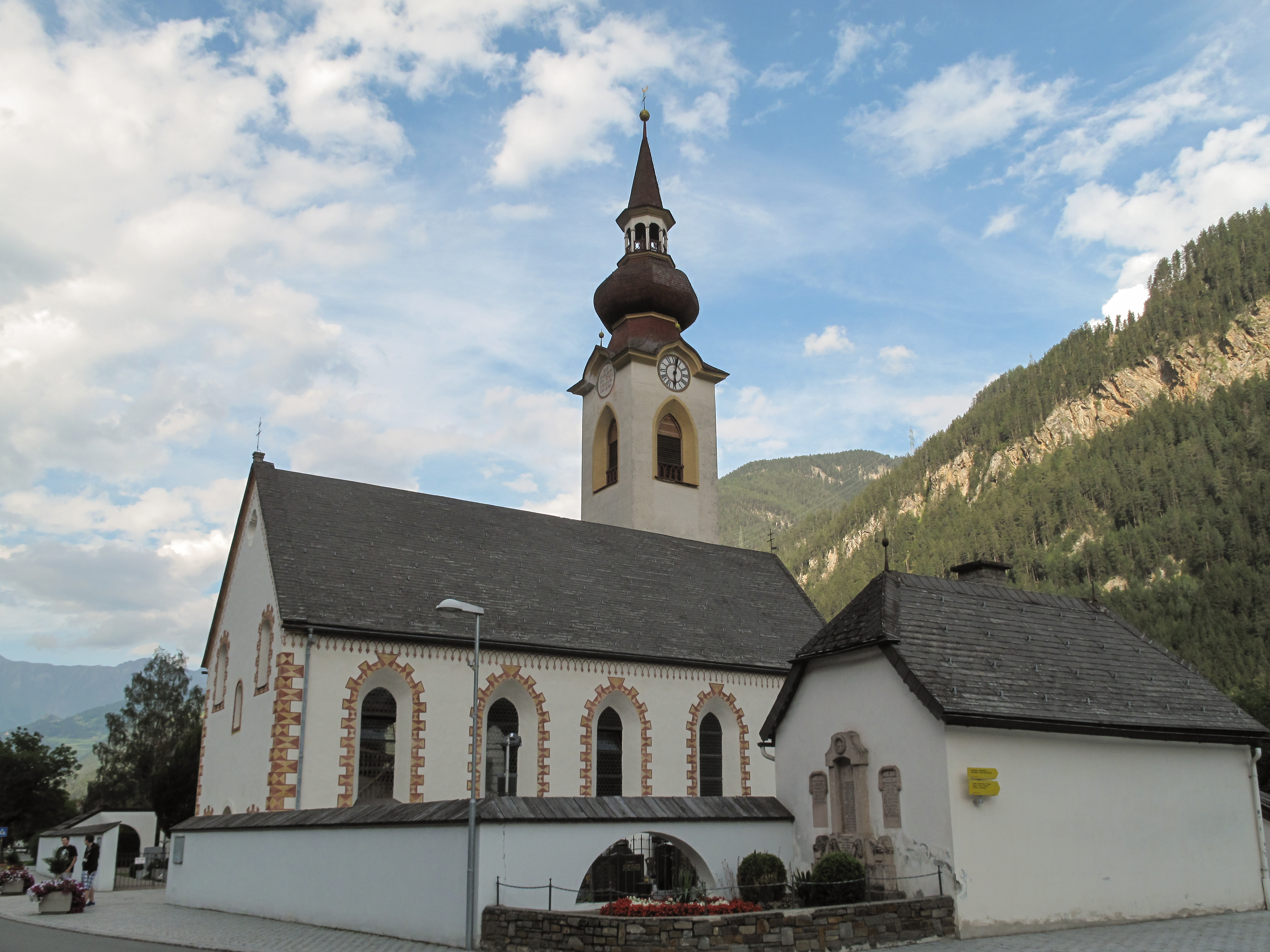

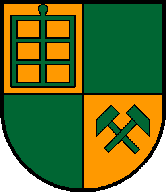
- Coat of arms

- Location within Austria
- Coordinates: 47°01′04″N 10°36′24″E
- Country: Austria
- State: Tyrol
- District: Landeck

Government
  - Mayor: Bernhard Achenrainer

Area
  - Total: 31.12 km^{2} (12.02 sq mi)
- Elevation: 930 m (3,050 ft)

Population (2018-01-01)
  - Total: 728
  - Density: 23.4/km^{2} (60.6/sq mi)
- Time zone: UTC+1 (CET)
  - Summer (DST): UTC+2 (CEST)
- Postal code: 6541
- Area code: 05472
- Vehicle registration: LA
- Website: www.toesens.tirol.gv.at

Tösens is a municipality in the district of Landeck in the Austrian state of Tyrol located 14 km south of the city of Landeck. The main source of income is tourism.
