= Fließ =

- Municipality
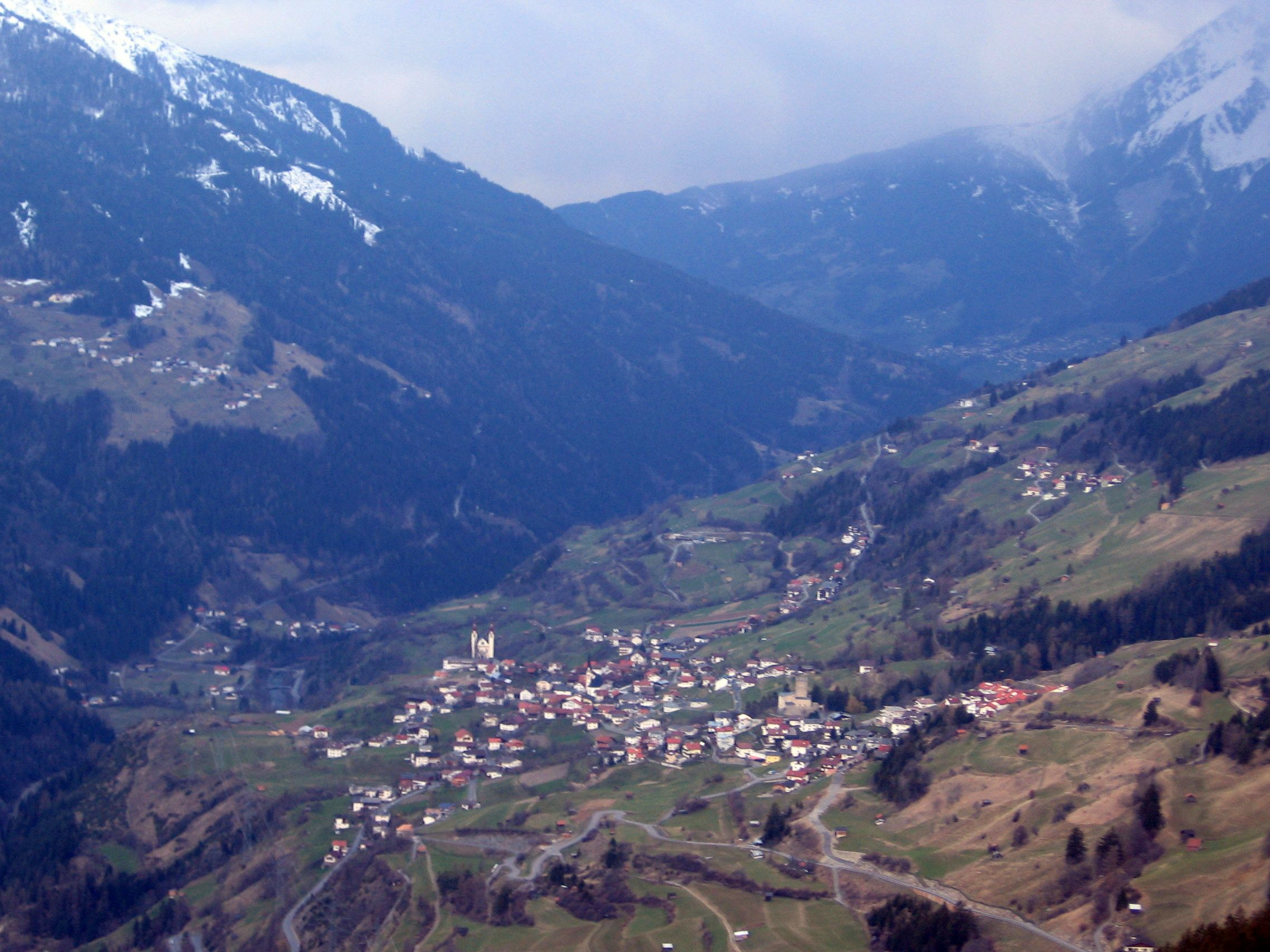

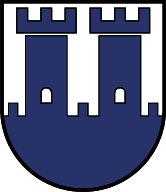
- Coat of arms

- Location within Austria
- Coordinates: 47°07′12″N 10°37′39″E
- Country: Austria
- State: Tyrol
- District: Landeck

Government
  - Mayor: Hans-Peter Bock

Area
  - Total: 47.57 km^{2} (18.37 sq mi)
- Elevation: 1,073 m (3,520 ft)

Population (2018-01-01)
  - Total: 3,019
  - Density: 63.46/km^{2} (164.4/sq mi)
- Time zone: UTC+1 (CET)
  - Summer (DST): UTC+2 (CEST)
- Postal code: 6521
- Area code: 05449
- Vehicle registration: LA
- Website: www.fliess.tirol.gv.at

Fließ is a municipality in the Landeck district in the Austrian state of Tyrol located 5 km south of Landeck on the upper course of the river Inn, in the upper part of Upper Inn Valley. It has nine hamlets and was already populated at the Roman age; the village itself was founded around the 6th century. After a conflagration in 1933 Fließ was restored more spacious. The main source of income is tourism (especially skiing).

== Population ==
Historical population
Year	Pop.	±%
1869	2,093	—
1880	2,041	−2.5%
1890	1,787	−12.4%
1900	1,595	−10.7%
1910	1,473	−7.6%
1923	1,527	+3.7%
1934	1,696	+11.1%
1939	1,513	−10.8%
1951	1,860	+22.9%
1961	1,990	+7.0%
1971	2,280	+14.6%
1981	2,409	+5.7%
1991	2,881	+19.6%
2001	2,924	+1.5%
2011	2,910	−0.5%
