= Landeck District =

Coordinates: 47.1°N 10.5°E

Landeck District Bezirk Landeck
- District
- Country: Austria
- State: Tyrol
- Number of municipalities: 30
- Administrative seat: Landeck

Government
  - District Governor: Siegmund Geiger

Area
  - Total: 1,595 km^{2} (616 sq mi)

Population (2015)
  - Total: 43,886
  - Density: 27.51/km^{2} (71.26/sq mi)
- Time zone: UTC+01:00 (CET)
  - Summer (DST): UTC+02:00 (CEST)
- Vehicle registration: LA

The Bezirk Landeck (Italian: Distretto di Landeck) is an administrative district (Bezirk) in Tyrol, Austria. It borders the district Reutte in the north, the district Imst in the east, South Tyrol (Italy) and Graubünden (Switzerland) in the south, and the district Bludenz (Vorarlberg) in the west.

The area of the district is 1,595 km^{2}. The population is 43,886 (January 1, 2015), with a population density of 28 persons per km^{2}. The administrative center is Landeck.

== Geography ==
The district comprises the uppermost part of the Inn valley and its tributary valleys Kaunertal, Stanzer Tal, and Paznaun. Mountain ranges in the district include parts of the Ötztal Alps, the Samnaun Alps, parts of the Verwall Alps and the Lechtal Alps, and the Arlberg area.

Historical population
Year	Pop.	±%
1869	21,634	—
1880	22,354	+3.3%
1890	20,984	−6.1%
1900	20,836	−0.7%
1910	22,415	+7.6%
1923	23,352	+4.2%
1934	24,708	+5.8%
1939	26,316	+6.5%
1951	28,882	+9.8%
1961	31,106	+7.7%
1971	35,629	+14.5%
1981	37,553	+5.4%
1991	40,207	+7.1%
2001	42,799	+6.4%
Source: Statistik Austria

== Administrative divisions ==
The district is divided into 30 municipalities, one of which is a city.

=== City ===
1. Landeck (7,742)

=== Municipalities ===
1. Faggen (371)
2. Fendels (270)
3. Fiss (978)
4. Fließ (2,921)
5. Flirsch (939)
6. Galtür (826)
7. Grins (1,386)
8. Ischgl (1,596)
9. Kappl (2,625)
10. Kaunerberg (402)
11. Kaunertal (630)
12. Kauns (472)
13. Ladis (533)
14. Nauders (1,558)
15. Pettneu am Arlberg (1,459)
16. Pfunds (2,544)
17. Pians (800)
18. Prutz (1,735)
19. Ried im Oberinntal (1,264)
20. Sankt Anton am Arlberg (2,564)
21. Schönwies (1,712)
22. See (1,164)
23. Serfaus (1,081)
24. Spiss (134)
25. Stanz bei Landeck (590)
26. Strengen (1,208)
27. Tobadill (497)
28. Tösens (669)
29. Zams (3,273)

(population numbers as of January 1, 2012)
