= Franz Anton von Zauner =

Austrian sculptor (1746/1748–1822)

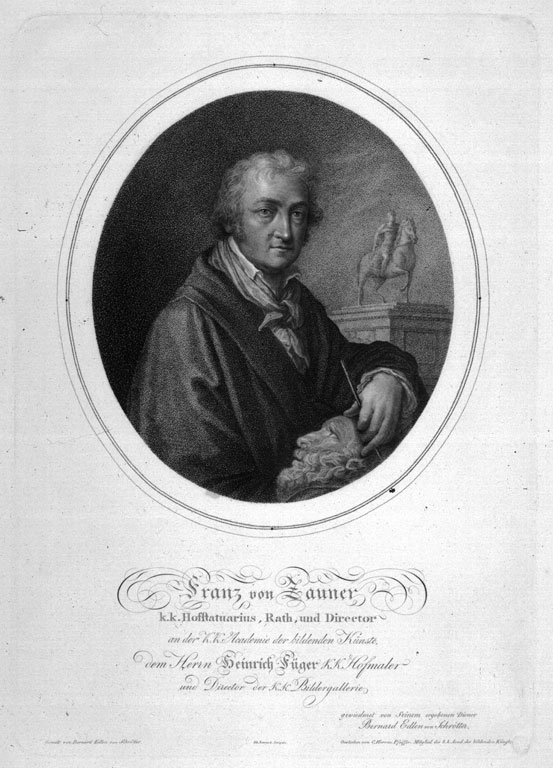
Franz von Zauner; after a painting by Bernhard von Schroetter (1772–1842)

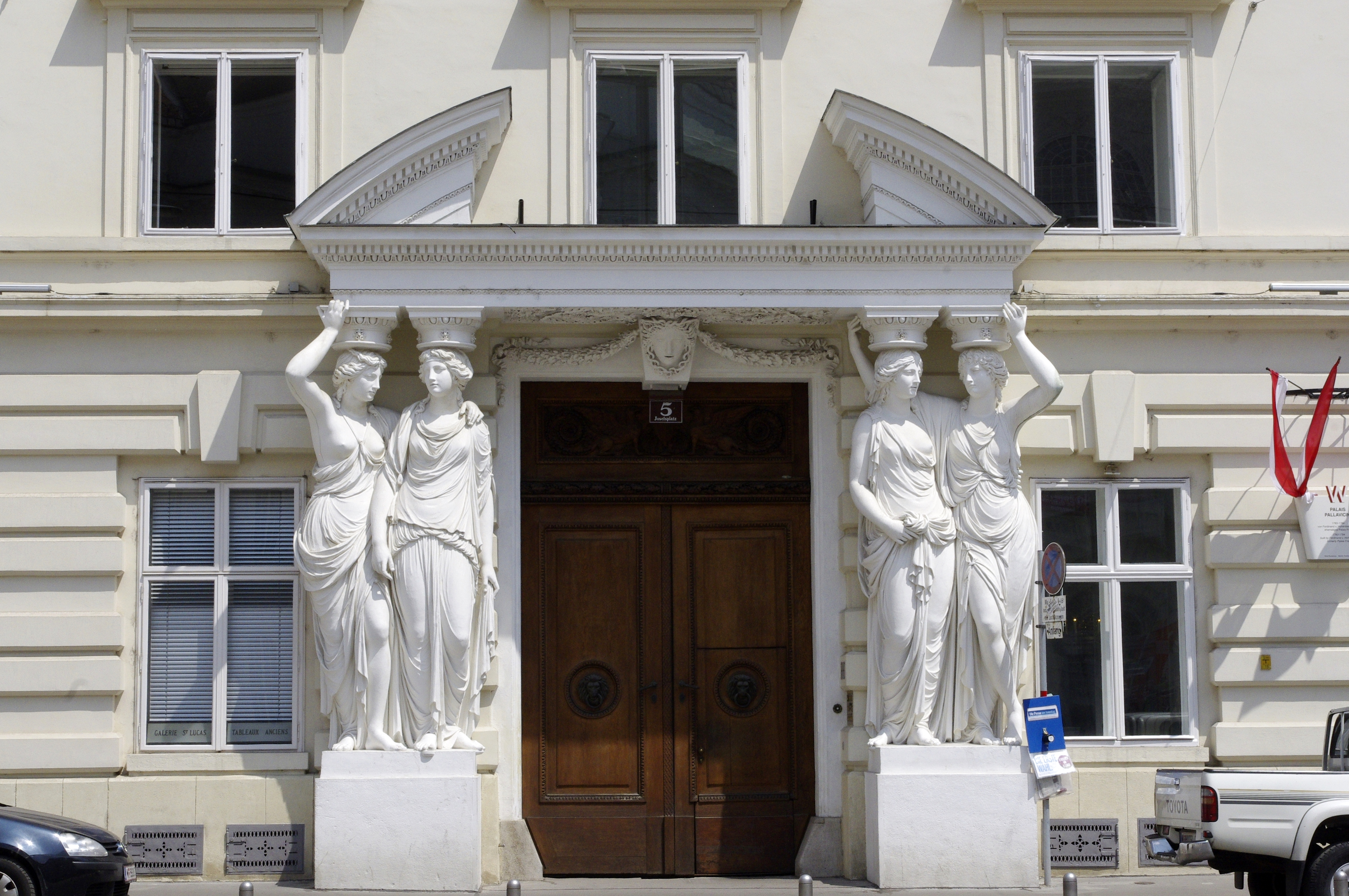
Caryatids at the Palais Pallavicini (mid 1780s) These figures can be seen in Sir Carol Reed's classic film The Third Man

Franz Anton von Zauner (5 July 1746/48, Kaunerberg – 3 March 1822, Vienna) was an Austrian sculptor who worked in the Neoclassical style.

== Life ==
Although his parents were poor, they supported his desire to become an artist and a local sculptor helped him develop his woodcarving skills. When he was ten years old, he was apprenticed to an uncle who had a masonry workshop and remained there for ten years. In 1766, he was enrolled at the Academy of Fine Arts, Vienna, where he became a professor in 1782 and later director (1806–1815). One of his first projects after graduating involved a series of anatomical figures for the famed ophthalmologist Joseph Barth. He was offered a permanent position as an anatomical sculptor at a good salary, but had higher ambitions and turned it down.

A commission from Prince Kaunitz for fountains at the Schönbrunn Palace enabled him to a stay in Rome from 1776 to 1781, initially under the sponsorship of Anton Raphael Mengs. While there, he became dissatisfied with what he felt were the superfluous mannerisms of the most popular sculptures and sought to create a purer Classical style. His equestrian statue of Joseph II, Holy Roman Emperor, won him a knighthood from Kaiser Franz I. It later became the subject of a poem by Anastasius Grün. He is also well known for a monument to Leopold II in the Augustinian Church and the tomb of Field Marshal Ernst Gideon von Laudon at the Schloss Laudon.

In the 1780s Zauner was a member of the Viennese Freemason lodge "Zur wahren Eintracht", where Joseph Haydn was also a member and Wolfgang Amadeus Mozart was a frequent visitor. In 1894 a street in Wien-Landstraße was named the "Zaunergasse" in his honor.
