= Kauns =

Municipality in Tyrol, Austria

- Municipality
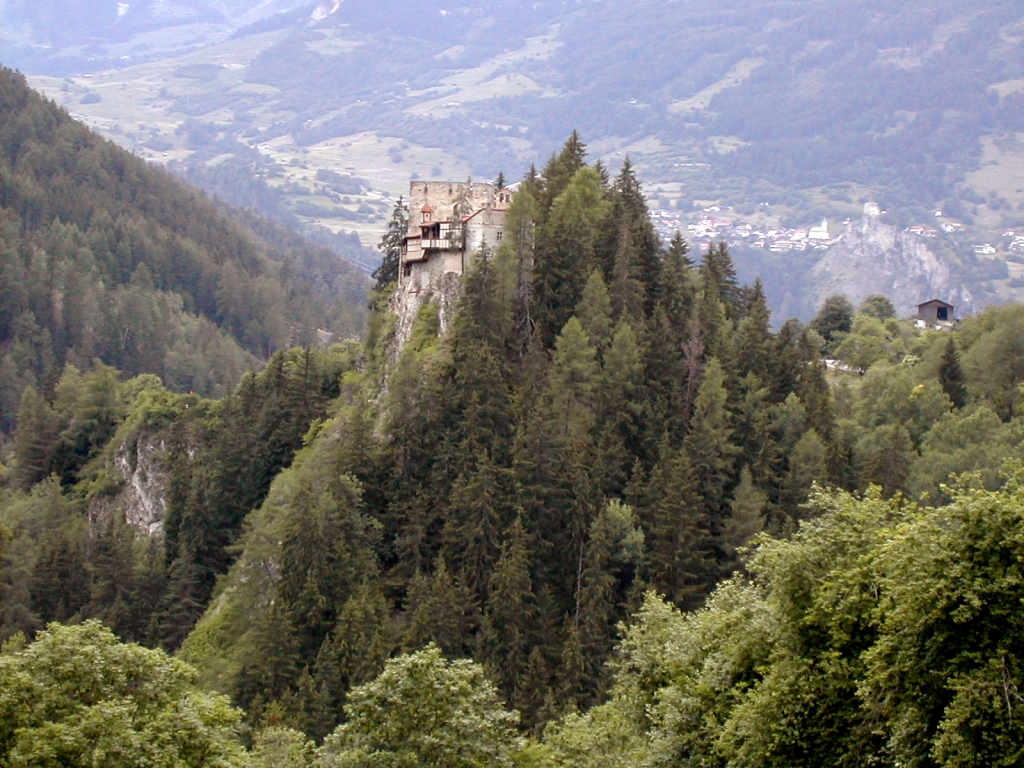
- Berneck Castle in Kauns

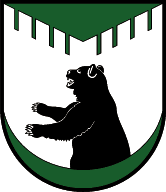
- Coat of arms

- Location within Austria
- Coordinates: 47°04′40″N 10°41′26″E
- Country: Austria
- State: Tyrol
- District: Landeck

Government
  - Mayor: Reinhard Wille

Area
  - Total: 8.23 km^{2} (3.18 sq mi)
- Elevation: 1,050 m (3,440 ft)

Population (2018-01-01)
  - Total: 502
  - Density: 61.0/km^{2} (158/sq mi)
- Time zone: UTC+1 (CET)
  - Summer (DST): UTC+2 (CEST)
- Postal code: 6522
- Area code: 05472
- Vehicle registration: LA

Kauns is a tiny municipality in the district of Landeck in the Austrian state of Tyrol located about 12 km southeast of Landeck and 1 km below Kaunerberg at the upper course of the Inn River. Several fires have tortured the village; only a few houses survived the catastrophes.
