= Fendel =

Fendel is a surname. Notable people with the surname include:

- Hillel Fendel, Israeli journalist
- Rosemarie Fendel (1927–2013), German actress

== See also ==
- Fendels, municipality in Tyrol, Austria
