= Flirsch =

Municipality in Tyrol, Austria

- Municipality
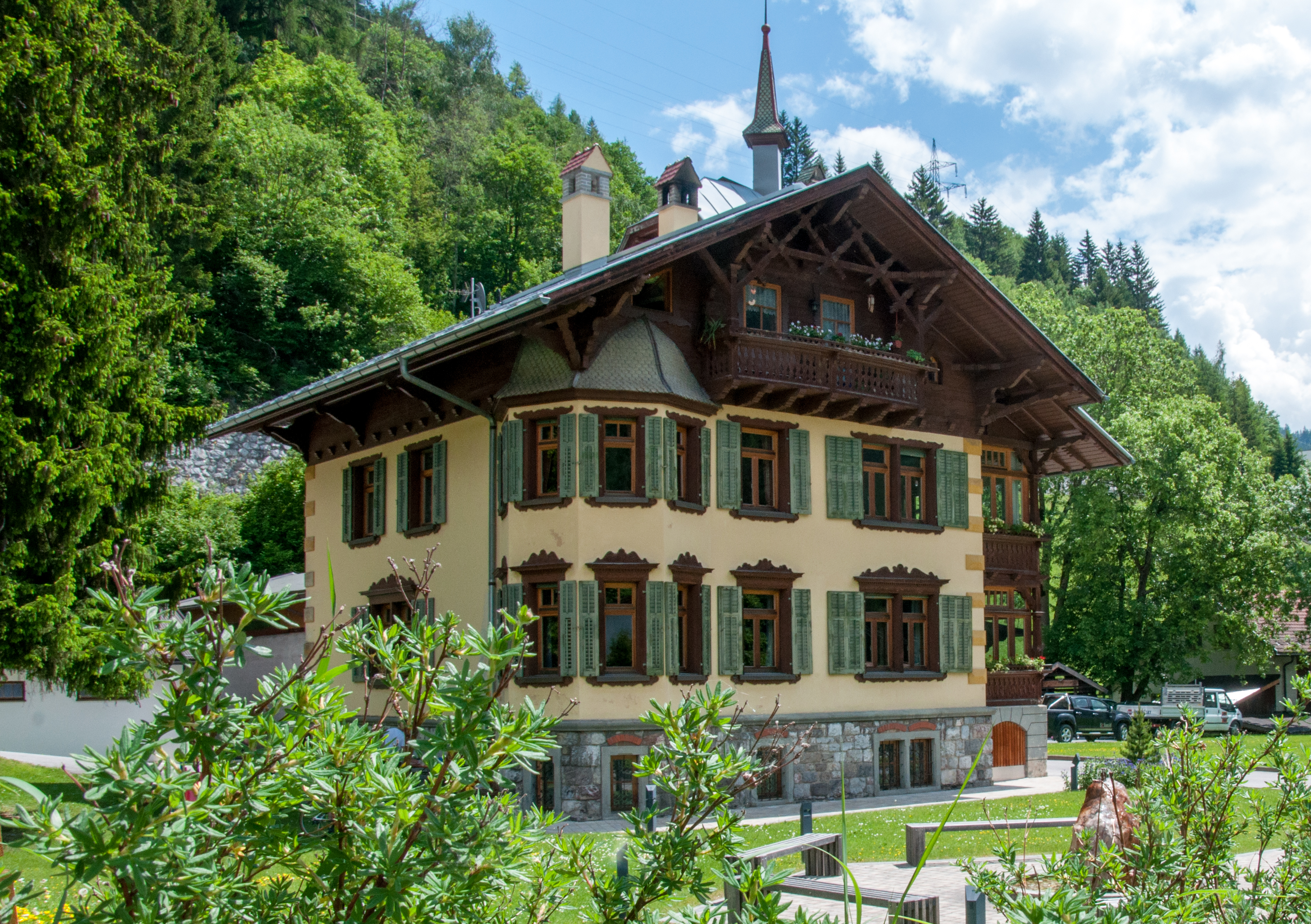
- Flirsch town hall

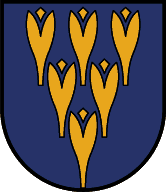
- Coat of arms

- Location within Austria
- Coordinates: 47°08′55″N 10°24′31″E
- Country: Austria
- State: Tyrol
- District: Landeck

Government
  - Mayor: Roland Wechner

Area
  - Total: 31.05 km^{2} (11.99 sq mi)
- Elevation: 1,154 m (3,786 ft)

Population (2021)
  - Total: 991
  - Density: 31.9/km^{2} (82.7/sq mi)
- Time zone: UTC+1 (CET)
  - Summer (DST): UTC+2 (CEST)
- Postal code: 6572
- Area code: 05447
- Vehicle registration: LA
- Website: www.flirsch.tirol.gv.at

Flirsch is a municipality in the Landeck district in Austrian state of Tyrol. It is located 11 km west of Landeck and 10 km east of Sankt Anton am Arlberg.

Although the area was previously settled, the village was mentioned for the first time in documents in 1275. The origin of the name lies in Rhaeto-Romance languages. Flirsch became an autonomous community in 1813.
