= Stanz bei Landeck =

Municipality in Tyrol, Austria

- Municipality
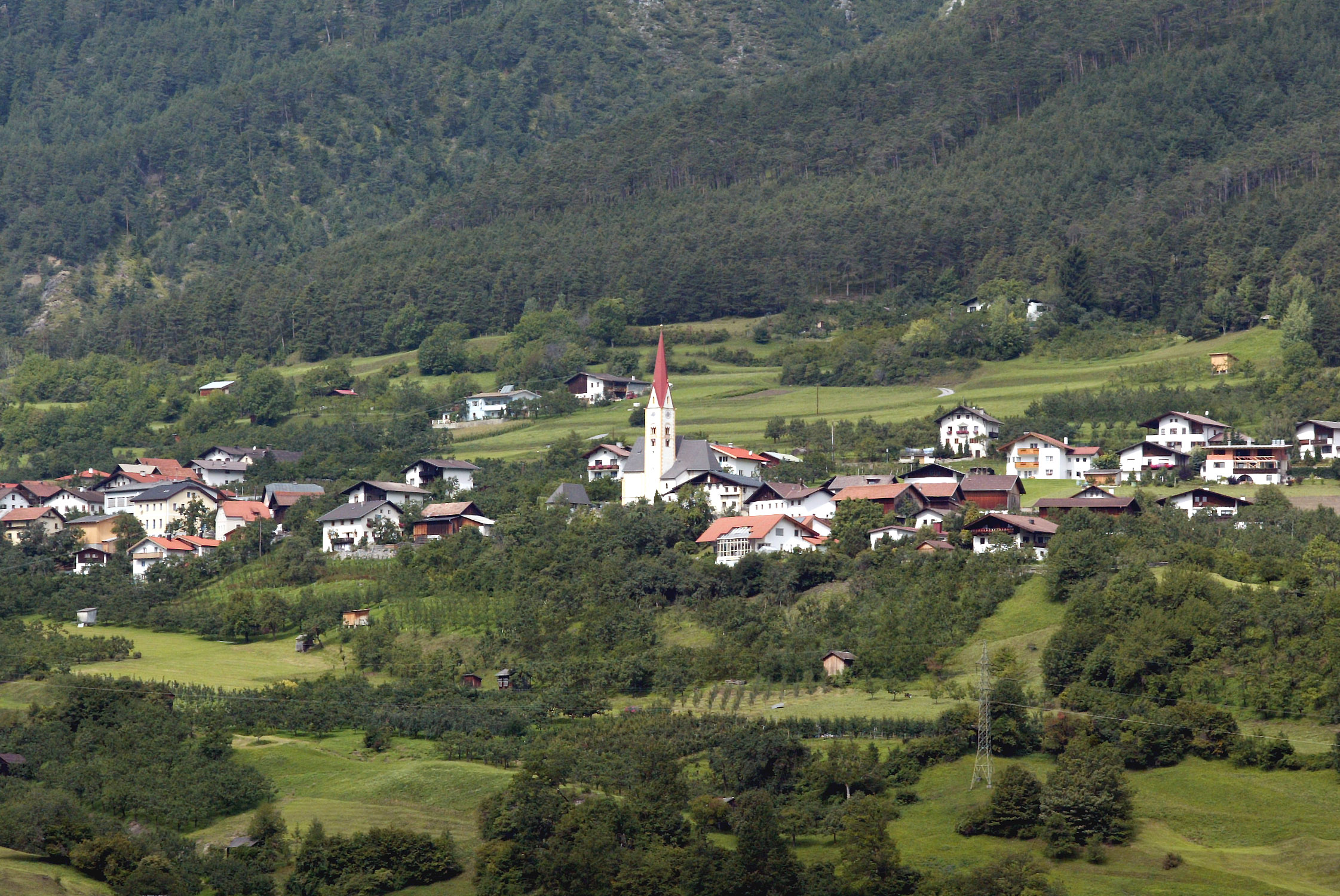

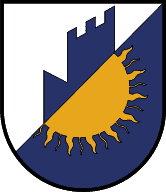
- Coat of arms

- Location within Austria
- Coordinates: 47°13′33″N 10°57′06″E
- Country: Austria
- State: Tyrol
- District: Landeck

Government
  - Mayor: Martin Auer

Area
  - Total: 7.33 km^{2} (2.83 sq mi)
- Elevation: 1,040 m (3,410 ft)

Population (2018-01-01)
  - Total: 577
  - Density: 78.7/km^{2} (204/sq mi)
- Time zone: UTC+1 (CET)
  - Summer (DST): UTC+2 (CEST)
- Postal code: 6500
- Area code: 05442
- Vehicle registration: LA
- Website: www.stanz.tirol.gv.at

Stanz bei Landeck is a municipality in the district of Landeck in the Austrian state of Tyrol located 1 km north of the city of Landeck. The village was first mentioned in documents in 1150 as „Stanuc“. The main source of income is plums which are processed into schnapps.
