= Faggen =

- Municipality
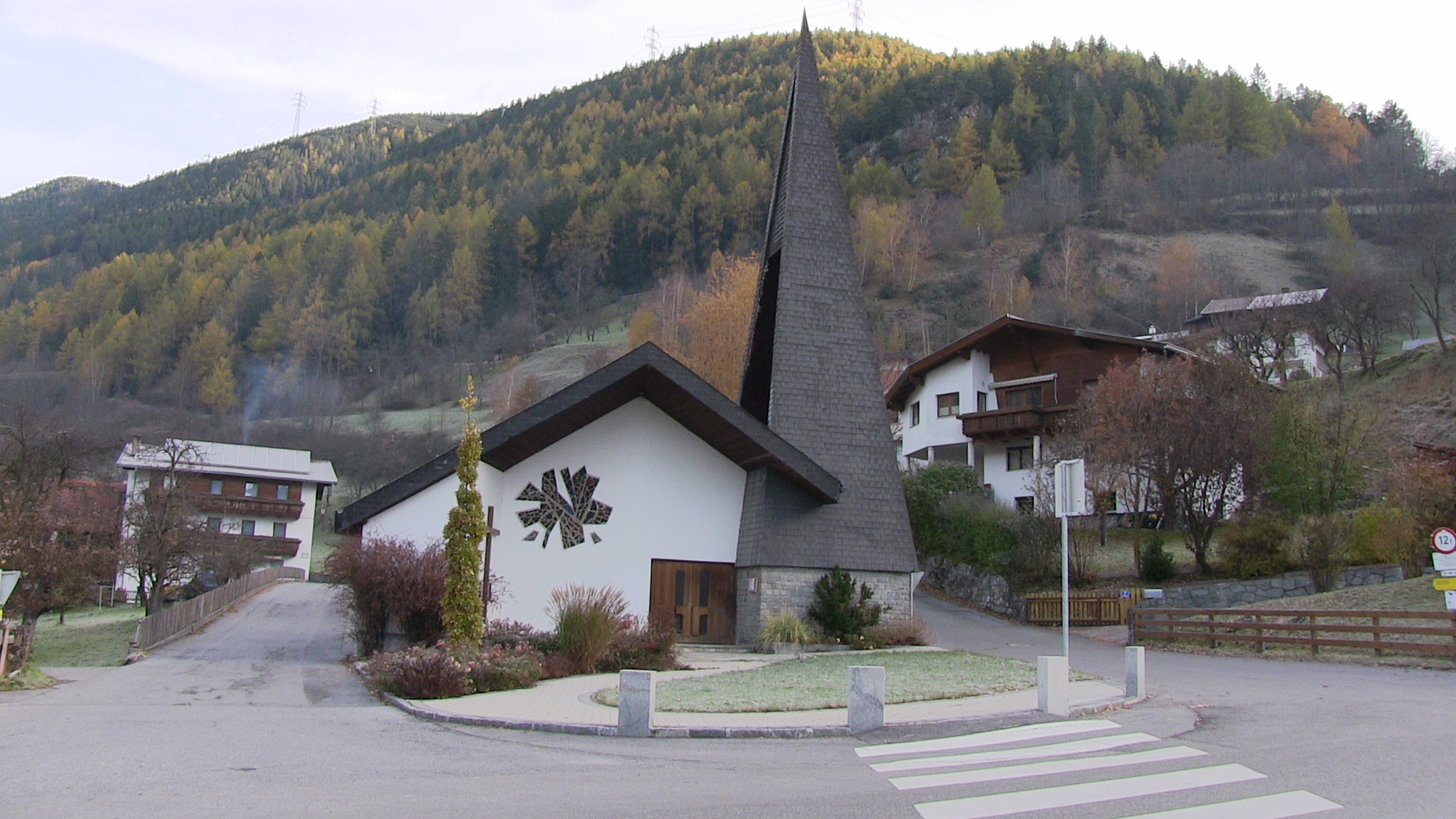
- Chapel in Faggen

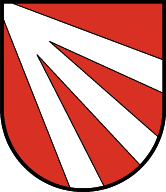
- Coat of arms

- Location within Austria
- Coordinates: 47°04′50″N 10°40′20″E
- Country: Austria
- State: Tyrol
- District: Landeck

Government
  - Mayor: Andreas Förg

Area
  - Total: 3.63 km^{2} (1.40 sq mi)
- Elevation: 900 m (3,000 ft)

Population (2021)
  - Total: 383
  - Density: 106/km^{2} (273/sq mi)
- Time zone: UTC+1 (CET)
  - Summer (DST): UTC+2 (CEST)
- Postal code: 6522
- Area code: 05472
- Vehicle registration: LA

Faggen is a municipality in the Landeck district in the Austrian state of Tyrol located 10.5 km south of Landeck at the entrance of the Kauner Valley which is a side valley on the upper course of the Inn River.

It has six hamlets and is very weak in structure. The main source of income is „gentle“ agriculture but many inhabitants are commuters because there are hardly jobs.
