= Fendels =

Municipality in Tyrol, Austria

- Municipality
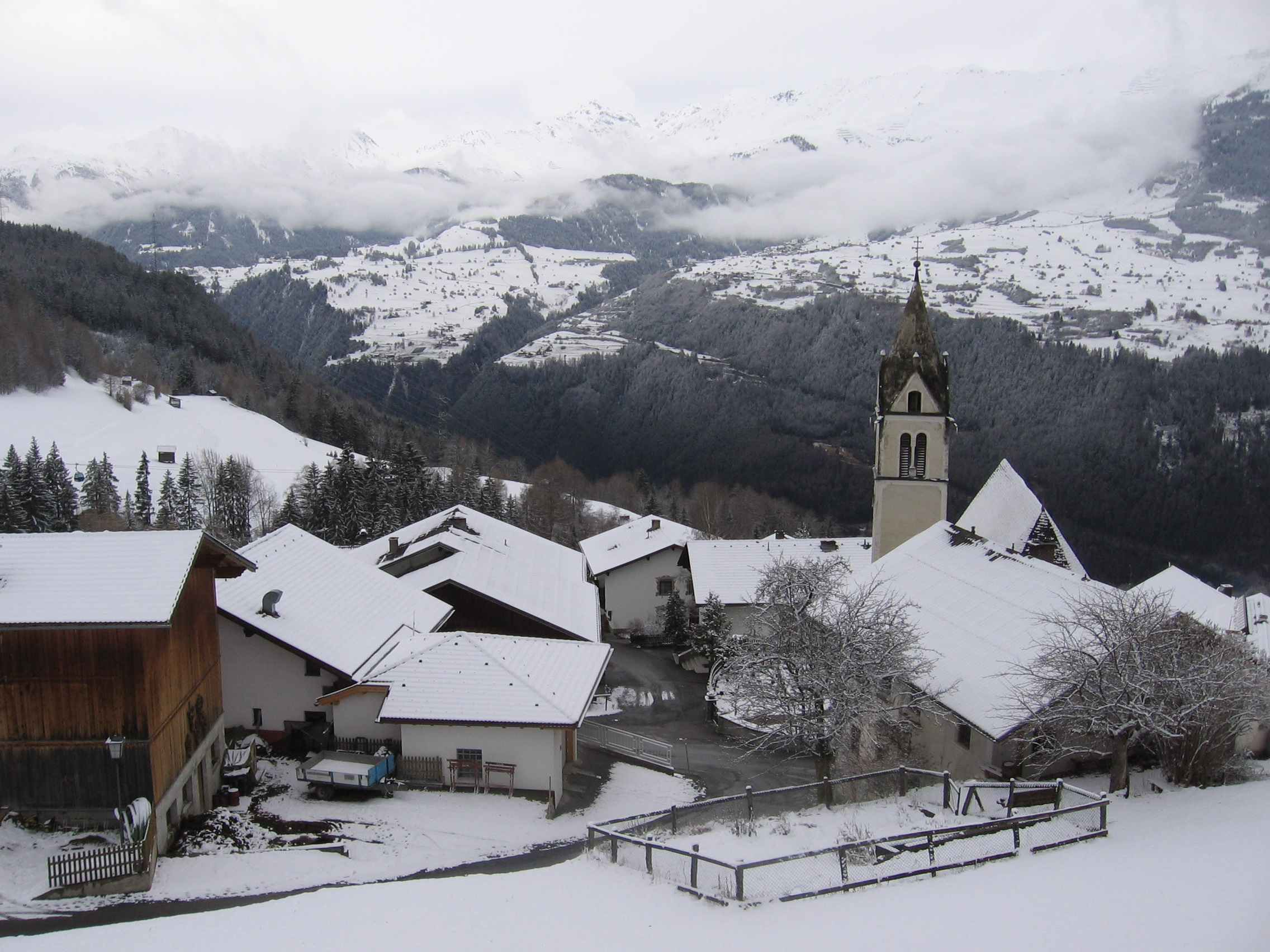
- View of Fendels

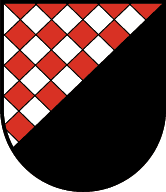
- Coat of arms

- Location within Austria
- Coordinates: 47°03′13″N 10°40′35″E
- Country: Austria
- State: Tyrol
- District: Landeck

Government
  - Mayor: Heinrich Scherl (ÖVP)

Area
  - Total: 13.48 km^{2} (5.20 sq mi)
- Elevation: 1,352 m (4,436 ft)

Population (2018-01-01)
  - Total: 259
  - Density: 19.2/km^{2} (49.8/sq mi)
- Time zone: UTC+1 (CET)
  - Summer (DST): UTC+2 (CEST)
- Postal code: 6528
- Area code: 05472
- Vehicle registration: LA
- Website: www.fendels.tirol.gv.at

Fendels is a municipality in the Landeck district in the Austrian state of Tyrol located 13 km south of Landeck on the upper course of the Inn River. The village was mentioned for the first time in documents in 1297. Until 1959 it was only reachable by cable car. The construction of a street helped the village to get connected. The main source of income is „gentle“ Winter tourism.
