= Fiss =

Municipality in Tyrol, Austria

- Municipality
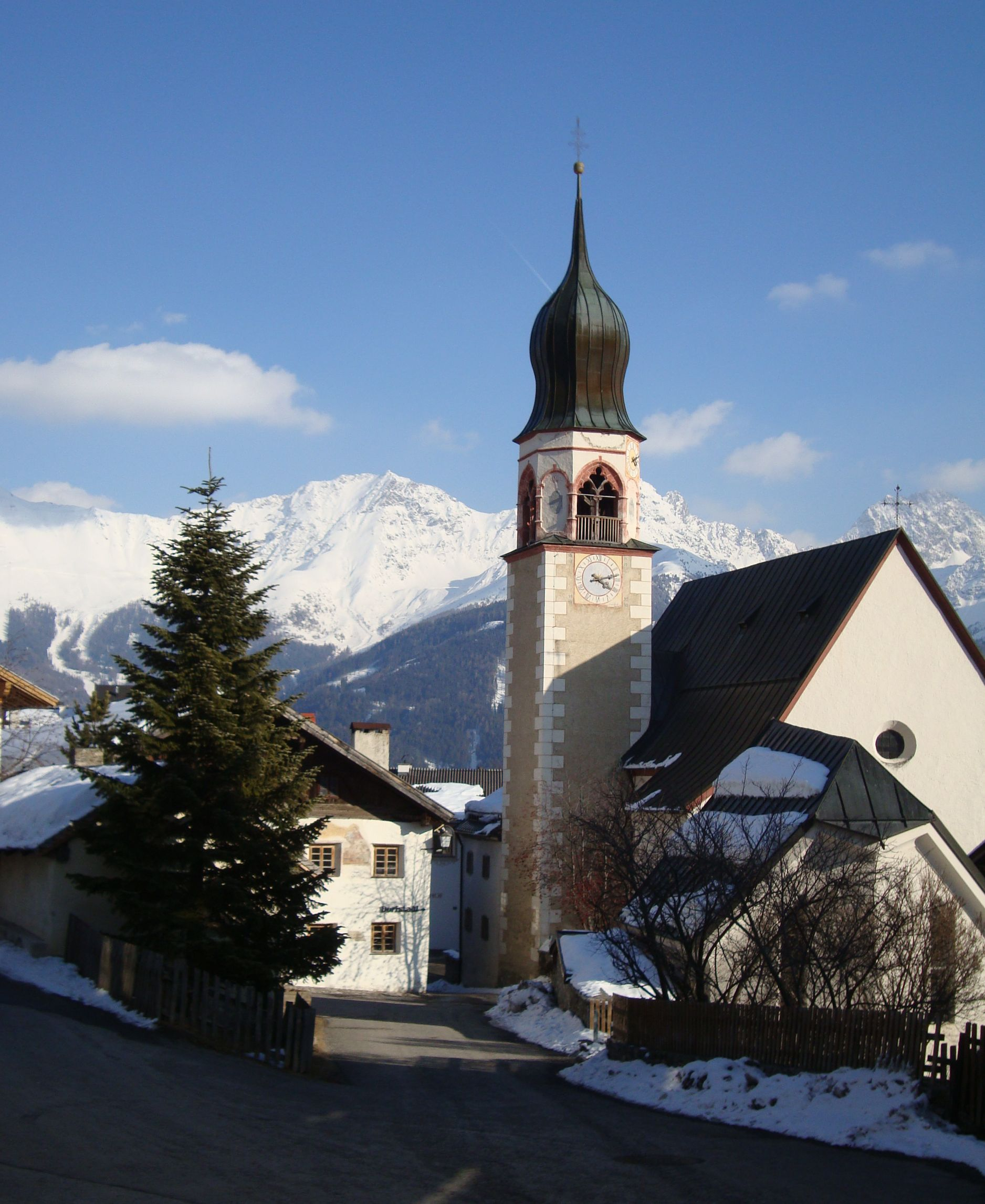

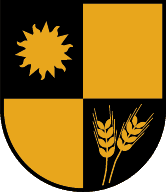
- Coat of arms

- Location within Austria
- Coordinates: 47°03′19″N 10°37′11″E
- Country: Austria
- State: Tyrol
- District: Landeck

Government
  - Mayor: Markus Pale

Area
  - Total: 37.7 km^{2} (14.6 sq mi)
- Elevation: 1,438 m (4,718 ft)

Population (2021)
  - Total: 995
  - Density: 26.4/km^{2} (68.4/sq mi)
- Time zone: UTC+1 (CET)
  - Summer (DST): UTC+2 (CEST)
- Postal code: 6533
- Area code: 05476
- Vehicle registration: LA
- Website: www.fiss.tirol.gv.at

Fiss is a municipality in the Landeck district in the Austrian state of Tyrol located 10.5 kilometers (6.5 mi) south of Landeck on the upper course of the Inn River. The main source of income is tourism.

== Population ==
Historical population
Year	Pop.	±%
1869	2,093	—
1880	2,041	−2.5%
1890	1,787	−12.4%
1900	1,595	−10.7%
1910	1,473	−7.6%
1923	1,527	+3.7%
1934	1,696	+11.1%
1939	1,513	−10.8%
1951	1,860	+22.9%
1961	1,990	+7.0%
1971	2,280	+14.6%
1981	2,409	+5.7%
1991	2,881	+19.6%
2001	2,924	+1.5%
2011	2,910	−0.5%
2017	996	−65.8%
