= Grins, Austria =

Municipality in Tyrol, Austria

Grins
- Municipality
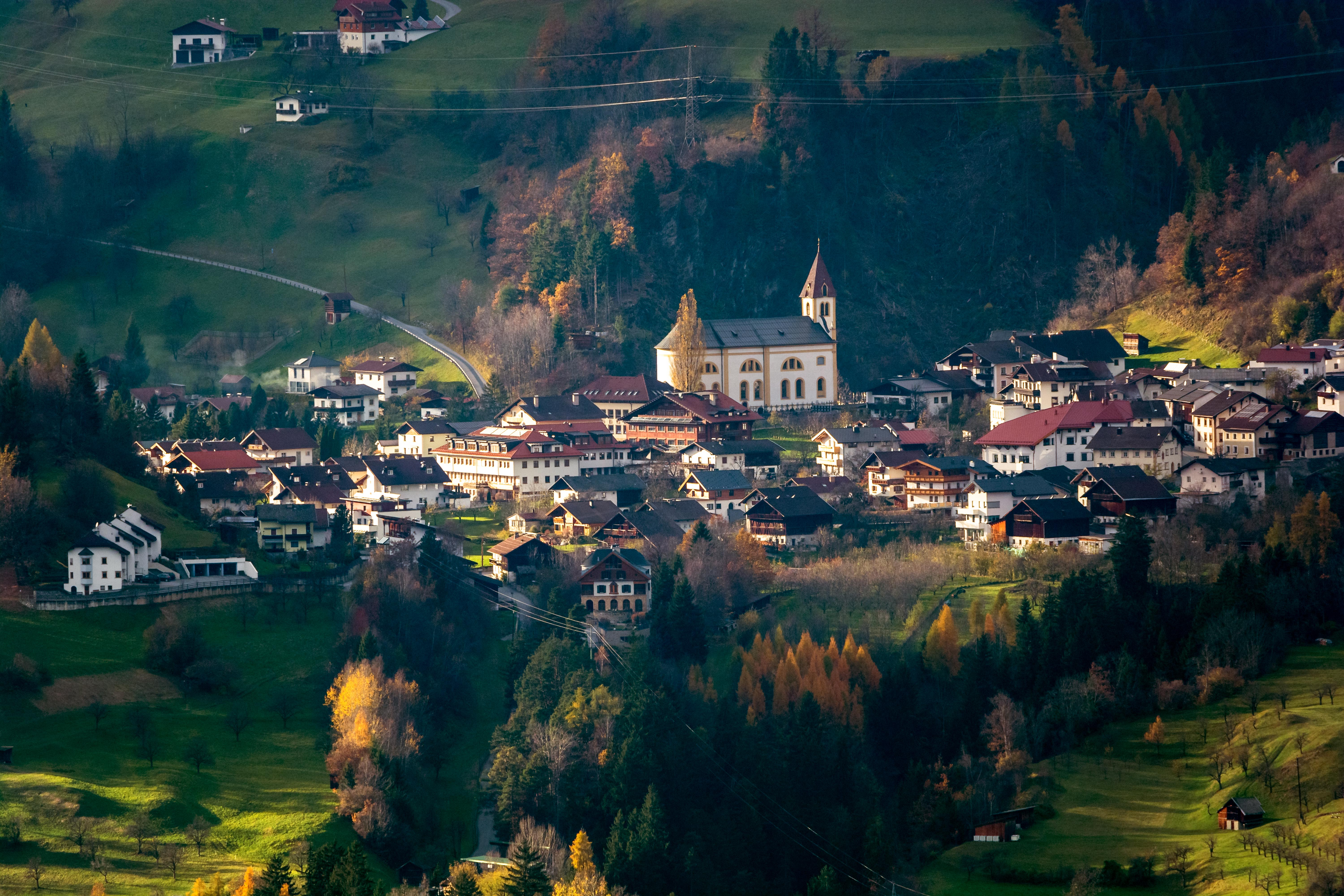
- View of Grins

- Coat of arms

- Location within Austria
- Coordinates: 47°08′29″N 10°30′53″E
- Country: Austria
- State: Tyrol
- District: Landeck

Government
  - Mayor: Thomas Lutz

Area
  - Total: 21.09 km^{2} (8.14 sq mi)
- Elevation: 1,006 m (3,301 ft)

Population (2018-01-01)
  - Total: 1,398
  - Density: 66.29/km^{2} (171.7/sq mi)
- Time zone: UTC+1 (CET)
  - Summer (DST): UTC+2 (CEST)
- Postal code: A-6591
- Area code: 05442
- Vehicle registration: LA
- Website: www.grins.tirol.gv.at

Grins is a municipality in the Landeck district in the Austrian state of Tyrol located 3.7 km west of Landeck and 18 km east of Sankt Anton am Arlberg. The village has 10 subdivisions. Settlement of the area began 2000 years ago because of the sunny climate, but the village was mentioned for the first time in documents in 1288 as „Grindes“.

In 1945 the location was greatly destroyed by a conflagration but was able to be restored true to the original. The primary source of income is summer tourism, but the village becomes a commuter community more and more.
