= Kappl =

Municipality in Tyrol, Austria

- Municipality
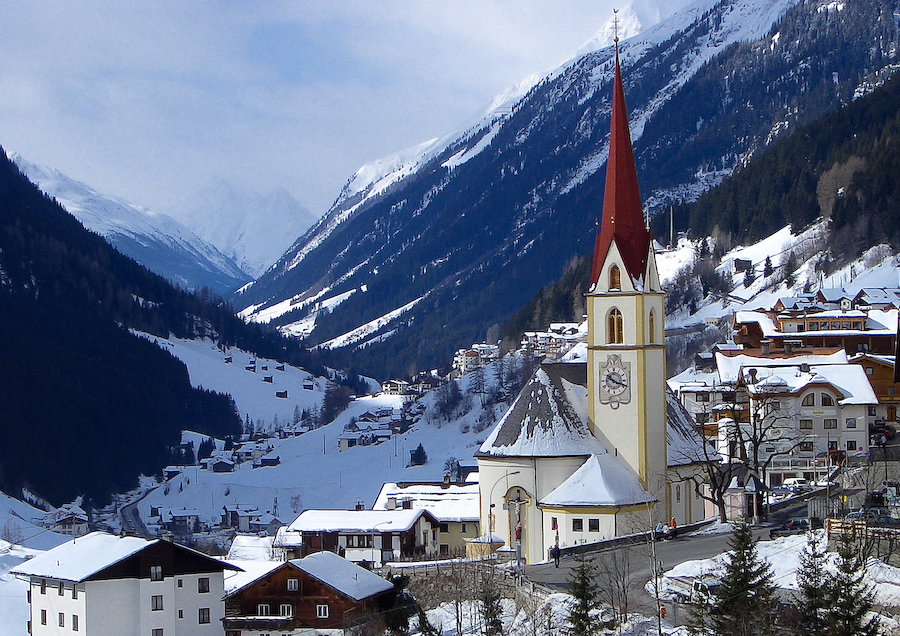

- Coat of arms

- Location within Austria
- Coordinates: 47°03′47″N 10°22′32″E
- Country: Austria
- State: Tyrol
- District: Landeck

Government
  - Mayor: Helmut Ladner

Area
  - Total: 97.48 km^{2} (37.64 sq mi)
- Elevation: 1,258 m (4,127 ft)

Population (2018-01-01)
  - Total: 2,617
  - Density: 26.85/km^{2} (69.53/sq mi)
- Time zone: UTC+1 (CET)
  - Summer (DST): UTC+2 (CEST)
- Postal code: 6555
- Area code: 05445
- Vehicle registration: LA
- Website: www.gemeinde.kappl.at

Kappl is a municipality in the district of Landeck in the Austrian state of Tyrol located about 17 km southwest of Landeck in the Paznaun Valley. It is one of the larger municipalities in the valley. Kappl was mentioned for the first time in 1370. The main source of income is tourism (especially skiing).
