= Paznaun =

Valley in Tyrol, Austria

Coordinates: 47°2′N 10°20′E

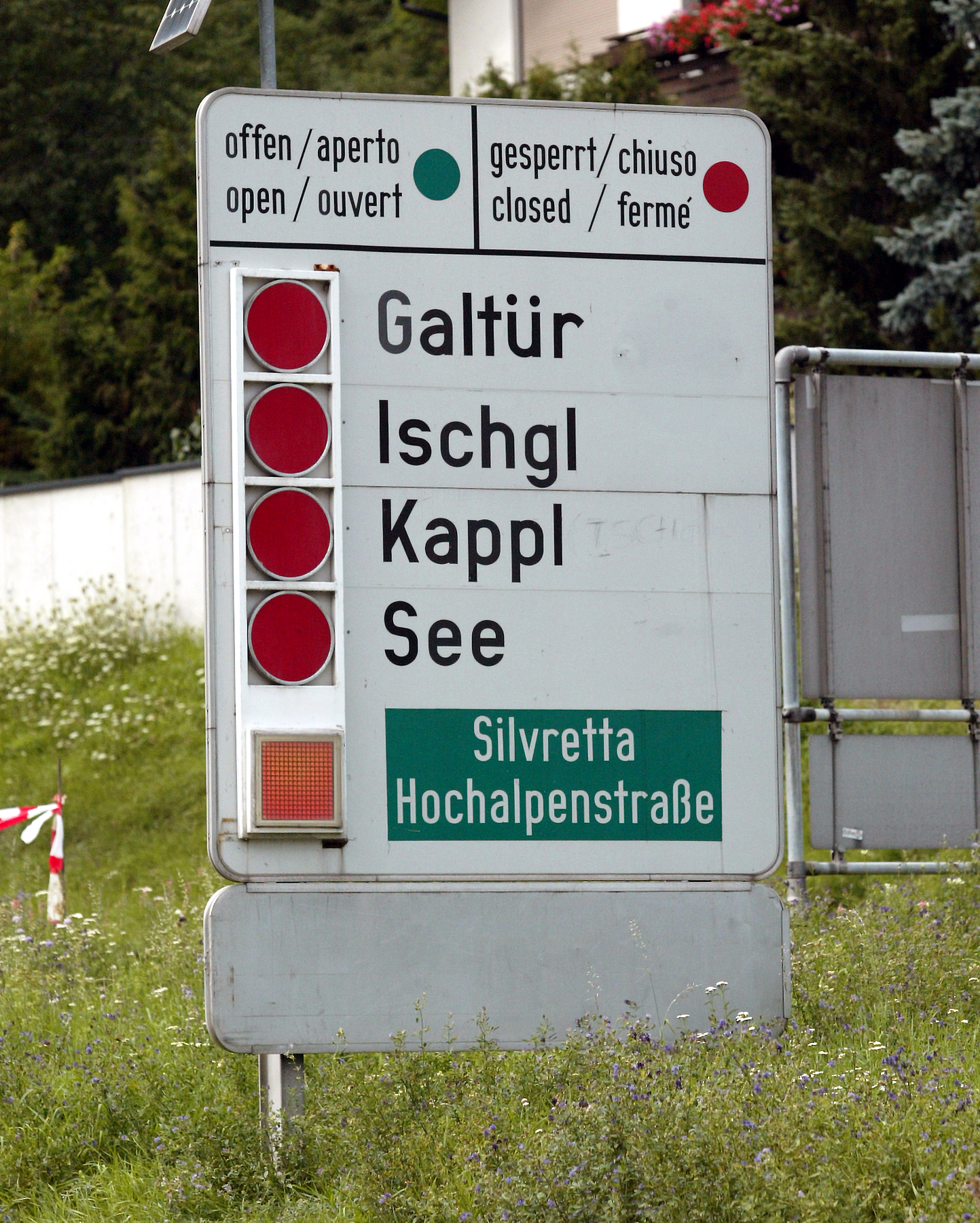
Access to cities blocked due to high water in 2005

== Background ==
The Paznaun (German: [pat͡sˈnaʊ̯n]) is a valley in western Tyrol, Austria, leading southwest from Pians (856 m) to the Bielerhöhe (2071 m), a mountain pass at the border of Vorarlberg and Tyrol.

The Paznaun is watered by the Trisanna and surrounded by the Central Eastern Alps, specifically, the mountain ranges of Verwall in the north, Samnaun in the southeast and Silvretta in the south-west. The main villages in the Paznaun are See (1050 m), Kappl (1226 m), Ischgl (1377 m) and Galtür (1586 m). Today, the main economic activity in the valley is tourism, especially winter sports. Each of the main villages has its own ski resort with the resort of Ischgl being the most prominent one.

== Natural Disasters and the COVID-19 pandemic ==
The Paznaun Valley is prone to natural disaster, experiencing flooding, mudslides, and avalanches. In August 2005 major flooding caused by heavy rainfall in the area of the valley blocked access to multiple cities. Avalanches have also been monitored in the valley; the Grosstal avalanche was recorded in 2012, which was a large avalanche near Ischgl. In July 2025 a large mudslide caused by a large thunderstorm hit multiple houses in Tyrol, in which the Austrian Armed Forces evacuated nearly 100 people.

Due to high tourism in the region, the Paznaun Valley has also been blamed for the initial spread of COVID-19 in Europe. During the COVID-19 outbreak, many tourists and skiers blamed three ski resorts and their respective towns within the Paznaun valley as sources of infection. As such, the Austrian government placed an extremely strict quarantine on the area during the COVID-19 pandemic.
