= See, Tyrol =

See
- Municipality
- Coat of arms

- Location within Austria
- Coordinates: 47°05′00″N 10°28′00″E
- Country: Austria
- State: Tyrol
- District: Landeck

Government
  - Mayor: Anton Mallaun (ÖVP)

Area
  - Total: 58.1 km^{2} (22.4 sq mi)
- Elevation: 1,056 m (3,465 ft)

Population (2018-01-01)
  - Total: 1,265
  - Density: 21.8/km^{2} (56.4/sq mi)
- Time zone: UTC+1 (CET)
  - Summer (DST): UTC+2 (CEST)
- Postal code: 6553
- Area code: 05441
- Vehicle registration: LA
- Website: www.see.tirol.gv.at

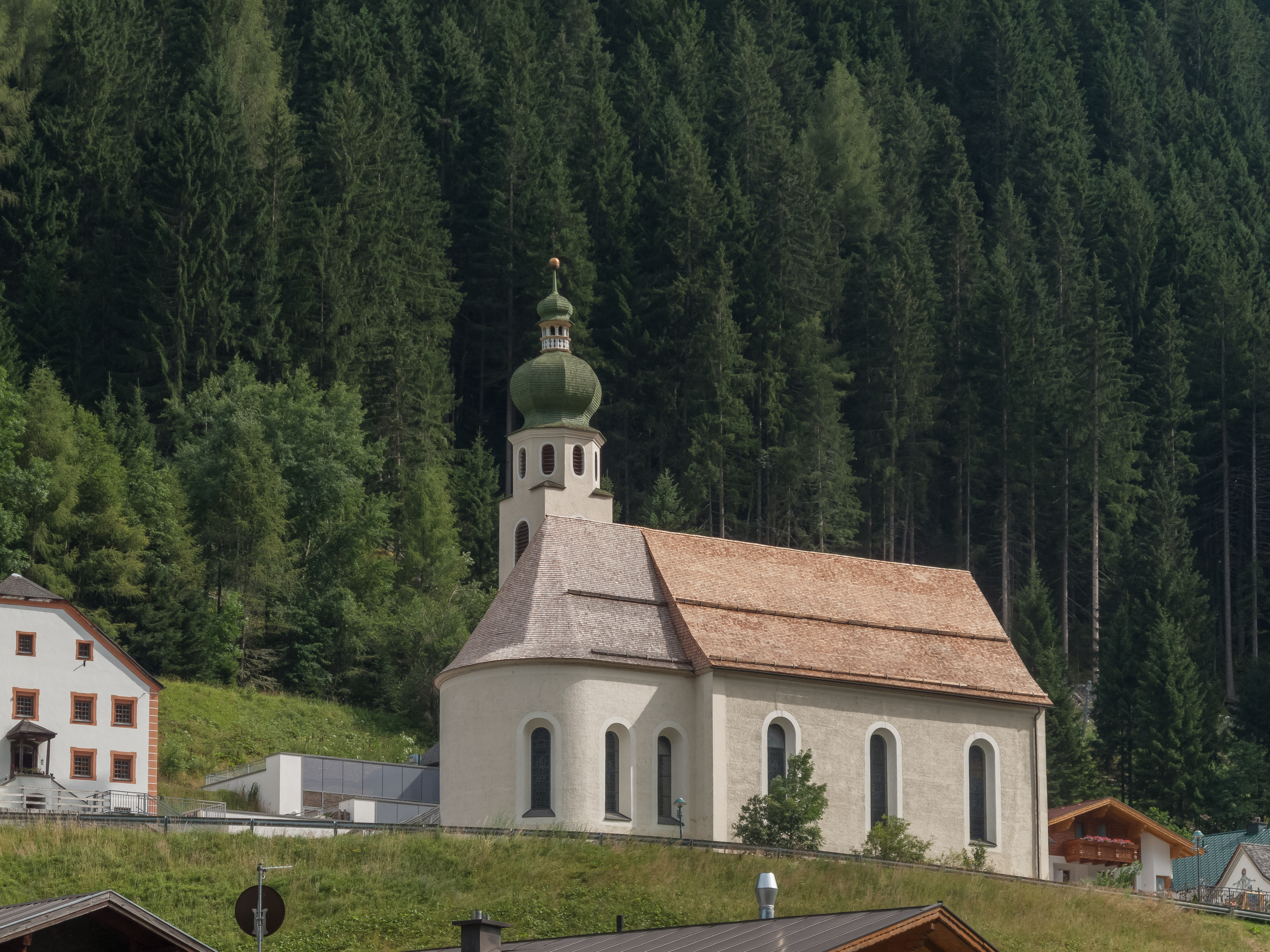
See, church: katholische Pfarrkirche heilige Sebastian

See is a municipality in the district of Landeck in the Austrian state of Tyrol located 8 km southwest of the city of Landeck. The village was founded in 1400 by farmers. Nowadays, tourism is the main source of income.
