= Kaunerberg =

- Municipality
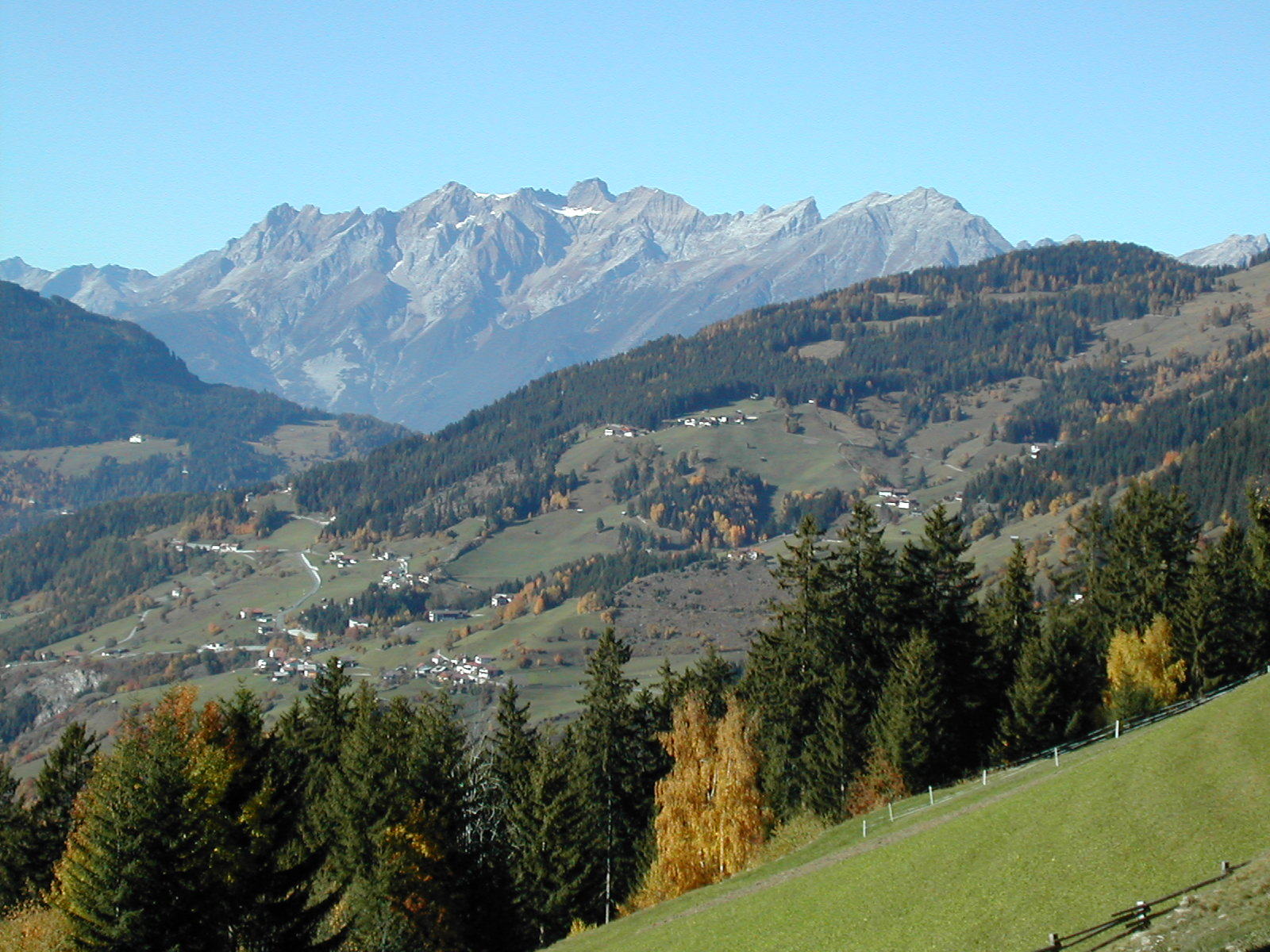
- Remote view of Kaunerberg

- Coat of arms

- Location within Austria
- Coordinates: 47°04′53″N 10°42′44″E
- Country: Austria
- State: Tyrol
- District: Landeck

Government
  - Mayor: Peter Moritz (ÖVP)

Area
  - Total: 23.45 km^{2} (9.05 sq mi)
- Elevation: 1,297 m (4,255 ft)

Population (2021)
  - Total: 437
  - Density: 18.6/km^{2} (48.3/sq mi)
- Time zone: UTC+1 (CET)
  - Summer (DST): UTC+2 (CEST)
- Postal code: 6522
- Area code: 05472
- Vehicle registration: LA
- Website: www.kaunerberg.tirol.gv.at

Kaunerberg is a municipality in the district of Landeck in the Austrian state of Tyrol located 12.6 km southeast of Landeck in a valley with the same name at the upper course of the Inn River. The main source of income is agriculture.
