= Landeck =

- Municipality
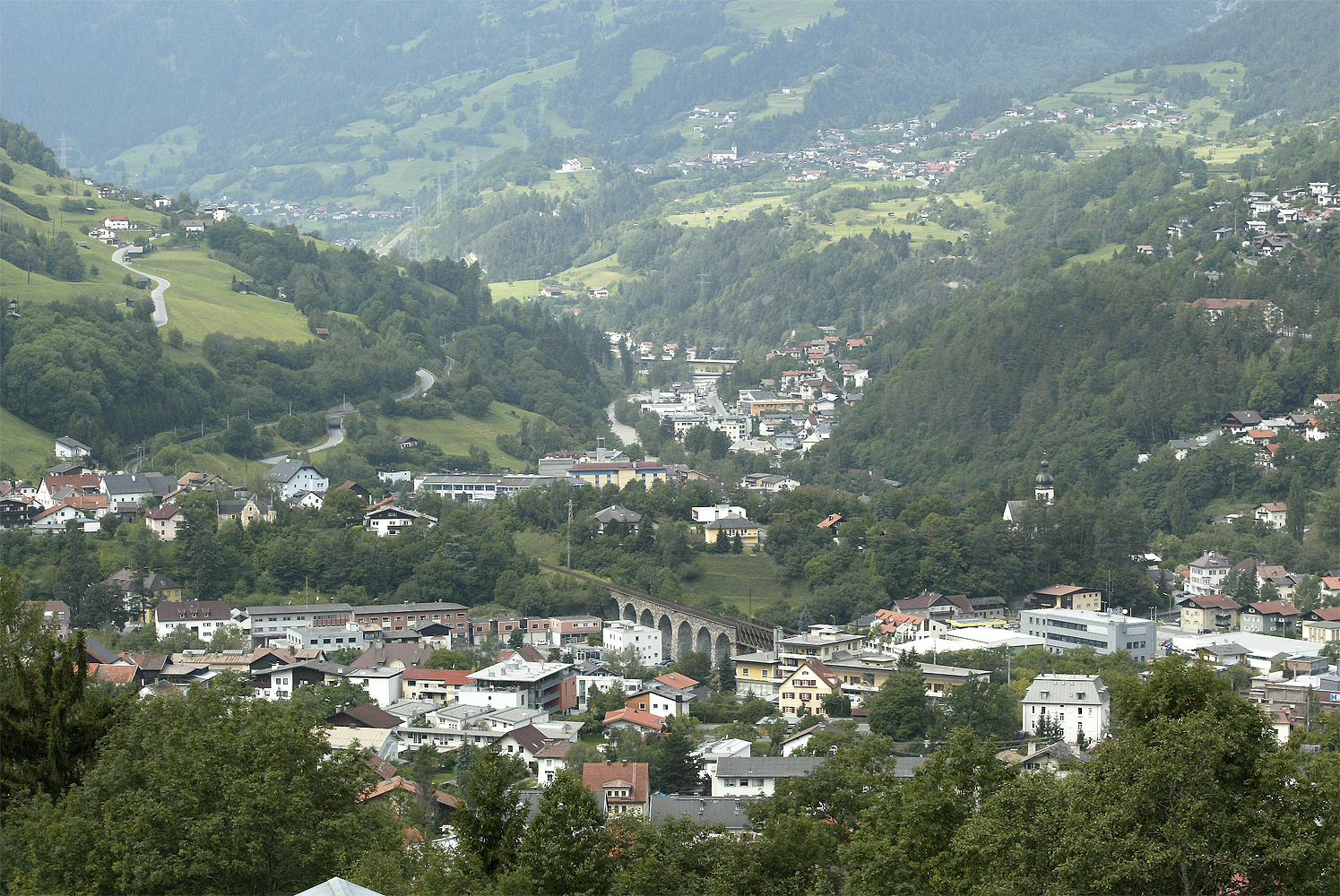

- Coat of arms

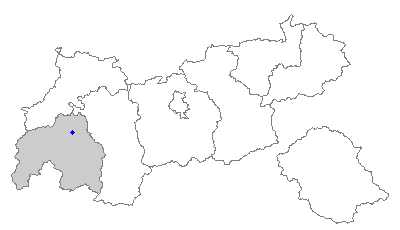
- Location of Landeck within Tyrol

- Location within Austria Landeck (Austria)
- Coordinates: 47°08′00″N 10°34′00″E
- Country: Austria
- State: Tyrol
- District: Landeck

Government
  - Mayor: Wolfgang Jörg (ÖVP)

Area
  - Total: 15.87 km^{2} (6.13 sq mi)
- Elevation: 816 m (2,677 ft)

Population (2018-01-01)
  - Total: 7,725
  - Density: 486.8/km^{2} (1,261/sq mi)
- Time zone: UTC+1 (CET)
  - Summer (DST): UTC+2 (CEST)
- Postal code: 6500
- Area code: 05442
- Vehicle registration: LA
- Website: www.landeck.gv.at

Landeck (German pronunciation: [ˈlandɛk]) is a city in the Austrian state of Tyrol, the capital of the district of Landeck.

== Geography ==
Landeck is located in the Tyrolean Oberland in the west of the state at an elevation of about 820 m (2,690 ft). The town is situated in the valley of the Inn River at the confluence with the Sanna tributary, between the Lechtal Alps, part of the Northern Limestone Alps in the north, and the Ötztal Alps and Samnaun Alps ranges of the Central Eastern Alps in the south.

The Inn valley is an important transport route from Tyrol to the west across the Arlberg massif. In the south, the Reschen Pass at the main chain of the Alps leads to the Vinschgau region in Italian South Tyrol.

=== Climate ===
Climate data for Landeck (1971–2000)
Month	Jan	Feb	Mar	Apr	May	Jun	Jul	Aug	Sep	Oct	Nov	Dec	Year
Record high °C (°F)	16.3 (61.3)	18.9 (66.0)	23.7 (74.7)	27.0 (80.6)	31.6 (88.9)	33.5 (92.3)	37.2 (99.0)	35.8 (96.4)	31.4 (88.5)	25.8 (78.4)	20.4 (68.7)	16.5 (61.7)	37.2 (99.0)
Mean daily maximum °C (°F)	2.6 (36.7)	6.0 (42.8)	11.0 (51.8)	14.5 (58.1)	19.8 (67.6)	22.3 (72.1)	24.6 (76.3)	24.1 (75.4)	20.4 (68.7)	15.2 (59.4)	7.1 (44.8)	2.7 (36.9)	14.2 (57.6)
Daily mean °C (°F)	−1.4 (29.5)	0.3 (32.5)	4.2 (39.6)	7.6 (45.7)	12.7 (54.9)	15.3 (59.5)	17.4 (63.3)	16.8 (62.2)	13.2 (55.8)	8.5 (47.3)	2.5 (36.5)	−0.6 (30.9)	8.0 (46.4)
Mean daily minimum °C (°F)	−4.1 (24.6)	−3.3 (26.1)	−0.1 (31.8)	2.7 (36.9)	7.1 (44.8)	9.8 (49.6)	11.8 (53.2)	11.8 (53.2)	8.8 (47.8)	4.6 (40.3)	−0.4 (31.3)	−3.1 (26.4)	3.8 (38.8)
Record low °C (°F)	−20.5 (−4.9)	−17.1 (1.2)	−17.0 (1.4)	−6.0 (21.2)	−3.6 (25.5)	0.5 (32.9)	4.0 (39.2)	3.4 (38.1)	−1.4 (29.5)	−5.5 (22.1)	−14.5 (5.9)	−18.5 (−1.3)	−20.5 (−4.9)
Average precipitation mm (inches)	43.5 (1.71)	44.3 (1.74)	43.1 (1.70)	37.0 (1.46)	59.3 (2.33)	94.8 (3.73)	106.0 (4.17)	107.1 (4.22)	67.3 (2.65)	46.4 (1.83)	54.9 (2.16)	49.9 (1.96)	753.6 (29.67)
Average snowfall cm (inches)	28.5 (11.2)	34.9 (13.7)	12.5 (4.9)	2.3 (0.9)	0.0 (0.0)	0.0 (0.0)	0.0 (0.0)	0.0 (0.0)	0.0 (0.0)	0.3 (0.1)	12.6 (5.0)	21.3 (8.4)	112.4 (44.3)
Average precipitation days (≥ 1.0 mm)	6.9	6.0	6.7	7.0	10.4	12.6	13.0	13.2	9.3	6.9	8.1	7.8	107.9
Average relative humidity (%) (at 14:00)	63.7	52.8	44.3	43.0	44.8	48.1	48.0	50.5	50.5	53.7	64.1	69.5	52.8
Mean monthly sunshine hours	71.6	103.1	148.0	147.1	183.8	160.9	191.0	191.5	158.9	131.8	74.1	44.6	1,606.4
Source: Central Institute for Meteorology and Geodynamics

== History ==
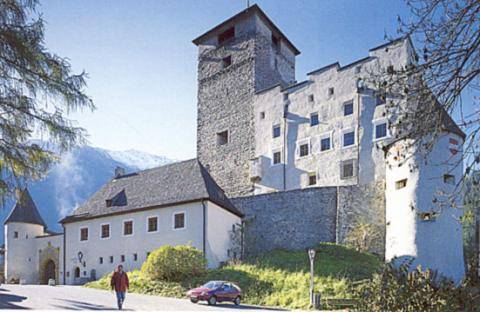
Landeck Castle

In ancient times, the Via Claudia Augusta ran across the Reschen Pass and through the Inn Valley Landeck, connecting the Roman Italia peninsula with the Raetia province conquered in 15 BC. Throughout the Middle Ages the valley remained an important junction of trade routes leading to Augsburg via the Fern Pass and westwards across the Arlberg. From the late 13th century onwards the Meinhardiner counts of Tyrol controlled the area from their stronghold at Landeck Castle.

Until 1867 Landeck (then spelled Landek) formed part of the Habsburg monarchy (Austrian Empire from 1804), except for a short period during the Napoleonic wars (1806-1814) when it was ceded to the Kingdom of Bavaria along with the rest of Tyrol. From 1867 (following the compromise of 1867) it formed part of the Cisleithanian (Austrian) part of Austria-Hungary; the spelling was also changed to Landeck in that year. After 1893 the name was officially changed again to Landeck in Tirol. Throughout these periods it was the capital of the district of the same name, one of the 21 Bezirkshauptmannschaften in the Tyrol province.

From 1782 a first pass road was built across the Arlberg at the behest of Emperor Joseph II; it was significantly enlarged until 1824. Landeck received access to the Arlberg railway in 1883. In 1904 it was elevated to the status of a market town, and finally was granted town privileges in 1923.

Landeck was also used as a military base for Austrian mountain troops before the second world war, later, they became a unit of the German Wehrmacht.

During the Austrian Anschluss to Nazi Germany, Landeck was merged with neighboring Zams in 1939; however, both municipalities again split after World War II. Landeck was also the site of a UNRRA displaced person camp in the French sector of Allied-occupied Austria.

== Population ==
Historical population
Year	Pop.	±%
1869	1,398	—
1880	1,537	+9.9%
1890	1,944	+26.5%
1900	2,227	+14.6%
1910	3,569	+60.3%
1923	4,106	+15.0%
1934	4,113	+0.2%
1939	5,542	+34.7%
1951	5,615	+1.3%
1961	6,514	+16.0%
1971	7,475	+14.8%
1981	7,317	−2.1%
1991	7,411	+1.3%
2001	7,632	+3.0%
2011	7,713	+1.1%

== Personalities ==
- Raoul Schrott (born 1964), author
- Anna Schuppe (1829-1903), author and composer

== Transport ==
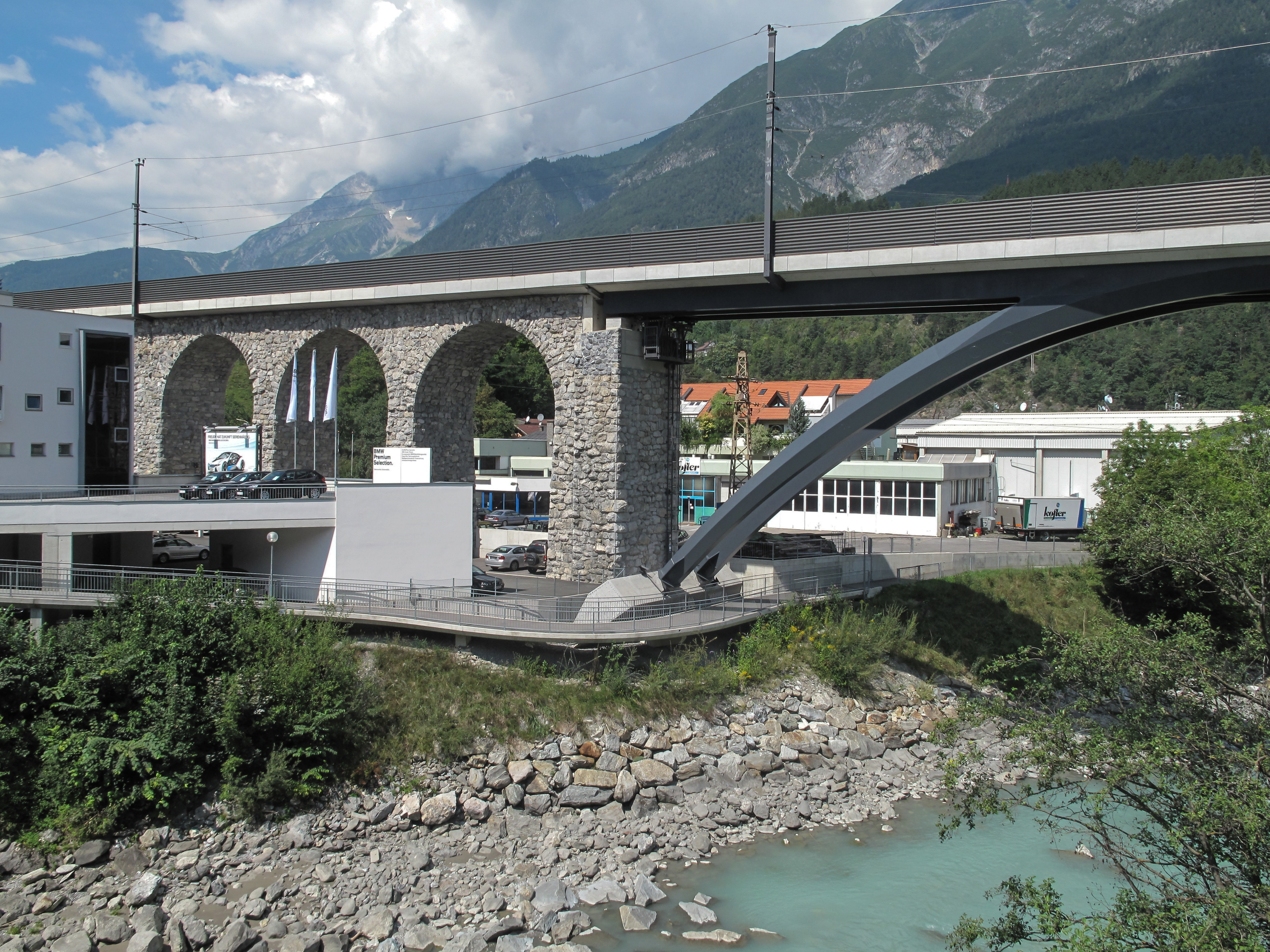
Landeck, viaduct in the town

Landeck-Zams station is an important hub for regional coach lines as well as a noteworthy stop for international trains on the Arlberg railway from the Tyrolean capital Innsbruck via the Arlberg Railway Tunnel to Bludenz in Vorarlberg. Landeck is also the terminus of the parallel Inn Valley Autobahn, which continues as S 16 Schnellstraße to the Arlberg Road Tunnel in the west.
