= Innsbruck Hötting railway station =

Railway station in Tyrol, Austria

Innsbruck Hötting
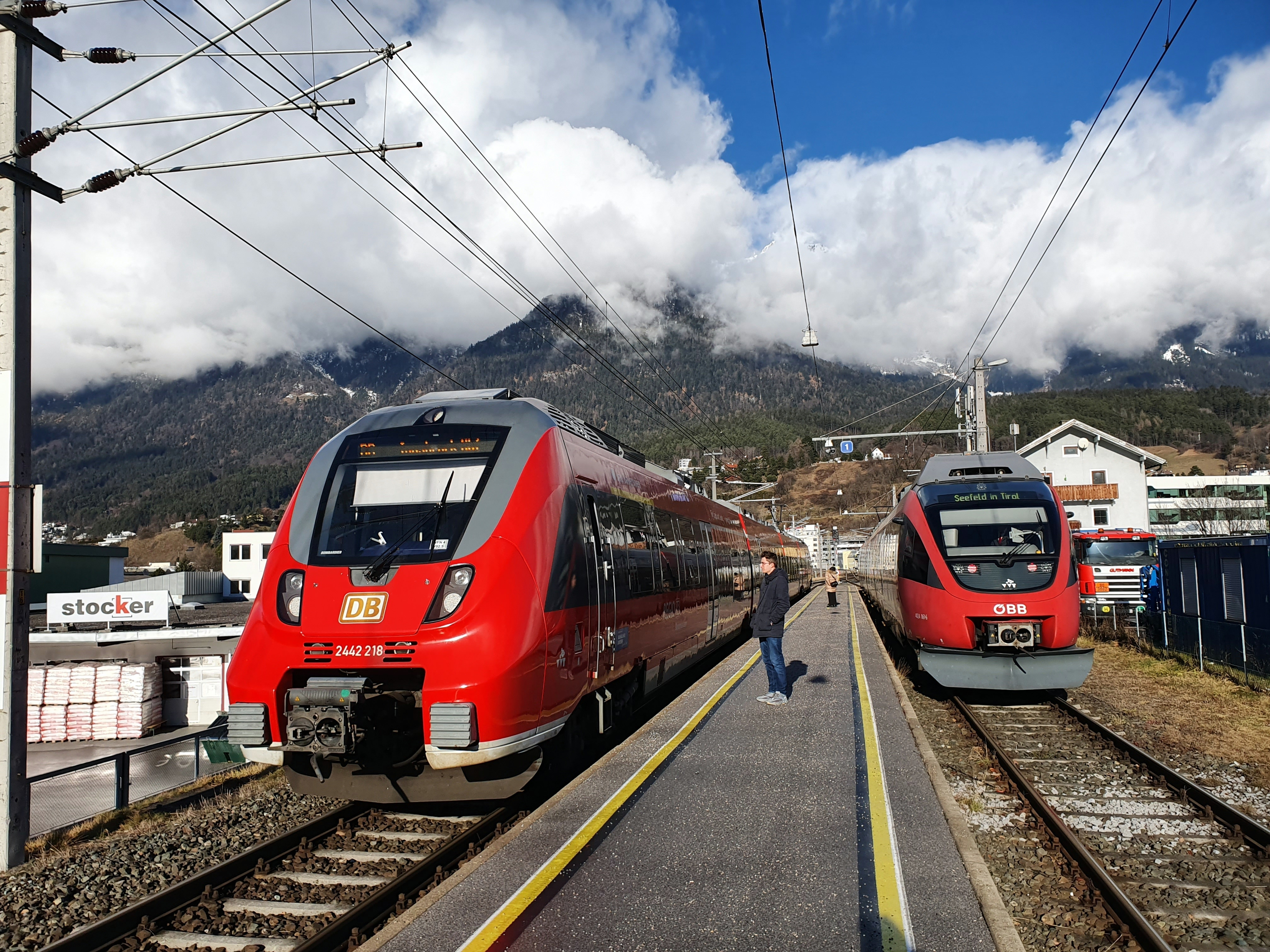
- The island platform with a DB train from Munich to Innsbruck on the left and an ÖBB train from Innsbruck to Seefeld on the right

General information
- Location: 6020 Innsbruck, Austria; Tirol; Austria
- Coordinates: 47°15′42″N 11°22′26″E
- Owner: ÖBB
- Operator: ÖBB Infra
- Line: Mittenwald Railway
- Platforms: 1 island platform
- Tracks: 2
- Train operators: ÖBB, DB Regio Bayern

Other information
- Fare zone: VVT

History
- Opened: 1 July 1912; 114 years ago

Services
Preceding station	Tyrol S-Bahn	Following station
Allerheiligenhöfe towards Garmisch-Partenkirchen	S6	Innsbruck Westbf towards Innsbruck Hbf
Location
- Location within Austria Location within Europe

Innsbruck Hötting railway station (German: Innsbruck Hötting Bahnhof) is a railway station in the borough of Hötting in Innsbruck, the capital city of the Austrian state of Tyrol. It is the first station on the Mittenwald Railway (Karwendelbahn) north of Innsbruck West station (de), where the line branches off the Arlberg railway. The station was opened in 1912 and is served by trains operated by both Deutsche Bahn and Austrian Federal Railways (ÖBB).

The station is 1.8 kilometres from Innsbruck West station. The travel time to Innsbruck Main station is 7 minutes, the travel time to Seefeld is 30 minutes.

== Description ==
The station lies in Hötting, to the west of the town centre, between Fürstenweg, to which it is connected by a pedestrian path, and Ampfererstraße from which there is car access. Is it geographically the closest rail station to the Innsbruck Airport, from where local bus F travels along Fürstenweg near the station.

The station has two tracks on the both sides of an island passenger platform.

There are plans to move the station to the north, closer to Höttinger Au, where a transfer to the tram network will be possible.

== Rail services ==
As of January 2019, the typical off-peak services from the station are:

- 2 tph (trains per hour) to Innsbruck Main station via Innsbruck West station. This includes Tyrol S-Bahn trains from Seefeld as well as REX trains from Munich or Garmisch-Partenkirchen
- 2 tph to Seefeld, half of which continue to Garmisch-Partenkirchen or further to Munich.
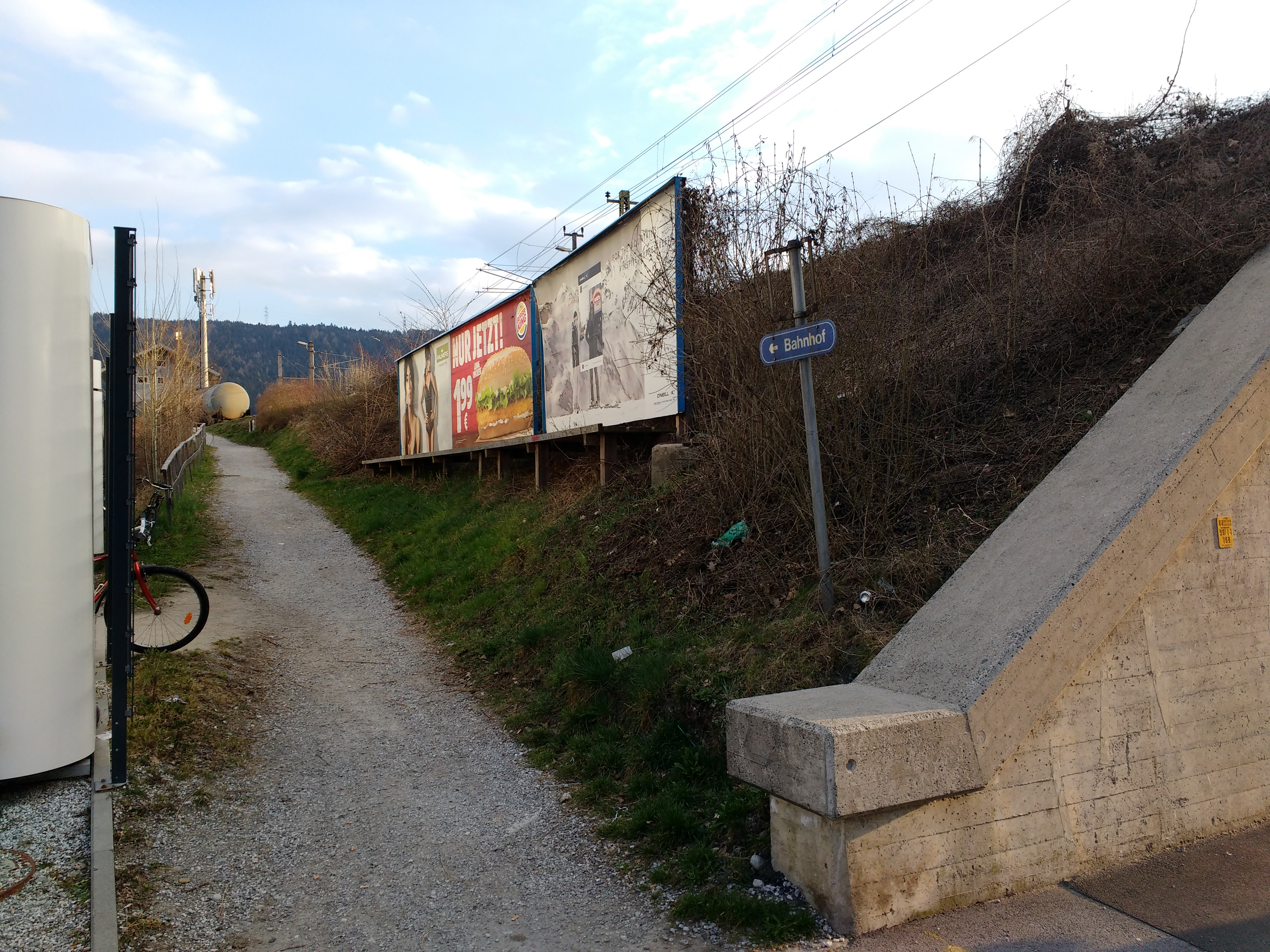
A pedestrian path to Innsbruck Hötting station as seen from Fürstenweg street.
