= Ötztal railway station =

Railway station in Tyrol, Austria

Coordinates: 47.238450°N 10.859510°E

Ötztal
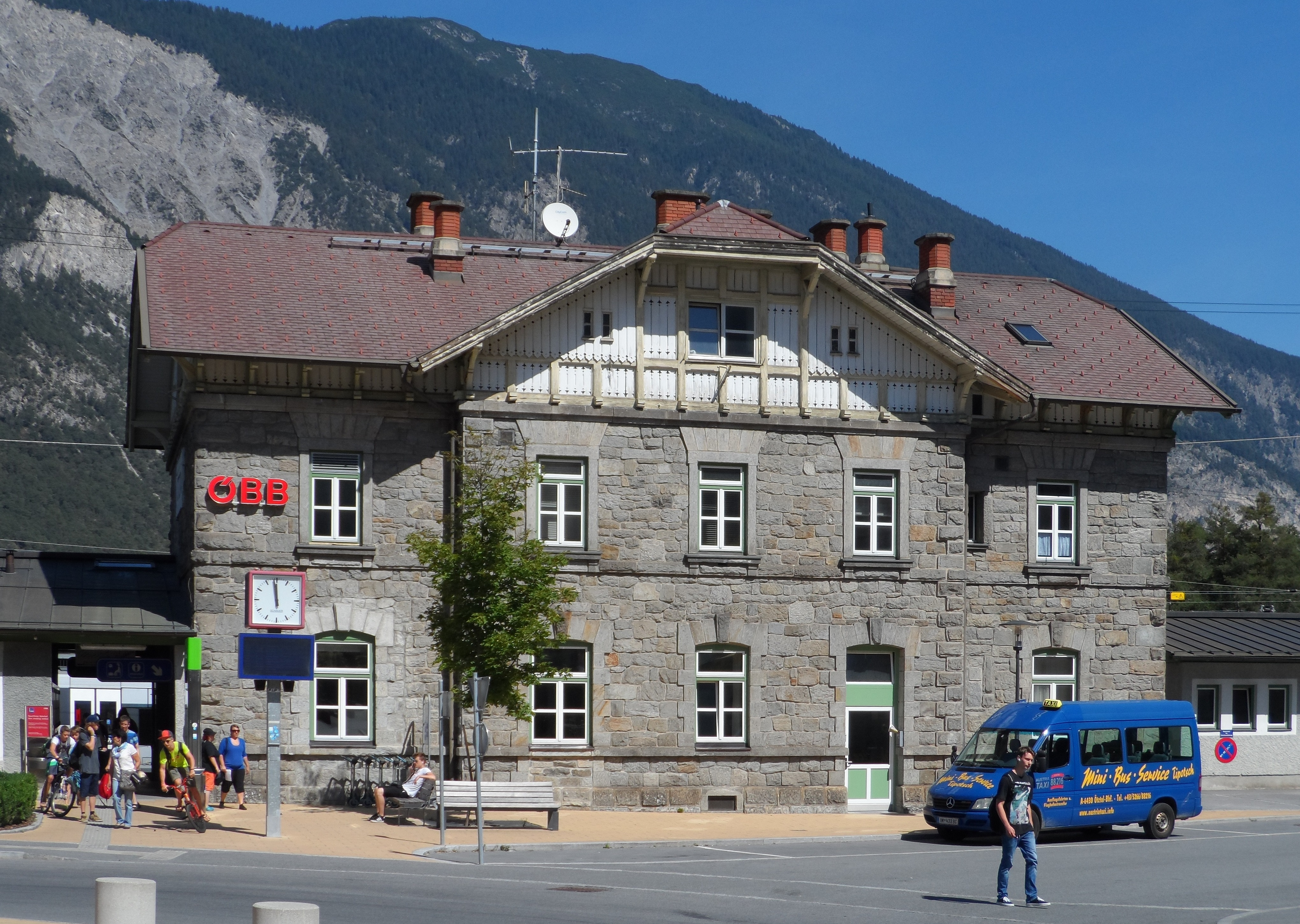
- The station in 2013

General information
- Location: Bahnhofplatz; A-6430 Ötztal; Austria
- Elevation: 692 m (2,270 ft)
- Owner: Austrian Federal Railways (ÖBB)
- Operator: Austrian Federal Railways (ÖBB)
- Line: Arlberg railway
- Platforms: 2 island platforms
- Tracks: 6

Services
Preceding station	ÖBB	Following station
Landeck-Zams towards Zürich HB	Railjet Express	Innsbruck Hbf towards Bratislava hl.st.
Landeck-Zams towards Zürich HB	Railjet Express	Innsbruck Hbf towards Budapest Keleti
Landeck-Zams towards Zürich HB	Railjet Express	Innsbruck Hbf towards Vienna Airport
Landeck-Zams towards Zürich HB	EuroCity (Transalpin)	Innsbruck Hbf towards Graz Hbf
Landeck-Zams towards Dortmund Hbf	InterCity	Telfs-Pfaffenhofen towards Innsbruck Hbf
Preceding station	DB Fernverkehr	Following station
Imst-Pitztal towards St. Anton am Arlberg	ICE 89	Telfs-Pfaffenhofen towards Frankfurt (Main) Hbf
Preceding station	Tyrol S-Bahn	Following station
Landeck-Zams Terminus	REX 1	Schönwies towards Innsbruck Hbf
Terminus	S5	Schönwies towards Jenbach
Location
- Location within Austria Location within Tyrol, Austria

Ötztal is a railway station on the Arlberg railway between Innsbruck and Bludenz in Tyrol, Austria.

In Ötztal, the second track coming from Innsbruck ends and the Arlberg line continues as a single-track railway till Landeck.

== Services ==
=== Rail ===
Ötztal provides regional connections to Innsbruck–Hall in Tirol–Rosenheim and Landeck as well as to international destinations like Zurich, Dortmund and Vienna.

It is serviced by:

- InterCityExpress: Vienna–Innsbruck–Bregenz
- -EuroCity: Vienna/Graz–Innsbruck–Feldkirch–Bregenz/Zürich (CH)
- EuroNight: Vienna/Graz–Innsbruck–Feldkirch–Bregenz/Zurich (CH)
- InterCity: Innsbruck–Dortmund/Münster (D)
- Tyrol S-Bahn: REX 1 S5

=== Bus ===
Coach lines departing from the station forecourt:

- Oetz–Umhausen–Längenfeld–Sölden–Obergurgl
- Oetz–Ochsengarten
- Roppen–Imst
- Haiming–Silz–Mötz

== See also ==
- Arlberg railway
- Ötztal
- Rail transport in Austria
