= Landeck-Zams railway station =

Railway station in Tyrol, Austria

Landeck-Zams
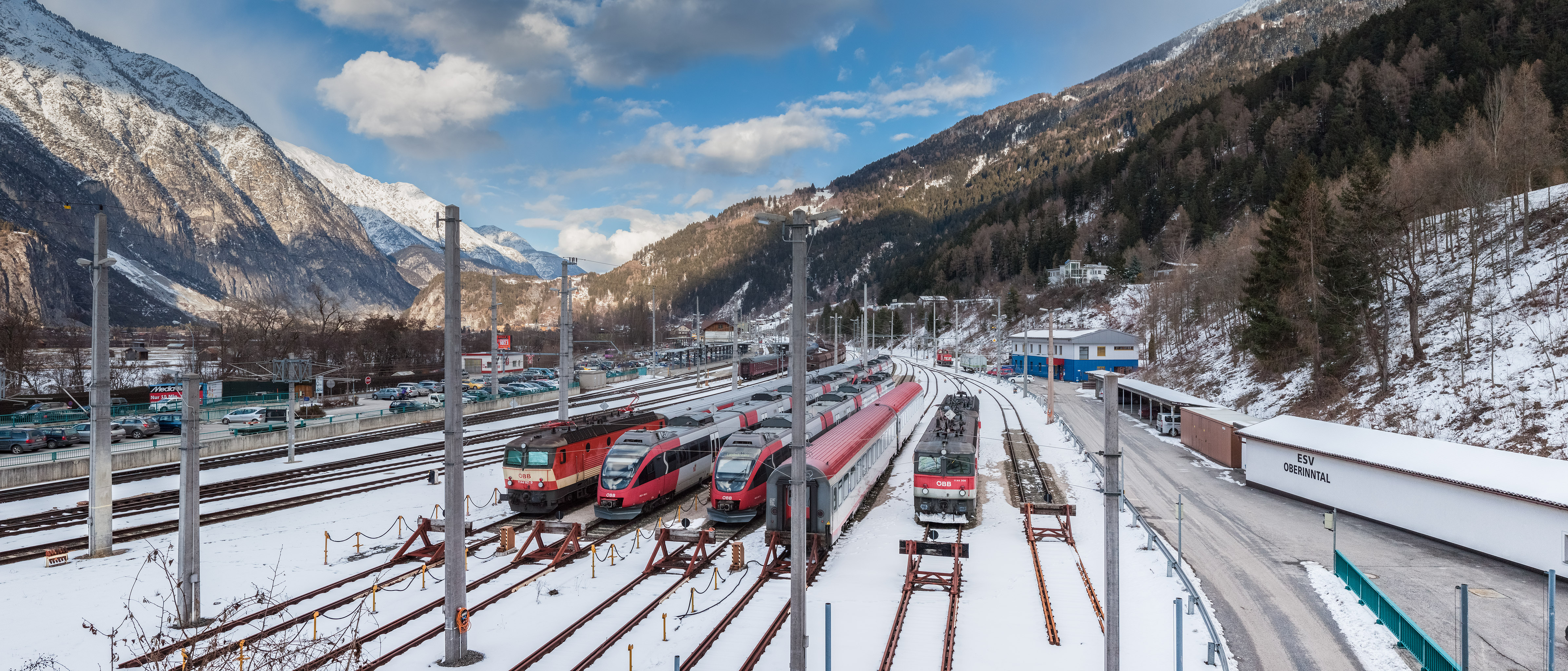

General information
- Location: Bahnhofstraße 20; A-6500 Landeck; Austria
- Coordinates: 47.148472°N 10.578472°E
- Elevation: 776 m (2,546 ft)
- Owner: Austrian Federal Railways (ÖBB)
- Operator: Austrian Federal Railways (ÖBB); WESTbahn
- Line: Arlberg railway
- Platforms: 3
- Connections: S-Bahn: S1 S2; Bus: regional lines

History
- Opened: 1 June 1883
- Electrified: 19 December 1923

Services
Preceding station	ÖBB	Following station
St. Anton am Arlberg towards Zürich HB	Railjet Express	Ötztal towards Bratislava hl.st.
St. Anton am Arlberg towards Zürich HB	Railjet Express	Ötztal towards Budapest Keleti
St. Anton am Arlberg towards Zürich HB	Railjet Express	Ötztal towards Vienna Airport
Langen am Arlberg towards Bregenz	Railjet Express	Imst-Pitztal towards Vienna Airport
Langen am Arlberg towards Bregenz	Railjet	Imst-Pitztal towards Innsbruck Hbf
St. Anton am Arlberg towards Zürich HB	EuroCity (Transalpin)	Ötztal towards Graz Hbf
St. Anton am Arlberg towards Zürich HB	EuroNight	Innsbruck Hbf towards Zagreb
Bludenz towards Zürich HB	EuroNight	Innsbruck Hbf towards Budapest Keleti
Bludenz towards Zürich HB	EuroNight	Innsbruck Hbf towards Praha hl.n.
St. Anton am Arlberg towards Zürich HB	Nightjet	Innsbruck Hbf towards Graz Hbf
Bludenz towards Zürich HB	Nightjet	Innsbruck Hbf towards Wien Hbf
Langen am Arlberg towards Bregenz	Nightjet	Imst-Pitztal towards Wien Hbf
Preceding station	DB Fernverkehr	Following station
St. Anton am Arlberg towards Dortmund Hbf	ICE 62 Bodensee	Innsbruck Hbf Terminus
Preceding station		Following station
St. Anton am Arlberg toward Lindau-Insel	WESTbahn	Imst-Pitztal toward Wien Westbahnhof
Preceding station	Tyrol S-Bahn	Following station
Terminus	REX 1	Schönwies towards Innsbruck Hbf
Location
- Location within Austria Location within Tyrol, Austria

Landeck-Zams railway station, formerly Landeck, is a railway station in the city of Landeck, in the Austrian state of Tyrol. It is located on the Arlberg railway between Innsbruck and Bludenz. It is frequented by more than 2000 travellers a day, whereby a majority of them are commuters that are working or studying in Innsbruck.

== Operation ==
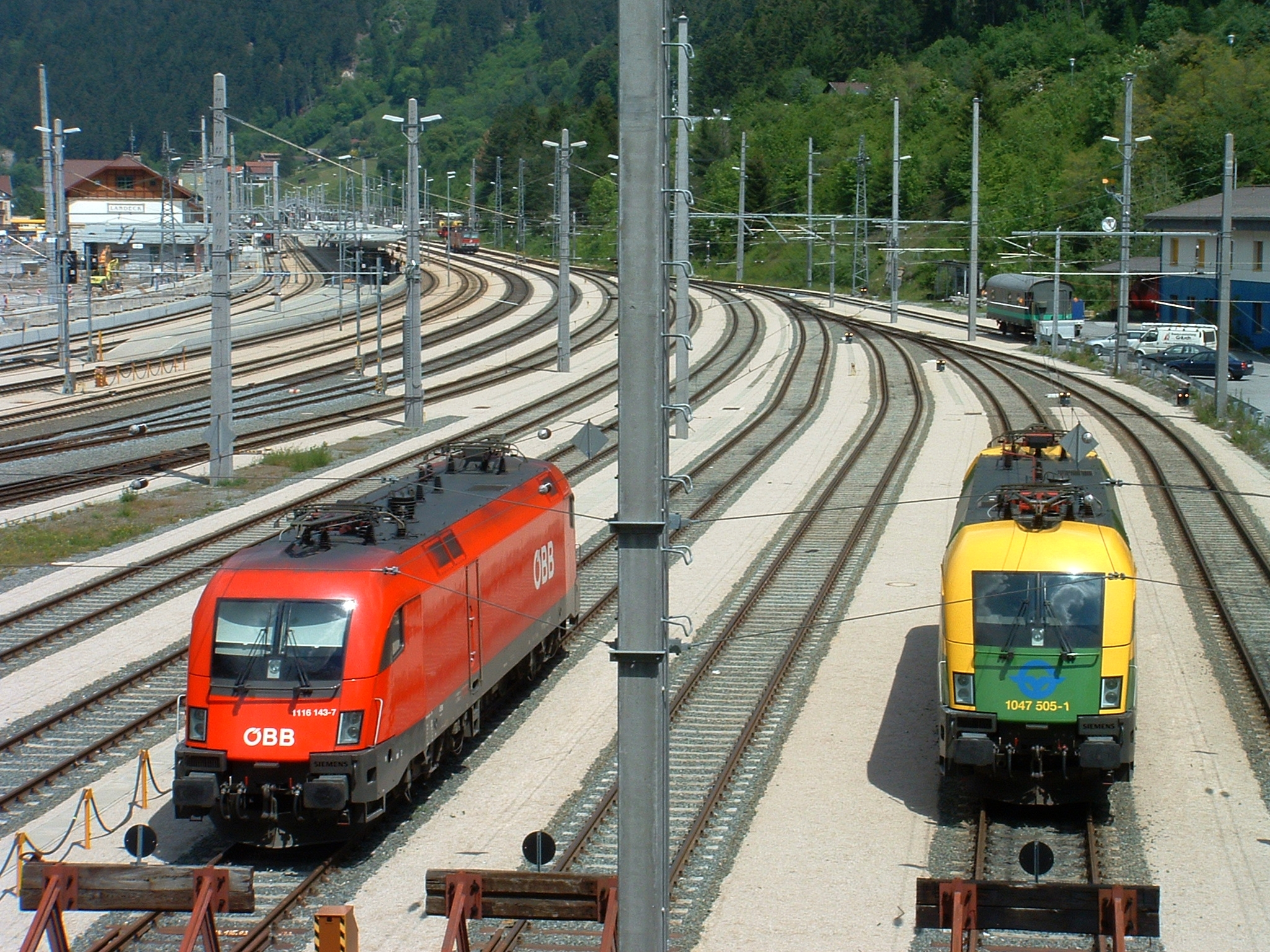
trackage of Landeck-Zams

Beside its function as an important commuter station, Landeck-Zams also serves as an important station for the operations flow on the Arlberg line, since the ramp section of Europe's most difficult mountain railway (max. 26 ‰ on the east- and 31 ‰ on the west-ramp) starts in Landeck. Therefore, banking engines are often coupled (or decoupled) to heavy freight- or passenger trains. Even the Orient Express takes a short stop in Landeck for this reason.

Because of the single track design of the mountain section of the line, a closing between Bludenz and Landeck (sometimes Ötztal) can be necessary in exceptional cases (maintenance works or natural disasters). Passenger transport is then adopted by a rail replacement service. For this reason the station forecourt of Landeck is laid out for offering parking space to enough coaches if necessary.

== Services ==
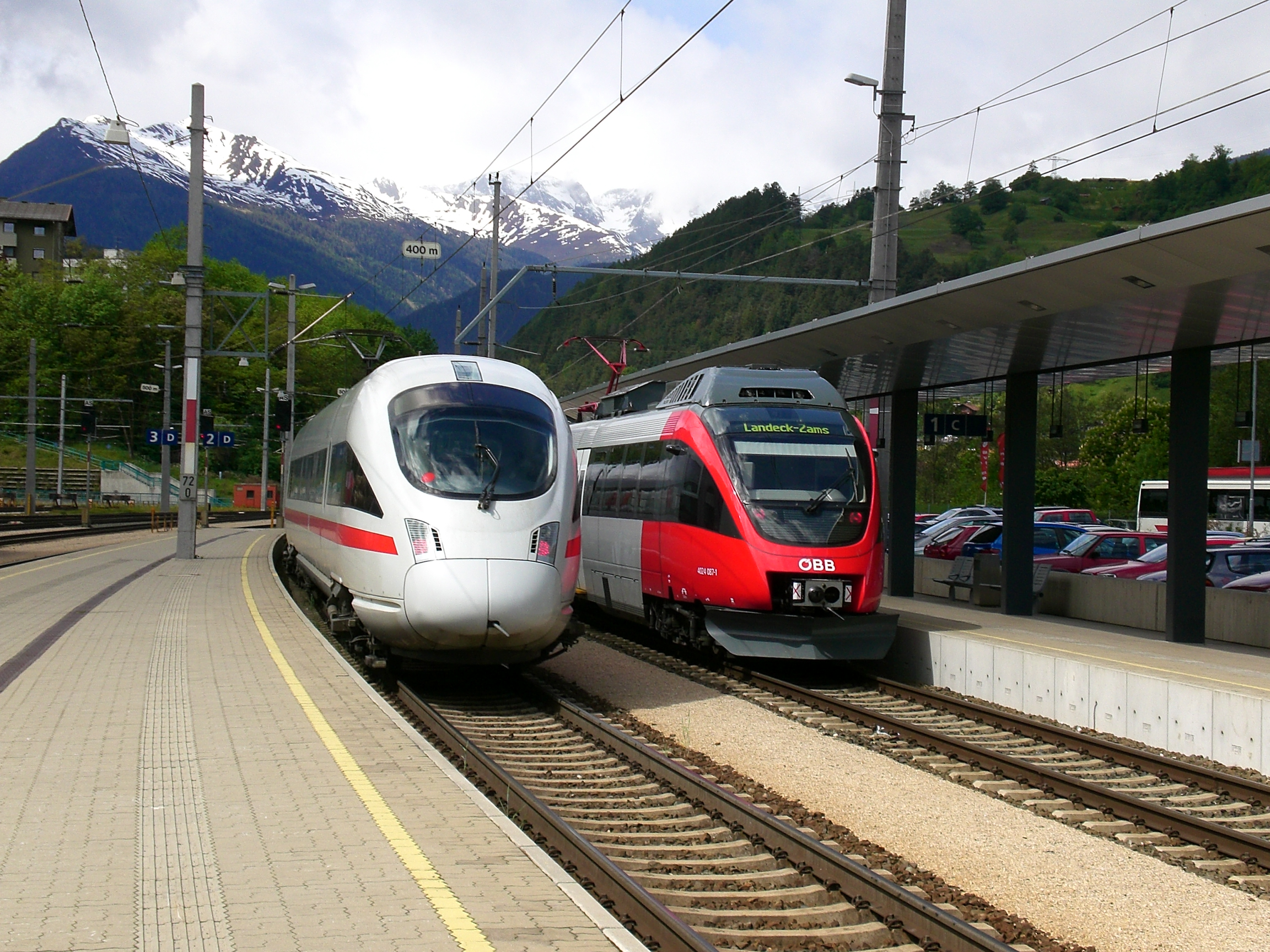
departing InterCityExpress next to a regional train in Landeck-Zams

=== Rail services ===
The most important connections are the bihourly running ÖBB-EuroCity trains from Basel and Zürich, respectively Bregenz to Wien Westbahnhof (Vienna West). Regional trains are only going eastbound to Innsbruck Hauptbahnhof and Hall in Tirol since the regional traffic between Landeck and St. Anton was completely abandoned and displaced by an improved coach service. Once a day there is also a connection to Dortmund in Germany.

In the winter season the station of Landeck is additionally frequented by ski-trains, predominantly from Denmark and the Netherlands. This trains are often stabled in Landeck for the holiday duration of their passengers.

=== Bus services ===
From the station forecourt, which is equipped with a guidance system, are departing urban buses (Landeck–Landeck-Zams –Zams) as well as regional lines.

The following lines depart from Landeck-Zams:

- Pians–Strengen–Flirsch–Pettneu am Arlberg–St. Anton am Arlberg
- Pians–See–Kappl–Ischgl–Galtür–Bielerhöhe
- Prutz–Ried im Oberinntal–Tösens–Pfunds–(Martina, Switzerland: connection to Scuol)/Nauders: connection to Mals, Italy
- Prutz–Ried im Oberinntal–Ladis–Fiss–Serfaus
- Zams–Schönwies–Mils bei Imst–Imst
- Fließ
- Grins
- Stanz bei Landeck

== See also ==
- Arlberg railway
- Landeck
- Rail transport in Austria
