= Kitzbühel railway station =

Railway station in Tyrol, Austria

Kitzbühel
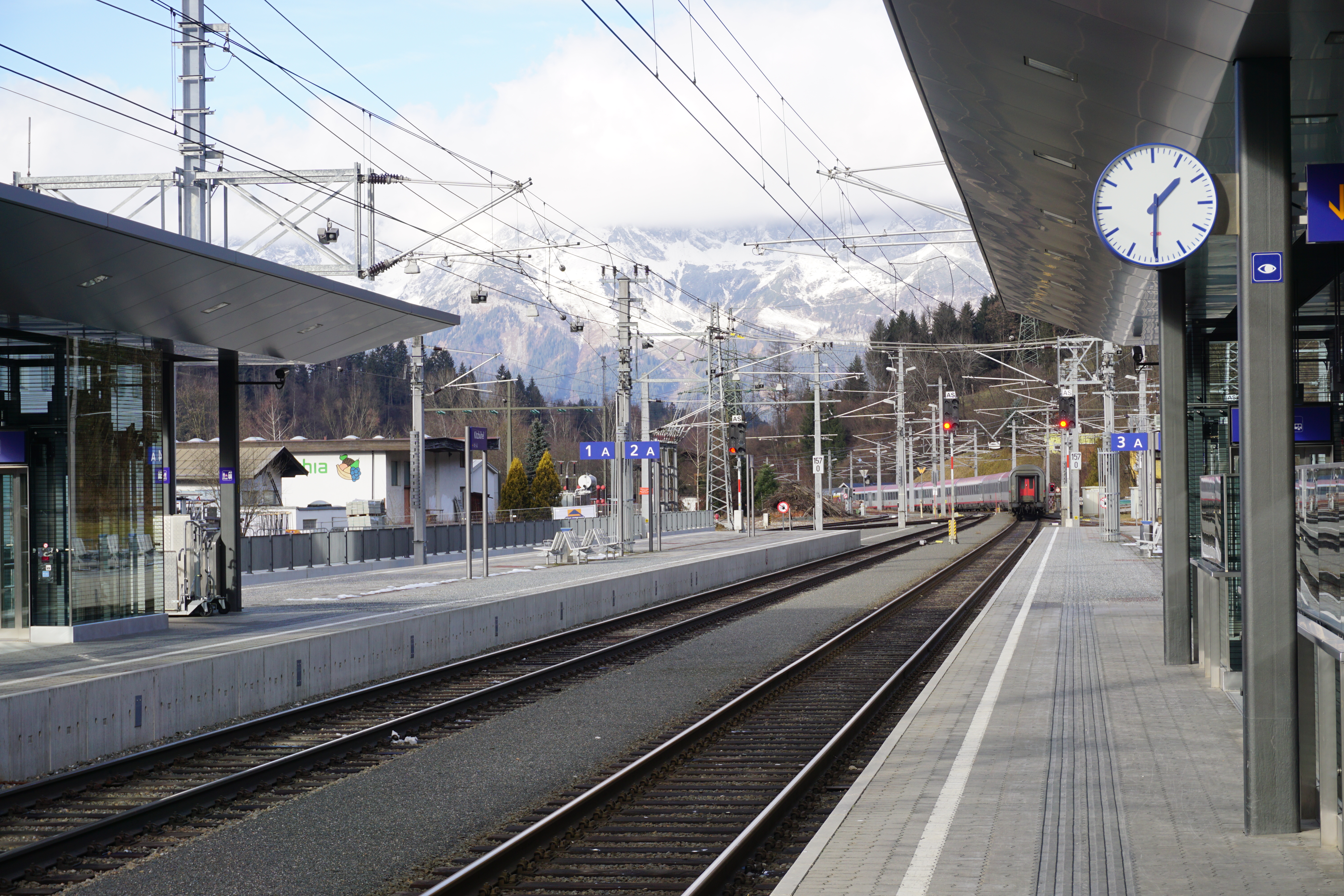

General information
- Other names: Kitzbühel Hauptbahnhof
- Location: Bahnhofplatz 2; 6370 Kitzbühel; Austria
- Coordinates: 47.45207°N 12.3911974°E
- Elevation: 763 m (2,503 ft)
- Owner: Austrian Federal Railways (ÖBB)
- Operator: Austrian Federal Railways (ÖBB)
- Line: Salzburg-Tyrol Railway
- Platforms: 4

Services
| Preceding station | ÖBB | Following station |
|---|---|---|
| Kirchberg in Tirol towards Zürich HB | EuroCity (Transalpin) | St. Johann in Tirol towards Graz Hbf |
| Preceding station | Tyrol S-Bahn | Following station |
| Kitzbühel Hahnenkamm towards Wörgl Hbf | REX 3 | St. Johann in Tirol towards Saalfelden |
| Kitzbühel Hahnenkamm towards Wörgl Hbf | S8 | Oberndorf in Tirol towards Hochfilzen |
Location
- Location within Tyrol, Austria Location within Austria

Kitzbühel railway station, sometimes known as Kitzbühel Hauptbahnhof (German for Kitzbühel Central) to distinguish it from nearby Hahnenkamm and Schwarzsee stations, is the main railway station for the resort town of Kitzbühel, Tyrol, Austria. The station is a major stop for local, regional and international services on the Salzburg-Tyrol railway, served by the Tyrol S-Bahn, Regional-Express (REX) and some EuroCity (EC) services.

The station was rebuilt in 2010. It is served daily by the Transalpin service from Zurich Hauptbahnhof to Graz Hauptbahnhof.

== See also ==
- Rail transport in Austria
