= Transalpin =

EuroCity express train

Transalpin (2013)
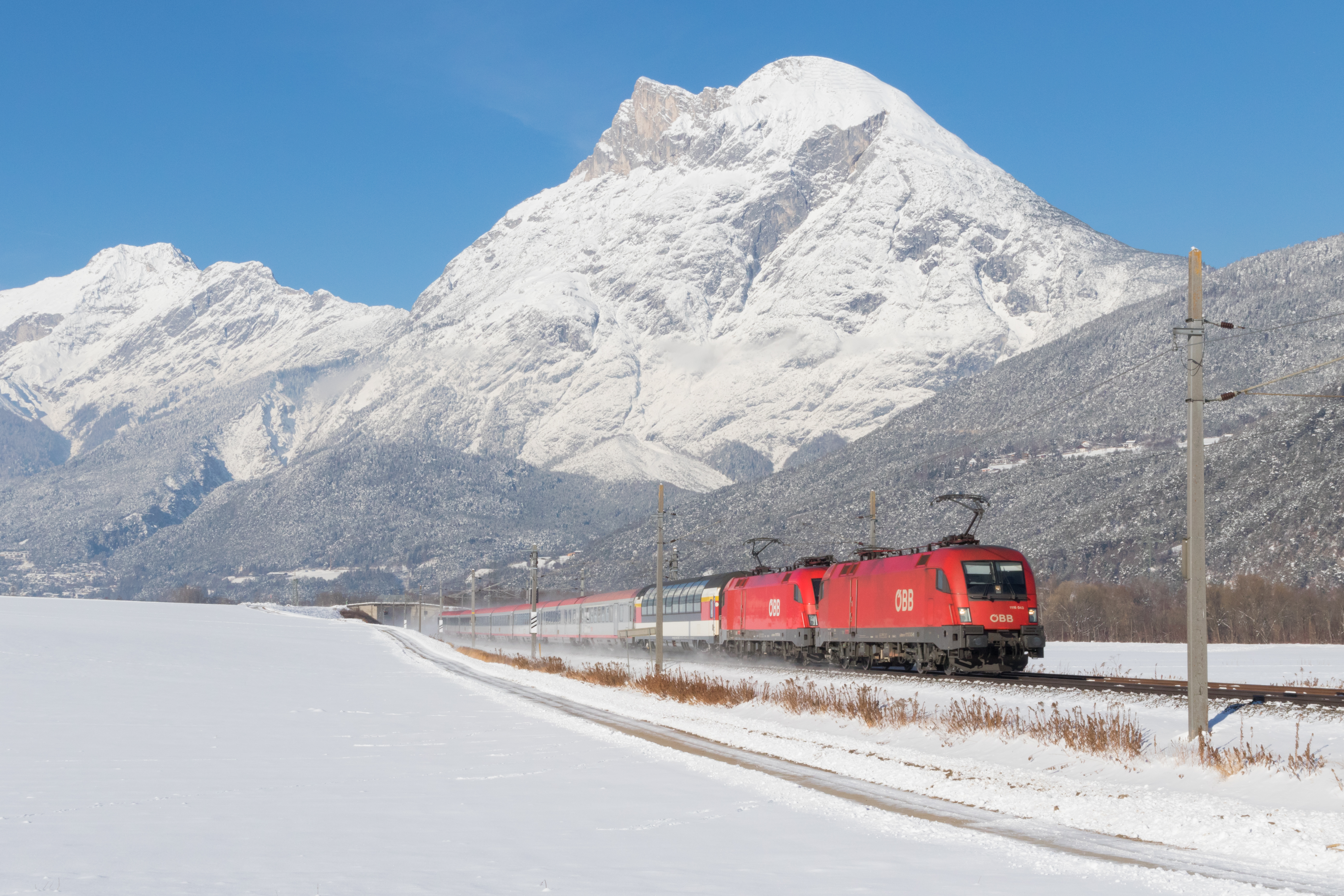
- EC 163 passes Hohe Munde

Overview
- Service type: EuroCity
- Status: Operational
- Locale: Austria; Switzerland
- First service: 15 December 2013
- Current operators: ÖBB; SBB-CFF-FFS

Route
- Termini: Zürich HB; Graz Hbf
- Stops: 27
- Average journey time: 9 h 34 min
- Service frequency: Daily
- Train number: EC 163/164

On-board services
- Classes: first and second class
- Disabled access: wheelchair space
- Seating arrangements: open, 6-seat compartments
- Catering facilities: dining car
- Baggage facilities: bicycle conveyance

Technical
- Track gauge: 1,435 mm (4 ft 8 1/2 in)
- Electrification: 15 kV AC, 16.7 Hz
- Operating speed: 200 km/h

The Transalpin is a EuroCity express train linking Zürich (Switzerland) with Graz (Austria) via Liechtenstein. Introduced in 2013, it is operated by the Austrian Federal Railways (ÖBB) and the Swiss Federal Railways (SBB-CFF-FFS). From 1958 to 2010 a train of the same name linked Basel or Zürich with Vienna (see history below).

The name of the train alludes to the fact that it crosses the Alps. Transalpin was also the Ancient Roman word meaning "behind the Alps", and referring to the region of that name in northern Switzerland.

== Route ==
The train takes 9 h 34 min from Zurich to Graz (9 h 35 min in the other direction) and stops at Sargans, Buchs SG, Feldkirch, Bludenz, Langen am Arlberg, St. Anton am Arlberg, Landeck-Zams, Imst-Pitztal, Ötztal, Innsbruck, Jenbach, Wörgl, Kirchberg in Tirol, Kitzbühel, St. Johann in Tirol, Saalfelden, Zell am See, Schwarzach-St. Veit, St. Johann im Pongau, Bischofshofen, Radstadt, Schladming, Stainach-Irdning, Liezen, Selzthal, St. Michael in Obersteiermark, and Leoben. In Buchs SG (border checkpoint) and Selzthal, the train changes its direction of travel.

== Train formation ==
In the timetable period 2025/2026 the EC Transalpin is composed of air-conditioned rolling stock of the SBB CFF FFS: first and second class open coaches, a panorama coach and a dining car operated by the Austrian caterer DoN. The ÖBB provide additional second class cars on weekends of high demand. Several of the coaches allow the transportation of bicycles or are accessible for passengers in wheelchairs.

Between Zürich and Buchs, the train is usually pulled by a locomotive of SBB CFF FFS class Re 460. Between Buchs and Graz, a locomotive of ÖBB class 1016 or 1116 is used, with another locomotive of the same class added in front between Buchs and Innsbruck.

== History ==
Transalpin (1958—2010)
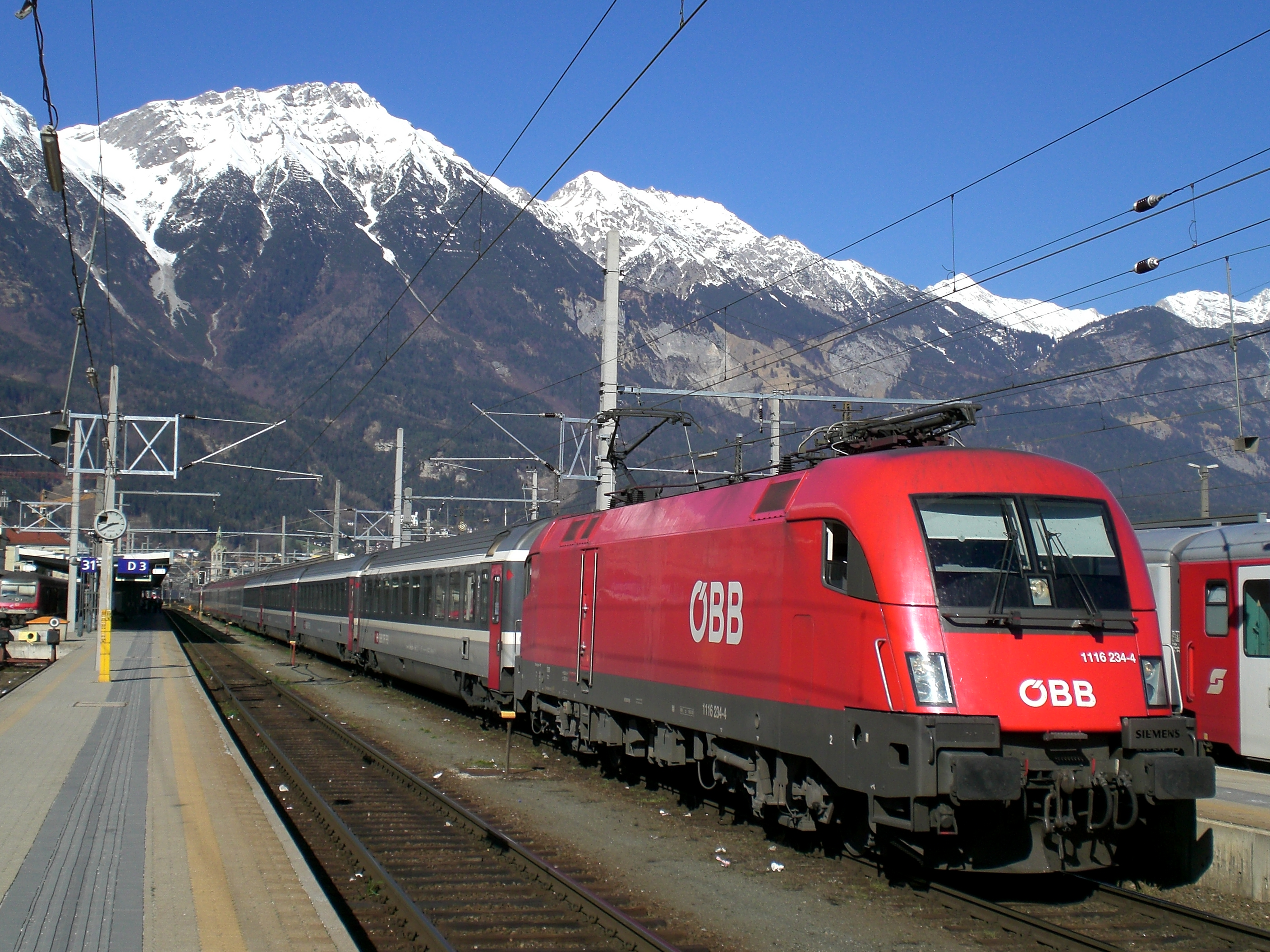
- ÖBB EC 162 in Innsbruck Hbf

Overview
- Service type: Triebwagenschnellzug (1958–1977); Expresszug (1977–1987); EuroCity (1987–2010); ÖBB-EuroCity
- Status: Discontinued
- Locale: Austria; Switzerland
- First service: 1 June 1958
- Last service: 13 June 2010
- Successor: Railjet
- Former operators: ÖBB; SBB-CFF-FFS

Route
- Termini: Wien Westbf; Zürich HB / Basel SBB
- Service frequency: Daily
- Train numbers: TS 11/12; TS 462/463; Ex 462/463; EC 62, 63; EC 162/ÖBB-EC 162; EC 163/ÖBB-EC 163

Technical
- Track gauge: 1,435 mm (4 ft 8 1/2 in)
- Electrification: 15 kV AC, 16.7 Hz
Route map
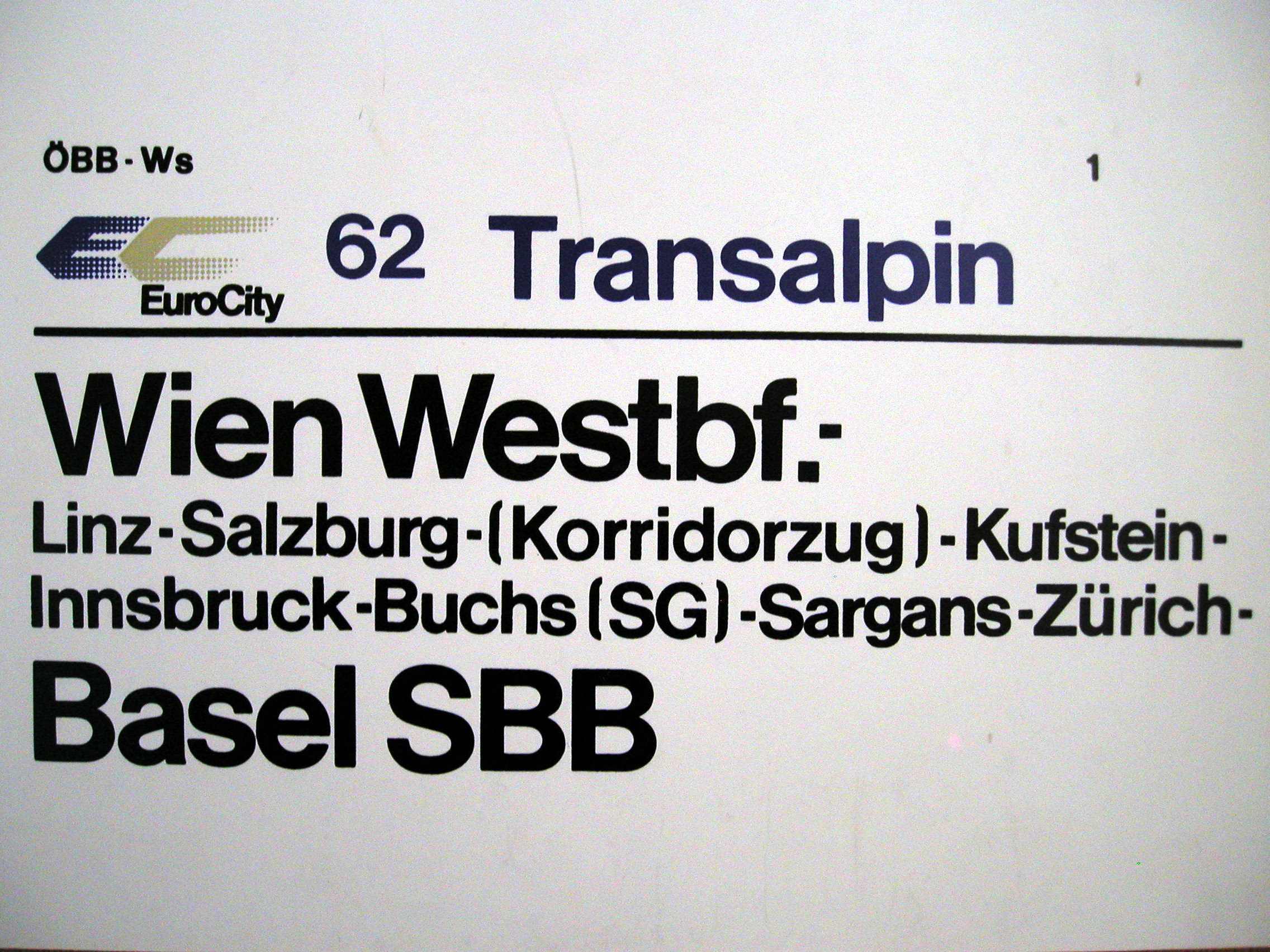

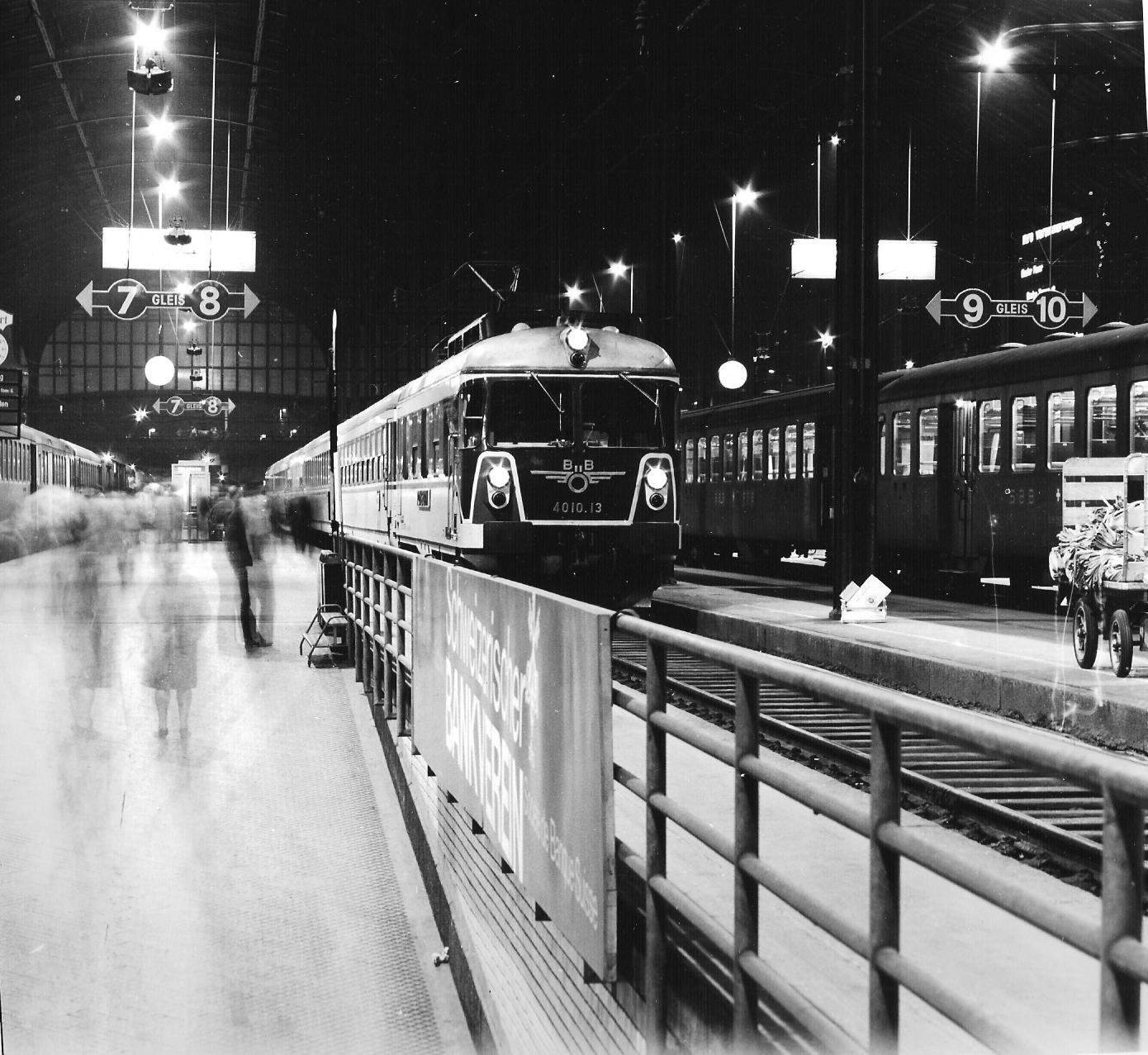
A Class 4010 with the Transalpin at Basel SBB, 1970.

The Transalpin was first introduced in 1958, it was operated by the Austrian Federal Railways (ÖBB) and the Swiss Federal Railways (SBB-CFF-FFS). For most of its life, it ran between Wien Westbf in Vienna, Austria, and Basel SBB in Switzerland. In 1987, it was designated a EuroCity train. In 2008, it was cut back from Basel SBB to Zürich HB, Switzerland. It was discontinued in June 2010, and replaced by a Railjet service.

From 1 June 1958 until 13 June 2010, the Transalpin was a showpiece of the ÖBB and the SBB. Introduced the year after the Trans Europ Express (TEE) network was set up in 1957, it had both first- and second-class accommodation, and therefore did not meet the "first class only" requirements to be a TEE.

Throughout its history, the Transalpin ran daily in both directions. Until the 2000s, it was always one of the fastest railway connections, with the fewest intermediate stops, in its area of operation.

The initial train numbers of the Transalpin were TS 11/12, and its original route was Wien Westbf to Zürich HB. In 1959, the route was extended to Basel (SBB station). When it became a EuroCity train, in 1987, its train numbers became EC 62 westbound and EC 63 eastbound.

To save time and the need for the train to reverse direction during its journey, the Transalpin did not stop at Salzburg Hauptbahnhof initially, but ran via the curve from Elixhausen to Salzburg-Gnigl, and stopped at Salzburg Aigen. Even today, this curve, which is now used mainly by goods trains, is known by the name Transalpin-Schleife (Transalpin curve).

In 1969, the route was changed. From then onwards, the Transalpin ran from the Western Railway at Salzburg Hbf to Wörgl via the Deutsche Bundesbahn (DB)–owned Rosenheim–Salzburg and Rosenheim–Kufstein railways, instead of along the previous route via Bischofshofen and Zell am See (Gisela railway). As the Transalpin had no scheduled stops in Germany, it was operated there as a so-called Korridorzug or "privilege train", a train in which (in the period before the Schengen Agreement) the passport and customs checks that would otherwise be required were not applicable. Until the construction of the "Rosenheim Curve" in 1982, the train had been reversed at Rosenheim.

In 1975, a writer for Fodor's travel guides described the Transalpin as "one of the best trains in Europe for mountain scenery".

In 1980, a trip on the Transalpin from Zürich to Vienna was featured in "Changing Trains", the final episode in Series 1 of Great Railway Journeys of the World, a BBC TV travel documentary. The "Changing Trains" trip, which formed part of a longer journey from Paris to Budapest, was also described in the book published to complement the TV series. In the book, Eric Robson, the presenter and author of "Changing Trains", commented that the Transalpin, as of 1980, was simply the best train that the ÖBB had to offer, "... the star of this single main line to the east."

When the EuroCity network was launched on 31 May 1987, the Transalpin was among the previously existing international express trains to be redesignated as EuroCity trains.

In June 2010, the Transalpin was replaced by the "Railjet 162" and "Railjet 163", which run to approximately the same timetable. In the timetable period 2013/2014, five pairs of Railjets connect Zürich and Vienna.

=== Route (historic) ===
In 2009/2010 the route of the Transalpin was as follows:

- Wien Westbf – Wien Hütteldorf (ÖBB EC 163 only) – St. Pölten Hbf – Linz Hbf – Salzburg Hbf – Innsbruck Hbf – Landeck-Zams – Bludenz – Feldkirch – Buchs – Sargans – Zürich HB

The train reversed its direction at Buchs SG. In the westbound EC 162, the first-class cars were marshalled at the front of the train from Buchs to Zurich, and in the eastbound ÖBB-EC 163, they were at the front of the train from Buchs to Vienna. This arrangement meant that at the two termini, both of which were terminal stations, the first-class cars were always closer to the station concourse.

At times when there were interruptions on the Arlberg line due to railway construction work, or as a consequence of natural disasters – such as avalanches and debris flows, or between August and December 2005 after storm damage – the Transalpin was substantially diverted between Salzburg and Bregenz via München Hbf, the Munich–Buchloe and the Buchloe–Lindau railways.

=== Train formation (historic) ===
Initially, the Transalpin was operated by a four-member fleet of four-car Class 4130 electric multiple units, which had been procured specifically for the purpose. The Class 4130 was a development of the Class 4030, but had a higher capacity and top speed, and its control car was equipped with a kitchen.

In 1965, the ÖBB replaced the Transalpin's Class 4130s with three six-car Class 4010 multiple units, which, again, had been procured specifically for the purpose.

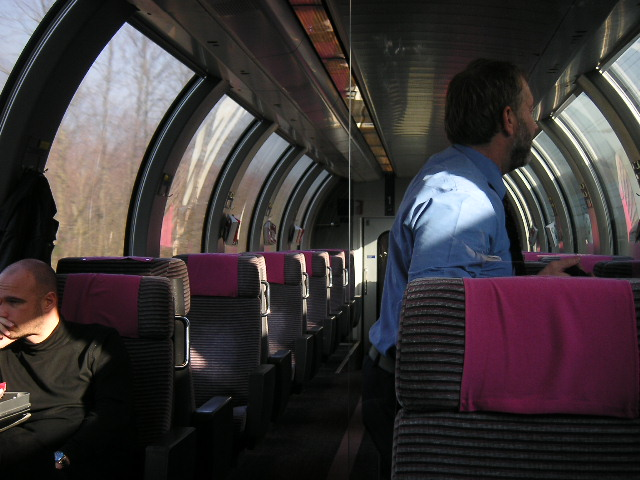
Interior of an SBB-CFF-FFS panorama car.

In May 1977, the Class 4010s were replaced with a locomotive-hauled train formation (consist).

On the first day of the new arrangement, 21 May, the Transalpin consisted of an ÖBB Class 1042 electric locomotive, five ÖBB Schlieren coaches, one DB WRümh restaurant car (ex-Rheingold) and six additional ÖBB Schlieren coaches.

From the following day, 22 May 1977, the train, now operating as Ex 462/463, was made up of 12 ÖBB Z1 (Eurofima) coaches, one WRümh and three DB RIC coaches.

On the ascending grades of the Arlberg railway, the eastbound locomotive-hauled train often received assistance from a pilot or banking locomotive.

In the 1990s, an SBB CFF FFS first-class panorama car was added to the train. In some of the annual schedules, the train received an additional SBB Am or Apm first class coach and the restaurant was an internationally equipped SBB WRm of the EW IV family. Between 1995 and 2009, this train used the SBB WRm with pantograph, for plugging electricity directly on the 15 KV AC low frequency catenaries, during longs stops for change locomotives in Buchs SG and Zürich HB (not electricity in others coaches during changing locomotives).

== See also ==
- History of rail transport in Austria
- History of rail transport in Switzerland
- List of named passenger trains of Europe
