= St. Anton am Arlberg railway station =

Railway station in Tyrol, Austria

St. Anton am Arlberg
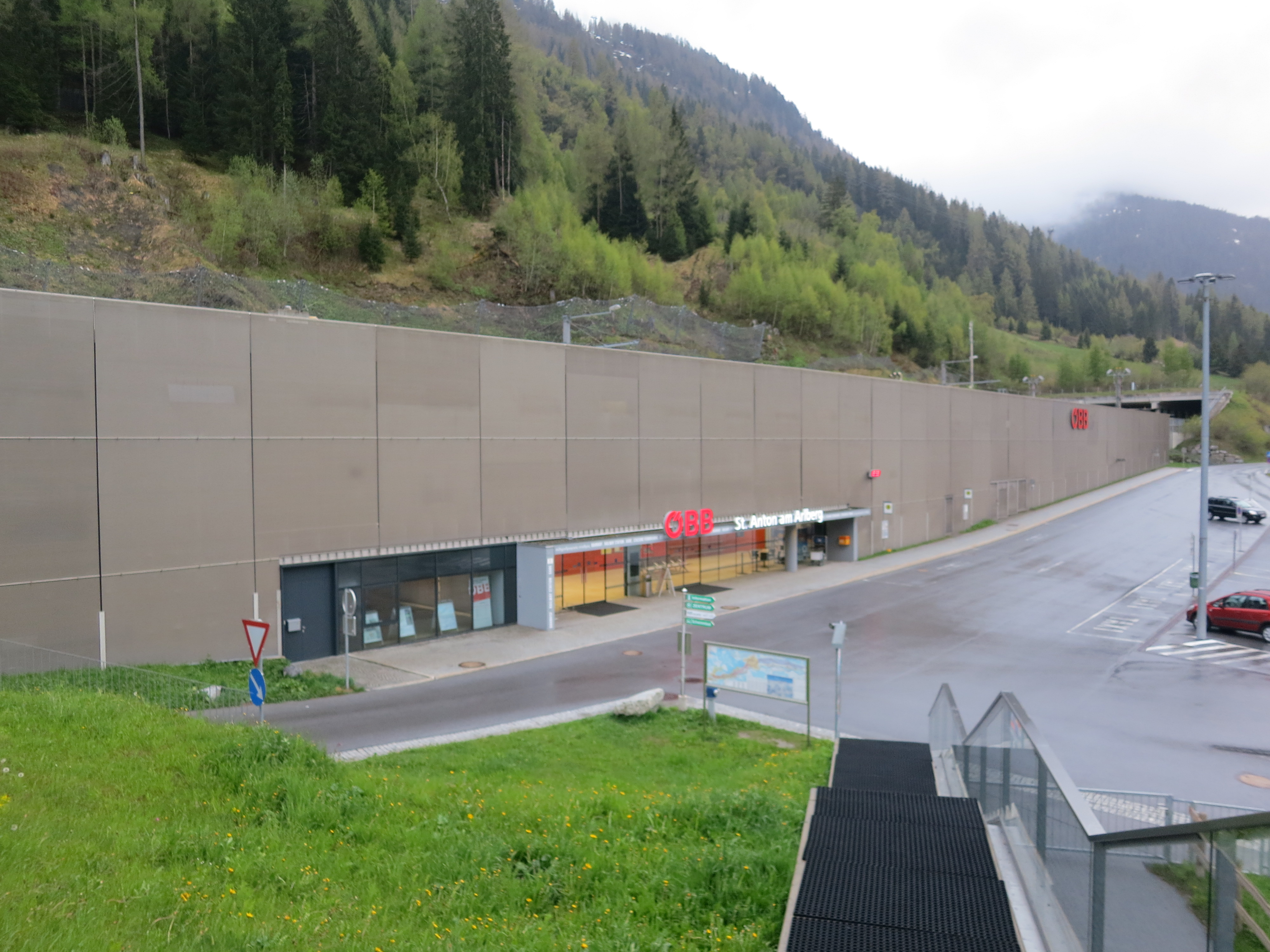
- Street entrance to the rebuilt station; the Arlberg Railway Tunnel portal is visible at the upper right

General information
- Location: Bahnhofstraße 6 St Anton am Arlberg; Austria
- Coordinates: 47°08′N 10°16′E
- Elevation: 1,309 m (4,295 ft)
- Line: Arlberg railway
- Distance: 99.4 kilometres (61.8 mi) from Innsbruck
- Train operators: ÖBB
Services
Preceding station	ÖBB	Following station
Bludenz towards Zürich HB	Railjet Express	Landeck-Zams towards Bratislava hl.st.
Bludenz towards Zürich HB	Railjet Express	Landeck-Zams towards Budapest Keleti
Bludenz towards Zürich HB	Railjet Express	Landeck-Zams towards Vienna Airport
Langen am Arlberg towards Bregenz	Railjet Express	Landeck-Zams towards Vienna Airport
Langen am Arlberg towards Bregenz	Railjet	Landeck-Zams towards Innsbruck Hbf
Bludenz towards Zürich HB	EuroCity (Transalpin)	Landeck-Zams towards Graz Hbf
Bludenz towards Zürich HB	EuroNight	Landeck-Zams towards Zagreb
Langen am Arlberg towards Bregenz	Nightjet	Landeck-Zams towards Wien Hbf
Langen am Arlberg towards Zürich HB	Nightjet	Landeck-Zams towards Graz Hbf
Preceding station	DB Fernverkehr	Following station
Langen am Arlberg towards Dortmund Hbf	ICE 62 Bodensee	Landeck-Zams towards Innsbruck Hbf
Preceding station		Following station
Bludenz toward Lindau-Insel	WESTbahn	Landeck-Zams toward Wien Westbahnhof
Location
- Location within Austria Location within Tyrol, Austria

St. Anton am Arlberg railway station (German: Bahnhof St. Anton am Arlberg) is a railway station in the village of St Anton am Arlberg in the Austrian state of Tyrol. It is located on the Arlberg railway between Innsbruck and Bludenz. It is located directly between the 10.648 km (6.616 mi) long Arlbergtunnel and the Wolfsgrubentunnel.

== Services ==
=== Rail services ===
St. Anton provides long-distance connections only, since regional traffic on the Arlberg mountain section was abandoned completely. In the winter season it is an important station for special ski trains from Denmark, Germany and the Netherlands whereas in the summer season it is even a scheduled stop of the Orient Express.

It is serviced by:

- InterCityExpress: Vienna–Innsbruck–Bregenz
- ÖBB-EuroCity: Vienna/Graz–Innsbruck–Feldkirch–Bregenz/Zürich (CH)
- EuroNight: Vienna/Graz–Innsbruck–Feldkirch–Bregenz/Zürich (CH)
- InterCity: Innsbruck–Dortmund/Münster (D)
- WESTbahn: Lindau-Insel–Wien Westbahnhof

=== Bus services ===
Two coach lines depart from St. Anton's station forecourt:

- Pettneu am Arlberg–Flirsch–Strengen–Pians–Landeck-Zams
- St. Christoph am Arlberg–Zürs–Lech am Arlberg

== See also ==
- Arlberg railway
- Arlbergtunnel
- Rail transport in Austria
