= Tyrol S-Bahn =

Railway network in Innsbruck, Austria

Coordinates: 47.2633°N 11.4010°E

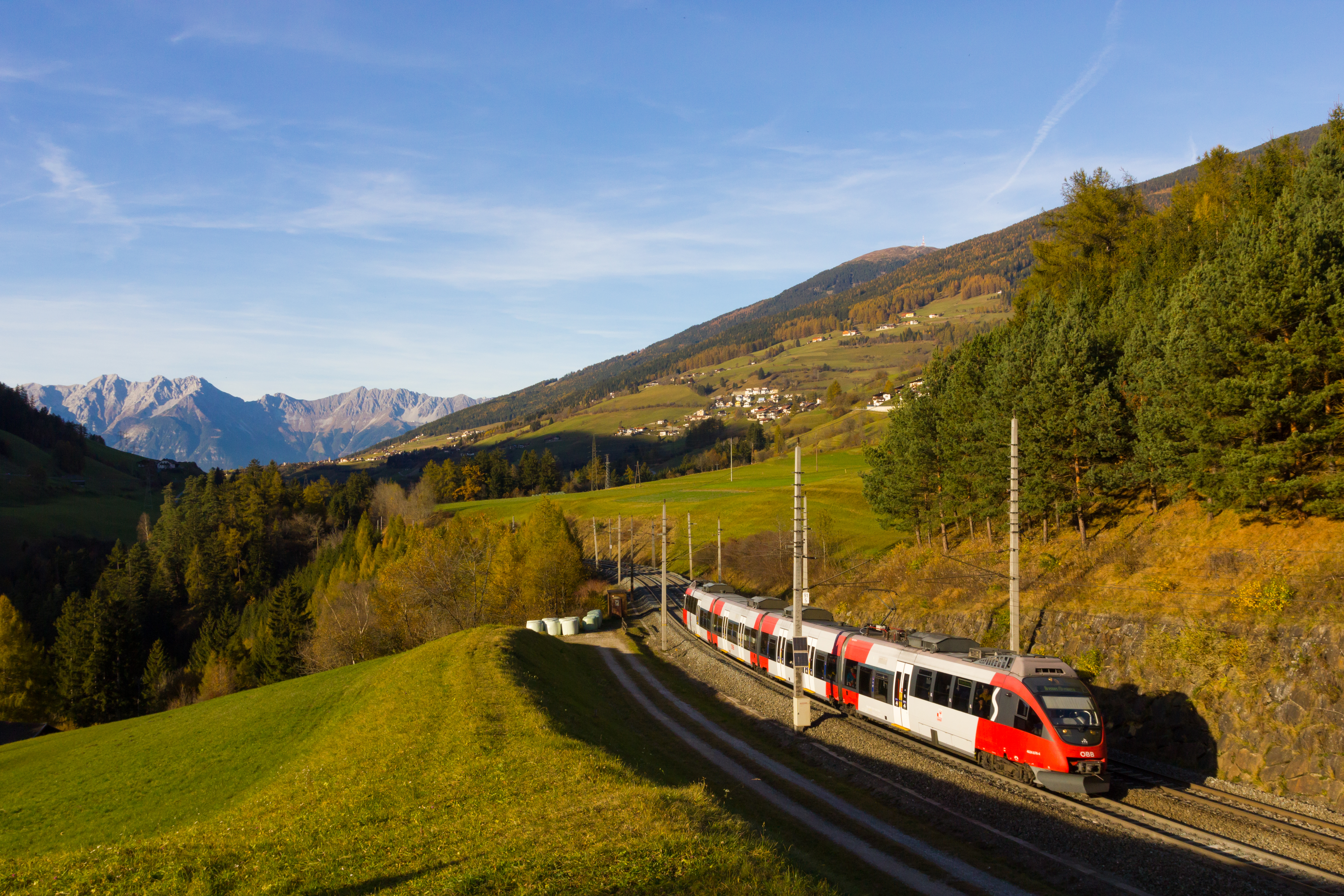
- An S-Bahn Talent-train near Matrei am Brenner.

Overview
- Area served: Tyrol, Austria Bavaria, Germany Trentino-South Tyrol, Italy
- Locale: Innsbruck, Austria
- Transit type: S-Bahn
- Number of lines: 8 S-Bahn, 3 REX
- Number of stations: 122
- Headquarters: Innsbruck
- Website: S-Bahn Tyrol (in English)

Operation
- Began operation: 13 December 2009
- Operator: Austrian Federal Railways (ÖBB)

Technical
- Track gauge: 1,435 mm (4 ft 8 1/2 in)
Tyrol S-Bahn
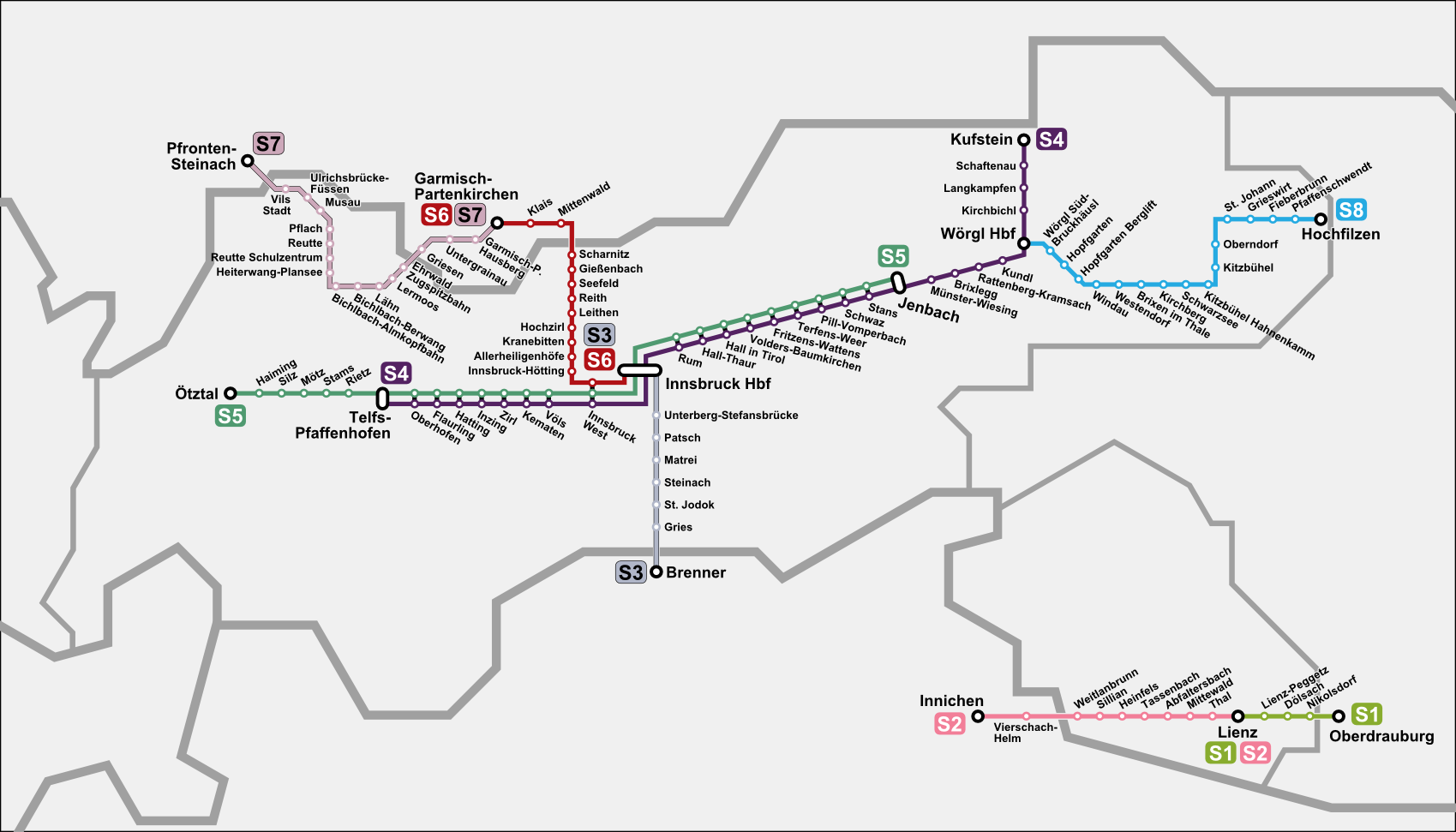
Tyrol S-Bahn S-Lines

The Tyrol S-Bahn, operated by ÖBB, provides regional rail services in metropolitan Innsbruck, Austria and its hinterlands in the state of Tyrol; and extended rail services into Italy and Germany.

== Current lines ==
There are eight S-Bahn lines, three Regional Express (REX-) lines, and the CJX 1 Line that are operated by ÖBB.

=== S-Bahn Lines ===
==== S1 and S2 ====
Line S1 runs from Lienz to Spittal-Millstättersee. Trains are available at Spittal-Millstättersee that continue to Villach or Schwarzach-St. Veit.

Line S2 runs from Fortezza/Franzensfeste in Italy to Lienz, connecting with S1 at Lienz and Brenner Lines running into Italy at Fortezza/Franzensfeste.

==== S3 ====
Line S3 runs from Brennero/Brenner in Italy to Innsbruck Hauptbahnhof, connecting with Brenner Lines at Brennero/Brenner; and S4, 5 and 6, REX lines 1 and 2, and CJX 1 at Innsbruck Hauptbahnhof.

==== S4 and S5 ====
Line S4 runs from Telfs-Pfaffenhofen to Kufstein, connecting with S3, 5 and 6, REX lines 1 and 2, and CJX 1 at Innsbruck Hauptbahnhof; and S8 and REX line 3 at Wörgl Hauptbahnhof. Trains are available at Kufstein that continue to Salzburg or Munich, in Germany.

Line S5 runs from Ötztal to Jenbach, connecting with S3, 4 and 6, REX lines 1 and 2, and CJX 1 at Innsbruck Hauptbahnhof; and S8 and REX line 3 at Wörgl Hauptbahnhof.

==== S6 and S7 ====
Line S6 runs from Garmisch-Partenkirchen in Germany to Innsbruck Hauptbahnhof; connecting with S7 at Garmisch-Partenkirchen; and S3, 4 and 5, REX lines 1 and 2, and CJX 1 at Innsbruck Hauptbahnhof. Trains are available at Garmisch-Partenkirchen that continue to Munich in Germany.

Line S7 runs from Pfronten-Steinach in Germany to Garmisch-Partenkirchen, connecting with S6 at Garmisch-Partenkirchen. Trains are available at Pfronten-Steinach that continue to Kempten in Germany.

==== S8 ====
Line S8 runs from Wörgl Hauptbahnhof to Hochfilzen; connecting with S4, REX line 2, and CJX 1 at Wörgl Hauptbahnhof.

=== Regional Express (REX) Lines ===
==== REX 1 ====
The REX 1 line runs from Landeck-Zams to Innsbruck Hauptbahnhof, connecting with S3, 4, 5, and 6, REX line 2, and CJX 1 at Innsbruck Hauptbahnhof. Trains are available at Landeck-Zams that continue to St Anton am Arlberg or Vorarlberg.

==== REX 2 ====
The REX 2 line runs from Innsbruck Hauptbahnhof to Kufstein; connecting with S3, 4, 5, and 6, REX line 1, and CJX 1 at Innsbruck Hauptbahnhof, and S8 and REX line 3 at Wörgl Hauptbahnhof.

==== REX 3 ====
The REX 3 line runs from Wörgl Hauptbahnhof to Saalfelden, connecting with S4 and 8, REX line 2 and CJX 1 at Wörgl Hauptbahnhof. Trains are available in Saalfelden that continue to Schwarzach-St. Veit.

==== CJX 1 ====
The CJX 1 line runs from Innsbruck Hauptbahnhof to Kufstein. It is practically the same as the REX 2 line, but stops at less stations. It connects with S3, 4, 5, and 6, and REX lines 1 and 2 at Innsbruck Hauptbahnhof, and S8 and REX line 3 at Wörgl Hauptbahnhof.

== History ==
The first S-Bahn line commenced operation on 9 December 2007 between 6am and 10pm at 30-minute intervals along the Inn valley lines (Lower Inn Valley and Arlberg railways) with stops at Hall in Tirol, Rum, Innsbruck central station, Innsbruck West station, Vols, Kematen in Tirol, Zirl, Inzing, Hatting, Flaurling, Oberhofen im Inntal and Telfs-Pfaffenhofen. On 14 December 2008 the second line opened with services on the Brenner railway. Although S-Bahn logos were installed from the beginning at the stations, it was first shown on official rail maps in December 2008.
