= Innsbruck Hauptbahnhof =

Railway station in Tyrol, Austria

Innsbruck Hbf.
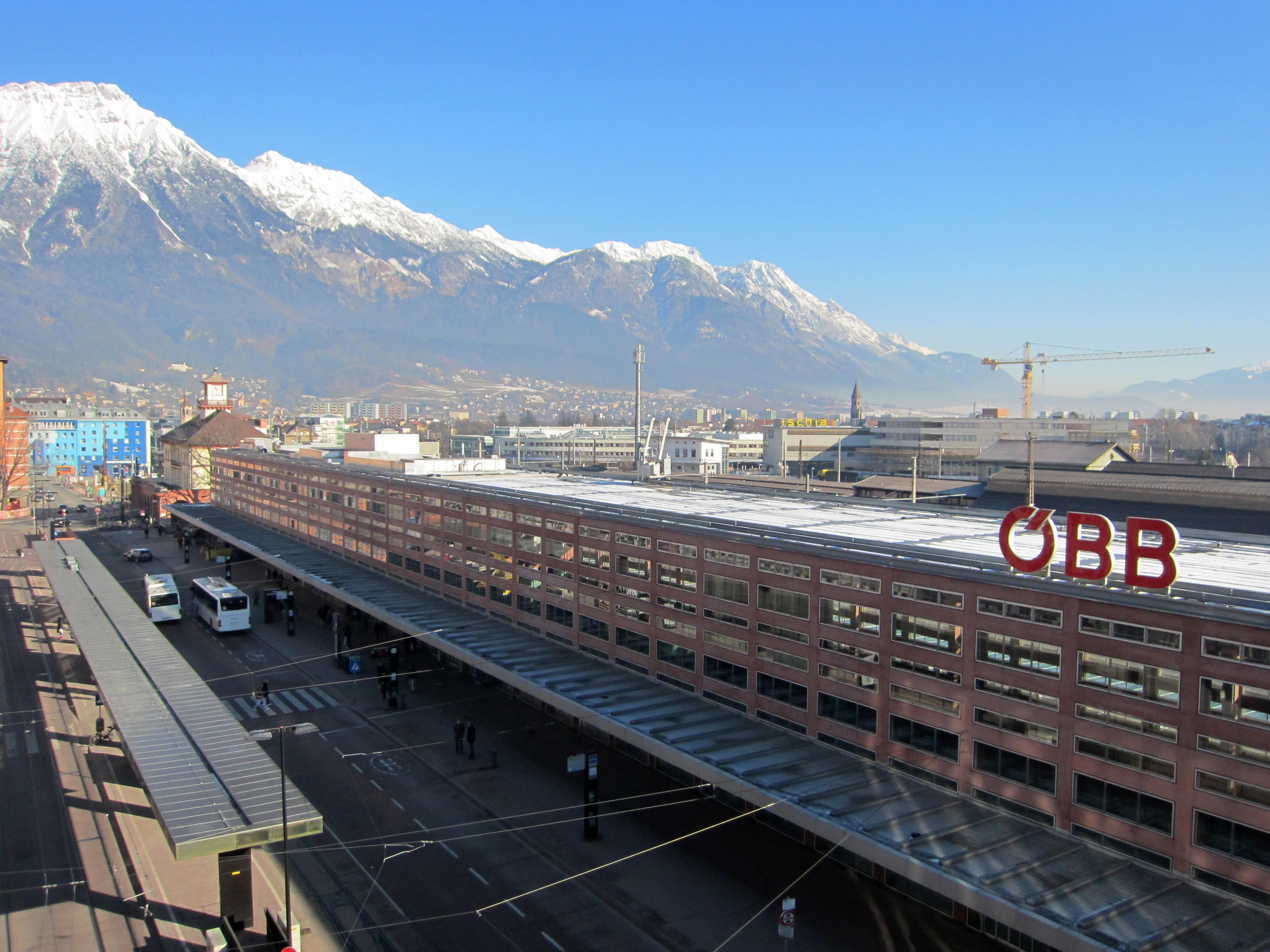
- View of the Südtiroler Platz and the station building from the south.

General information
- Location: Südtiroler Platz 7 A-6020 Innsbruck; Austria
- Coordinates: 47.2639°N 11.4008°E
- Owner: ÖBB
- Operator: ÖBB
- Lines: Arlberg Railway; Brenner Railway; Mittenwald Railway; Stubai Valley Railway; Lower Inn Valley Railway
- Platforms: 14
- Connections: S-Bahn: S1 S2 S3 S4 S5; Tram: STB 3; Bus: 4 D E F R S ST TS W

Construction
- Architect: Franz Czwerwenka (original building); Riegler Riewe (present building)

History
- Opened: 1853
- Rebuilt: 1927, 1954, 2001-2004

Passengers
- 38,500 (daily)
Services
Preceding station	ÖBB	Following station
Imst-Pitztal towards Frankfurt (Main) Hbf	Railjet Express	Jenbach towards Vienna Airport
Ötztal towards Zürich HB	Railjet Express	Wörgl Hbf towards Bratislava hl.st.
Ötztal towards Zürich HB	Railjet Express	Wörgl Hbf towards Budapest Keleti
Ötztal towards Zürich HB	Railjet Express	Wörgl Hbf towards Vienna Airport
Ötztal towards Zürich HB	EuroCity (Transalpin)	Jenbach towards Graz Hbf
Jenbach towards München Hbf	EuroCity	Brennero/Brenner towards Bologna Centrale
Jenbach towards München Hbf	EuroCity	Brennero/Brenner towards Rimini
Jenbach towards München Hbf	EuroCity	Brennero/Brenner towards Verona Porta Nuova
Jenbach towards München Hbf	EuroCity	Terminus
Terminus	InterCity	Jenbach towards Graz Hbf
Landeck-Zams towards Zürich HB	EuroNight	Schwarzach-St.Veit towards Zagreb
Landeck-Zams towards Zürich HB or Stuttgart Hbf	EuroNight	Salzburg Hbf towards Budapest Keleti
Landeck-Zams towards Zürich HB	EuroNight	Summerau towards Praha hl.n.
Terminus	Nightjet	Jenbach towards Amsterdam Centraal or Hamburg-Altona
Ötztal towards Bregenz	Nightjet	Salzburg Hbf towards Wien Hbf
Landeck-Zams towards Zürich HB	Nightjet	Schwarzach-St.Veit towards Graz Hbf
Landeck-Zams towards Zürich HB	Nightjet	Salzburg Hbf towards Wien Hbf
Terminus	CJX 1	Jenbach towards Kufstein
Preceding station	Tyrol S-Bahn	Following station
Innsbruck Westbf towards Landeck-Zams	REX 1	Terminus
Terminus	REX 2	Innsbruck Messe towards Kufstein
Terminus	S3	Unterberg Stefansbrücke towards Brenner
Innsbruck Westbf towards Telfs-Pfaffenhofen	S4	Innsbruck Messe towards Kufstein
Innsbruck Westbf towards Ötztal	S5	Innsbruck Messe towards Jenbach
Innsbruck Westbf towards Garmisch-Partenkirchen	S6	Terminus
Preceding station	DB Fernverkehr	Following station
Seefeld in Tirol towards Hamburg-Altona	ICE 24	Terminus
Landeck-Zams towards Dortmund Hbf	ICE 62 Bodensee	Terminus
Preceding station	Venice Simplon-Orient-Express	Following station
Paris-Est towards London Victoria	London–Paris–Rome	Genève-Cornavin towards Rome
Location
- Location within Tyrol, Austria Location within Austria Location within Europe

Innsbruck Hauptbahnhof (German, 'Innsbruck Main Station' or 'Innsbruck Central Station') is the main railway station in Innsbruck, the capital city of the Austrian federal state of Tyrol. Opened in 1853, the station is a major hub for western and central Austria. In 2019, it was the 8th-busiest station in the country, and the 2nd-busiest outside of Vienna after only Linz Hauptbahnhof, with 315 train movements and 38,500 passengers daily.

The station is owned and operated by ÖBB. It forms the junction of the Arlberg Railway to Bregenz, Brenner Railway to Italy, Mittenwald Railway to Germany's region of Ällgau, Stubaitalbahn and the main east–west artery Lower Inn Valley Railway.

== Location ==
Innsbruck Hauptbahnhof is located at Südtiroler Platz. It is at the southeastern side of the city centre and a 10-minute walk away.

== History ==
The planning of a railway line in the region of Tyrol began in 1850 under the Austrian Empire. Three years later, Emperor Franz Joseph I approved the route from Innsbruck to Wörgl across the Inn Valley. In 1854, the line is extended to the border city, Kufstein, close to the Kingdom of Bavaria. Franz Czwerwenka, head of the civil construction department, designed the railway station as one of the most beautiful station buildings within the Austrian Empire.

Innsbruck station opened along with the line to Kufstein. In 1867, the station then assumed greater importance upon the commissioning of the Brenner Railway (then part of the Southern Railway crossing the Alps at 1,371 m (4,498 ft) above sea into South Tyrol) and, in 1883, the Arlberg Railway (reaching the westernmost of modern-day Austria).Innsbruck West railway station was created for the Arlberg Railway. By the 1880s, due to the heavy train traffic over the Brenner Pass, the original station had become too small to accommodate passengers and freight; therefore, the station building and train shed were rebuilt on the same site.

=== Transfer to ÖBB ===
On 1 January 1924, ÖBB took over all railway lines of the Austrian Southern Railway. In 1927, the station was once again rebuilt to enhance its capacity. The departure hall was frescoed by Rudolf Stolz; the platforms were connected with a subway underneath and the train shed was replaced by platform roofs. At the same time, the Operations Directorate moved into the "Clock Tower Building" (so called due to a small clock tower at the top) in the station's north wing.

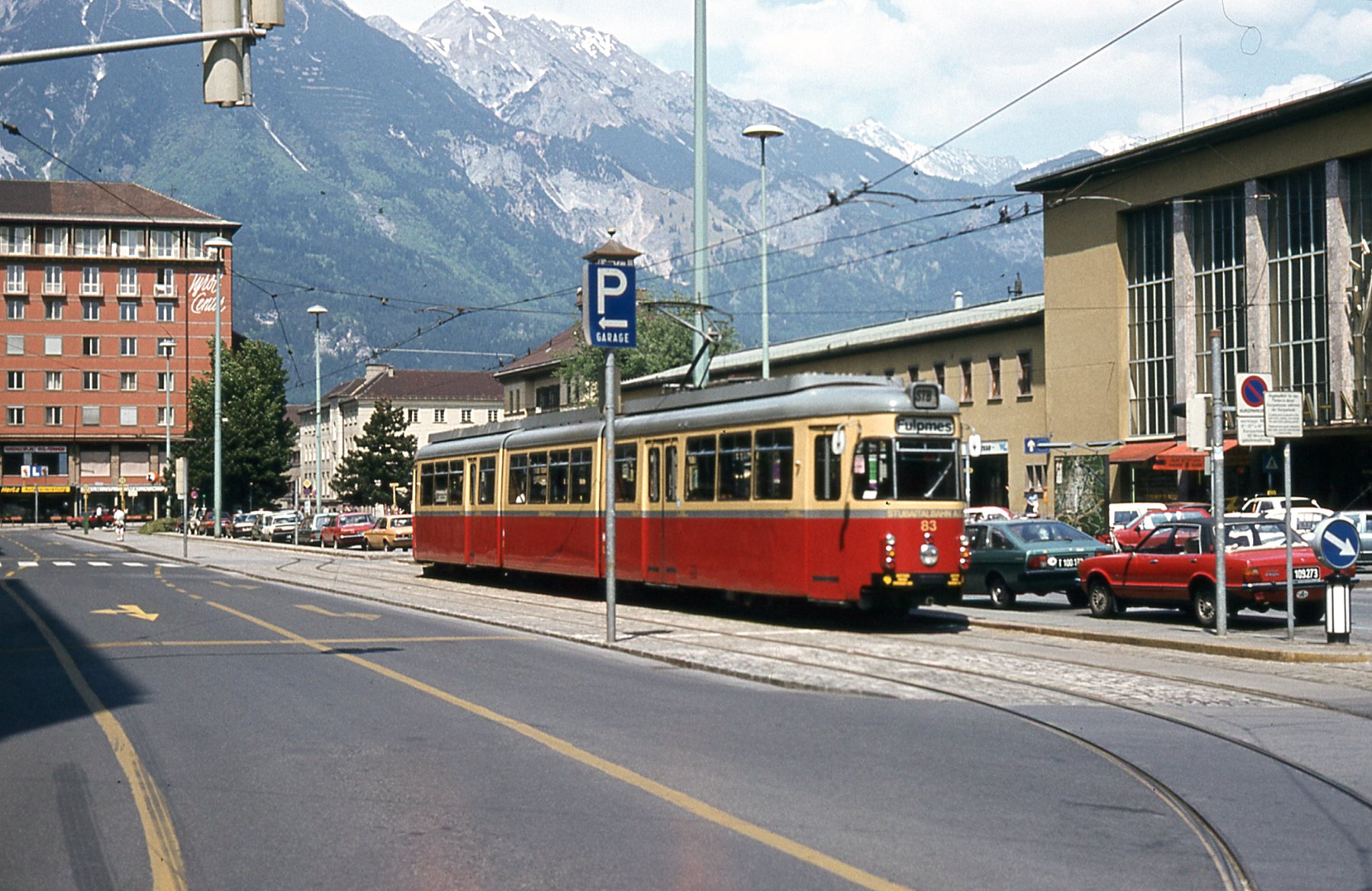
Stubai Valley tram, Südtiroler Platz, and post-war station building in the 1980s

By the end of World War II, the station was completely destroyed by Allied bombings. An ÖBB architect later combined various designs of other well-known architects to create a plain, functional replacement station building in the style of the 1950s. In 1954, the Austrian artist Max Weiler was awarded the contract for the design of a large departure hall. His design, however, has attracted controversy, as he chose a pair of murals on display to represent Innsbruck's heritage.

In 1997, the ÖBB launched Bahnhofsoffensive, a scheme to reconstruct existing railway stations within Austria. Innsbruck Hauptbhanhof received a new design by the architects of Riegler Riewe. The groundbreaking ceremony took place in 2001 and the new station was officially open on 19 May 2004. ÖBB renovated the 1920s clock tower in the north wing for housing a police station.

== Station building ==
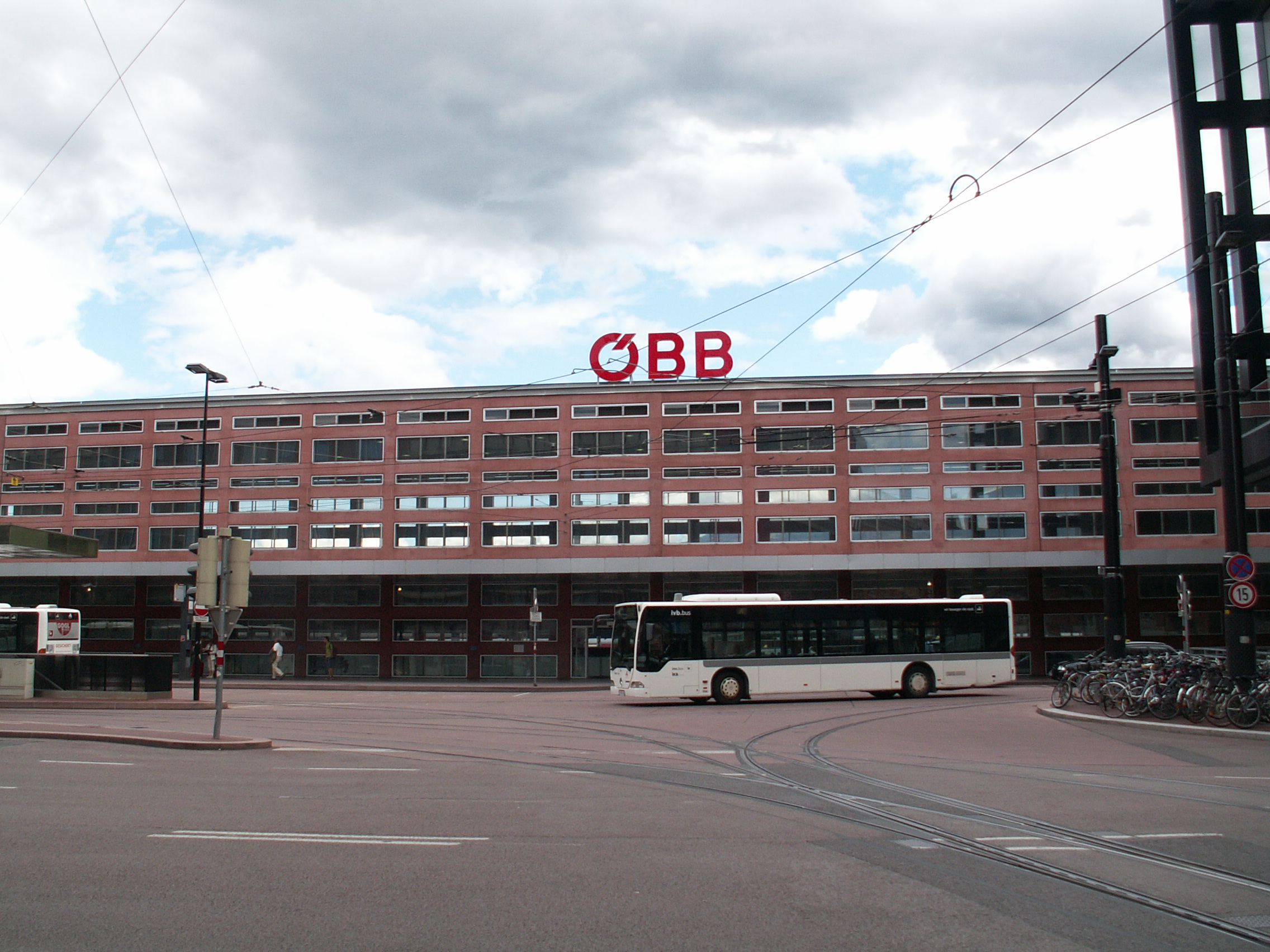
The present station building.

The central component of the present station building is the main hall, which extends through to the basement, with access to the platforms through two tunnels (north tunnel and south tunnel). There is also access from the main hall to the underground parking station (and then, via another pedestrian tunnel, to the Hotel Europa and escalators to the bus and tram terminals), and, via an additional pedestrian tunnel, to the bus station and local shops. On its northern side, the station building adjoins an office building.

The striking frescoes by Max Weiler, together with a few centimetres of underlying masonry, were removed from the 1950s station building in one piece and remounted in the new concourse.

Almost simultaneously with the construction of the new station building, a public transport hub was created in the station forecourt, which is paved with a red-colored asphalt (and nicknamed "Red Square"). The new hub serves the Innsbruck tramway network, regional and urban bus lines, and the narrow gauge Stubai Valley Railway. At the time it was created, a rail junction was built at the southern end of the square for a proposed new tram route towards the south, but construction of the new route itself was deferred.

== Other facilities ==
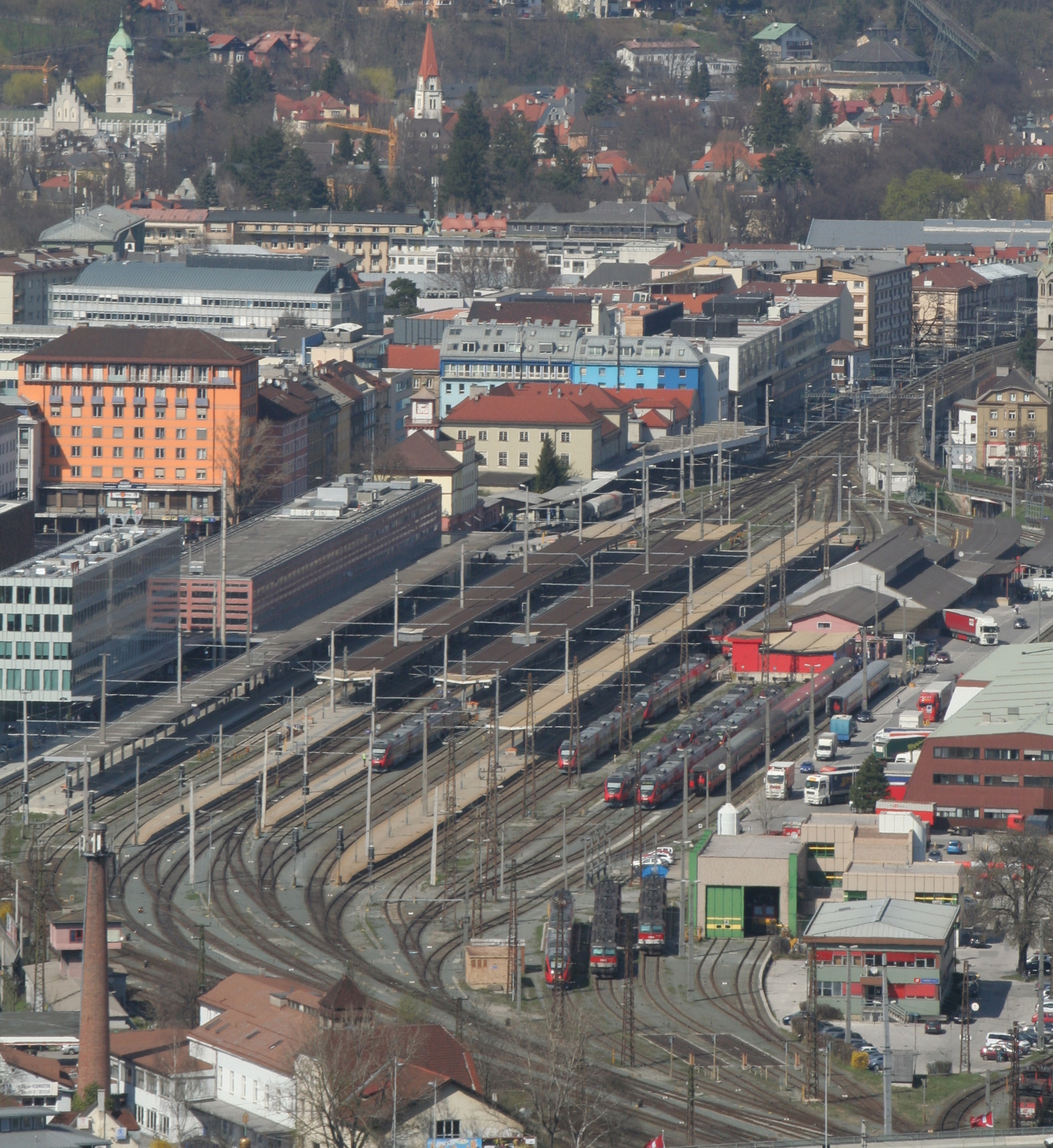
Overview from Bergisel.

The station has eight through tracks. Of these, platform 1 is accessible at ground level as "home platform", and platform 8 is accessible from the East (only) for loading cars onto motorail trains.

Additionally, there are four bay platforms (platforms 21–22, 31 and 41), for regional passenger traffic via the Mittenwald railway, the Arlberg railway and the Brenner railway.

The Hauptbahnhof complex includes the Frachtenbahnhof Innsbruck, which, amongst other facilities, lost much of its importance when the Innsbruck goods train bypass (Inntaltunnel) was completed in 1994. It now stands to be partially transformed in the course of urban development into a residential area.

The shunting yard of the Innsbruck railway junction is located at Hall in Tirol.

== Services ==
=== Significance ===
The station is important for commuter traffic to and from the Tyrolean provincial capital, and in providing a hub function for east–west traffic ((Budapest) – Vienna – Salzburg – Wörgl – Innsbruck (Zürich) / Bregenz) and north–south traffic (Munich – Wörgl – Innsbruck – Bolzano – Verona – (Milan / Venice / Rome )).

Since December 2007, the station has also been the focal point of Tyrol S-Bahn lines S1, S2 and S3, and a terminus of lines S4 and S5.

The railway line between Baumkirchen (about 15 km (9.3 mi) east of Innsbruck Hauptbahnhof) and Wörgl Hauptbahnhof (known as the Lower Inn Valley railway) is one of the busiest railway lines in Austria (up to 430 trains a day) and is therefore currently being rebuilt as a four track line, as part of the TEN Berlin–Palermo axis. In Wörgl Hauptbahnhof, the railway line divides into a northern branch via Kufstein to Salzburg and Munich, and an eastern branch via Zell am See to Salzburg, Graz and Klagenfurt (Gisela Railway).

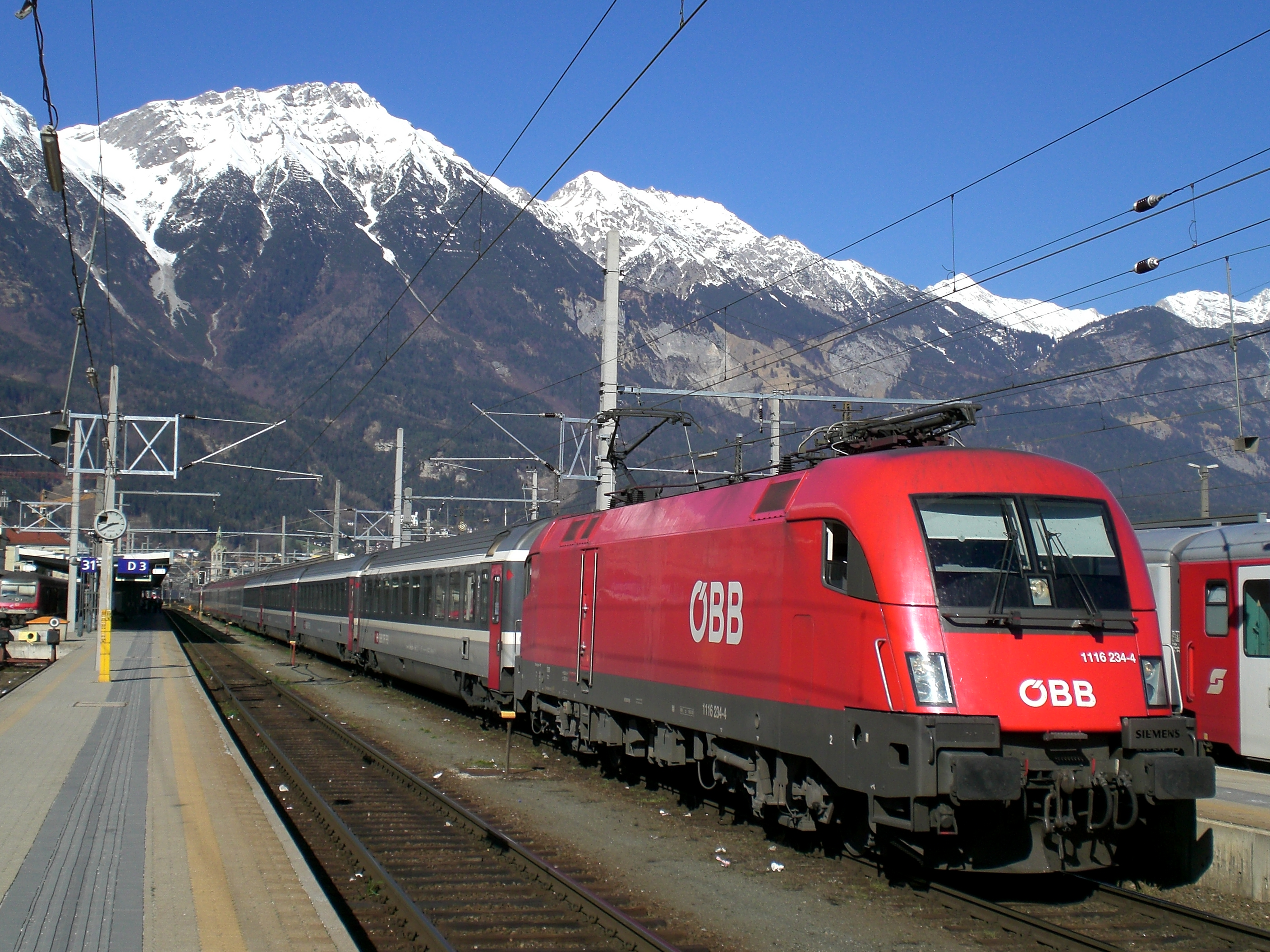
ÖBB EuroCity leaving Innsbruck Hauptbahnhof for Basel, Switzerland

=== Rail services ===
The following services call at this station (incomplete):

=== Domestic ===
- Intercity train (ÖBB Railjet 'RJ' / Intercity) Innsbruck-Salzburg: Innsbruck - Jenbach - Wörgl - Kufstein - Salzburg
- Intercity train (ÖBB Railjet 'RJ' / Intercity) Zürich-Vienna: Zürich - Feldkirch - St. Anton am Arlberg - Landeck-Zams - Imst-Pitztal - Ötztal - Innsbruck - Jenbach - Wörgl - Kufstein - Salzburg - Linz - St. Pölten - Vienna
- Intercity train (ÖBB Railjet 'RJ' / Intercity) Innsbruck-Bregenz: Innsbruck - Ötztal - Imst-Pitztal - Landeck-Zams - St. Anton am Arlberg - Feldkirch - Bregenz
- Metre-gauge train (Stubaitalbahn) Innsbruck-Fulpmes: Innsbruck - Fulpmes

=== Domestic and Germany/South Tyrol ===
(D for Germany, I for Italy)

- Intercity train (ÖBB Eurocity) Munich-Innsbruck: Munich (D) - Rosenheim (D) - Kufstein - Wörgl - Jenbach - Innsbruck
- Intercity train (DB Intercity Express 'ICE') Munich-Innsbruck: Munich (D) - Garmish-Partenkirchen (D) - Mittenwald (D) - Seefeld-in-Tirol - Innsbruck
- Regional train (ÖBB Regional-Express 'REX') Innsbruck-Mittenwald: Innsbruck - Seefeld-in-Tirol - Mittenwald (D)
- Regional train (Südtirol Bahn Regional-Express 'REX') Innsbruck-Bozen: Innsbruck - Matrei-am-Brenner - Brenner/Brennero (I) - Franzensfeste/Fortezza (I) - Bozen/Bolzano (I)

=== Cross-border (Night train) ===
(CH for Switzerland, D for Germany, H for Hungary, F for France, I for Italy, PL for Poland, BR for Belarus, R for Russia, CZ for Czech Republic, SLO for Slovenia, HR for Croatia, SEB for Serbia)

On 11 December, ÖBB will take over all night trains of Deutsch Bahn and rebrand EuroNight services as "Nightjet".

- Night train (ÖBB EuroNight) Budapest-Zürich: Budapest (H) - Györ (H) - Vienna - St Pölten - Linz - Salzburg - Innsbruck - Feldkirch - Buchs SG (CH) - Sargans (CH) - Zürich (CH)
- Night train (DB CityNightLine) Munich-Milan/Rome: Munich (D) - Rosenheim (D) - Kufstein - Wörgl - Jenbach - Innsbruck - Bozen/Bolzano (I) - Verona^ (I) - Perschiera del Garda (I) - Brescia (I) - Milan (I)
- Night train (ÖBB EuroNight) Feldkirch-Zagreb: Feldkirch - St. Anton am Arlberg - Landeck-Zams - Innsbruck - Jenbach - Wörgl - Bad Hofgastein - Bad Gastein - Villach - Jesenice (SLO) - Ljubljana (SLO) - Zagreb (HR)

^ Train connects at Verona with ÖBB EuroNight Vienna-Rome

From 11 December, a new service Düsseldorf-Innsbruck will be operated by ÖBB:

- Night train (ÖBB Nightjet) Hamburg/Düsseldorf-Innsbruck/Vienna: Düsseldorf (D) - Frankfurt (D) - Nuremberg/Nürnberg (D) (train connects with Hamburg-Nürnberg-Wien) - Munich/München (D) - Innsbruck

=== Cross-border ===
- Intercity train (ÖBB EuroCity) Munich-Verona/Venice: Munich (D) - Rosenheim (D) - Kufstein - Wörgl - Jenbach - Innsbruck - Brenner/Brennero (I) - Franzensfeste/Fortezza (I) - Brixen/Bressanone (I) - Bozen/Bolzano (I) - Trient/Trento (I) - Rofreit/Rovereto (I) - Verona (I) - (Padova (I)) - (Venice (I))
- Intercity train (ÖBB EuroCity) Munich-Verona/Bologna: Munich (D) - Rosenheim (D) - Kufstein - Wörgl - Jenbach - Innsbruck - Brenner/Brennero (I) - Franzensfeste/Fortezza (I) - Brixen/Bressanone (I) - Bozen/Bolzano (I) - Trient/Trento (I) - Rofreit/Rovereto (I) - Verona (I) - (Bologna (I))
- Intercity Train (RZD EuroNight) Moscow-Nice: Moscow (Belorusskaja) (R) - Wjasma (R) - Smolensk (R) - Orscha Central (ВR) - Minsk (BR) - Brest Central (BR) - Terespol (PL) - Warsaw West (Wschodnia) (PL) - Warsaw Central (Centralna) (PL)- Katowice (PL) - Zebrzydowice (PL) - Bohumin (CZ) - Breclav (CZ) - Vienna/Wien - Linz-Donau - Innsbruck - Bozen/Bolzano (I) - Verona (I) - Milan (I) - Genova/Genoa (I) - San Remo (I) - Ventimiglia (I) - Menton (F) - Monaco Monte-Carlo (MN) - Nice (F)
- Tourist train (Venice-Simplon Orient Express) Venice-London: Venice (I) or Rome (I) - Verona (I) - Innsbruck - Munich (D) - Paris (F) - London (GB)

=== Tyrol S-Bahn ===
- Line 1: Landeck-Zams - Imst-Pitztal - Ötztal - Telfs - Innsbruck - Hall-in-Tirol - Jenbach - Wörgl - Kufstein - (Rosenheim)
- Line 2: Landeck-Zams - Imst-Pitztal - Ötztal - Telfs - Innsbruck - Hall-in-Tirol - Jenbach
- Line 3: Hall-in-Tirol - Innsbruck - Steinach-am-Brenner
- Line 4: Brenner - Gries-am-Brenner - Steinach-am-Brenner - Matrei-am-Brenner - Innsbruck - (Völs)
- Line 5: Innsbruck - Seefeld-in-Tirol
- Line 6: Scharnitz - Kufstein

=== Bus services ===
Innsbruck Hauptbahnhof is the hub of IVB, the bus and tram operator of Innsbruck. Most of the lines have a stop at Hauptbahnhof. With the bus line F, the station is connected to Innsbruck Airport. From the station forecourt there are departing not only city lines but also regional lines to different destinations in all directions. In the past (before 2007), the station was served by the Innsbruck trolleybus system, and reinstatement of trolleybus service is planned for 2029 on one route serving the station (R).

== See also ==
- Rail transport in Austria
