= Brenner railway station =

Railway station in Italy

Brennero Brenner
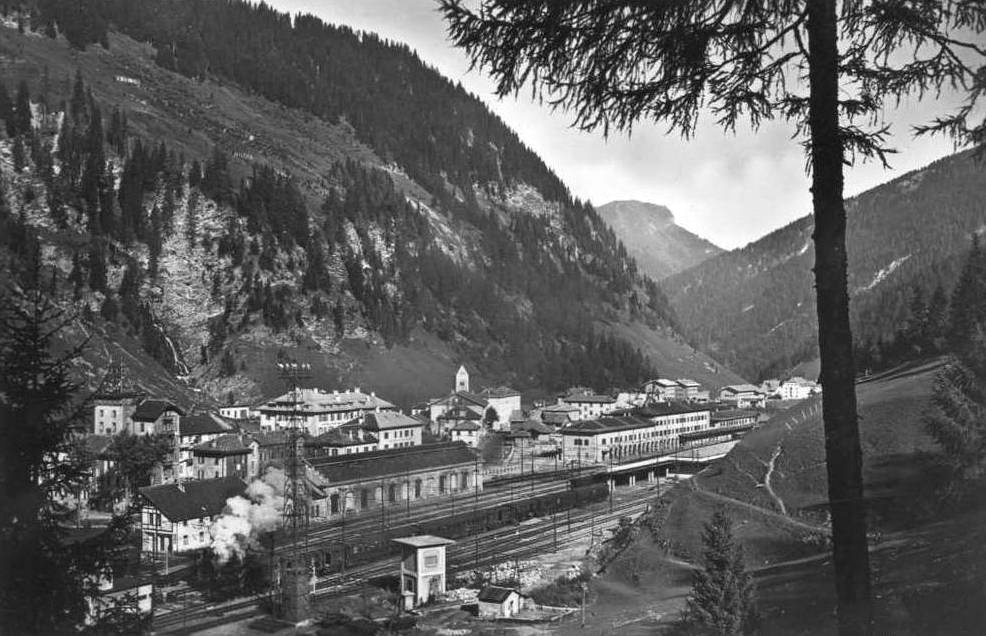
- Old view of Brenner station: tickets; pedestrian underpass; cafeteria; restaurant; newsstand; WC; public transportation

General information
- Location: Karl von Etzel-Strasse, 7; 39041 Brenner; Brenner (BZ), Trentino-Alto Adige/Südtirol; Italy
- Coordinates: 47°00′07″N 11°30′18″E
- Operator: Rete Ferroviaria Italiana
- Line: Verona–Innsbruck
- Distance: 240.083 km (149.181 mi) from Verona Porta Vescovo; 111.663 km (69.384 mi) from Kufstein
- Platforms: 5 through platforms 4 bay platforms
- Train operators: Trenitalia; ÖBB-DB
- Connections: Urban buses

History
- Opened: 24 August 1867; 158 years ago
Location
- Location within Trentino-Alto Adige/Südtirol Location within Northern Italy Location within Italy

Brenner railway station (German: Bahnhof Brenner; Italian: Stazione di Brennero) is the border station of Italy and Austria. It serves the town and comune of Brenner in the autonomous province of South Tyrol, northeastern Italy.

The station, situated at 1,371 m above sea, was opened in 1867 by the Austrian Empire's Südbahn as a mountain pass stop along the Brenner Railway. In 1919, Brenner station came 300 m (980 ft) south of the border due to the annexation of County of Tyrol's territory by Italy from Treaty of Saint Germain-en-Laye (1919).

The station is currently managed by Rete Ferroviaria Italiana (RFI). Italian train services to and from this station are operated by Trenitalia. Austrian train services are operated by ÖBB.

== Location ==
The station is situated at Karl-von-Etzel-Strasse in the centre of town.

== History ==
=== County of Tyrol ===
Construction of the Brenner Railway between Verona (Bern-im-Wälsch) to Innsbruck began in 1851 under the Austrian Empire's Südbahn.

On 25 July 1867, the section between Bozen and Brenner entered operation; the first train to leave for Bozen left Brenner at 8.05 am. Brenner station was officially opened on 24 August 1867, together with the remaining final section to Innsbruck.

Some houses in Brenner had been destroyed to make room for a new area, 600 m (2,000 ft) long, for the station building and other rail infrastructure. The arrival of railway opened a new era for the village: it confirmed Brenner Pass, which has already been a major trans-Alpine crossing from the ancient Roman times, as the principal mountain pass for travellers and merchants. Moreover, the railway enabled more efficient movement of troops for the Austrian Empire to secure its southern regions of modern-day Veneto and Lombardy.

=== Transfer to Italy ===
On 26 April 1915, the Treaty of London promised Italy the territory south of the Brenner Pass (now known as South Tyrol), if the country switched its side to support the Entente powers against the Central Powers led by the German and Austro-Hungarian empires.

On 10 November 1918, following the German Empire's call for an armistice, Italian troops moved up from Veneto and arrived at Brenner. The Treaty of Saint-Germain-en-Laye was signed with Austria on 10 September 1919. Under that treaty, the new border of Italy and Austria (Republic of German-Austria) moved to Brenner.

=== Schengen passport-free zone ===
In 1992, Austria signed the Schengen Agreement and subsequently became a member nation of the European Union in 1995. Border and custom control posts at Brenner station have been removed.

== Features ==
The passenger building is a modest, well-maintained three-storey structure. At ground level, it houses the ticket office, a waiting room and a station cafe. There are offices upstairs for both rail operators, Trenitalia and ÖBB,

The station yard has a total of 12 through tracks: five of them are equipped with platforms and four terminating tracks with bay platforms. All of the platforms are connected by a pedestrian underpass.

Another seven through tracks, which are not equipped with platforms, are used for overtaking and exchange of locomotives. All single system electric locomotives must be changed here at the border, since Austria and Italy use different electrical networks (15 kV AC at 16 2/3 Hz in Austria, 3000 V DC in Italy). However, the Südtirol Bahn now operate on multi-system locomotives on their Bozen/Bolzano-Innsbruck through service.

== Passenger and train movements ==
There is considerable transit traffic of both passengers and goods through the station.

Austria/South Tyrol

- Regional train (Südtirol Bahn Regio-Express) Bozen-Innsbruck: Innsbruck - Brennero/Brenner - Fortezza/Franzensfeste - Bressanone/Brixen - Bolzano/Bozen
- Tyrol S-Bahn Line 4: Brenner - Gries-am-Brenner - Steinach-am-Brenner - Matrei-am-Brenner - Innsbruck
- Regional train (Südtirol Bahn Regio) Brenner-Meran: Brennero/Brenner - Vipiteno/Sterzing - Fortezza/Franzensfeste - Bressanone/Brixen - Chiusa/Klausen - Bolzano/Bozen - Terlano/Terlan - Merano/Meran

Italy

- Regional train (Trenitalia Regional Express) Brennero/Brenner-Bologna: Brennero/Brenner - Fortezza/Franzensfeste - Bressanone/Brixen - Chuisa/Klausen - Bolzano/Bozen - Ora/Auer - Trento/Trient - Rovereto/Rofreit - Verona - Isola della Scala - Nogara - Bologna

Cross-border

- Intercity train (ÖBB EuroCity) Munich-Verona/Venice: Munich - Kufstein - Jenbach - Innsbruck - Bolzano/Bozen - Trento/Trient - Rovereto/Rofreit - Verona - (Padua) - (Venice)
- Intercity train (ÖBB EuroCity) Munich-Verona/Bologna: Munich - Kufstein - Jenbach - Innsbruck - Bolzano/Bozen - Trento/Trient - Rovereto/Rofreit - Verona - (Bologna)

== Future ==
In addition to passenger traffic, Brenner has seen an increasing volume of freight traffic over the past decades. The dual-track Brenner Railway was already running at full capacity as of the late 2000s; therefore, transport of freight by road has risen and consequently caused traffic congestion and air pollution, as Brenner Pass is the region's only major thoroughfare between Austria and Italy.

The Brenner Base Tunnel, scheduled to be completed in 2032, would divert all freight rail traffic between Fortezza/Franzensfeste and Innsbruck via a tunnel underneath Brenner. Local traffic between Fortezza, Brenner and Innsbruck would continue with additional capacity being released on this railway section. The majority of freight traffic, as well as some passenger services, would make use of this tunnel. Journey time between Bozen/Bolzano and Innsbruck would be reduced from 2 hours to 50–55 minutes.

Example of reduction of journey times (if passenger services are transferred to the Base Tunnel):

- Bozen/Bolzano to Innsbruck - 2 hours currently; 50 minutes via Brenner Base Tunnel
- Verona to Munich - 5 hours 20 minutes currently; 4 hours 10 minutes via Brenner Base Tunnel omitting Brenner station only

== Gallery ==
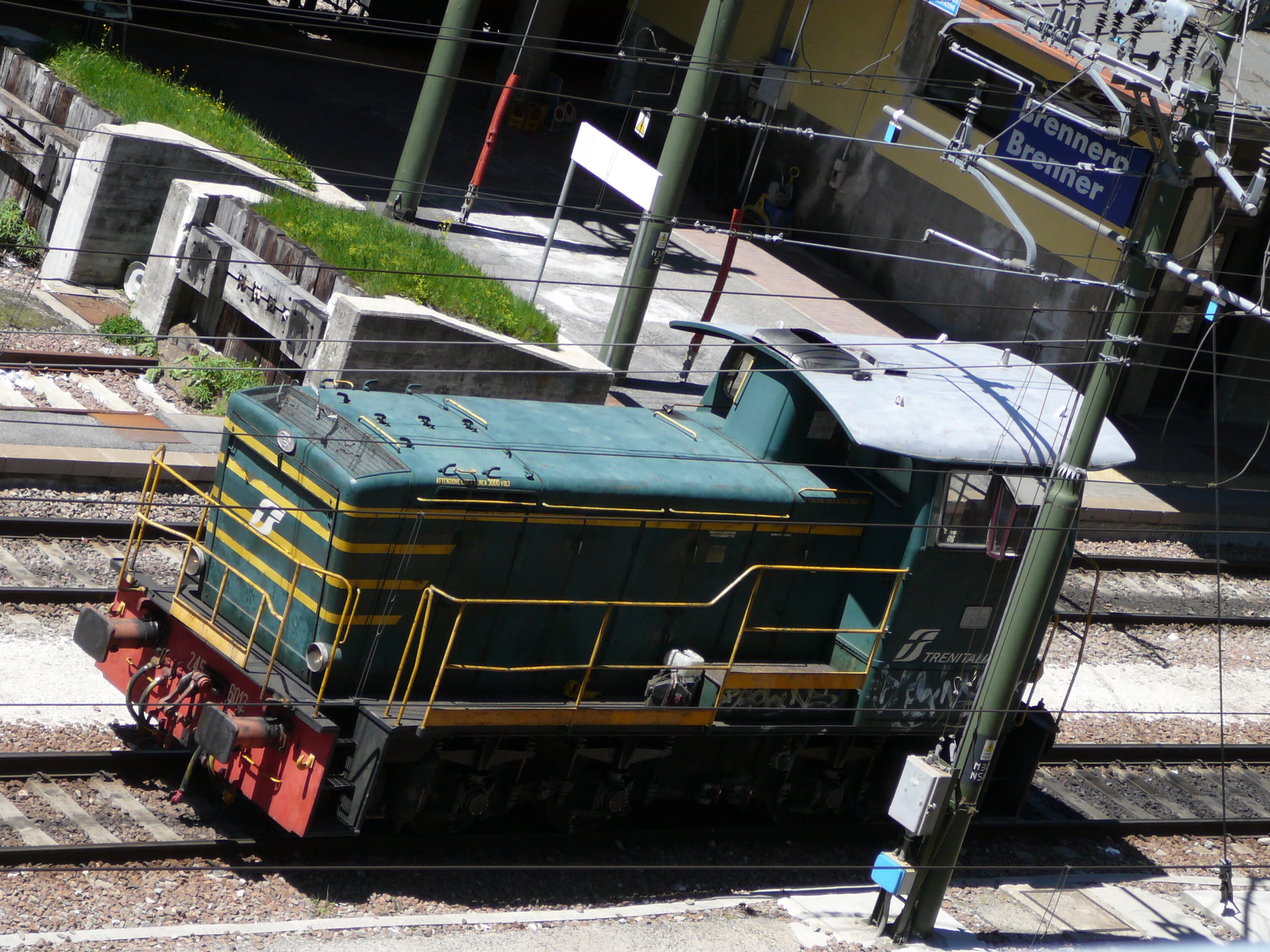
FS class 245 locomotive at the station.

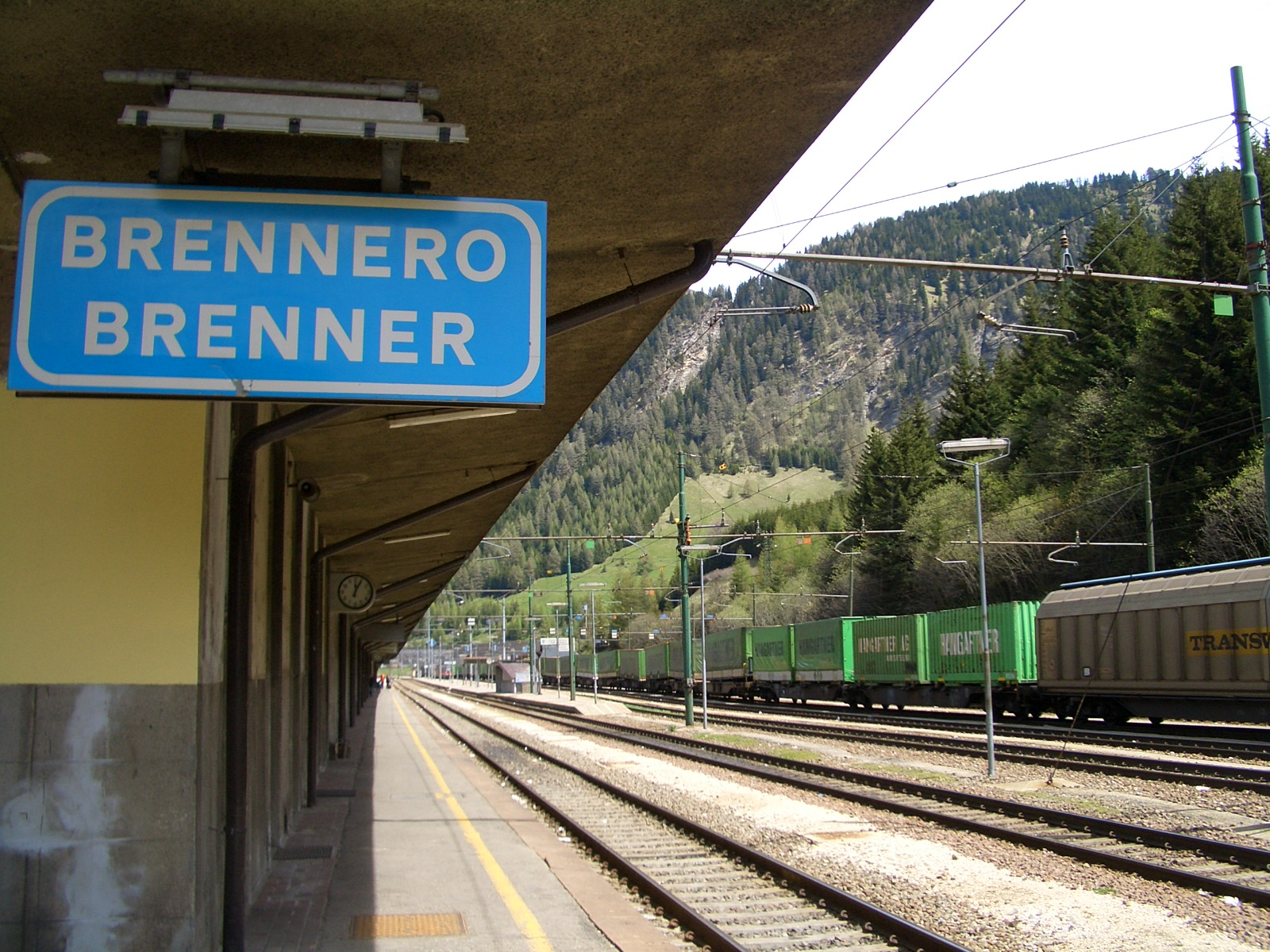
Old station sign.

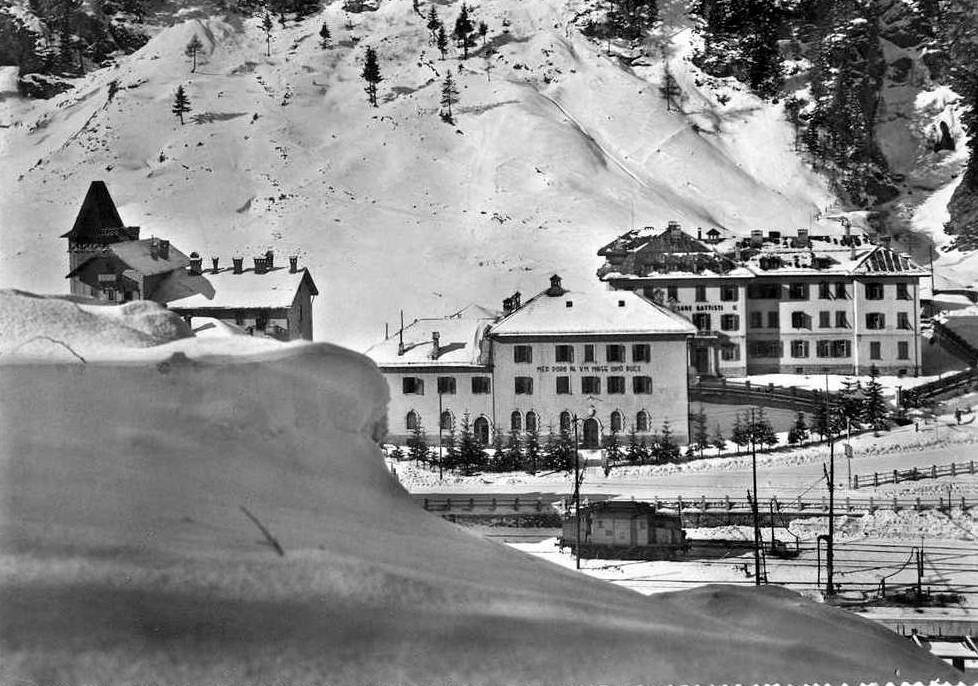
View of the station.

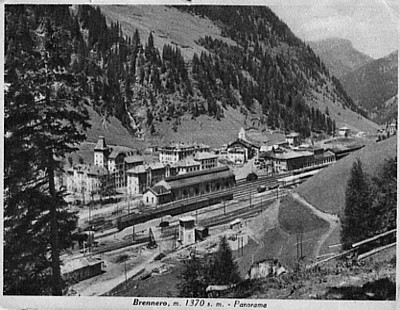
Brenner in 1939.

== See also ==
- History of rail transport in Italy
- Rail transport in Italy
- Railway stations in Italy
