= Pians =

Municipality in Tyrol, Austria

- Municipality
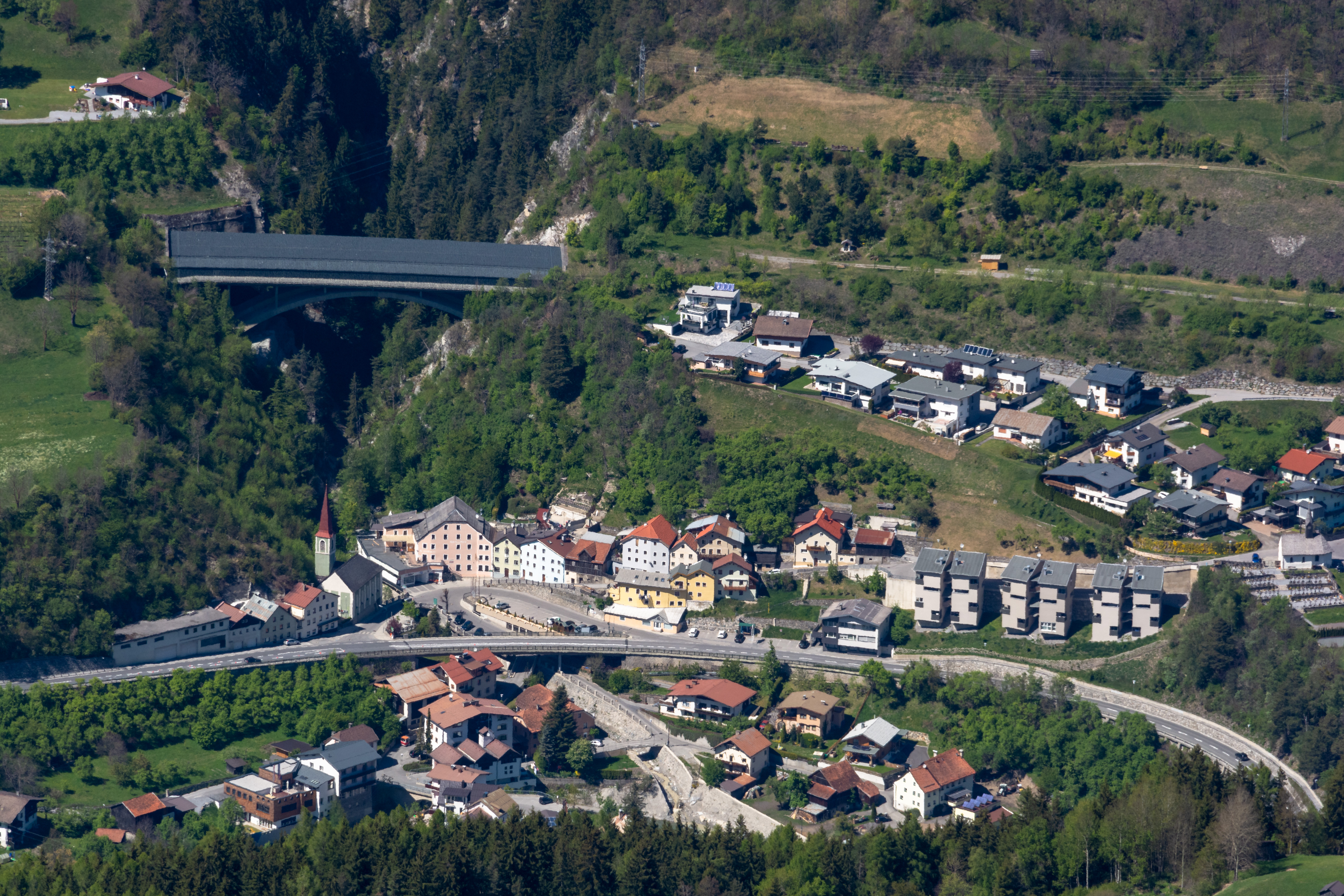
- View of Pians

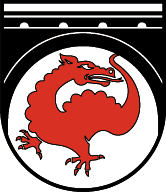
- Coat of arms

- Location within Austria
- Coordinates: 47°08′04″N 10°30′38″E
- Country: Austria
- State: Tyrol
- District: Landeck

Government
  - Mayor: Peter Rauchegger

Area
  - Total: 2.9 km^{2} (1.1 sq mi)
- Elevation: 856 m (2,808 ft)

Population (2018-01-01)
  - Total: 813
  - Density: 280/km^{2} (730/sq mi)
- Time zone: UTC+1 (CET)
  - Summer (DST): UTC+2 (CEST)
- Postal code: 6551
- Area code: 05442
- Vehicle registration: LA
- Website: www.pians.tirol.gv.at

Pians is a municipality in the district of Landeck in the Austrian state of Tyrol located 4.3 km west of the city of Landeck. The main source of income is tourism.
