= Hans Haid =

Austrian folklorist (1938–2019)

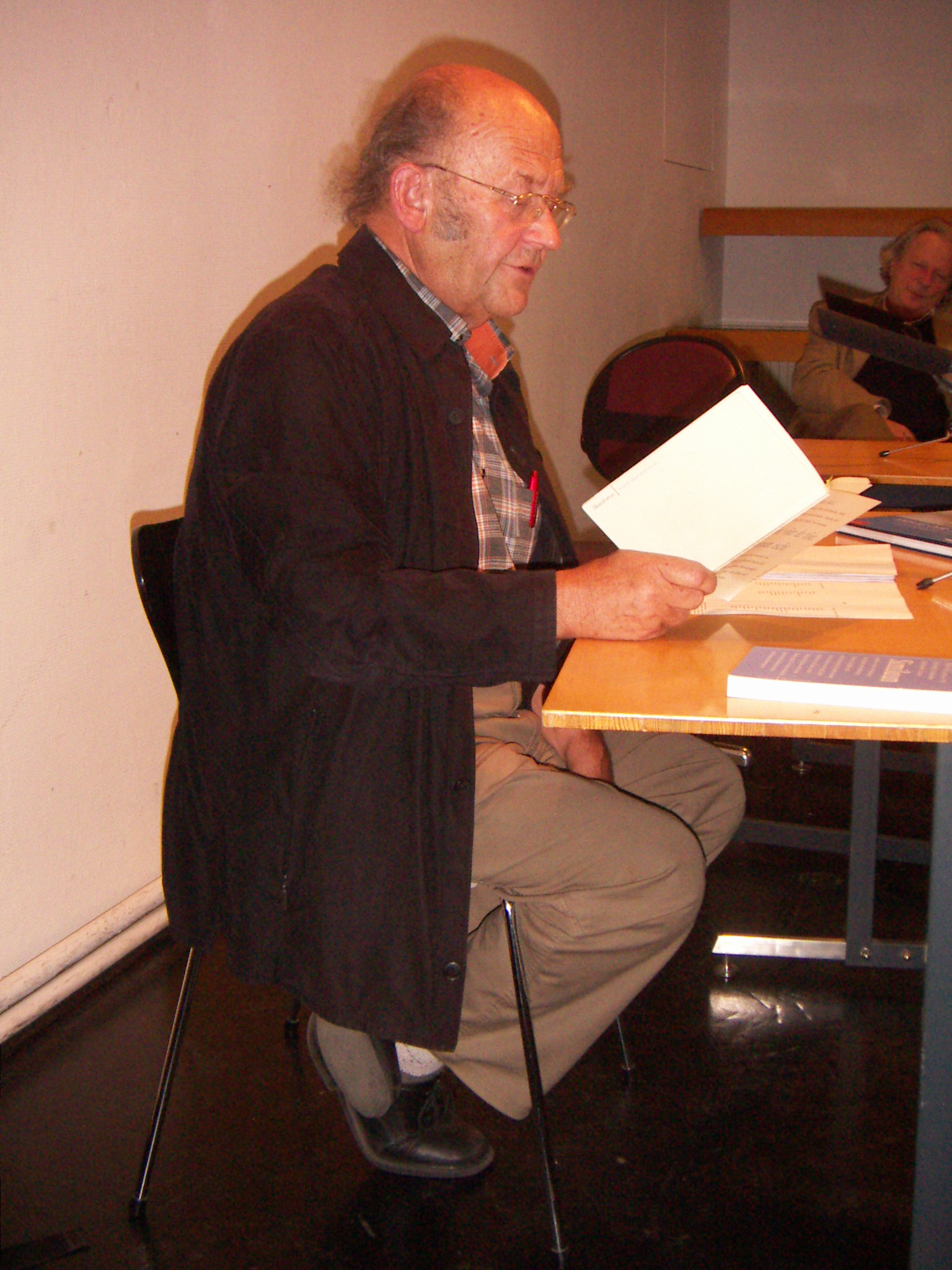
Alte Schmiede in Vienna: Reading by Hans Haid (2008)

Hans Haid (26 February 1938 – 5 February 2019) was an Austrian folklorist, mountain farmer and dialect poet.

== Life ==
Born in Längenfeld, Ötztal, Haid was a clerk, took the external Matura in 1963 and then studied folklore and history of art at the University of Vienna, which he completed in 1974 with a doctorate. He wrote his dissertation on the custom in the Ötztal and its tourism-related changes.

He lived for a time in Heiligkreuz in the Venter Tal near Sölden, on the "Roale" farm at an altitude of 1680 m, and latterly in his birthplace of Längenfeld. Haid was one of the best-known and most controversial personalities of the Ötztal.

Haid was married to the folk music researcher Gerlinde Haid (1943-2012). He died shortly before his 81st birthday in Ötztal-Bahnhof. His urn grave is located in Längenfeld.

== Work ==
Through Haid, had the Ötztal dialect recognition and use as a medium of literary composition. At his request, it was included in the list of Intangible Cultural Heritage in Austria in 2010.

He published dialect poems, radio plays and novels over many decades. A central theme of his literary works was the influence of the Alps area by the excesses of mass tourism. Peter Turrini called Haid "Alpine-Abraham a Sancta Clara" because of his criticism of the sell-out and destruction of his homeland. Among other things, Haid's criticism was also reflected in his radio play Mit Tränen füllt man keine Betten produced by the ORF in 2008. Haid was also the author and editor of numerous illustrated books and folkloristic books ranging from old customs to highlighting new forms of economy and life in the Alps.

Besides his literary activities, he was the founder and initiator of several associations and organisations, such as the Ötztaler Heimatverein und Freilichtmuseum (1964), Internationales Dialektinstitut (1976), Arge Region Kultur (1985), Pro Vita Alpina (an association of alpine initiatives from Slovenia to Savoy, 1989) and since 1995 developer of EU projects (LEADER, Interreg I and II), association sall wöll (das wohl).

== Publications ==
- Vom alten Leben. Rosenheimer Verlagshaus, Rosenheim 1986.
- Aufbruch in die Einsamkeit. 5000 Jahre Überleben in den Alpen. Rosenheimer Verlagshaus, Rosenheim 1992, ISBN 3-900977-34-8
- Franz Senn im Spiegel seiner Zeit. Skizzen zum Leben in den Ötztaler Alpen. In Oberwalder, Louis; Mailänder, Nico; Haid, Hans; Haßlacher, Peter; Fliri, Franz: Franz Senn. Alpinismuspionier und Gründer des Alpenvereins. Tyrolia, Innsbruck / Vienna 2004, ISBN 3-7022-2629-X
- Mythos avalanche: Eine Kulturgeschichte. Studienverlag, Innsbruck / Vienna 2007, ISBN 978-3-7065-4493-1
- Wege der Schafe: Die jahrtausendalte Hirtenkultur between Südtirol and the Ötztal. Tyrolia, Innsbruck / Vienna, and Verlagsanstalt Athesia, Bozen 2008, ISBN 978-3-7022-2901-6 / ISBN 978-88-8266-504-3.
- Das Schaf. Eine Kulturgeschichte. Böhlau, Vienna 2010, ISBN 978-3-205-78442-5
- with Barbara Haid: Naturkatastrophen in den Alpen. Haymon, Innsbruck / Vienna 2010, ISBN 978-3-85218-850-8.
- i schmeck in langes. Ausgewählte Gedichte. Werkausgabe Band 1. ed. und mit einem Nachwort von Christine Riccabona und Anton Unterkircher. Haymon, Innsbruck / Vienna 2018, ISBN 978-3-7099-7296-0.

== Awards ==
- 1991 Hans Kudlich Prize.
- 1997 Binding-Preis für Natur- und Umweltschutz
- 1998 Umweltpreis Grüner Oskar of the Bayerischer Rundfunk, Redaktion Umwelt.
- 2007 Presentation of the Honorary title Professor by Bundespräsident Heinz Fischer.
- 2010 Otto-Grünmandl-Literaturpreis des Landes Tirol.
