= Aqua Dome (Längenfeld) =

Spa resort and hotel in Tyrol, Austria

Coordinates: 47.0697°N 10.9644°E

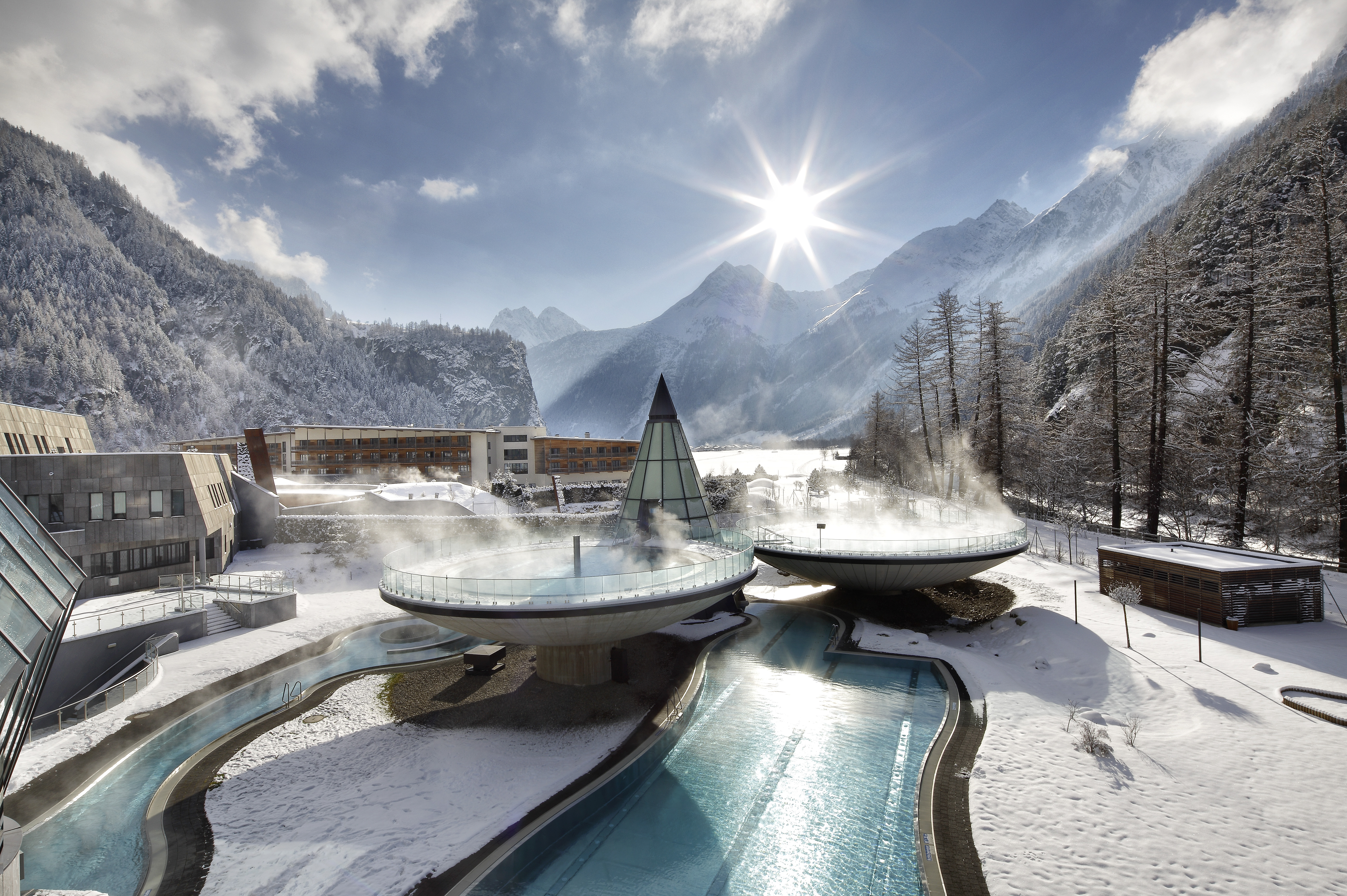
- Aqua Dome in winter
- Interactive map of the Aqua Dome area

General information
- Location: Längenfeld, Tyrol, Austria
- Opening: October 2004
- Operator: VAMED

Website
- www.aqua-dome.at

The Aqua Dome is a thermal spa resort and hotel in Längenfeld in the Ötztal valley, Tyrol, Austria. The resort records approximately 350,000 visitors annually.

== History ==
Use of the sulfur spring in Längenfeld can be traced back to the 16th century. Local residents are reported to have recognised the beneficial effects of the water early on, leading to the establishment of a simple rural bathhouse (Bauernbadl), which gained regional attention. By 1875, a sulfur bath facility was built which consisted of a small chapel and a wooden bathhouse.

In 1893, tourism pioneers established the Kurbad Längenfeld spa resort. The Berlin architect Wilhelm Walter designed the new spa building in the style of Historicism. Over time, a spa hotel with 42 rooms and 65 beds developed. Treatments included therapeutic baths, cold-water therapies following Sebastian Kneipp and Vincenz Prießnitz, milk cures, physical therapy, and massage treatments.

In 1986, a decision was taken to redevelop the source through deep drilling. Several exploratory boreholes reaching depths of up to 900 m were unsuccessful. A subsequent drilling to 1,865 m eventually enabled commercial use of the spring. In 1997, thermal water at 68 °C was discovered, reaching the surface at approximately 37 °C. Initially, the medicinally recognised sodium–chloride–sulfate sulfur water was directed into a simple natural outdoor bath on the outskirts of the village. Two small pools and a log cabin changing facility served both residents and visitors; peak daily attendance reportedly reached 300 bathers.

The modern Aqua Dome thermal spa opened in October 2004. The complex was expanded in 2012 with the addition of the “SPA 3000” wellness area and a new hotel wing, and further extended in 2017 with expanded children’s facilities. In 2023, renovation work was undertaken in the hotel restaurant and lobby areas.

== Architecture ==
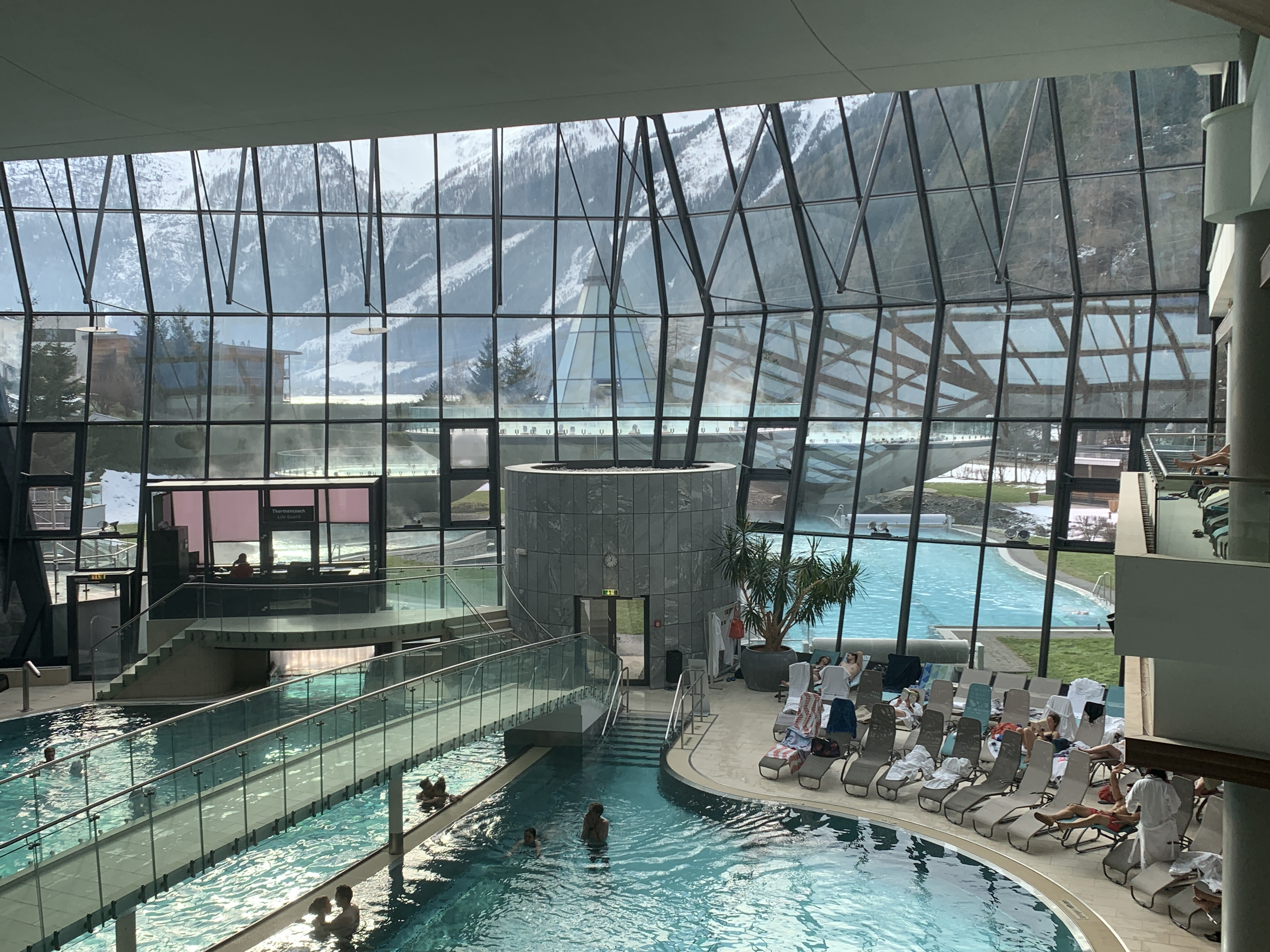
The Aqua Dome on the inside

The architecture of the thermal spa and hotel complex was designed in 2001 by the architectural firm Schnögass & Partner, and extended by Holzbauer & Partner and Wolfgang Vanek in 2012.

Materials such as crystal, stone and wood were used for the thermal spa and hotel complex, with particular emphasis placed on the use of natural light and integration into the alpine surroundings. The central building is modelled on the shape of a cut crystal. The high ceilings of the glass façade provide unobstructed views of the Ötztal Alps.

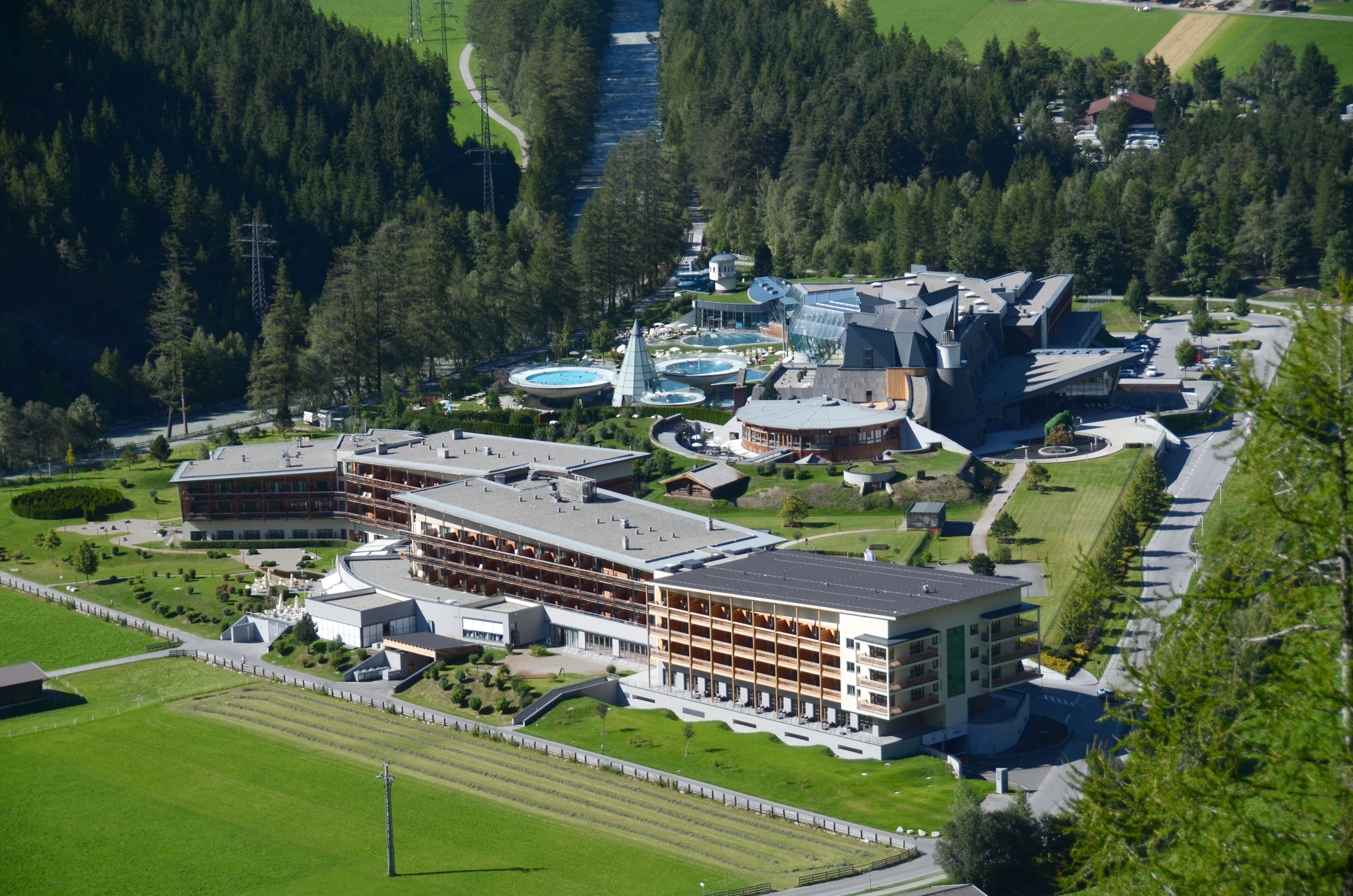
Overall view of the complex

The two large indoor pools feature a surrounding waterfall installation and have temperatures of 34 and 36 °C. In the outdoor area there are three apparently floating, futuristic circular bowl pools with diameters of 12 to 16 metres and an average water temperature of 35 °C. In the centre of the bowls is a heated and illuminated glass cone through which visitors access the bowl pools. Each of the three bowls has a different focus: in the sulfur bowl, pure sulfur water is added to the thermal water every 15 minutes; in the brine bowl, the salt content of the water is 5 percent; the whirlpool bowl offers hydromassage.

Hotel guests also have access to the in-house spa and sauna area “SPA 3000”, which extends over two levels across 2,000 m². In the northern section there is a separate indoor and outdoor area for children ("Ark of the Alps") with an enclosed slide and a funnel slide. The form of this building is modelled on a ship. In addition, the hotel complex features a sports pool of 25 m, an activity pool with underwater fitness equipment, various relaxation areas and a glazed panoramic section.

== Technical data ==
The complex covers approximately 65,000 m², with a water surface area of around 2,200 m². Heating is supplied by an on-site biomass heating plant. The thermal water originates from a depth of 1,865 metres and contains approximately 5 mg of divalent sulfur per litre. The extraction rate is about 3–4 litres per second.

== Access ==
The Aqua Dome is located in the Ötztal valley in Tyrol, Austria. It can be reached by car via the A12 Inntal Autobahn, exiting at Ötztal. From there, the B186 Ötztalstraße leads to Längenfeld, where the resort is situated. The facility provides approximately 360 parking spaces, including accessible parking spaces and electric vehicle charging stations.

The resort is also accessible by rail via Ötztal railway station, with onward bus connections to Längenfeld. The nearest airports are Innsbruck Airport and Munich Airport.

== Economic significance ==
As an employer with 265 employees, the Aqua Dome is considered an important economic factor in the region. A recent WIFO study calculated the economic importance of the Aqua Dome for the Ötztal; in 2024, the Aqua Dome generated regional added value of 69.9 million euros. This corresponds to an increase of 33.4% compared to 2019. As an employer, the spa provides 830 jobs both within the company itself and beyond the thermal spa operation, including at suppliers, partner companies and service providers. According to the WIFO study, this is 22 per cent more than in 2019. 51% of jobs come directly from the Imst district. 80% of suppliers come from the immediate vicinity of the Aqua Dome.

Almost seven million guests from 25 countries have visited the Aqua Dome thermal spa and hotel since it opened. Germany leads the overnight stay statistics with 28%, followed by Austria with 27.5% and 13% visitors from Switzerland and Liechtenstein. Other target markets are the Benelux region, Italy, the USA, Great Britain and France. Day visitors to the thermal spa also frequently come from Tyrol. The estimated number of visitors in 2024 was 400,000.

The Aqua Dome has won several awards such as the World Spa Award for "World's Best Mineral & Hot Springs Spa (2024)" and the World Travel Award for "Austria's Leading Spa Resort (2011, 2012, 2013)".
