= Längenfeld =

- Municipality
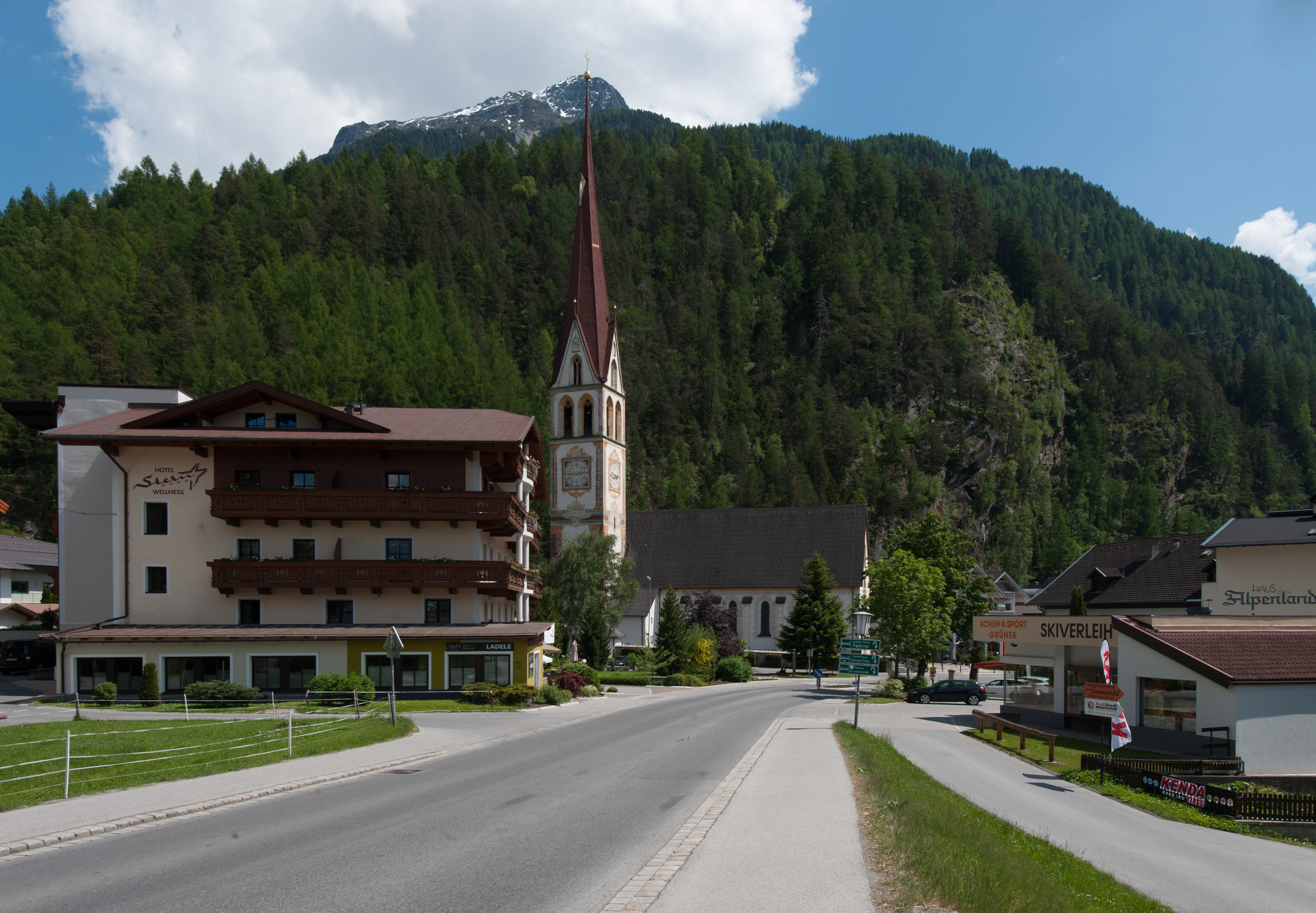

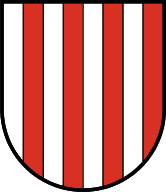
- Coat of arms

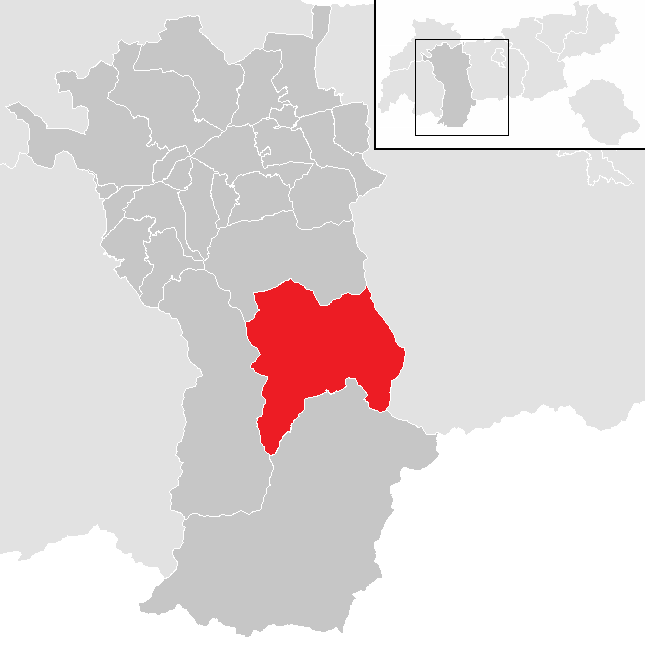
- Location in the district

- Location within Austria
- Coordinates: 47°04′00″N 10°58′00″E
- Country: Austria
- State: Tyrol
- District: Imst

Government
  - Mayor: Richard Grüner (Team Längenfeld)

Area
  - Total: 195.84 km^{2} (75.61 sq mi)
- Elevation: 1,179 m (3,868 ft)

Population (2018-01-01)
  - Total: 4,611
  - Density: 23.54/km^{2} (60.98/sq mi)
- Time zone: UTC+1 (CET)
  - Summer (DST): UTC+2 (CEST)
- Postal code: 6444
- Area code: 05253
- Vehicle registration: IM
- Website: www.laengenfeld.tirol.gv.at

Längenfeld is a municipality and a village in the Imst District, Tyrol, Austria. It is located 25 km southeast of Imst in the Ötztal valley, 14 km north of Sölden.

With an area size of 195.8 km^{2}, 21 village parts and 4333 inhabitants it is the biggest location in the valley. Sights are the late Gothic-baroque church which was built in 1303. The main source of income is tourism.

== Population ==
Historical population
| Year | Pop. | ±% |
|---|---|---|
| 1869 | 1,477 | — |
| 1880 | 1,485 | +0.5% |
| 1890 | 1,320 | −11.1% |
| 1900 | 1,262 | −4.4% |
| 1910 | 1,317 | +4.4% |
| 1923 | 1,424 | +8.1% |
| 1934 | 1,669 | +17.2% |
| 1939 | 1,700 | +1.9% |
| 1951 | 1,963 | +15.5% |
| 1961 | 2,314 | +17.9% |
| 1971 | 2,838 | +22.6% |
| 1981 | 3,146 | +10.9% |
| 1991 | 3,493 | +11.0% |
| 2001 | 4,063 | +16.3% |
| 2011 | 4,379 | +7.8% |

== Thermal springs and spa history ==
Use of the local sulfur spring is documented from the 16th century. Early recognition of its therapeutic properties led to the creation of a small rural bathhouse (Bauernbadl), which soon attracted visitors from the surrounding region.

A new phase began in 1864, when several warm sulfur springs were discovered near Gries im Sulztal. Construction of a sulfur bath started the same year, contributing to the rise of tourism in the Ötztal. By 1875 the site included a chapel and a wooden bathhouse, which was destroyed by fire that November.

In 1893, the Kurbad Längenfeld spa resort was founded. Designed by Berlin architect Wilhelm Walter in the style of Historicism, it developed into a spa hotel with 42 rooms and 65 beds. Treatments ranged from therapeutic baths and Kneipp/Prießnitz cold-water therapies to milk cures, physiotherapy, and massage. Until shortly before World War II, “Bad Längenfeld” experienced a period of prosperity as a mountain health resort. Drainage works in the 1960s caused the spring to dry up, leading to the hotel’s closure and demolition in 1980.

Efforts to redevelop the source began in 1986. After several unsuccessful boreholes, drilling to 1,865 m enabled renewed use of the spring. In 1997, 68 °C thermal water was found, emerging at the surface at about 37 °C. Initially, the water supplied a simple outdoor bath with two pools and a log-cabin changing facility, attracting up to 300 daily visitors.

The modern Aqua Dome thermal spa opened in 2004. It was expanded in 2012 with the “SPA 3000” wellness area and a new hotel wing, followed in 2017 by enlarged children’s facilities. Further renovation work took place in 2023.

== Gallery ==
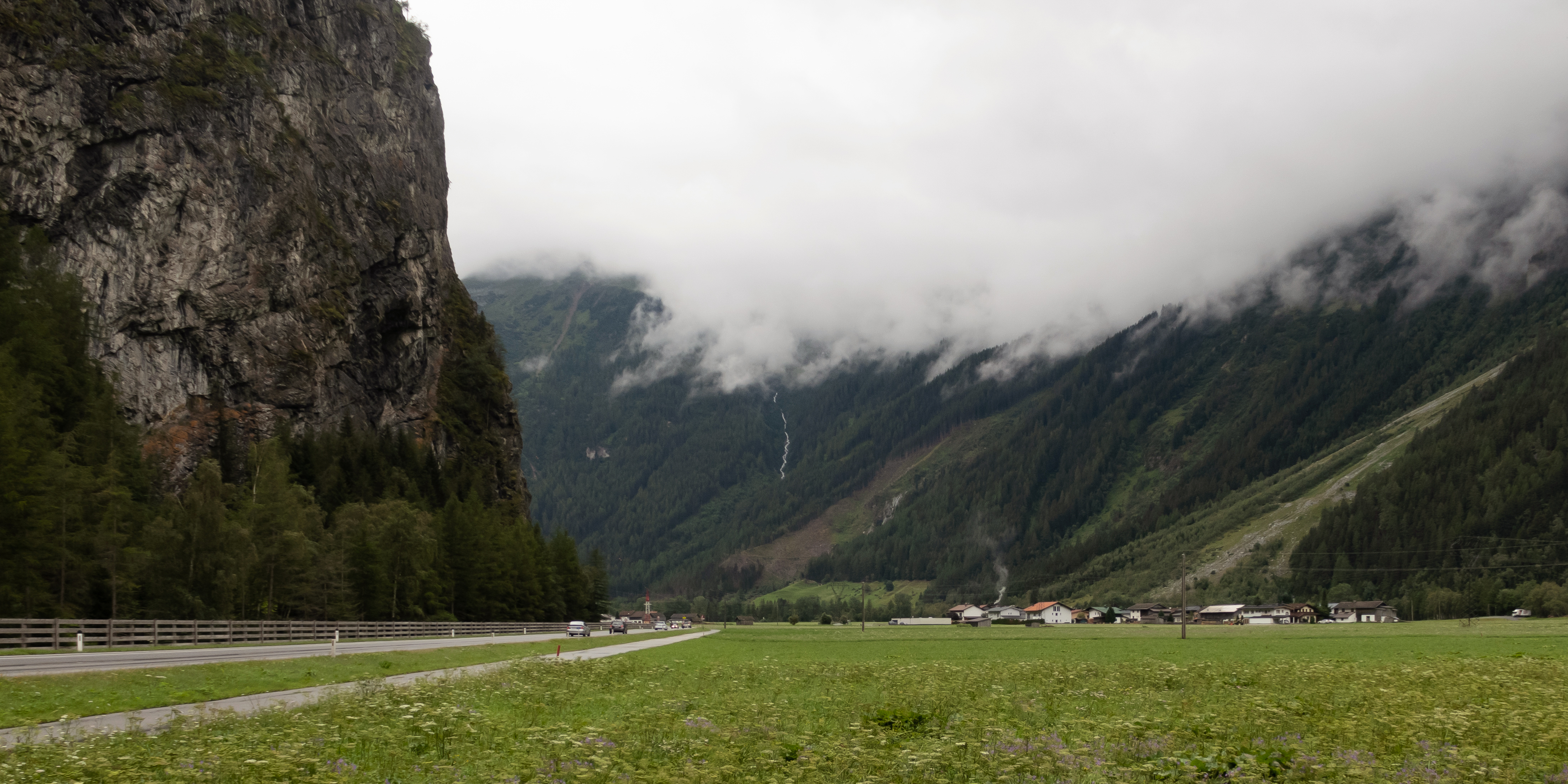
Panorama to Astlehn from Oberlängenfeld

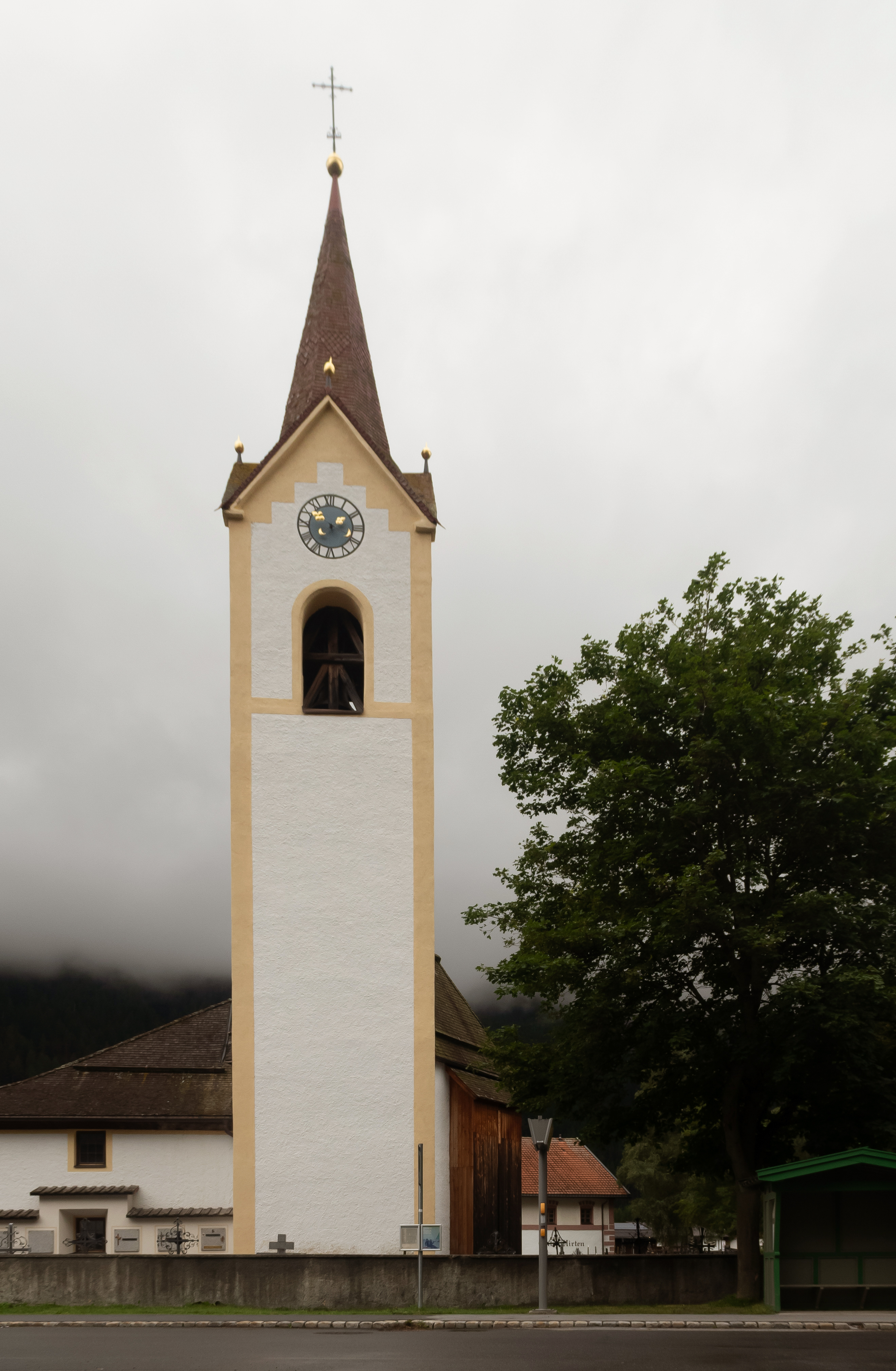
Church in Huben

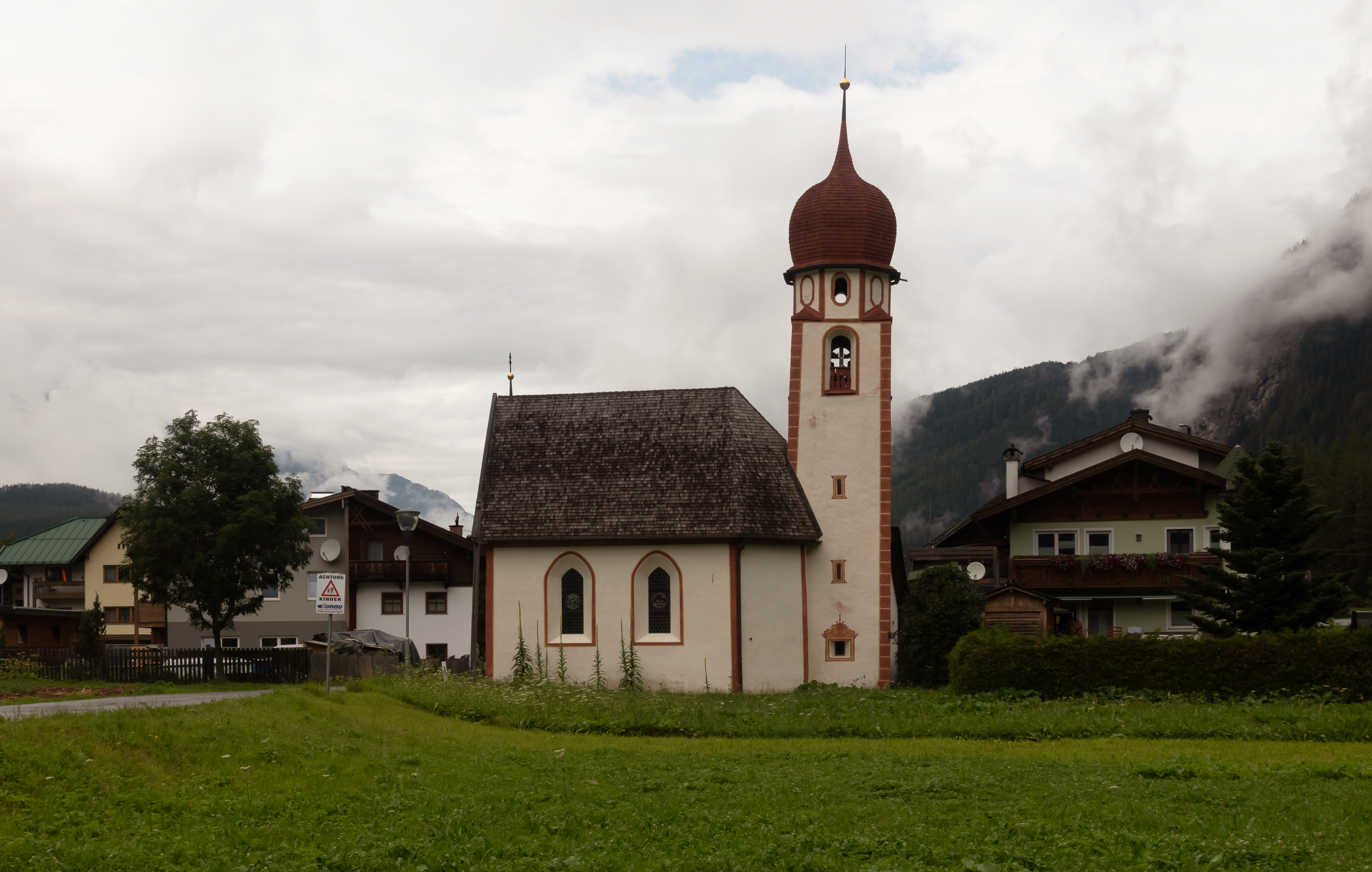
Chapel (Kapelle Mariahilf) in Dorf

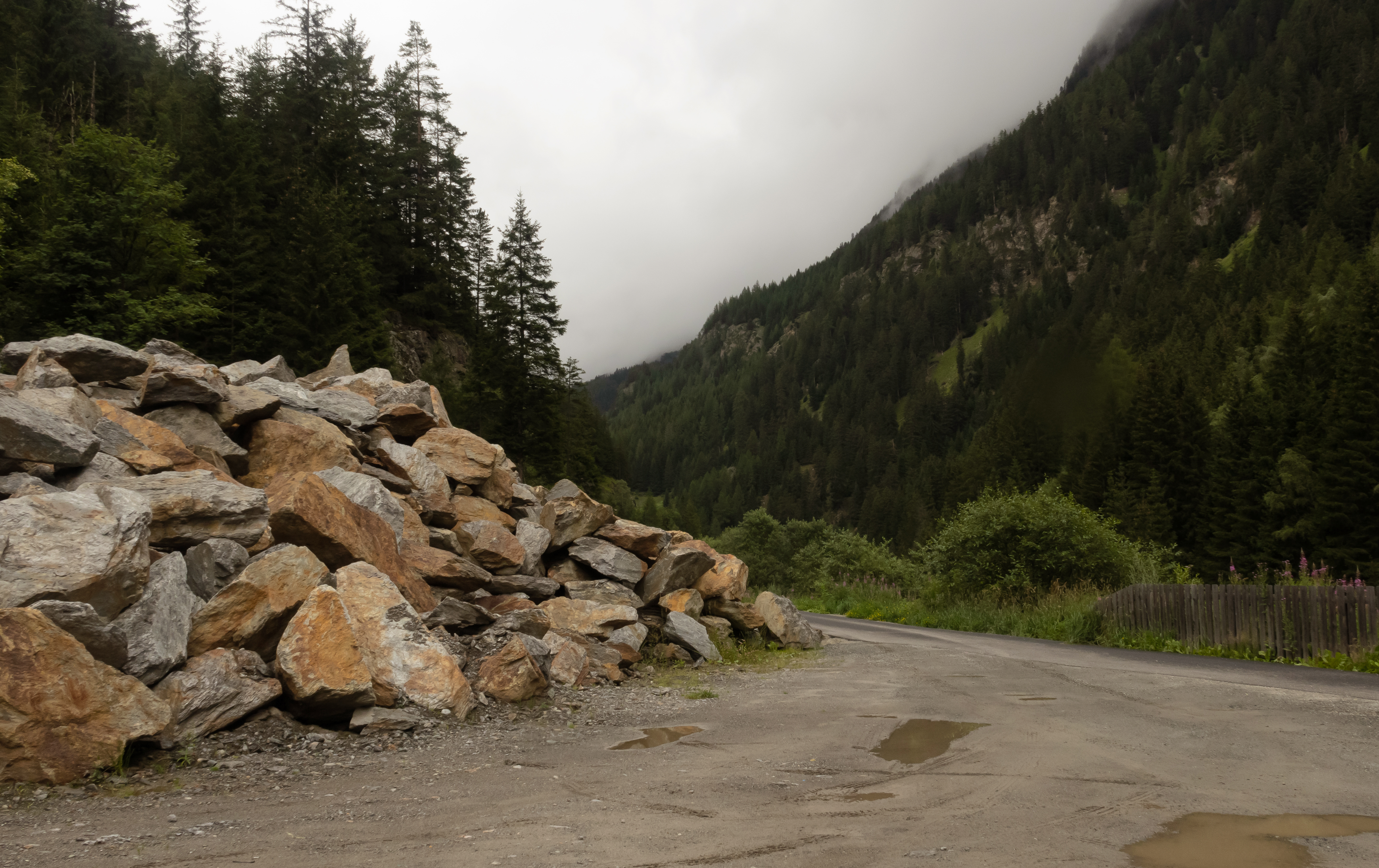
Boulders near the Waldwegbrücke in Aschbach

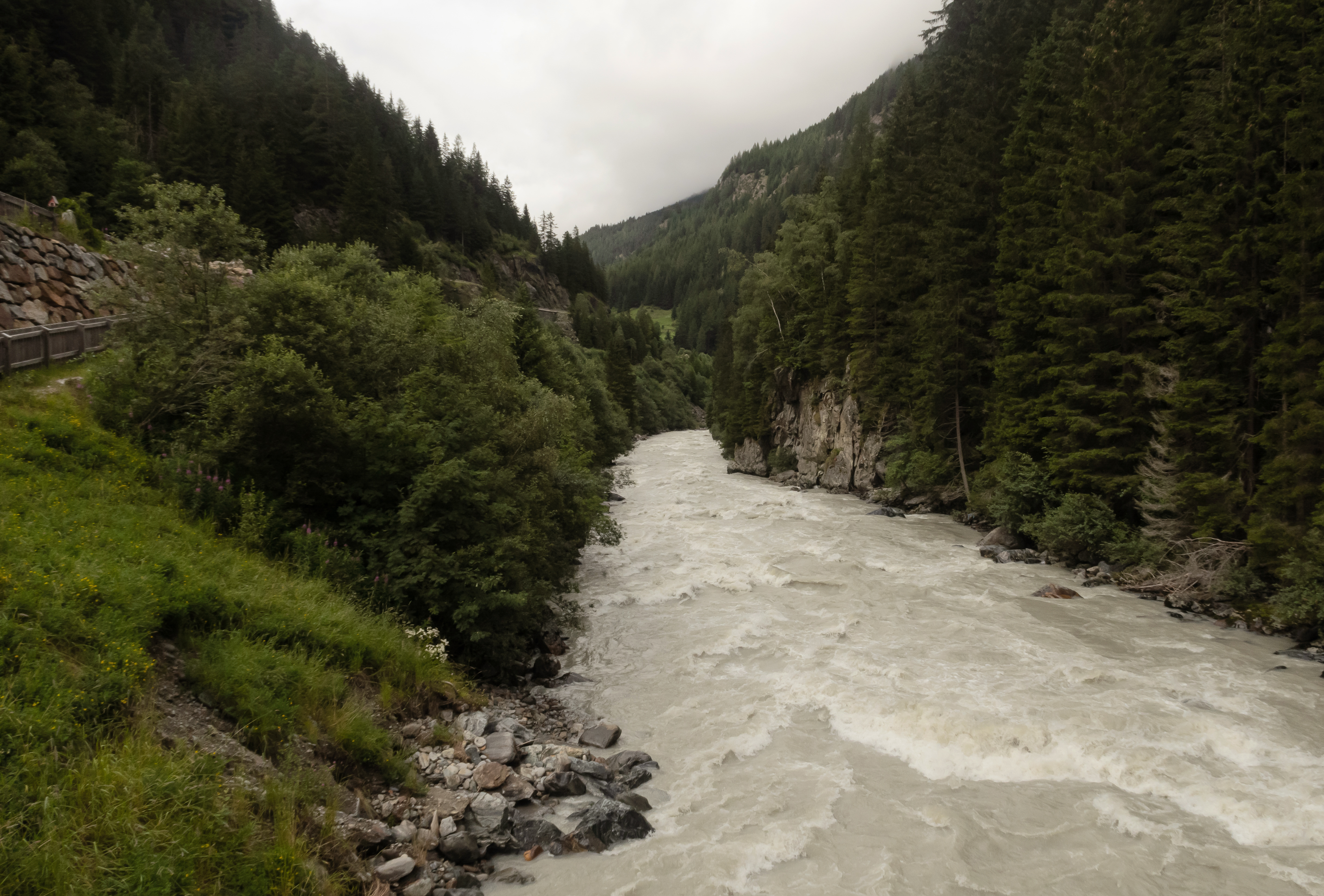
Ötztaler Ache in Aschbach

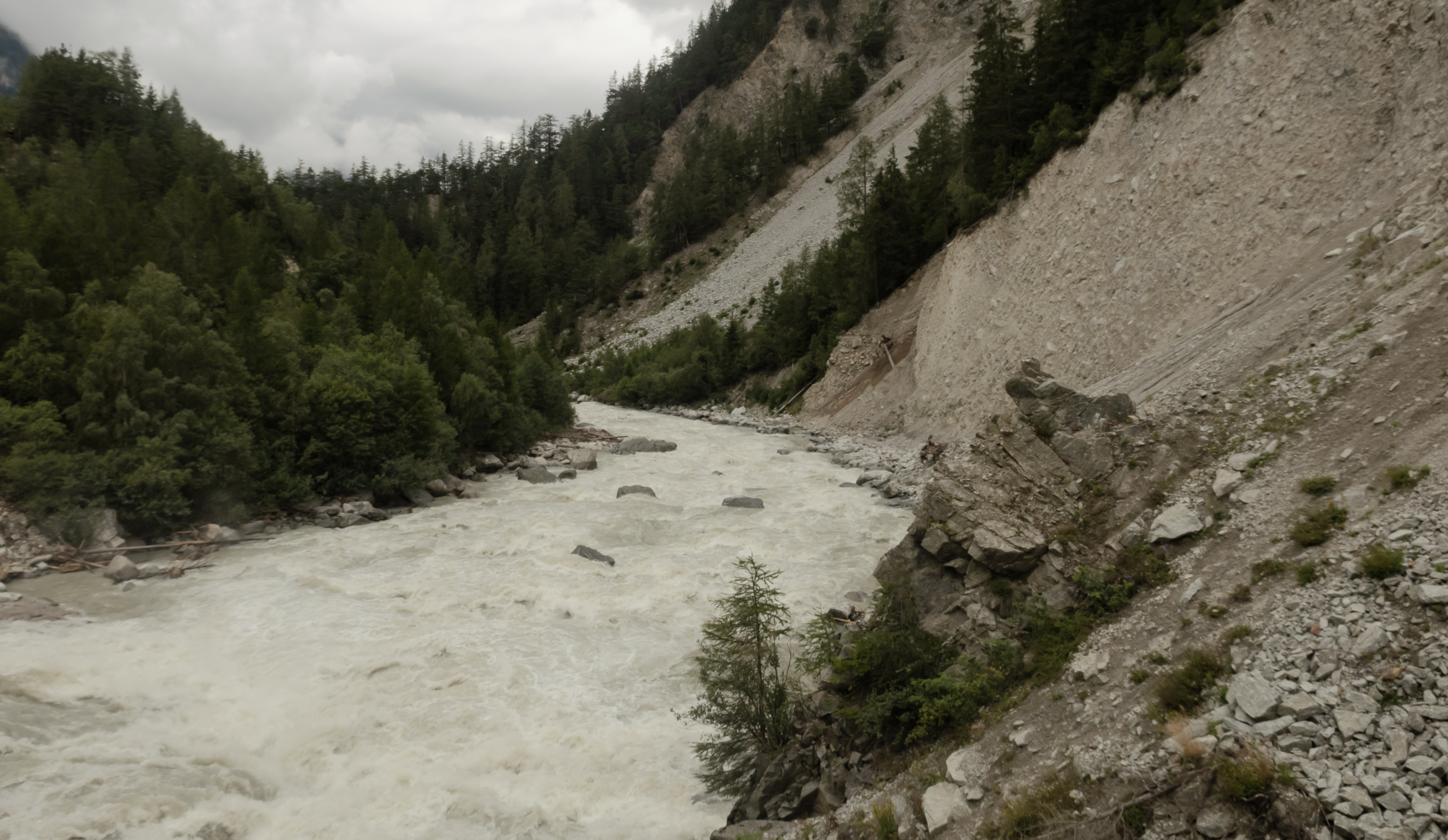
Ötztaler Ache between Längenfeld and Umhausen
