= Gerlinde Haid =

Austrian folk music researcher

- Gerlinde Haid, c. 2012
- Born: Gerlinde Hofer; 19 April 1943; Bad Aussee, Austria
- Died: 29 November 2012 (aged 69); Innsbruck, Austria
- Education: University of Vienna
- Occupation: folk music researcher

Gerlinde Haid (born Hofer (19 April 1943 – 29 November 2012) was an Austrian folk music researcher.

== Life ==
Born in Bad Aussee, Haid attended the primary schools in Bad Aussee as well as the Bundesrealgymnasium Schloss Traunsee and graduated in 1961. She then studied music education and German language and literature at the University of Vienna. In 1965, she passed the teacher's examination and erwarb den Titel Magistra of philosophy. From 1966 to 1976, she was a research assistant at the Institut für Volksmusikforschung at the University of Music and Performing Arts Vienna. She also studied folklore and musicology at the University of Vienna and was awarded a doctorate in philosophy in 1976.

From 1975 to 1989 she was secretary general of the Österreichisches Volksliedwerk and then university assistant at the Institute for Musical Folklore at the Expositur Innsbruck. From 1994 until her retirement in 2011, she was full professor of the history and theory of folk music at the Hochschule (from 1998 University) für Musik und darstellende Kunst in Vienna. Her main field of research was folk music of the Alps.

Haid was the editor of the series "Schriften zur Volksmusik", which Walter Deutsch founded in 1970 and which are among the most well-founded publications of the subject in Austria. She also wrote numerous articles on musical customs and folk dances for the Oesterreichisches Musiklexikon.

Haid was married to the Tyrolean folklorist and dialect poet Hans Haid.

Haid died in Innsbruck at the age of 69.

== Awards ==
In 2003, Haid was awarded the Cross of Honour for Science and Art, First Class, by the President of Austria. In 2010, she received the Walter-Deutsch-Preis, which is awarded every two years by the Federal Ministry of Science and Research in recognition of special achievements in the field of folk music research.

== Publications ==
- with Hartmann Goertz: Die schönsten Lieder Österreichs. Verlag Carl Ueberreuter, Wien/Heidelberg 1979, ISBN 3-8000-3153-1.
- Tanzbeschreibungen, Tanzforschung. Gesammelte Volkstanzstudien with Ilka Peter, Karl Horak, Gerald Riedler. Österreichisches Volksliedwerk / Österreichischer Bundesverlag, Vienna 1983.
