= Ötztal =

Alpine valley in Austria

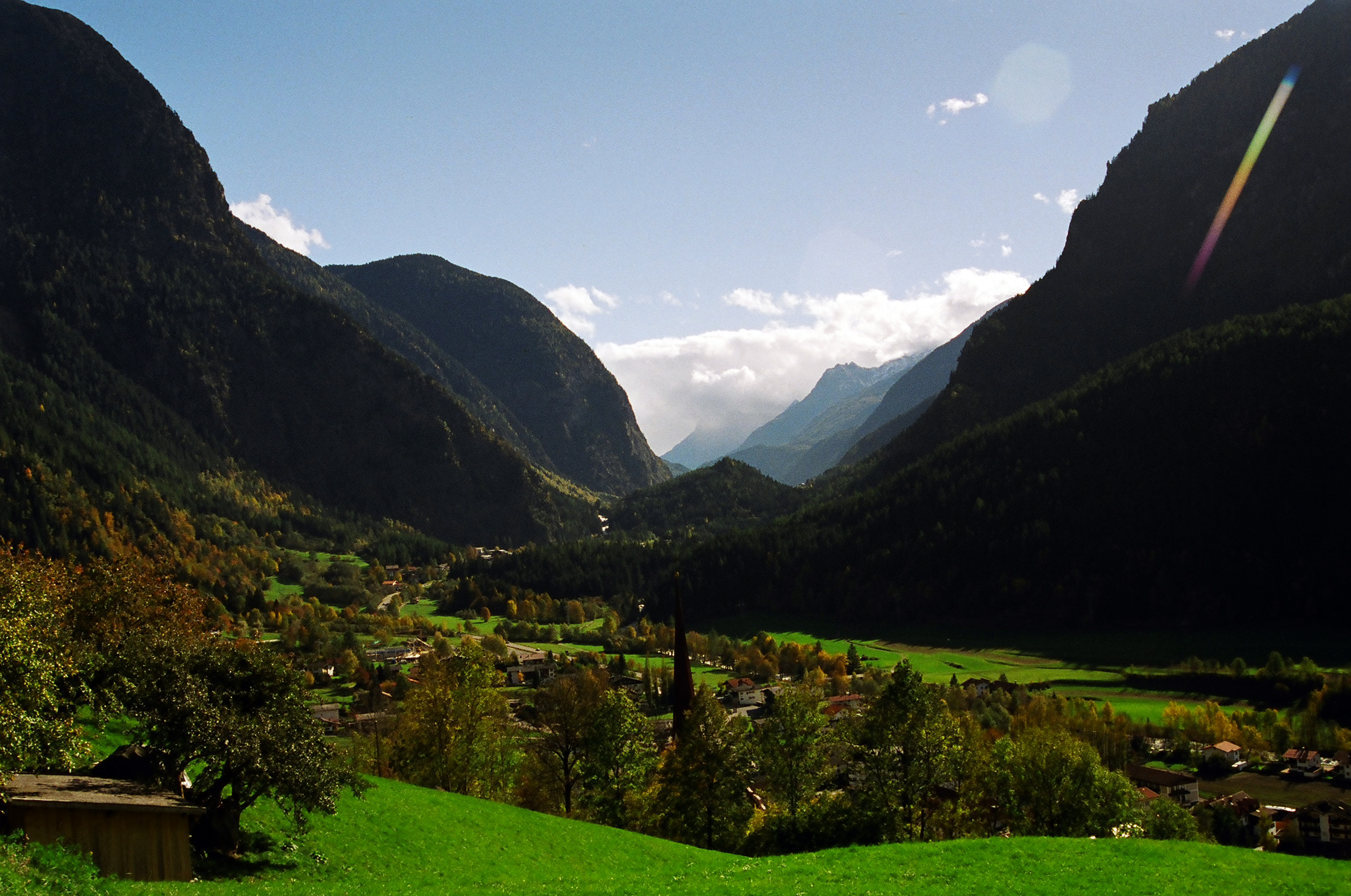
Ötztal valley in Tirol, Austria, looking south from the town of Oetz

The Ötztal (German: [ˈœt͡sˌtaːl]) is an alpine valley located in Tyrol, Austria. The Ötztaler Ache river flows through the valley in a northern direction. The Ötztal separates the Stubai Alps in the east from the Ötztal Alps in the west. The valley is 65 km (40 mi) long. The northern end of the valley is at the confluence of the Ötztaler Ache and Inn rivers, 8 km east of Imst and 50 km west of Innsbruck. The only railway station of the valley, Ötztal railway station, is located here and connects the Ötztal with the Arlberg railway (Innsbruck-Bludenz) and also a motorway interchange to the A12 (E60).

The southern end of the valley, also called the Gurglertal, terminates at the border with Italy. The valley is formed by the main chain of the Alps, with many glaciers and high peaks, including the Weißkugel and the Similaun. The village of Obergurgl at the southern end of the Ötztal is the highest parish in Austria.

The Ötztal belongs to the Imst District and consists of five municipalities (from north to south): Sautens, Oetz, Umhausen, Längenfeld, and Sölden. The main industry in the valley is tourism. The mountains around the valley are popular with both mountaineers and skiers. There are ski resorts in the upper part of the valley at Sölden, Hochsölden, and Hochgurgl. The Timmelsjoch mountain pass connects the Ötztal with the Passeier Valley and Merano in the province of South Tyrol, Italy.

The Ötztal Glacier Road is the highest paved road in the Alps. It is the access road from Sölden to the Rettenbach glacier and the Tiefenbachferner glacier. The highest point of the glacier road is at southern end of the ski tunnel (46°55′29″N 10°56′40″E).

== History ==
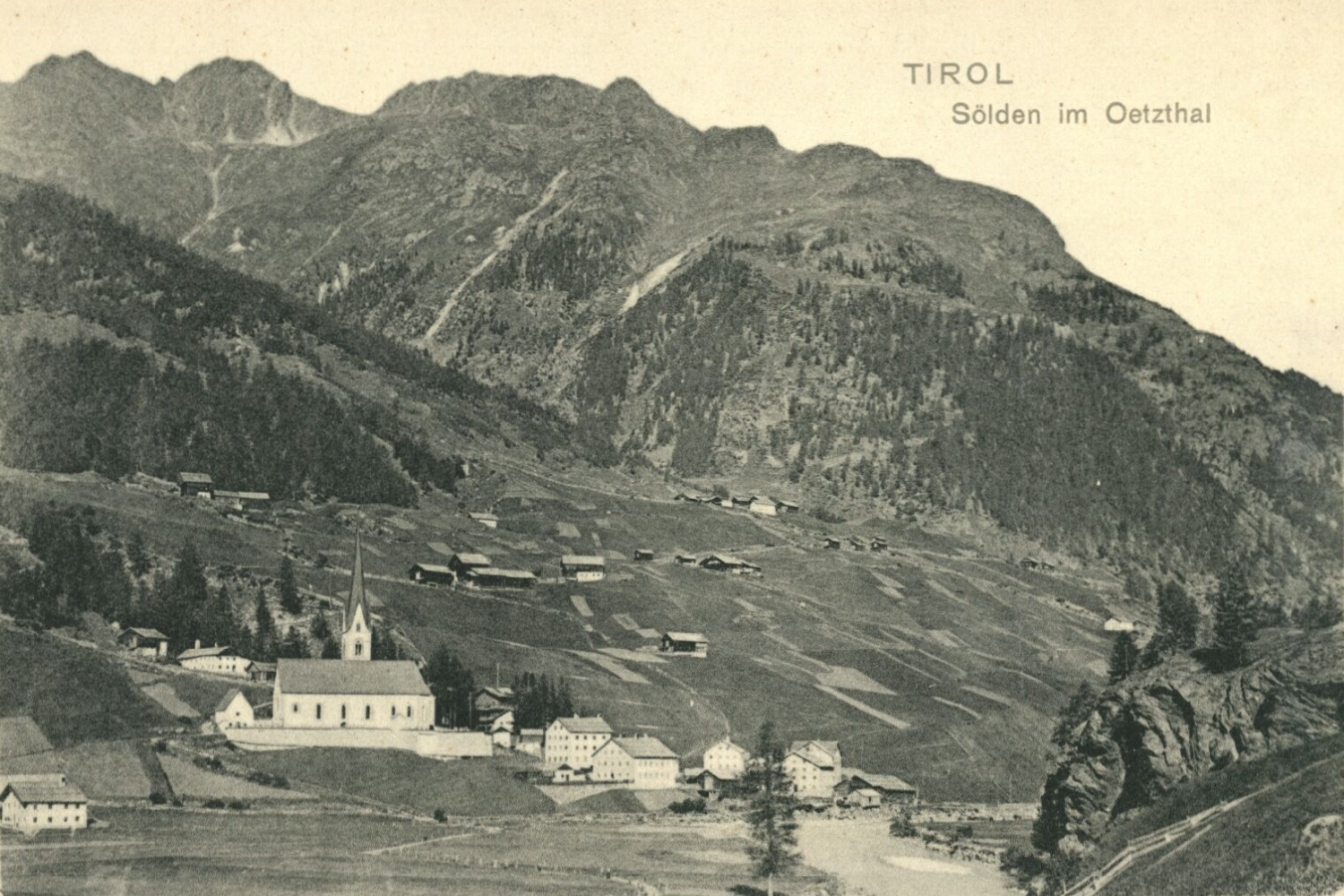
Postcard from Sölden with Berghof (about 1920)

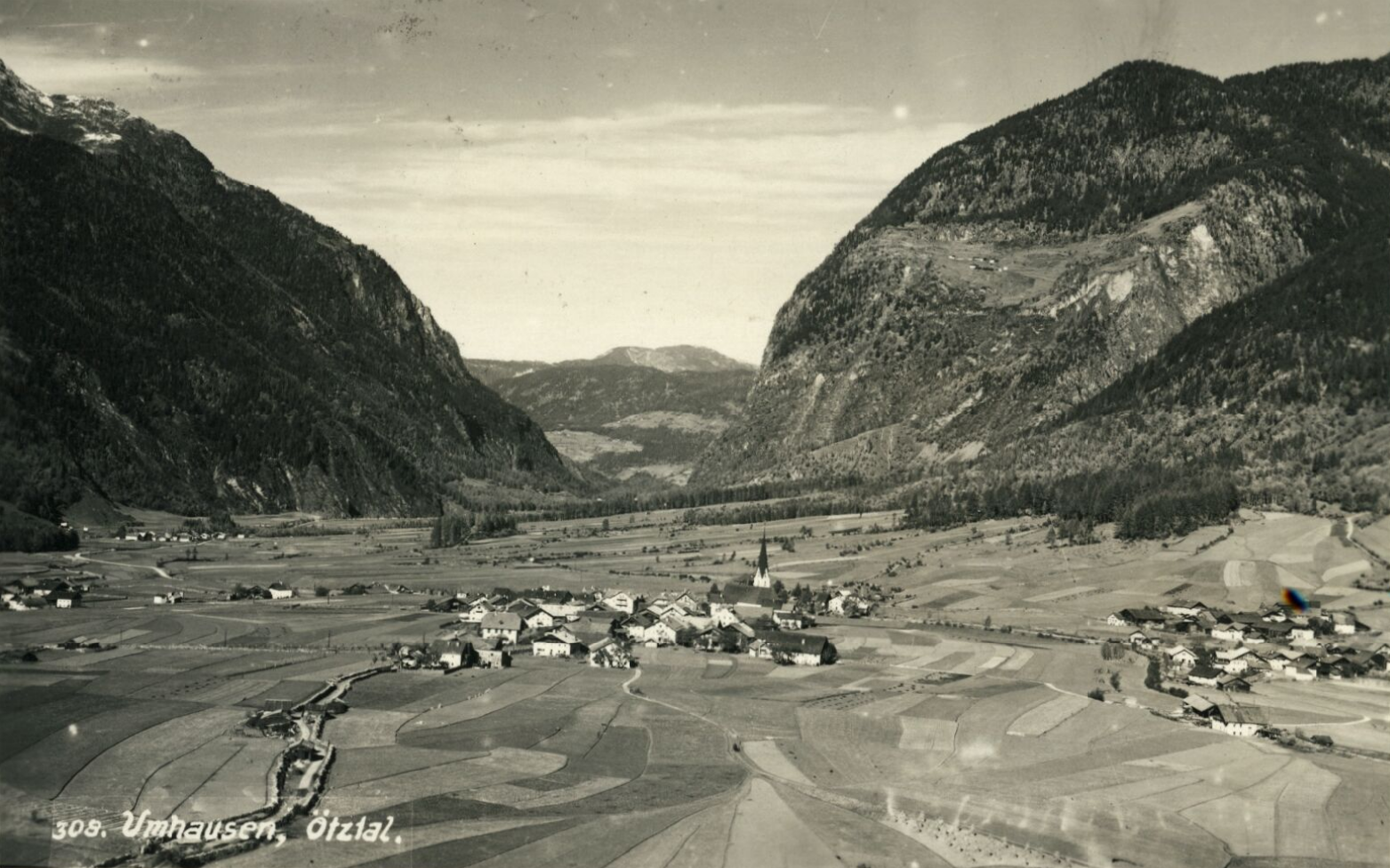
Umhausen (about 1920)

The oldest pieces of evidence of human settlement in the region are thousands of years old. The most famous example is Ötzi, a well-preserved natural mummy of a man who lived around 3,300 BCE. Also called "the Iceman", "the Similaun Man", "the Man from Hauslabjoch", "the Tyrolean Iceman", "Homo tyrolensis", and "the Hauslabjoch mummy", Ötzi was found in 1991 in the nearby Schnalstal glacier near the Fineilspitze and the Similaun. The Ötzi monument is located about an hour's walk from the Similaun Hut.

Umhausen is the oldest village in the Ötztal area.

Sölden as we know it today grew out of 20 buildings in the 13th century AD. One of these buildings, which still exists today, is the Berghof. A building on the site of the Berghof was first mentioned in 1370. In 1588, the Berghof was mentioned in the records of St. Petersberg Castle as one of the original farmsteads.

== Hedwig von Trapp / The Sound of Music ==
Hedwig von Trapp, a member of the Trapp family, lived and worked after the dissolution of the family choir in Farst, above Umhausen. This workplace, located at 1470 meters above sea level was designed to alleviate the asthma-related Hedwig von Trapp. Hedwig von Trapp was known from the film and musical The Sound of Music, in this film the experiences of the Trapp family have been filmed. Hedwig von Trapp was portrayed by the character "Brigitta" in the film. The school, Hedwig von Trapp worked, is still in its original condition.

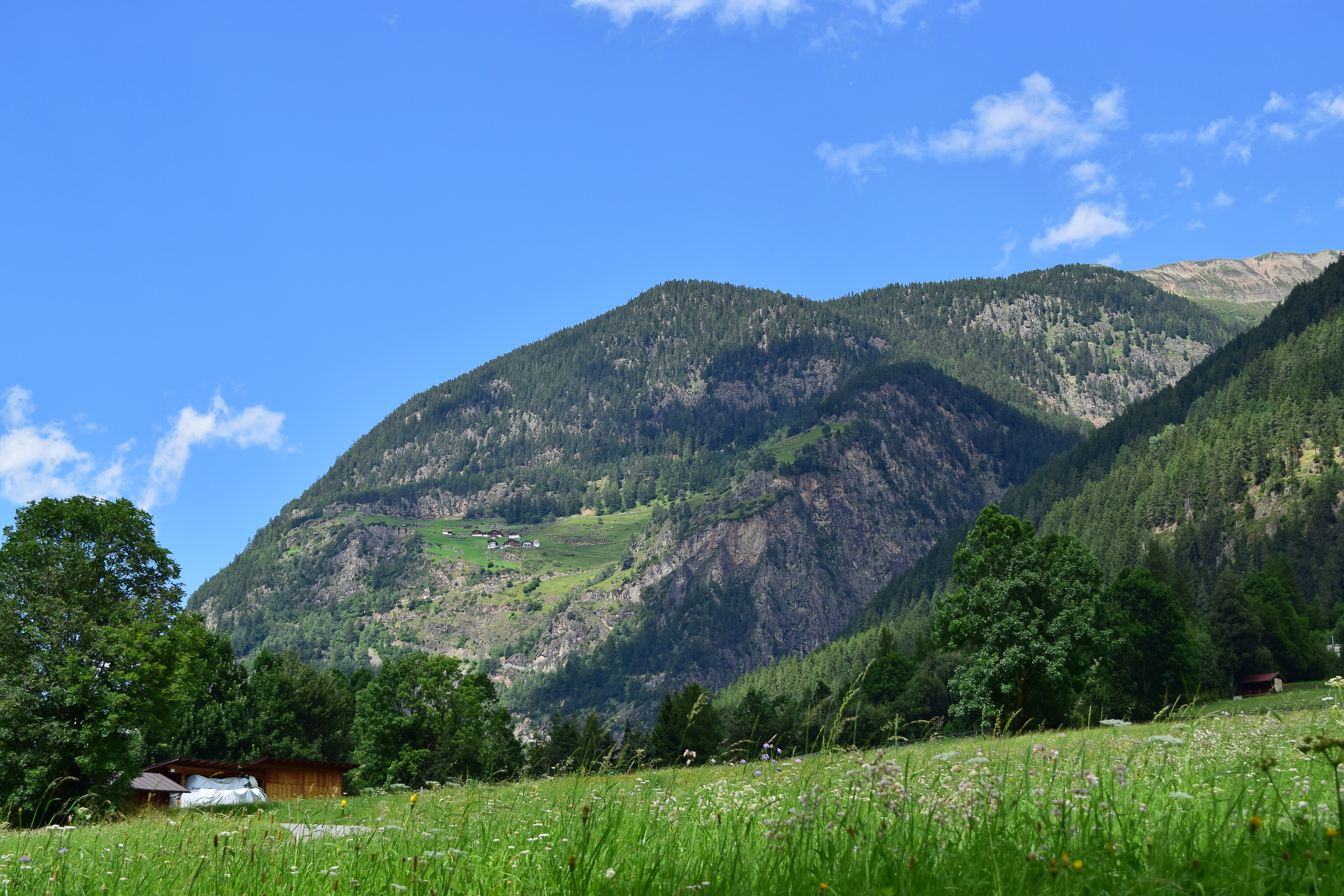
Farst, Hedwig von Trapp worked here as a teacher in the 1960s

== Gallery ==
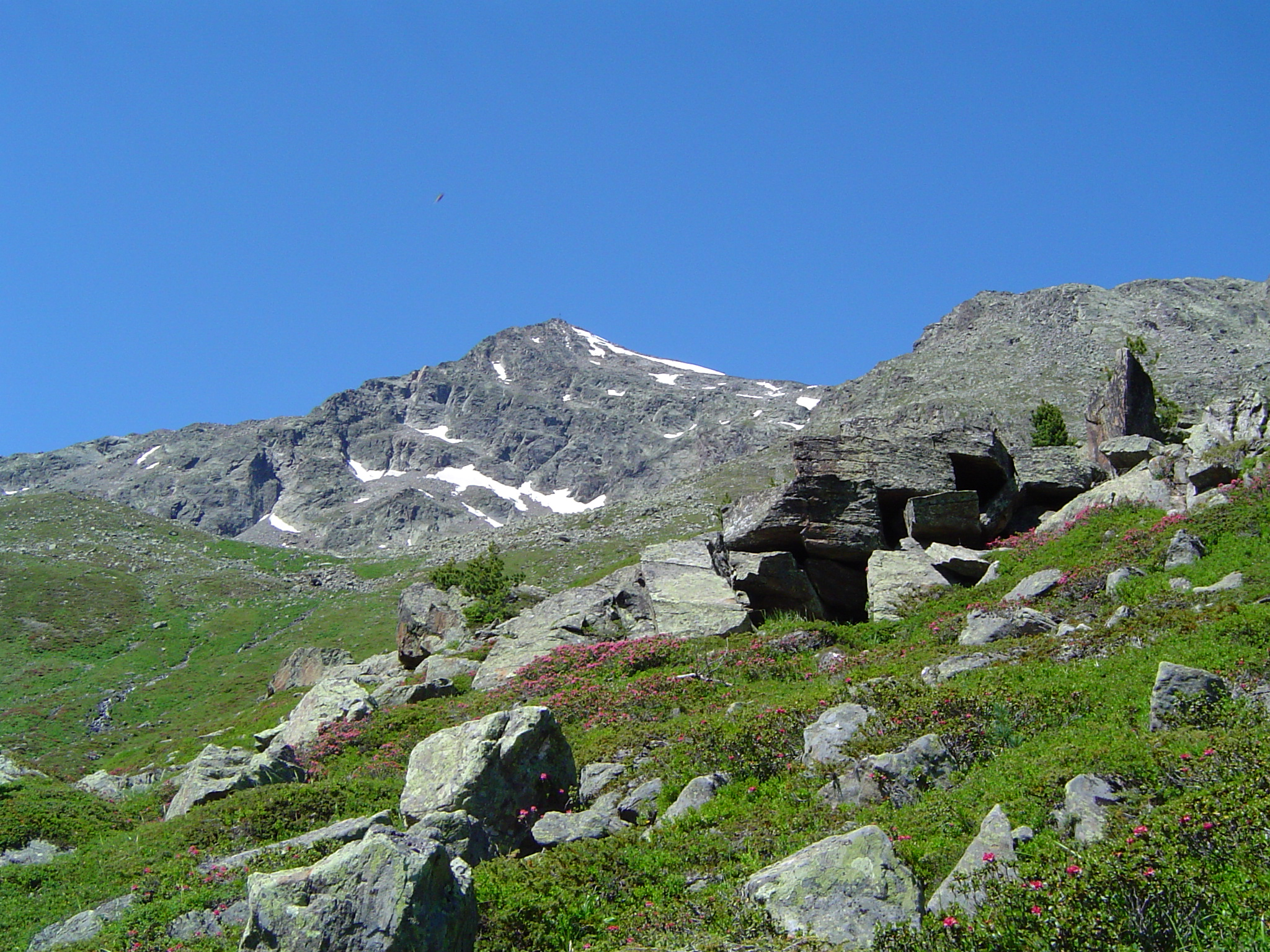
Nederkogel (3163 m)

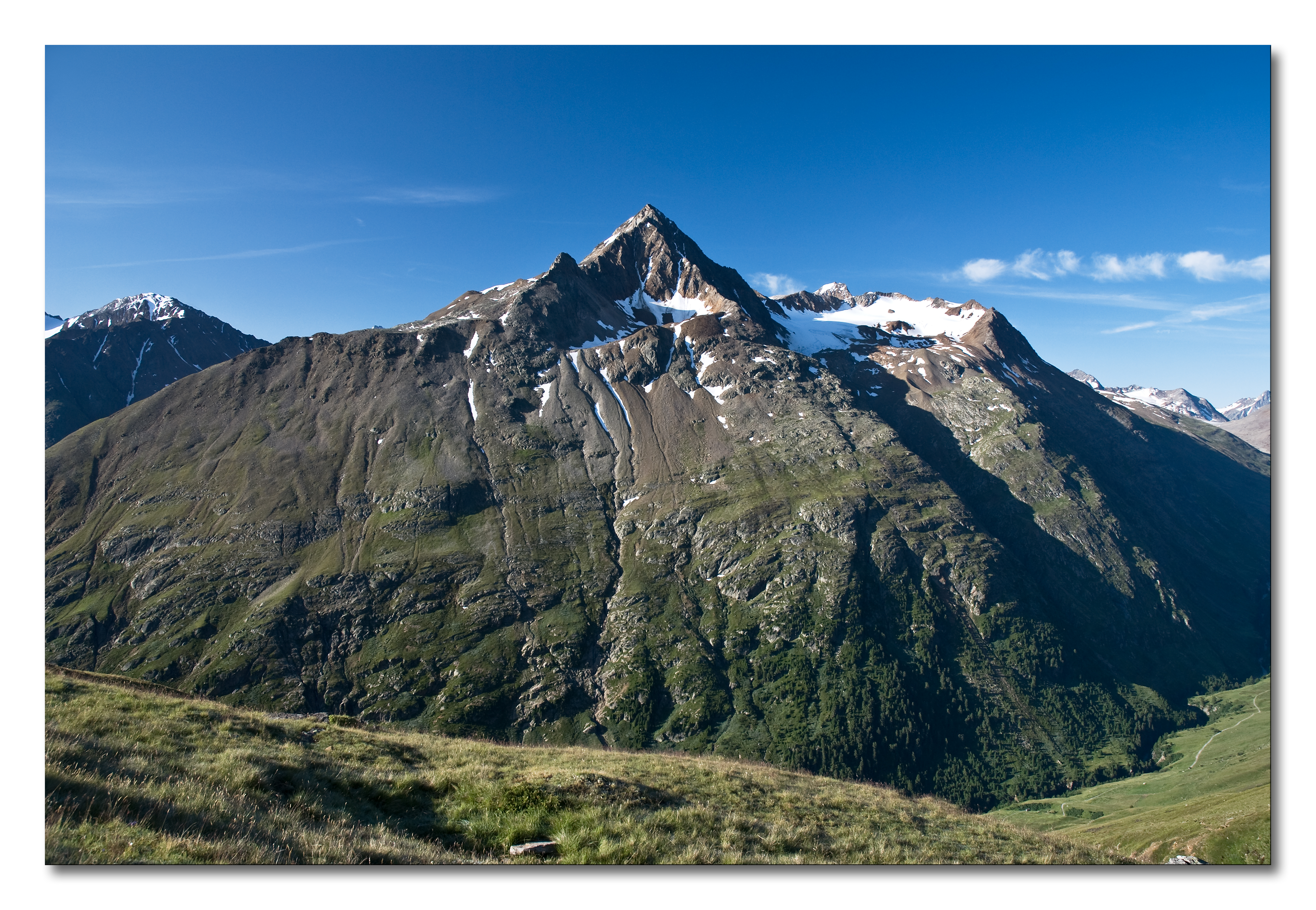
Talleitspitze (3406 m)

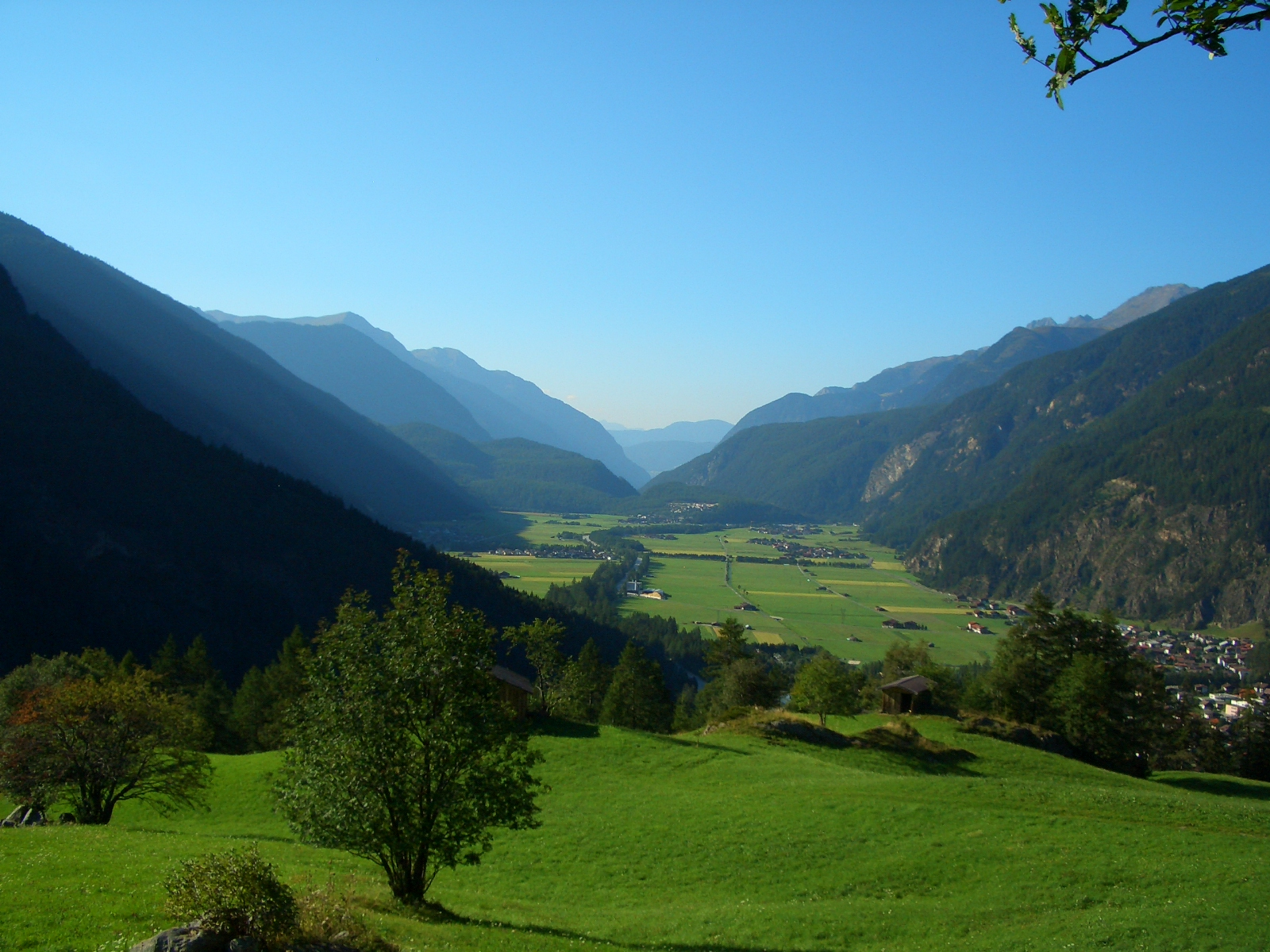
Ötztal near Längenfeld

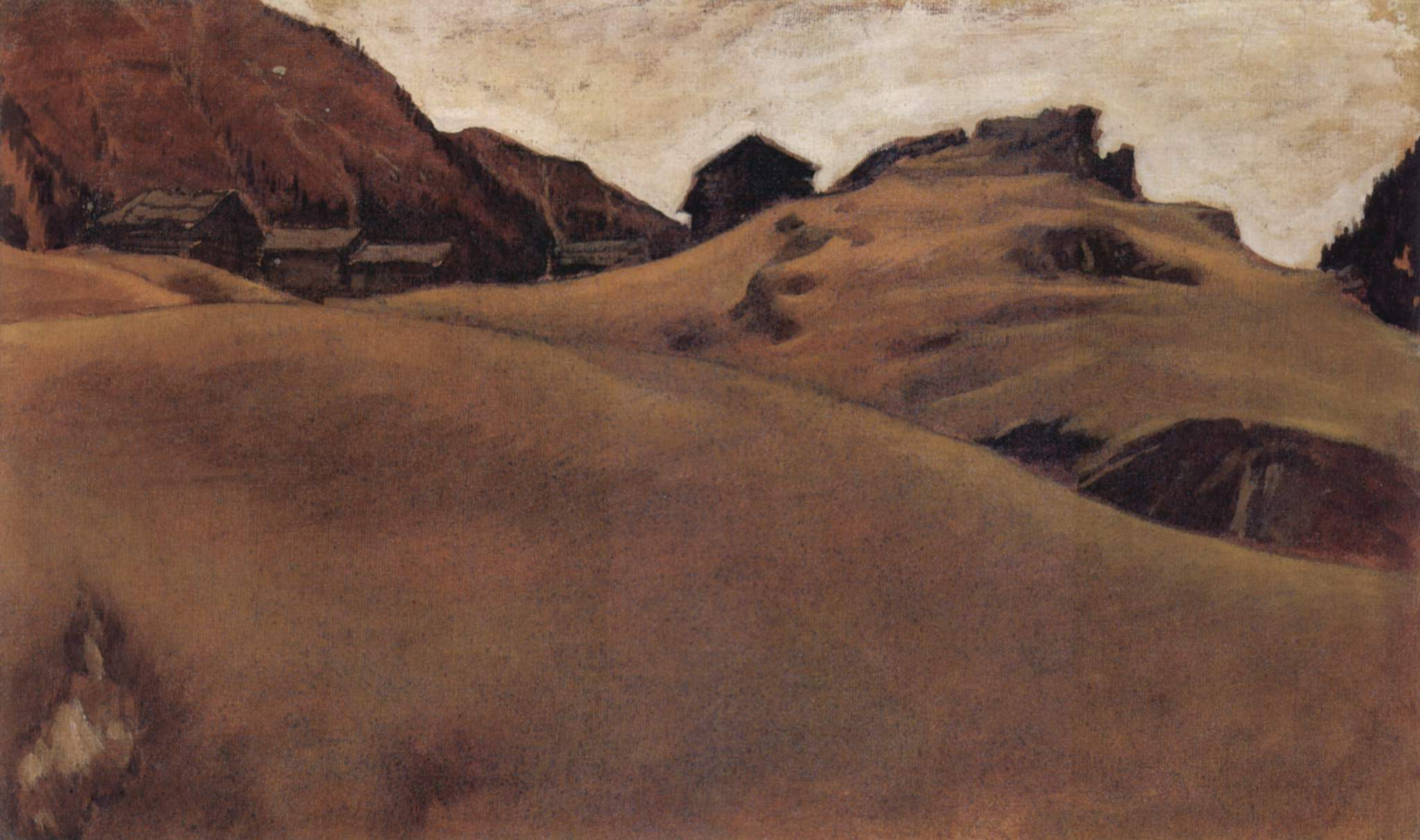
Alm landscape in the Ötztal, painting by Albin Egger-Lienz (1911)

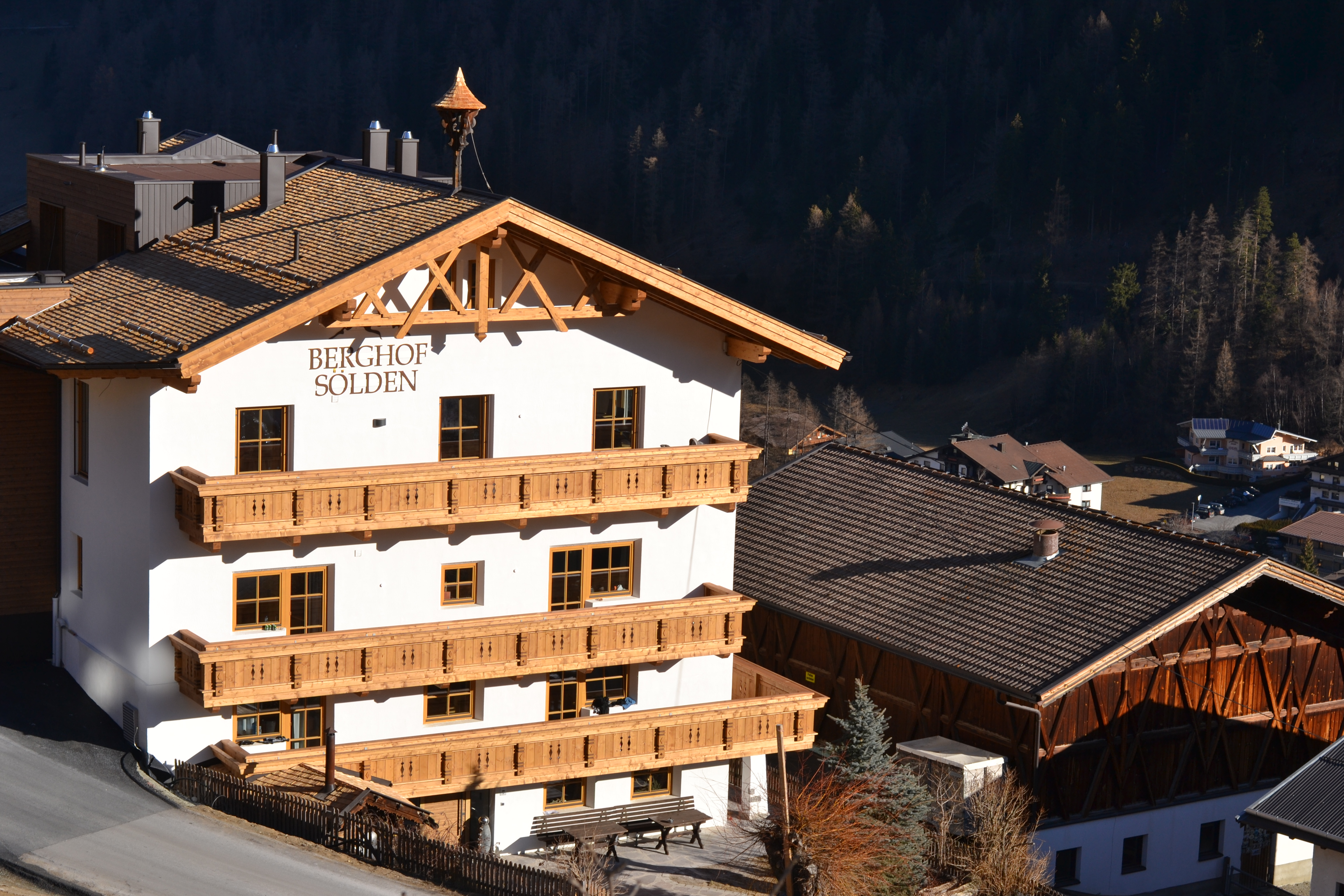
Berghof (Sölden), a typically old farmstead, now an alpine lodge tourist accommodation for guests

== See also ==
- List of highest paved roads in Europe
- List of mountain passes
