= Berghof (Sölden) =

- Village of Sölden
- Location within Austria
- Coordinates: 46°58′08″N 11°00′19″E
- Country: Austria
- State: Tyrol
- District: Imst
- Elevation: 1,435 m (4,708 ft)
- Time zone: UTC+1 (CET)
  - Summer (DST): UTC+2 (CEST)
- Postal code: 6450
- Vehicle registration: IM

The Berghof Sölden (Austrian German pronunciation: [ˈbɛrɡhoːf]) is a residence and former farmstead in Sölden, Austria. The building is one of the original farmsteads in the Sölden region.

== Position ==
The Berghof is located on the west side of the valley directly above the Sölden town centre.

== History ==
A building on the site of the Berghof was first mentioned already in 1370. In 1588, the Berghof was listed in the records of St. Petersberg Castle as one of the original farmsteads of Sölden. Since then many other houses have been built around the Berghof, and today this more than 400 year old farmstead serves principally as an alpine lodge with some seasonal agricultural functions. The house is now used as accommodation for guests.

== Film location ==
In September 1939 portions of the film The Vulture Wally from Hans Steinhoff were shot at the Berghof.

== Pictures ==
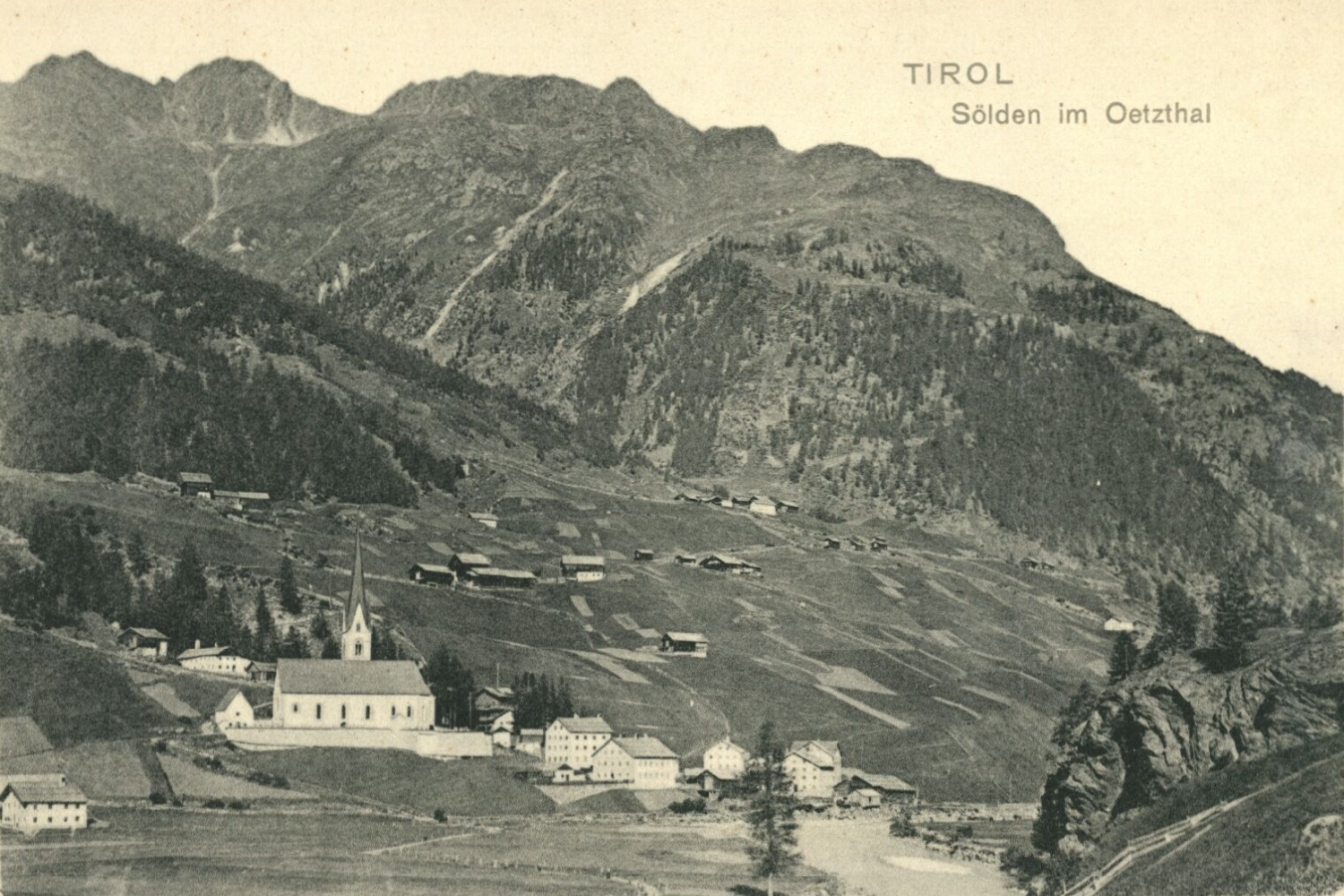
Postcard Sölden with Berghof about 1920

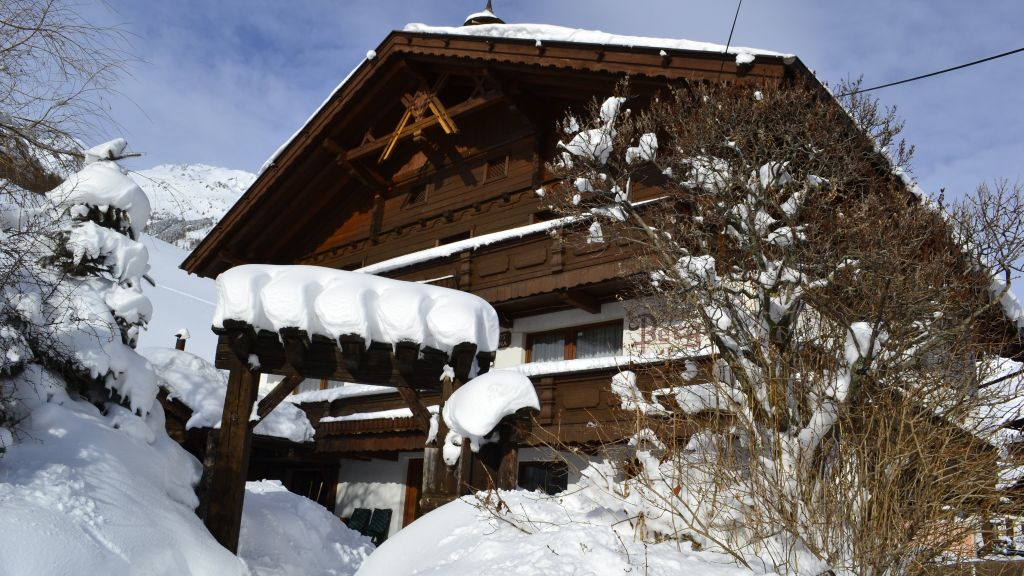
The House (Winter 2010)

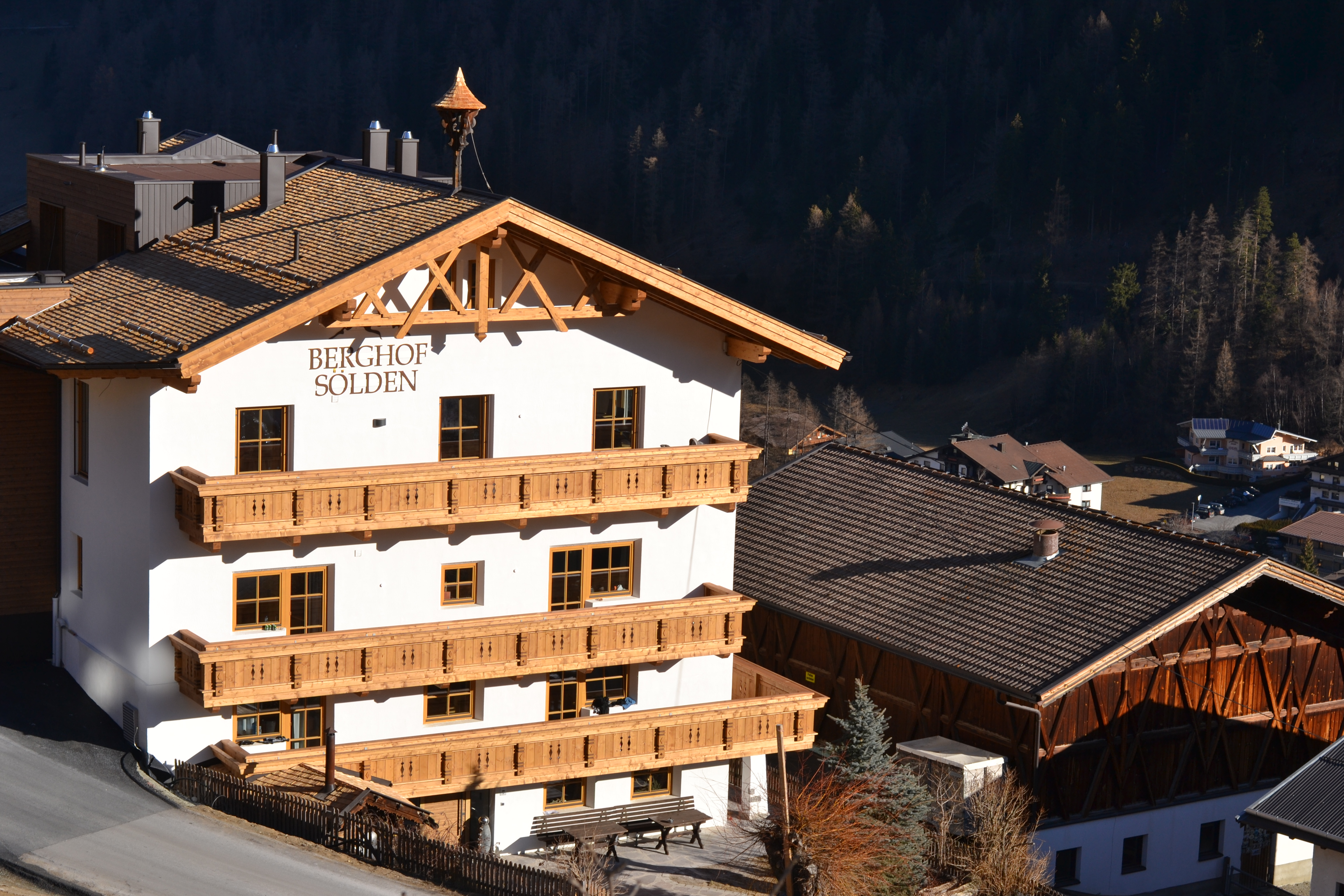
The Berghof following renovation during the autumn of 2016
