= Sölden =

- Municipality
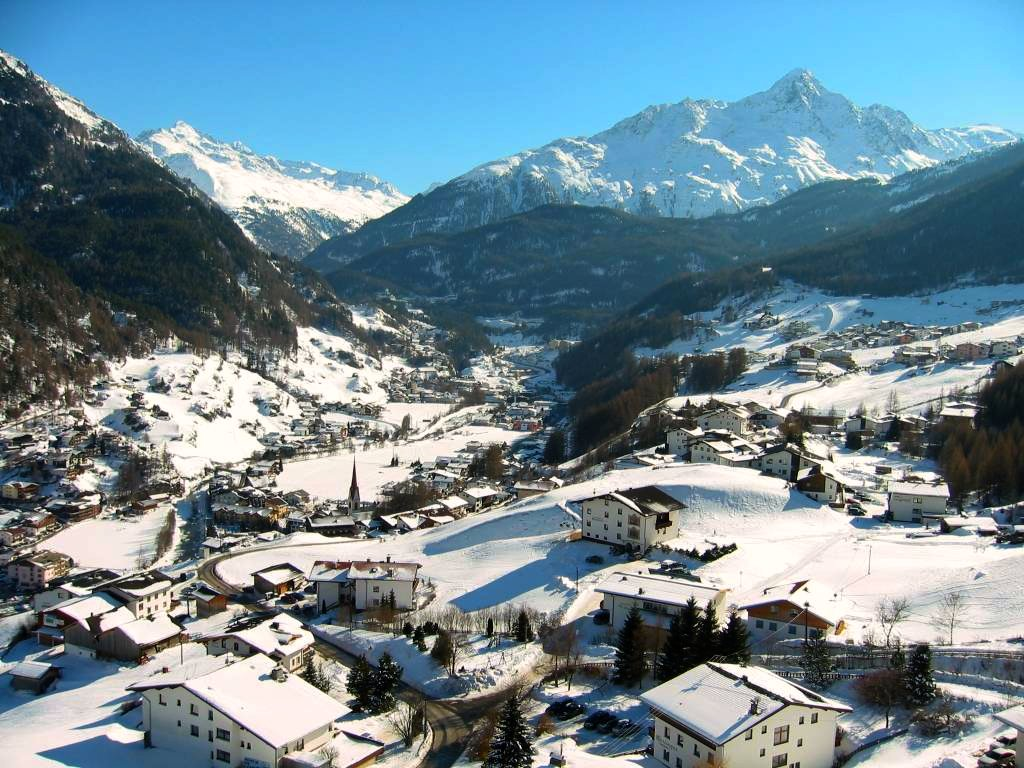
- Sölden in mid-February 2005

- Coat of arms

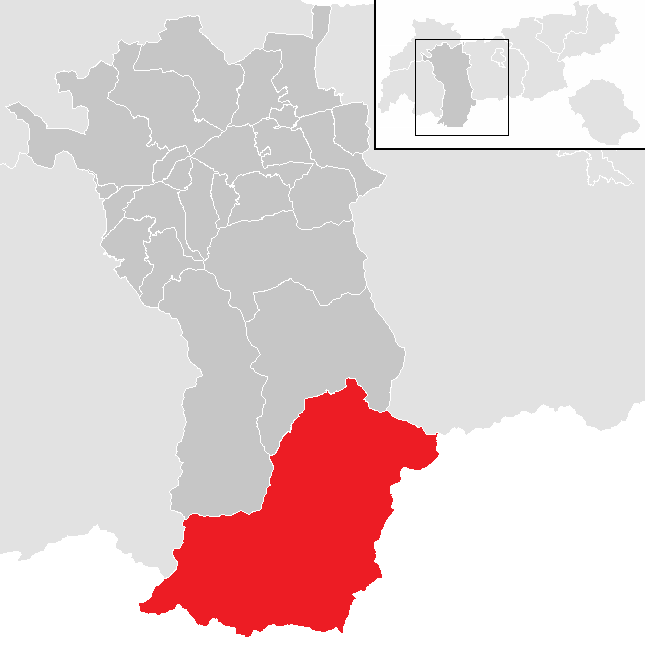
- Location in the district

- Location within Austria Sölden (Tyrol, Austria)
- Coordinates: 46°58′N 11°00′E
- Country: Austria
- State: Tyrol
- District: Imst

Government
  - Mayor: Ernst Schöpf

Area
  - Total: 466.89 km^{2} (180.27 sq mi)
- Elevation: 1,368 m (4,488 ft)

Population (2021)
  - Total: 2,955
  - Density: 6.329/km^{2} (16.39/sq mi)
- Time zone: UTC+1 (CET)
  - Summer (DST): UTC+2 (CEST)
- Postal code: 6450
- Area code: 05254
- Vehicle registration: IM
- Website: soelden.tirol.gv.at

Sölden (Austrian German pronunciation: [ˈsœldn̩]) is a municipality in the Ötztal valley of Tyrol, Austria.

== Geography ==
At c. 467 km^{2} (180 sq mi), it is the largest municipality in the country. The population of 3,449 (as of 2003) is outnumbered by tourists, of which 15,000 can be accommodated. With tourist bed nights running at over two million per year, the municipality is third only to Vienna and Salzburg as an Austrian tourist destination. Sölden has lost some of its former small village charm, but other attractions have been enhanced in recent years.

The main village of Sölden is at an elevation of 1,368 metres (4,488 ft) above sea level, and the upper village of Hochsölden at 2,090 m (6,857 ft) has 5 four-star hotels. The highest peak is the Wildspitze, at 3,768 m (12,362 ft), the second highest mountain in Austria, after the Großglockner.

The Ötztal Glacier Road is the second highest paved road in Europe. It is the access road from Sölden to the Rettenbach glacier and Tiefenbachferner glaciers in the Ötztal Alps.

The English spelling of the town is "Soelden". One may come across websites and directions using this spelling of the town.

== History ==
=== Population ===
Historical population
Year	Pop.	±%
1869	968	—
1880	1,054	+8.9%
1890	1,080	+2.5%
1900	1,070	−0.9%
1910	1,095	+2.3%
1923	1,098	+0.3%
1934	1,407	+28.1%
1939	1,604	+14.0%
1951	1,660	+3.5%
1961	1,886	+13.6%
1971	2,372	+25.8%
1981	2,499	+5.4%
1991	2,738	+9.6%
2001	3,066	+12.0%
2011	4,113	+34.1%

=== Settlement ===
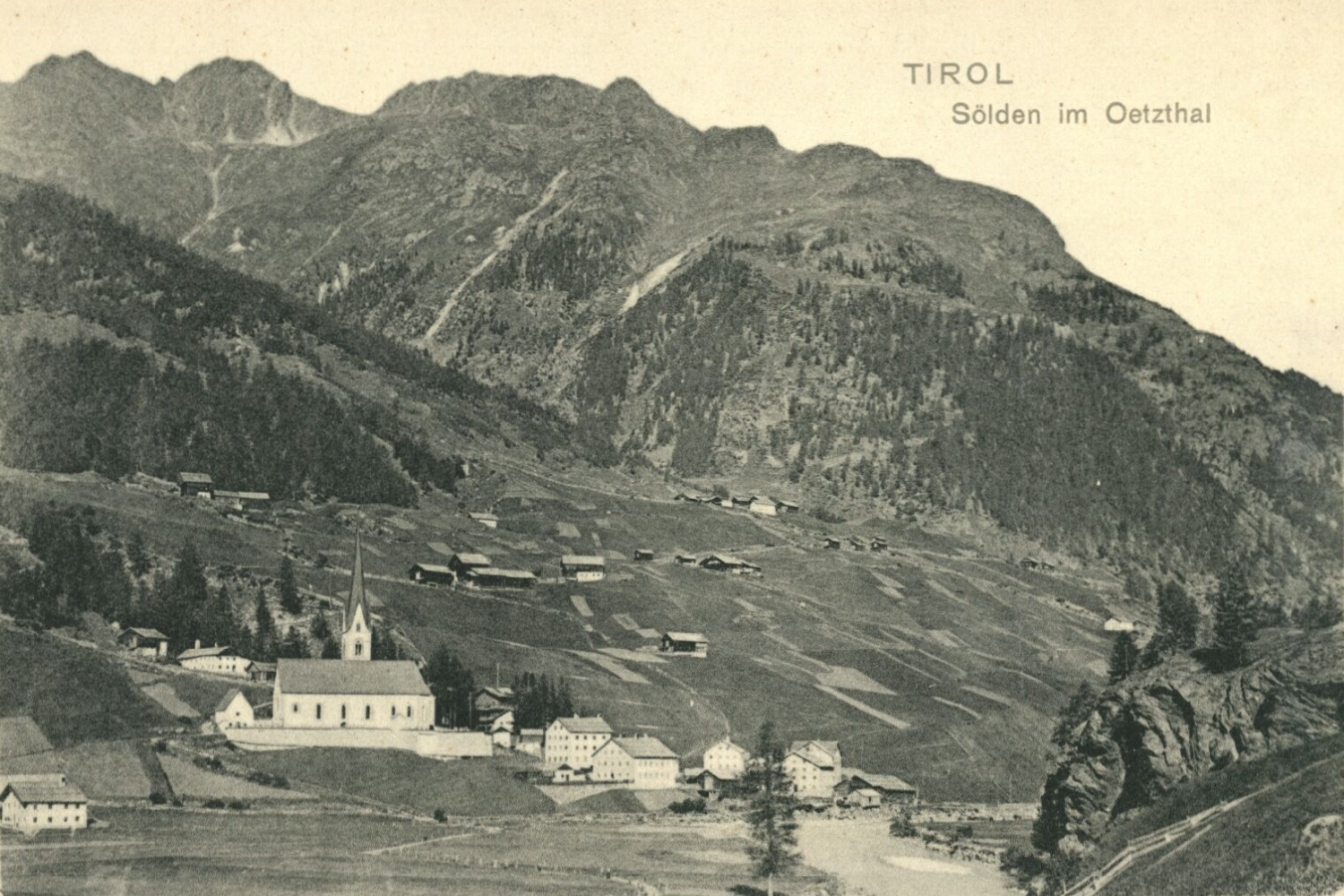
Postcard from Sölden with Berghof (about 1920)

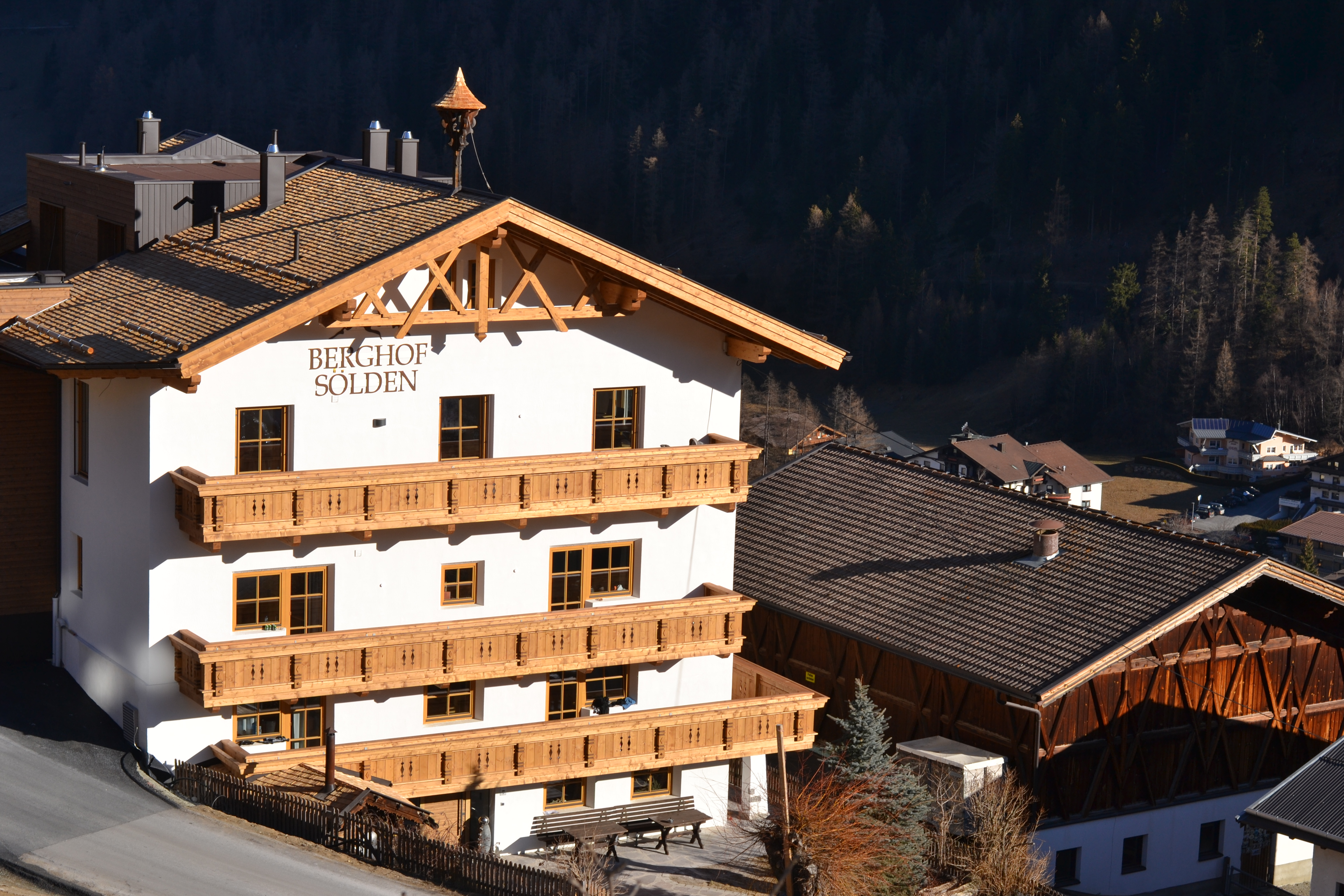
Berghof, origin homestead

Primitive tools found near present-day Sölden suggest that the region has been settled for thousands of years. Ötzi, a famously well-preserved mummy of a man who lived between 3400 and 3100 BC, was found in the Ötztal Alps near Sölden. Sölden as we know it today grew out of 20 buildings in the 13th century AD. One of these buildings which still exists today is the Berghof. A building on the site of the Berghof was first mentioned in 1370. In 1588, the Berghof was listed in the records of St. Petersberg Castle as one of the original farmsteads. The house is now used as accommodation for guests.

== Ski resort ==
Sölden is also a popular ski resort and regularly hosts the first World Cup races of the season; a giant slalom for both men and women is usually scheduled for late October on the Rettenbach glacier. The races in October 2016 started at 3,040 m (9,974 ft) and finished at 2,670 m (8,760 ft), a vertical drop of 370 m (1,214 ft).

- Elevation: 1,350 m (4,429 ft) (Sölden village) - 3,250 m (10,663 ft)
- Lifts: 33
- Terrain: 146 km (91 mi) total - (62 km (39 mi) red, 51 km (32 mi) blue, 27 km (17 mi) black, 6 km (4 mi) Skiroute).

== Transport ==
The nearest airports are Innsbruck Airport, located 83 km (52 mi) north east and Munich Airport, located 230 km (140 mi) north of Sölden.
