= Innsbruck =

Capital city of Tyrol, Austria

Innsbruck Innschbrugg (Bavarian)
- Statutory city
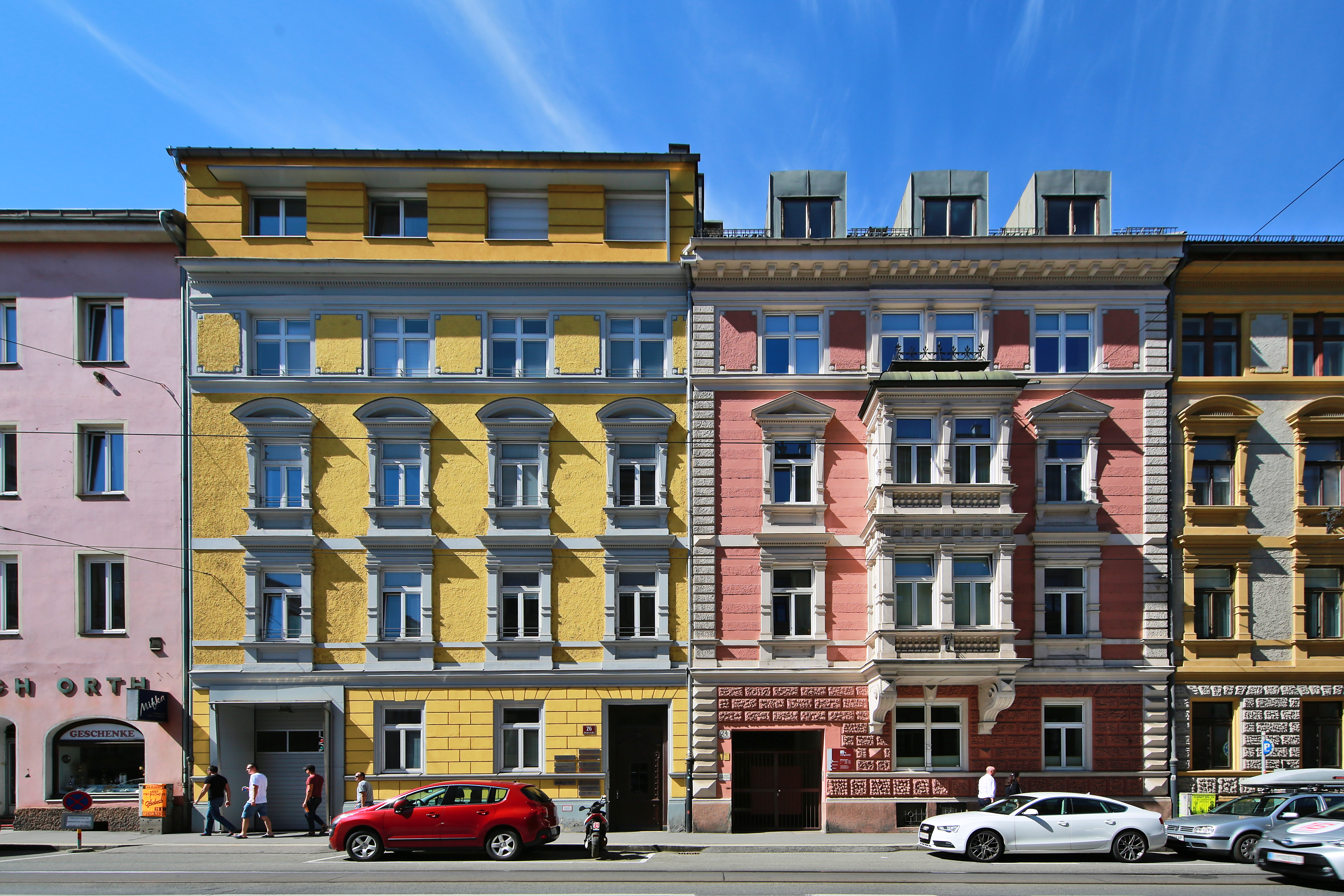
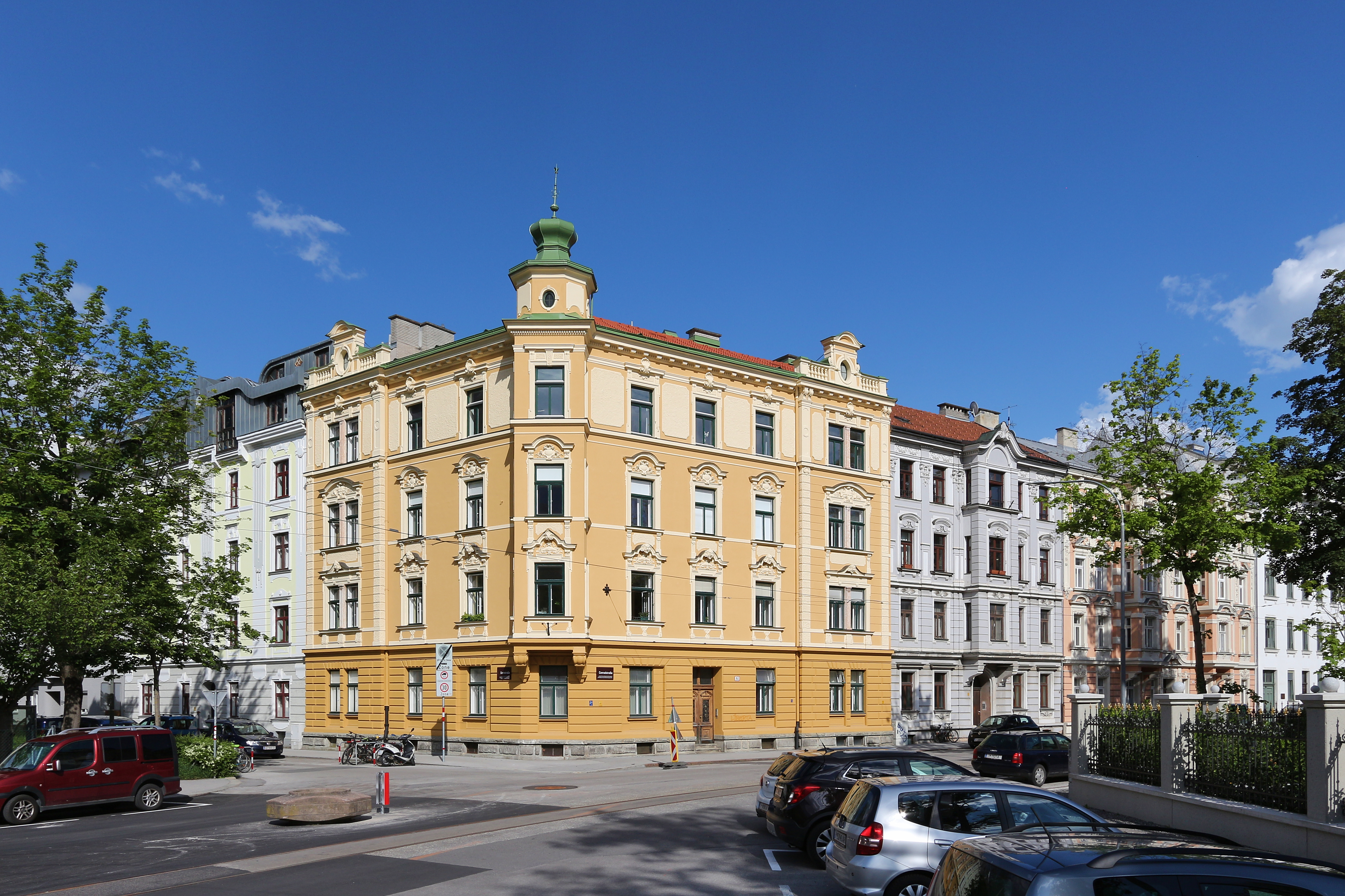
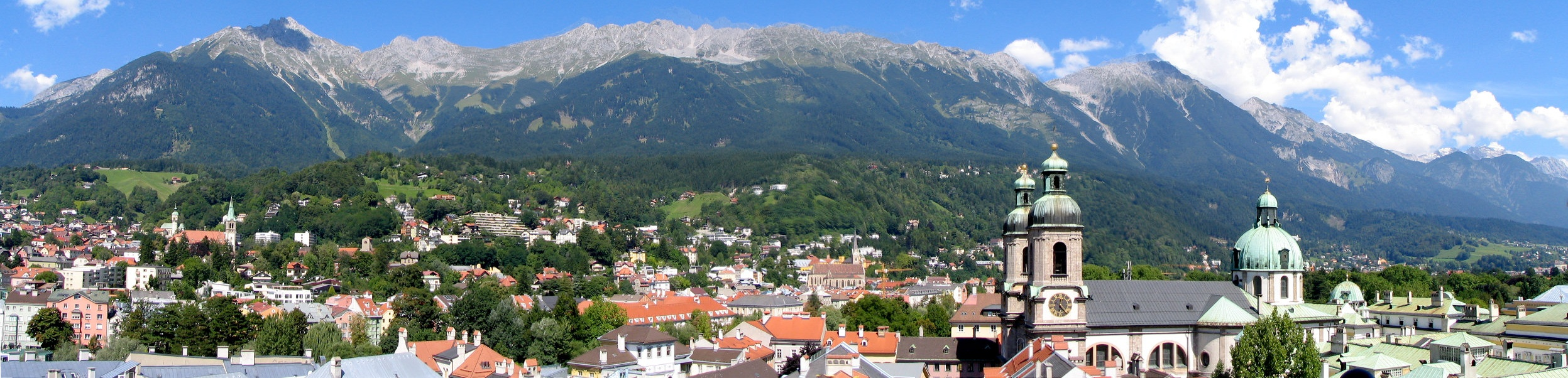
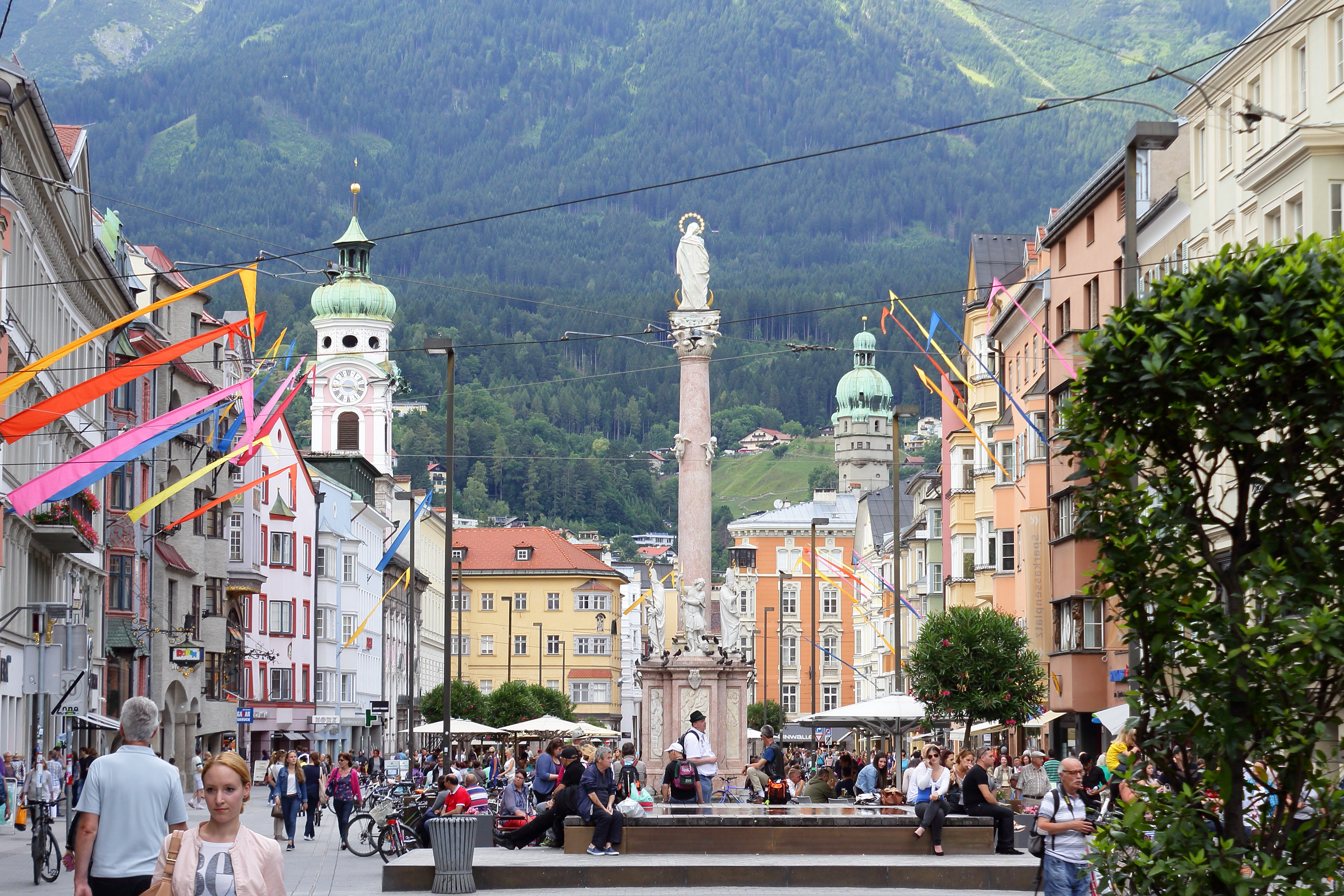
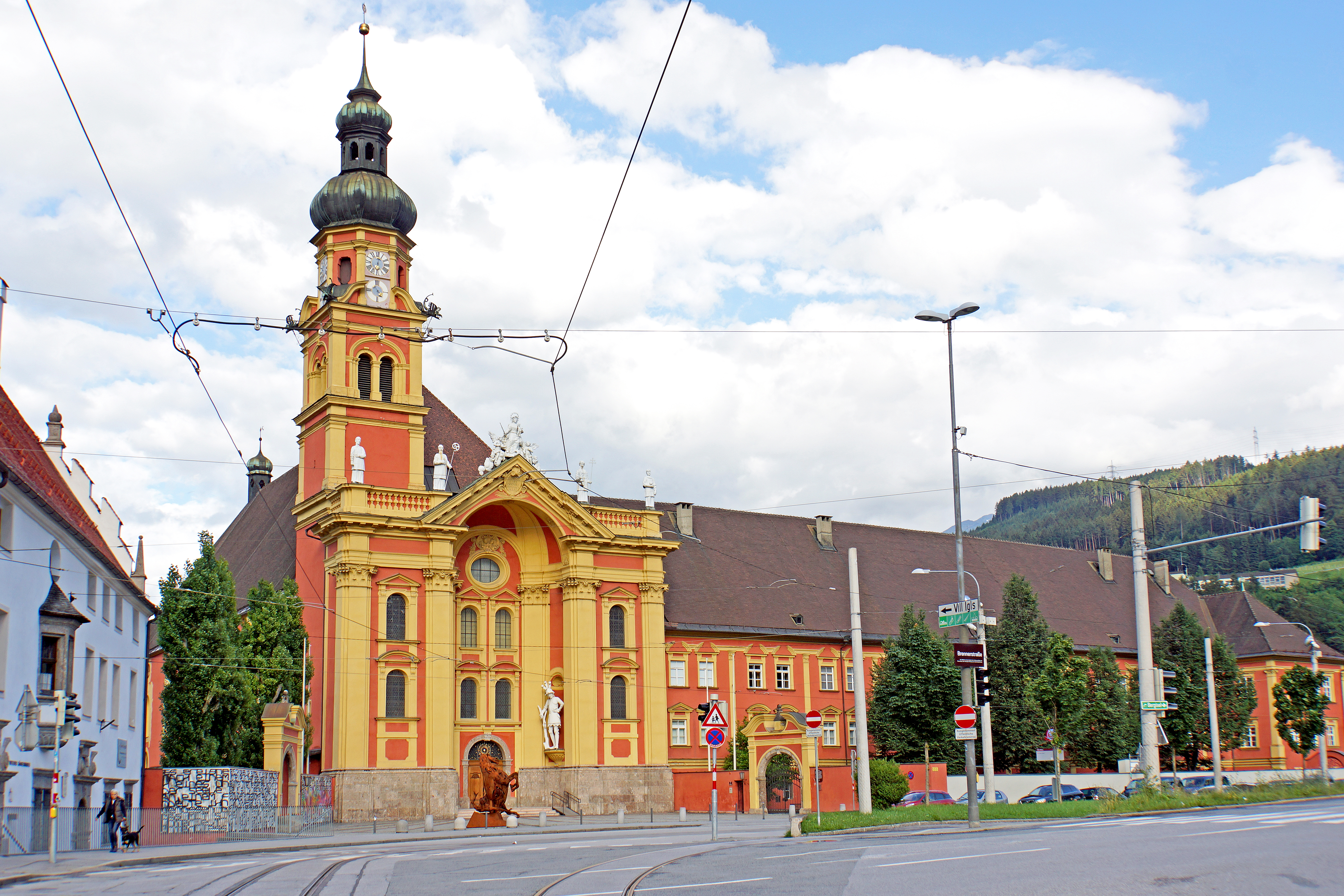
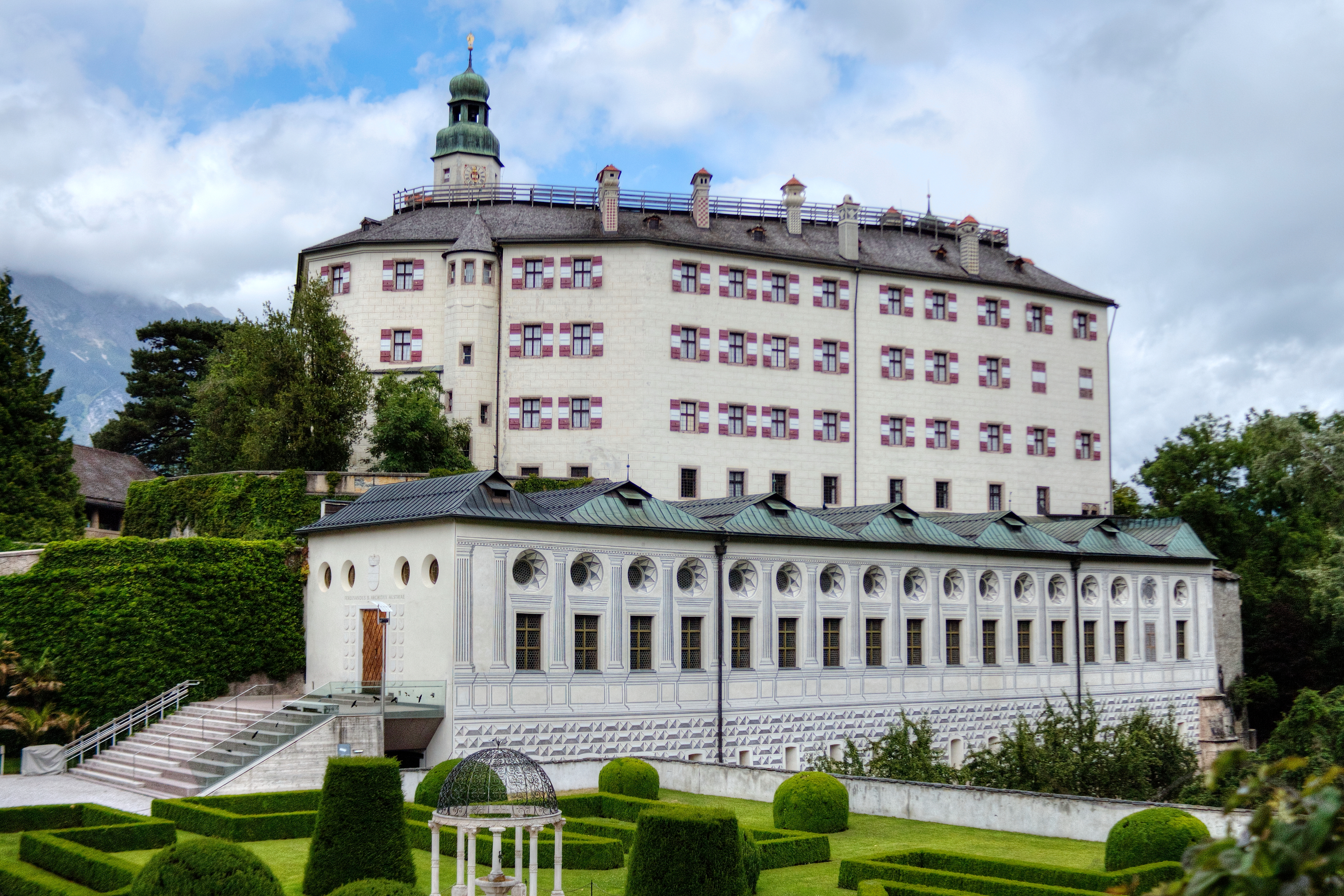
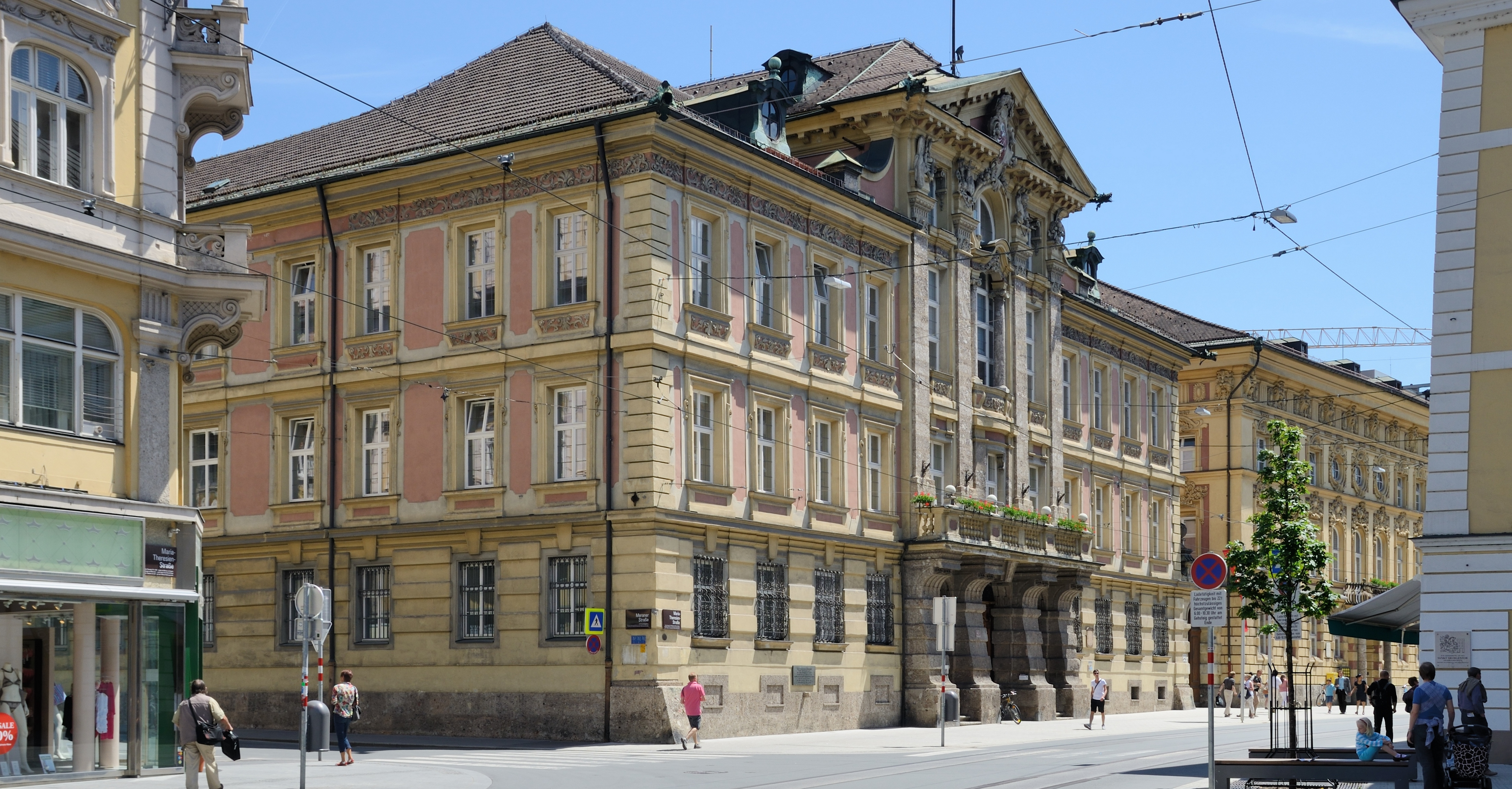
- From top, left to right: Bürgerstraße, Conradstraße, view of Innsbruck, St. Anne's Column in Maria-Theresien-Straße, Stift Wilten, Ambras Castle, Altes Landhaus

- Flag Coat of arms

- Location within Austria Innsbruck (Austria)
- Coordinates: 47°16′06″N 11°23′36″E
- Country: Austria
- State: Tyrol
- District: Statutory city

Government
  - Mayor: Johannes Anzengruber

Area
  - Statutory city: 104.91 km^{2} (40.51 sq mi)
- Elevation: 574 m (1,883 ft)

Population (2020)
  - Statutory city: 131,961
  - Density: 1,257.8/km^{2} (3,257.8/sq mi)
  - Metro: 228,583
- Demonym(s): Innsbrucker (m.); Innsbruckerin (f.) (de)
- Time zone: UTC+1 (CET)
  - Summer (DST): UTC+2 (CEST)
- Postal code: 6010–6080
- Area code: 0512
- Vehicle registration: I
- Website: innsbruck.at

Innsbruck (German: [ˈɪnsbʁʊk]; Bavarian: Innschbrugg [ˈɪnʃprʊɡ]) is the capital of the Austrian state of Tyrol and the fifth-largest city in Austria. It is located on the River Inn, at its junction with the Wipp Valley, which provides access to the Brenner Pass 30 km (19 mi) to the south. The city had a population of 132,188 in 2024.

Innsbruck originated in the Middle Ages as a strategic crossing point over the Inn River. The name means "bridge over the Inn". In 1363, Innsbruck came under Habsburg control and later became an important residence of Emperor Maximilian I, who enriched the city with landmark buildings like the Golden Roof. During the Early Modern Era, it served as a key political and cultural hub of Tyrol, also playing a role as a centre of Catholic reform. In the early 19th century, following the Treaty of Pressburg, the city was temporarily incorporated into the Kingdom of Bavaria, before returning to Austrian rule after the Congress of Vienna.

In the broad valley between high mountains, the so-called North Chain in the Karwendel Alps (Hafelekarspitze, 2,334 metres or 7,657 feet) to the north and Patscherkofel (2,246 m or 7,369 ft) and Serles (2,718 m or 8,917 ft) to the south, Innsbruck is an internationally renowned winter sports centre; it hosted the 1964 and 1976 Winter Olympics as well as the 1984 and 1988 Winter Paralympics. It also hosted the first Winter Youth Olympics in 2012 and will host the 2027 Winter Deaflympics.

== History ==
=== Antiquity ===
The earliest traces suggest initial inhabitation in the early Stone Age. Surviving pre-Roman place names show that the area has been populated continuously. In the 4th century the Romans established the army station Veldidena (the name survives in today's urban district Wilten) at Oenipons (Innsbruck), to protect the economically important commercial road from Verona-Brenner-Augsburg in their province of Raetia.

The first mention of Innsbruck dates back to the name Oeni Pontum or Oeni Pons which is Latin for bridge (pons) over the Inn (Oenus), which was an important crossing point over the Inn river. The Counts of Andechs acquired the town in 1180. In 1248, the town passed into the hands of the Counts of Tyrol. The city's arms show a bird's-eye view of the Inn bridge, a design used since 1267. The route over the Brenner Pass was then a major transport and communications link between the north and the south of Europe, and the easiest route across the Alps. It was part of the Via Imperii, a medieval imperial road under special protection of the king. The revenues generated by serving as a transit station on this route enabled the city to flourish.

=== Early history ===
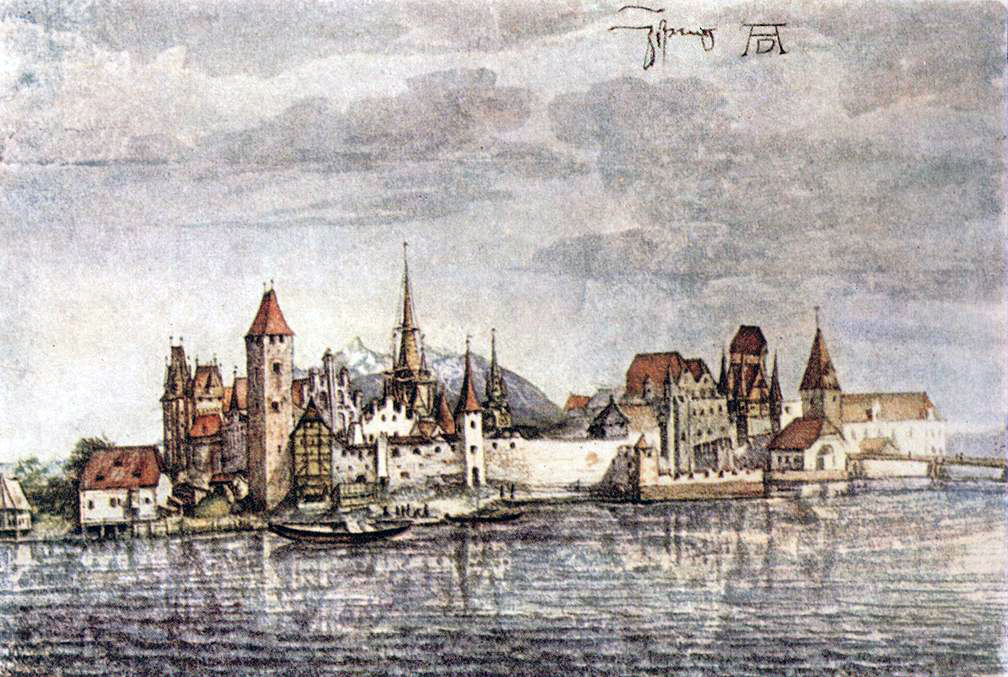
View of Innsbruck by Albrecht Dürer, 1495 (from the north)

Innsbruck became the capital of all Tyrol in 1429 and in the 15th century the city became a centre of European politics and culture as Emperor Maximilian I also resided in Innsbruck in the 1490s. The city benefited from the emperor's presence as can be seen for example in the Hofkirche. Here a funeral monument for Maximilian was planned and erected partly by his successors. The ensemble with a cenotaph and the bronze statues of real and mythical ancestors of the Habsburg emperor are one of the main artistic monuments of Innsbruck. A regular postal service between Innsbruck and Mechelen was established in 1490 by the Thurn-und-Taxis-Post.

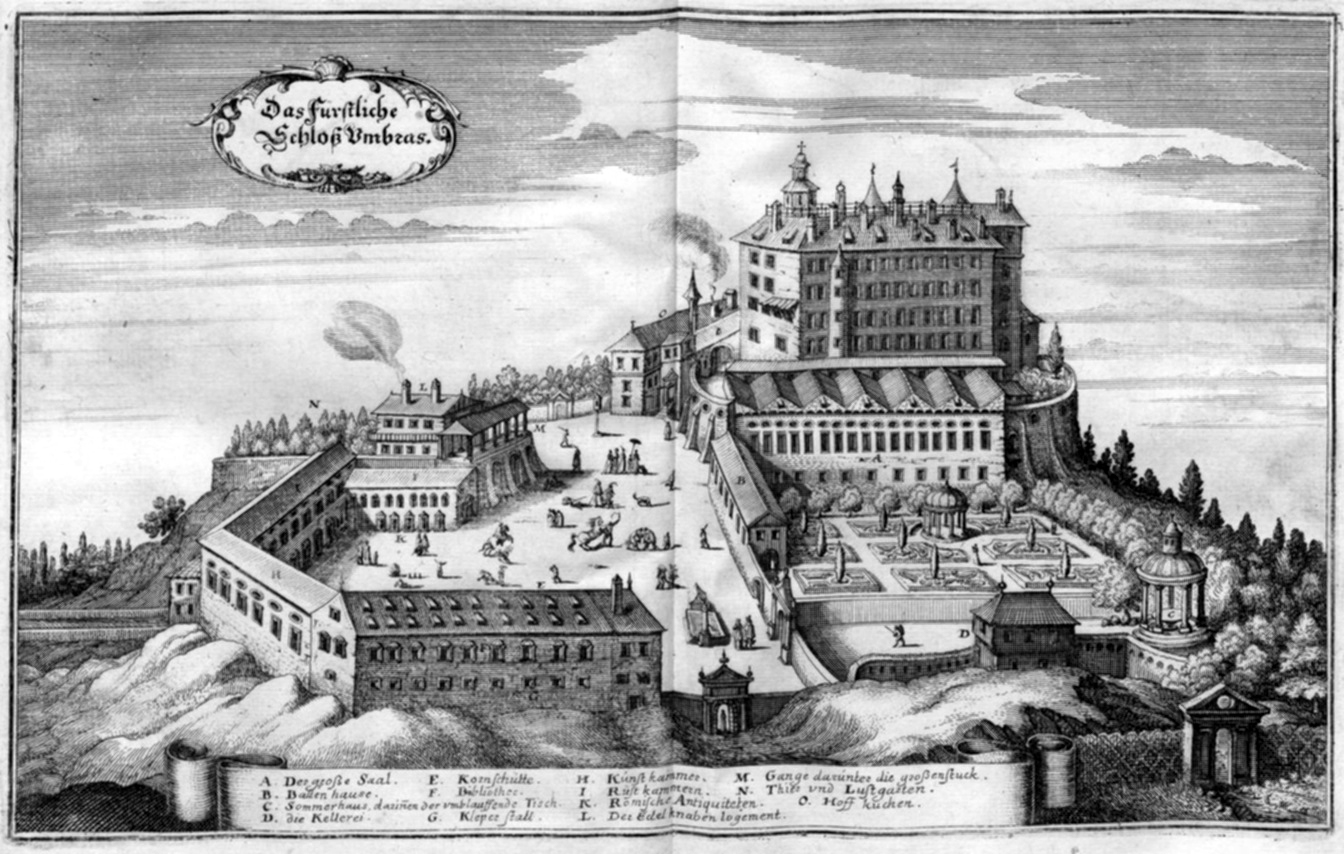
Ambras Castle, 1679

In 1564, Ferdinand II, Archduke of Austria received the rulership over Tyrol and other Further Austrian possessions administered from Innsbruck up to the 18th century. He had Schloss Ambras built and arranged there his unique Renaissance collections nowadays mainly part of Vienna's Kunsthistorisches Museum. Up to 1665 a stirps of the Habsburg dynasty ruled in Innsbruck with an independent court. In the 1620s, the first opera house north of the Alps was erected in Innsbruck (Dogana).

The university was founded in 1669. Also as a compensation for the court as Emperor Leopold I again reigned from Vienna and the Tyrolean stirps of the Habsburg dynasty had ended in 1665.

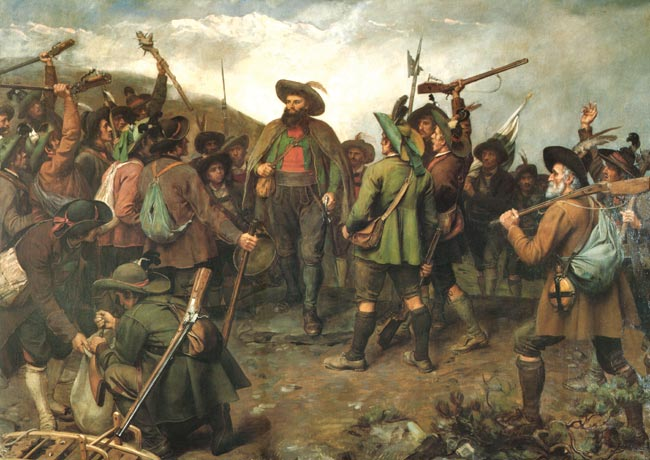
Victory of Andreas Hofer at Bergisel, by Franz Defregger

During the Napoleonic Wars Tyrol was ceded to Bavaria, ally of France. Andreas Hofer led a Tyrolean peasant army to victory in the Battles of Bergisel against the combined Bavarian and French forces, and then made Innsbruck the centre of his administration. The combined army later overran the Tyrolean militia army, Hofer was fusilladed for his role and became a martyr for the locals, his remains were returned to Innsbruck in 1823 and interred in the Franciscan church.

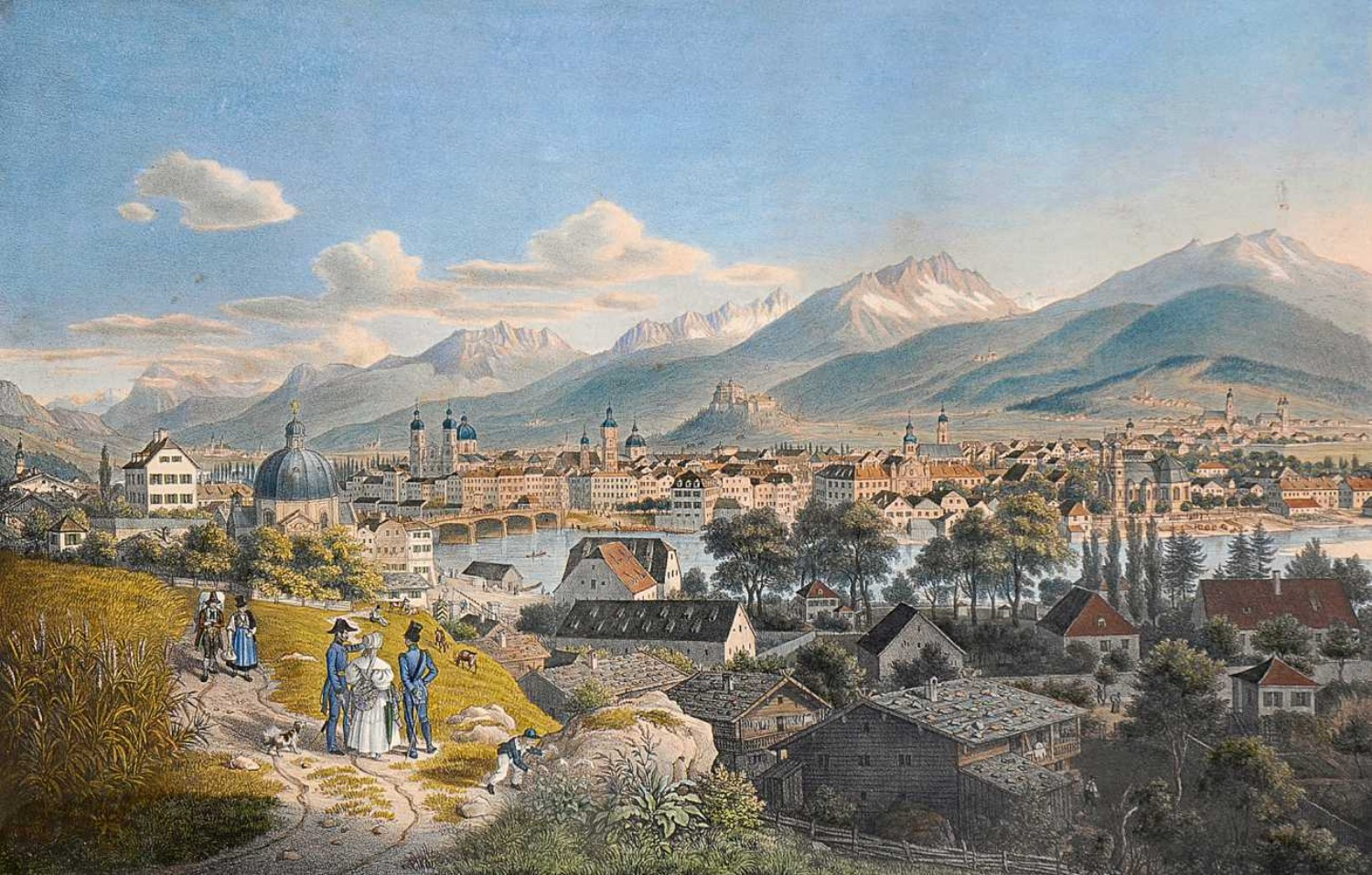
View of Innsbruck in the 19th century

Afterwards, until 1814 Innsbruck was part of Bavaria. The Vienna Congress restored the Austrian rule over the city. Innsbruck played a part during the revolution of 1848 in Austria. In May of that year, riots in Vienna made Emperor Ferdinand to move the seat of government temporarily to the city. It remained part of the Austrian monarchy (Austria side after the compromise of 1867) as one of the 4 autonomous towns in Tyrol, the centre of the identically named district, one of the 21 Bezirkshauptmannschaften.

During World War I, the only recorded action taking place in Innsbruck was near the end of the war. On 20 February 1918, Allied planes flying out of Italy raided Innsbruck, causing casualties among the Austrian troops there. No damage to the town is recorded. In November 1918, Innsbruck and all Tyrol were occupied by the 20 to 22 thousand soldiers of the III Corps of the First Italian Army.

In 1929, the first official Austrian Chess Championship was held in Innsbruck.

=== Annexation and World War II ===
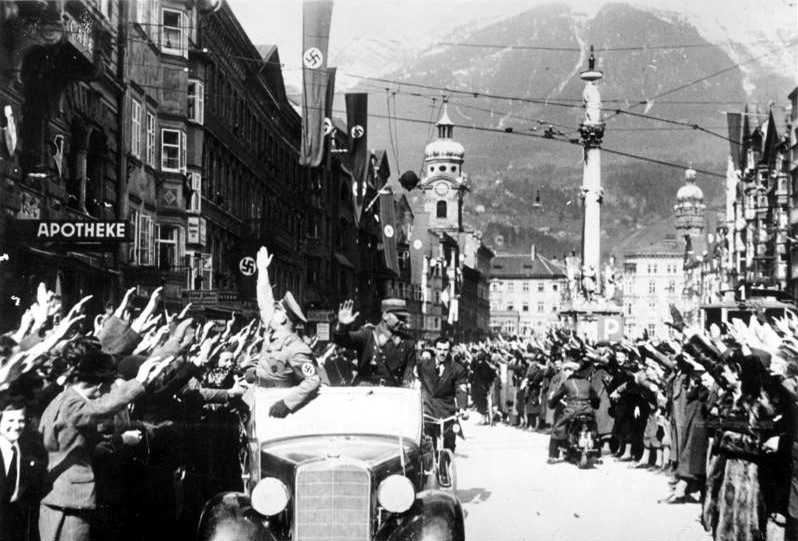
Some residents of Innsbruck welcomed the German troops after the Anschluss on 13 March 1938.

In 1938, Austria was annexed by Nazi Germany in the Anschluss. During World War II, Innsbruck was the location of two subcamps of the Dachau concentration camp, including a special camp for prominent people from 16 countries and their families, who were held as hostages, including former Prime Minister of France Léon Blum, former regent of Hungary Miklós Horthy, former Chancellor of Austria Kurt Schuschnigg, Italian general Giuseppe Garibaldi II and a nephew of Winston Churchill. Between 1943 and April 1945, Innsbruck experienced twenty-two air raids and suffered heavy damage.

=== Euroregion Tyrol-South Tyrol-Trentino ===
In 1996, the European Union approved further cultural and economic integration between the Austrian province of Tyrol and the Italian autonomous provinces of South Tyrol and Trentino by recognising the creation of the Euroregion Tyrol-South Tyrol-Trentino.

== Geography ==
=== Climate ===
Innsbruck has a humid continental climate (Köppen Dfb) since it has at least one month with a mean temperature below 0°C (32°F). Innsbruck has a larger annual temperature differences than most of Central Europe due to its location in the centre of the Continent and its position around mountainous terrains. Winters are often cold or very cold (colder than those of all major Western European cities, as well as most Central European cities) and snowy, although the foehn wind sometimes brings pronounced thaws, despite the warming effect not being as extreme as is common in Salzburg. Spring is brief; days start to get warm, often over 15 °C (59 °F), but nights remain cool or even freezing.

Summer is highly variable and unpredictable. Days can be cool 17 °C (63 °F) and rainy, or sunny and extremely hot, sometimes hitting 34 °C (93 °F). In summer, as expected for an alpine-influenced climate, the diurnal temperature variation is often very high as nights usually remain cool, being 12 °C (54 °F) on average, but sometimes dipping as low as 6 °C (43 °F).

The average annual temperature is 10 °C (50 °F).

Climate data for Innsbruck-Flugplatz (1991–2020)
Month	Jan	Feb	Mar	Apr	May	Jun	Jul	Aug	Sep	Oct	Nov	Dec	Year
Record high °C (°F)	20.3 (68.5)	20.6 (69.1)	24.3 (75.7)	28.8 (83.8)	32.3 (90.1)	37.2 (99.0)	37.0 (98.6)	36.5 (97.7)	31.5 (88.7)	25.9 (78.6)	21.7 (71.1)	16.1 (61.0)	37.2 (99.0)
Mean daily maximum °C (°F)	3.9 (39.0)	7.2 (45.0)	11.7 (53.1)	16.5 (61.7)	20.2 (68.4)	24.0 (75.2)	24.7 (76.5)	24.3 (75.7)	20.6 (69.1)	15.5 (59.9)	9.3 (48.7)	4.1 (39.4)	15.2 (59.3)
Daily mean °C (°F)	−0.4 (31.3)	1.6 (34.9)	6.2 (43.2)	10.3 (50.5)	14.7 (58.5)	18.0 (64.4)	19.5 (67.1)	19.2 (66.6)	15.1 (59.2)	10.7 (51.3)	4.8 (40.6)	0.3 (32.5)	10.0 (50.0)
Mean daily minimum °C (°F)	−4.5 (23.9)	−3.6 (25.5)	0.4 (32.7)	4.2 (39.6)	8.2 (46.8)	12.0 (53.6)	13.1 (55.6)	13.0 (55.4)	9.6 (49.3)	5.2 (41.4)	0.5 (32.9)	−3.4 (25.9)	4.6 (40.2)
Record low °C (°F)	−17.4 (0.7)	−18.4 (−1.1)	−16.5 (2.3)	−9.6 (14.7)	−1.0 (30.2)	3.0 (37.4)	6.0 (42.8)	1.9 (35.4)	−0.9 (30.4)	−6.6 (20.1)	−11.7 (10.9)	−18.3 (−0.9)	−18.4 (−1.1)
Average precipitation mm (inches)	46.6 (1.83)	36.8 (1.45)	54.1 (2.13)	54.5 (2.15)	85.9 (3.38)	114.2 (4.50)	121.4 (4.78)	134.9 (5.31)	83.0 (3.27)	67.9 (2.67)	59.1 (2.33)	54.8 (2.16)	913.2 (35.96)
Average precipitation days (≥ 1.0 mm)	7.9	7.4	8.5	8.9	11.6	13.2	13.6	13	9.5	8.5	8.1	8.5	118.7
Source: NOAA NCEI

Climate data for Innsbruck University (1981–2010, extremes 1777–present)
Month	Jan	Feb	Mar	Apr	May	Jun	Jul	Aug	Sep	Oct	Nov	Dec	Year
Record high °C (°F)	19.8 (67.6)	20.6 (69.1)	24.8 (76.6)	28.7 (83.7)	33.7 (92.7)	37.3 (99.1)	37.4 (99.3)	37.4 (99.3)	32.4 (90.3)	26.0 (78.8)	23.0 (73.4)	17.9 (64.2)	37.4 (99.3)
Mean daily maximum °C (°F)	3.6 (38.5)	6.4 (43.5)	11.8 (53.2)	16.3 (61.3)	21.4 (70.5)	23.8 (74.8)	26.0 (78.8)	25.1 (77.2)	20.8 (69.4)	16.0 (60.8)	8.6 (47.5)	3.8 (38.8)	15.3 (59.5)
Daily mean °C (°F)	−1.0 (30.2)	0.8 (33.4)	5.4 (41.7)	9.6 (49.3)	14.6 (58.3)	17.2 (63.0)	19.2 (66.6)	18.4 (65.1)	14.4 (57.9)	9.9 (49.8)	3.9 (39.0)	−0.1 (31.8)	9.4 (48.9)
Mean daily minimum °C (°F)	−4.0 (24.8)	−2.8 (27.0)	1.0 (33.8)	4.7 (40.5)	9.1 (48.4)	12.0 (53.6)	13.9 (57.0)	13.6 (56.5)	10.2 (50.4)	6.1 (43.0)	1.0 (33.8)	−2.7 (27.1)	5.2 (41.4)
Record low °C (°F)	−26.6 (−15.9)	−26.9 (−16.4)	−16.9 (1.6)	−7.0 (19.4)	−2.4 (27.7)	0.6 (33.1)	2.0 (35.6)	3.3 (37.9)	−1.0 (30.2)	−9.0 (15.8)	−15.2 (4.6)	−31.3 (−24.3)	−31.3 (−24.3)
Average precipitation mm (inches)	42 (1.7)	41 (1.6)	57 (2.2)	58 (2.3)	84 (3.3)	115 (4.5)	136 (5.4)	130 (5.1)	80 (3.1)	59 (2.3)	60 (2.4)	51 (2.0)	911 (35.9)
Average snowfall cm (inches)	25 (9.8)	28 (11)	12 (4.7)	3 (1.2)	0 (0)	0 (0)	0 (0)	0 (0)	0 (0)	0 (0)	11 (4.3)	21 (8.3)	99 (39)
Average relative humidity (%) (at 14:00)	60.8	52.9	46.1	43.1	43.7	46.6	46.8	49.7	50.6	52.3	60.8	60.8	51.7
Mean monthly sunshine hours	100	123	165	183	206	198	231	212	183	163	101	83	1,949
Percentage possible sunshine	37.0	50.4	49.9	48.1	49.2	45.8	53.8	52.7	53.8	55.9	46.7	34.5	44.5
Source 1: Central Institute for Meteorology and Geodynamics
Source 2: Meteo Climat (record highs and lows)

Climate data for Innsbruck-Flugplatz (LOWI) 1971–2000
Month	Jan	Feb	Mar	Apr	May	Jun	Jul	Aug	Sep	Oct	Nov	Dec	Year
Record high °C (°F)	20.2 (68.4)	21.3 (70.3)	23.9 (75.0)	26.4 (79.5)	32.2 (90.0)	33.6 (92.5)	37.7 (99.9)	35.0 (95.0)	32.1 (89.8)	26.0 (78.8)	21.2 (70.2)	17.1 (62.8)	37.7 (99.9)
Mean daily maximum °C (°F)	3.5 (38.3)	6.3 (43.3)	11.3 (52.3)	14.8 (58.6)	20.3 (68.5)	22.6 (72.7)	24.7 (76.5)	24.4 (75.9)	20.8 (69.4)	15.8 (60.4)	8.2 (46.8)	3.7 (38.7)	14.7 (58.5)
Daily mean °C (°F)	−1.7 (28.9)	0.4 (32.7)	4.8 (40.6)	8.4 (47.1)	13.4 (56.1)	16.1 (61.0)	18.1 (64.6)	17.7 (63.9)	14.0 (57.2)	9.1 (48.4)	2.9 (37.2)	−1.0 (30.2)	8.5 (47.3)
Mean daily minimum °C (°F)	−5.2 (22.6)	−3.7 (25.3)	0.2 (32.4)	3.4 (38.1)	7.8 (46.0)	10.8 (51.4)	12.8 (55.0)	12.7 (54.9)	9.3 (48.7)	4.8 (40.6)	−0.5 (31.1)	−4.2 (24.4)	4.0 (39.2)
Record low °C (°F)	−23.8 (−10.8)	−17.3 (0.9)	−16.5 (2.3)	−4.8 (23.4)	−2.3 (27.9)	3.0 (37.4)	4.4 (39.9)	1.9 (35.4)	−0.9 (30.4)	−6.6 (20.1)	−17.9 (−0.2)	−20.1 (−4.2)	−23.8 (−10.8)
Average precipitation mm (inches)	43.9 (1.73)	41.4 (1.63)	55.9 (2.20)	57.7 (2.27)	87.1 (3.43)	110.3 (4.34)	137.2 (5.40)	111.3 (4.38)	78.1 (3.07)	57.3 (2.26)	63.2 (2.49)	53.1 (2.09)	896.5 (35.30)
Average snowfall cm (inches)	25.6 (10.1)	30.0 (11.8)	12.5 (4.9)	3.5 (1.4)	0.0 (0.0)	0.0 (0.0)	0.0 (0.0)	0.0 (0.0)	0.0 (0.0)	0.8 (0.3)	12.0 (4.7)	25.9 (10.2)	110.3 (43.4)
Average precipitation days (≥ 1.0 mm)	7.4	7.3	8.8	9.7	10.7	13.2	13.9	12.6	9.2	7.8	9.0	8.6	118.2
Average relative humidity (%) (at 14:00)	64.0	54.2	45.2	44.2	42.6	46.7	47.5	49.0	49.2	50.9	61.2	69.5	52.0
Source: Central Institute for Meteorology and Geodynamics

Climate data for Innsbruck University (1971–2000)
Month	Jan	Feb	Mar	Apr	May	Jun	Jul	Aug	Sep	Oct	Nov	Dec	Year
Record high °C (°F)	19.8 (67.6)	19.1 (66.4)	24.8 (76.6)	27.1 (80.8)	32.3 (90.1)	34.1 (93.4)	37.4 (99.3)	35.5 (95.9)	31.6 (88.9)	25.8 (78.4)	20.9 (69.6)	16.9 (62.4)	37.4 (99.3)
Mean daily maximum °C (°F)	3.7 (38.7)	6.5 (43.7)	11.5 (52.7)	15.2 (59.4)	20.5 (68.9)	22.8 (73.0)	24.9 (76.8)	24.5 (76.1)	20.8 (69.4)	15.7 (60.3)	8.1 (46.6)	3.8 (38.8)	14.8 (58.6)
Daily mean °C (°F)	−0.9 (30.4)	0.9 (33.6)	5.2 (41.4)	8.7 (47.7)	13.7 (56.7)	16.3 (61.3)	18.3 (64.9)	17.9 (64.2)	14.2 (57.6)	9.4 (48.9)	3.3 (37.9)	−0.3 (31.5)	8.9 (48.0)
Mean daily minimum °C (°F)	−3.9 (25.0)	−2.6 (27.3)	1.0 (33.8)	4.1 (39.4)	8.5 (47.3)	11.4 (52.5)	13.3 (55.9)	13.2 (55.8)	9.9 (49.8)	5.5 (41.9)	0.4 (32.7)	−2.9 (26.8)	4.8 (40.6)
Record low °C (°F)	−21.1 (−6.0)	−14.5 (5.9)	−15.0 (5.0)	−4.0 (24.8)	−2.4 (27.7)	3.5 (38.3)	4.4 (39.9)	4.7 (40.5)	−0.3 (31.5)	−5.9 (21.4)	−14.5 (5.9)	−17.2 (1.0)	−21.1 (−6.0)
Average precipitation mm (inches)	42.5 (1.67)	36.8 (1.45)	53.8 (2.12)	58.8 (2.31)	83.2 (3.28)	111.8 (4.40)	134.3 (5.29)	116.5 (4.59)	78.1 (3.07)	56.1 (2.21)	62.4 (2.46)	48.8 (1.92)	883.1 (34.77)
Average snowfall cm (inches)	21.8 (8.6)	28.4 (11.2)	12.6 (5.0)	4.1 (1.6)	0.0 (0.0)	0.0 (0.0)	0.0 (0.0)	0.0 (0.0)	0.0 (0.0)	1.7 (0.7)	10.8 (4.3)	15.9 (6.3)	95.3 (37.5)
Average precipitation days (≥ 1.0 mm)	7.6	6.9	8.7	9.4	10.7	13.6	13.7	12.5	9.1	7.6	8.7	8.5	117.0
Average relative humidity (%) (at 14:00)	61.0	53.0	45.4	43.9	43.5	47.3	47.8	49.2	50.4	51.8	60.5	66.7	51.7
Mean monthly sunshine hours	94.7	121.1	154.2	168.2	193.0	186.8	215.5	214.4	180.0	159.0	102.2	82.8	1,871.9
Percentage possible sunshine	39.1	48.8	45.3	43.3	45.9	43.8	50.1	52.6	54.6	53.3	46.5	43.8	47.4
Source: Central Institute for Meteorology and Geodynamics

=== Boroughs and statistical divisions ===
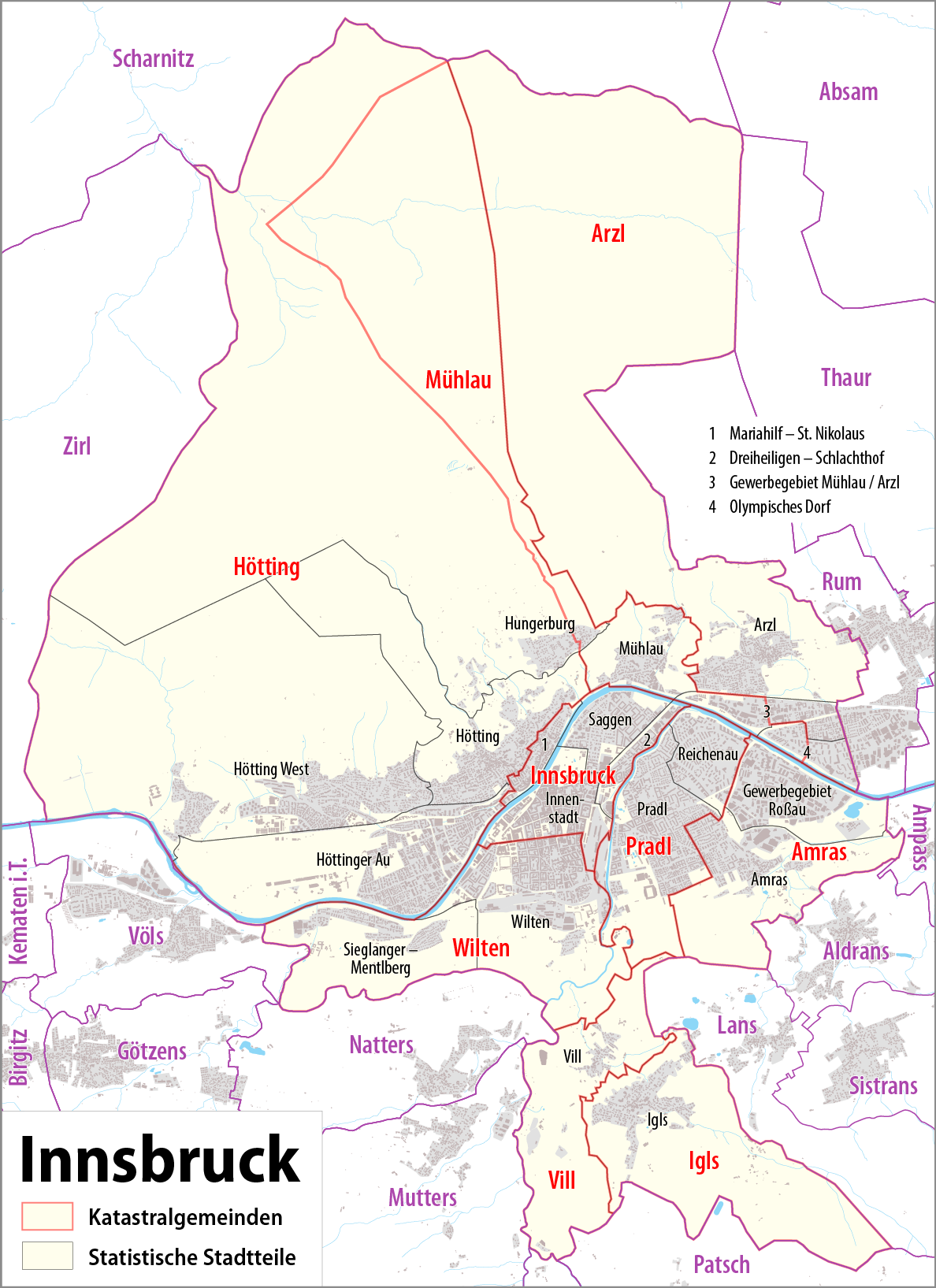
Cadastral settlements (red) and wards (grey) of Innsbruck

Innsbruck is divided into nine boroughs (cadastral settlements) that were formed from previously independent municipalities or villages. These nine boroughs are further divided into twenty wards (cadastral districts). All wards are within one borough, except for the ward of Hungerburg (Upper Innsbruck), which is divided between two. For statistical purposes, Innsbruck is further divided into forty-two statistical units (Statistischer Bezirk) and 178 numbered blocks (Zählsprengel).

The nine boroughs of Innsbruck and their population as of 2024:

- Amras (5,610) (consisting of Roßau)
- Arzl (11,281) (consisting of Neuarzl and the Olympic Village)
- Hötting (34,958) (consisting of Allerheiligen, parts of Hungerburg, Höttinger Au, Hötting West, Kranebitten, Sadrach)
- Igls (2,631)
- Innsbruck - inner city (20,250) (consisting of Dreiheiligen-Schlachthof, Oldtown, Saggen)
- Mühlau (5,655) (consisting of parts of Hungerburg)
- Pradl (33,554) (consisting of Pradler-Saggen, Reichenau, Tivoli)
- Vill (525)
- Wilten (17,724) (consisting of Mentlberg, Sieglanger, Wilten West)

=== Architecture ===
Innsbruck's architectural development was shaped by its origins as a medieval trading hub, its being residence of Habsburg rulers, and its modern evolution to an Alpine city. The city contains buildings representing Gothic, Renaissance, Baroque, and contemporary architectural styles.

==== Historical architecture ====
The Golden Roof (Goldenes Dachl), completed around 1500 during the reign of Emperor Maximilian I, is one of the city's most recognizable landmarks.

==== Modern and contemporary architecture ====
Innsbruck is also home to several modern-day architectural projects. The Bergisel Ski Jump, designed by architect Zaha Hadid, was completed in 2002.

Hadid also designed the four stations of the Hungerburgbahn funicular, which opened in 2007. Their curved glass roofs came from the inspiration of natural ice formations.

=== Places of interest ===
Impressions of the city of Innsbruck

==== Mountains ====
- Nordkette
- Patscherkofel

==== Buildings and monuments ====
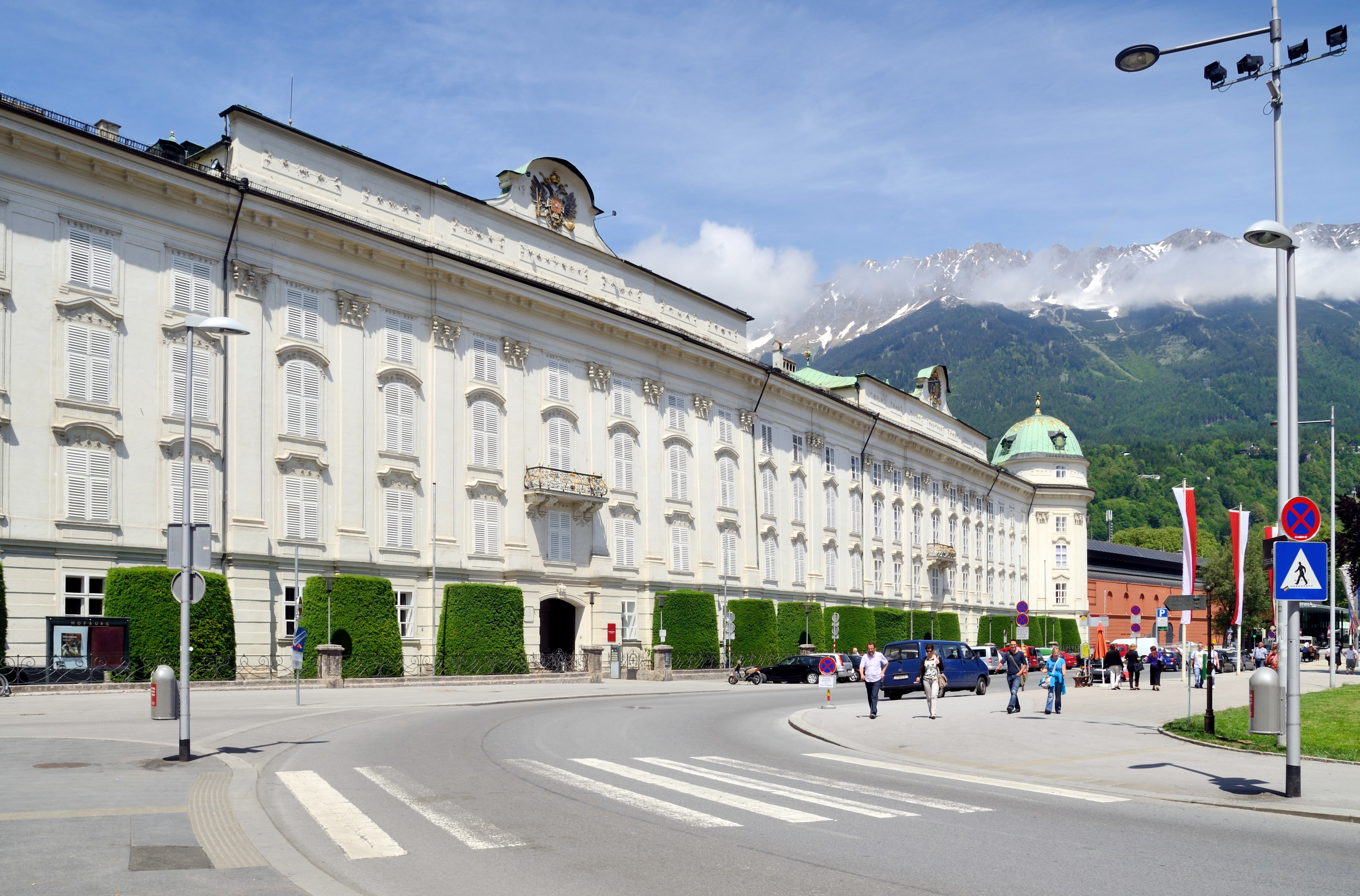
Imperial Hofburg (Kaiserliche Hofburg)

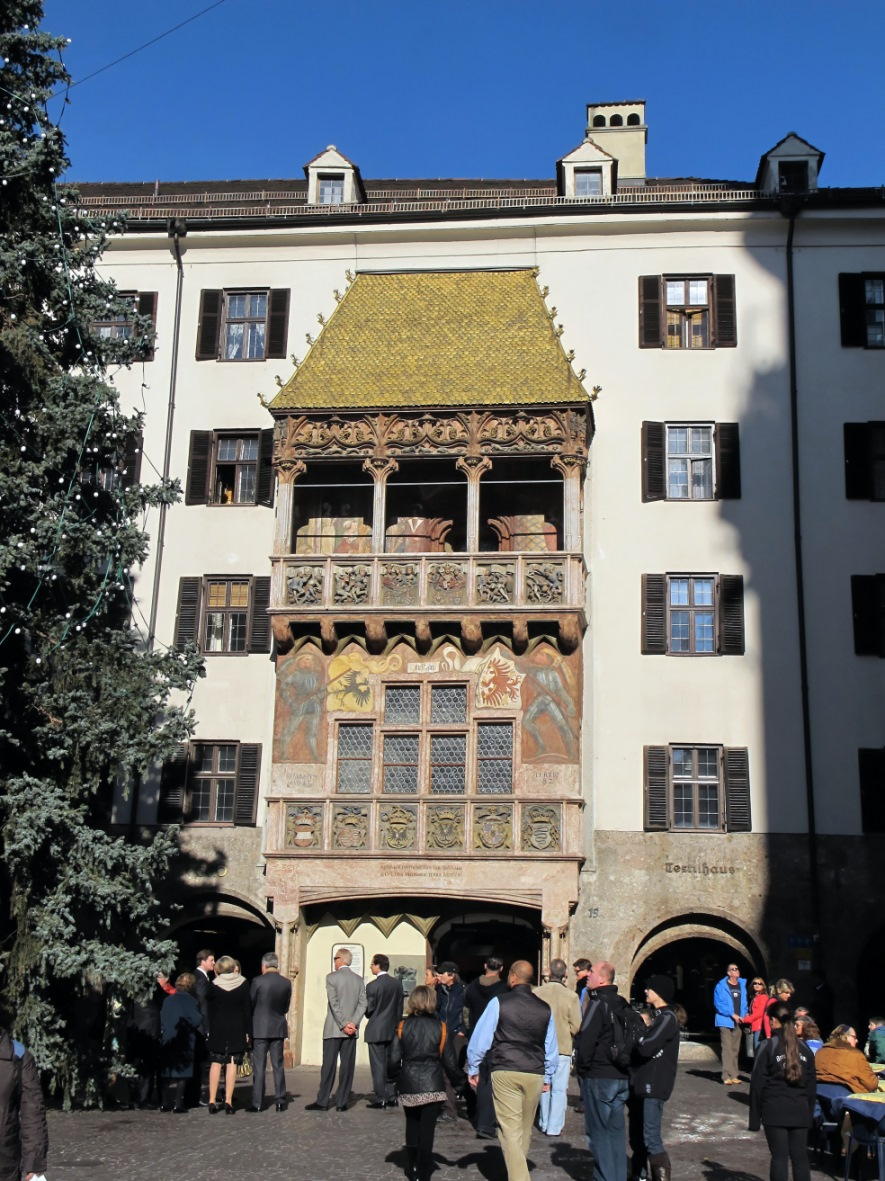
Goldenes Dachl (Golden Roof)

- Old Inn Bridge (Alte Innbrücke)
- Ambras Castle
- Andreas Hofer's tomb
- St. Anne's Column (Annasäule)
- Bergisel Ski Jump
- Büchsenhausen Castle
- Canisianum
- Casino
- City Hall (Stadtsaal)
- Golden Roof (Goldenes Dachl)
- Helbling House (Helblinghaus)
- Imperial Palace (Hofburg)
- Hungerburgbahn
- Leopold Fountain (Leopoldsbrunnen)
- Maria-Theresien-Straße
- Maximilian's Cenotaph and the Black Men (Schwarzen Männer)
- Old Federal State Parliament (Altes Landhaus)
- Old Town (Altstadt)
- Silver Chapel (Silberne Kapelle)
- City Tower (Stadtturm)
- Triumphal Arch (Triumphpforte)
- Tyrolean State Theatre

==== Museums ====
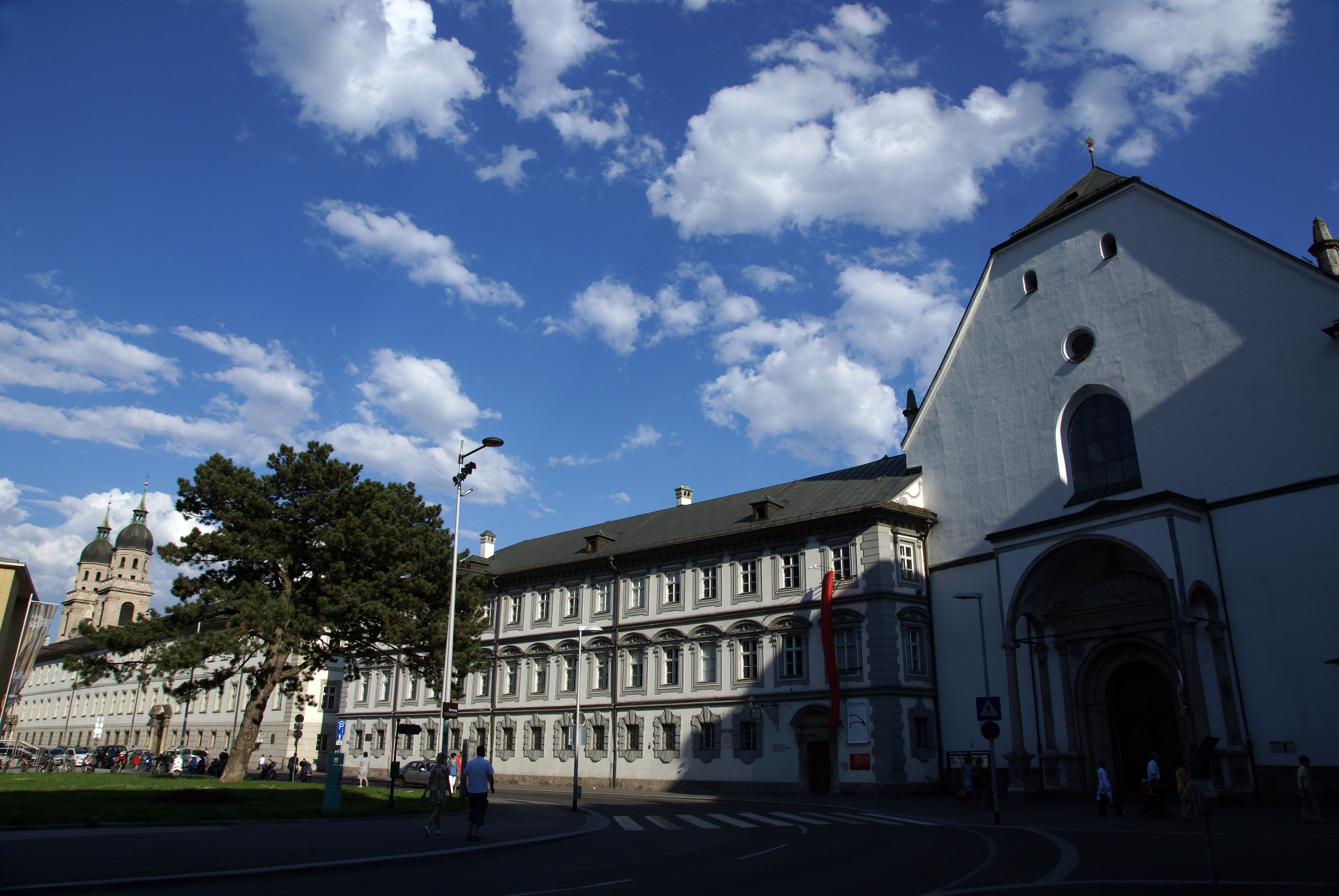
Tyrolean Folk Art Museum next to the Hofkirche in Innsbruck

- Alpine Club Museum
- Ambras Castle
- Armoury
- City Archives
- Grassmayr Bell Foundry and Museum
- Innsbruck Stubaital station
- Kaiserjäger Museum
- Tyrol Panorama Museum (Das Tirol Panorama)
- Tyrolean Folk Art Museum (Tiroler Volkunstmuseum)
- Tyrolean State Museum (Tiroler Landesmuseum or Ferdinandeum)
- Tyrolean Museum Railways (Tiroler Museumsbahnen)

==== Churches ====
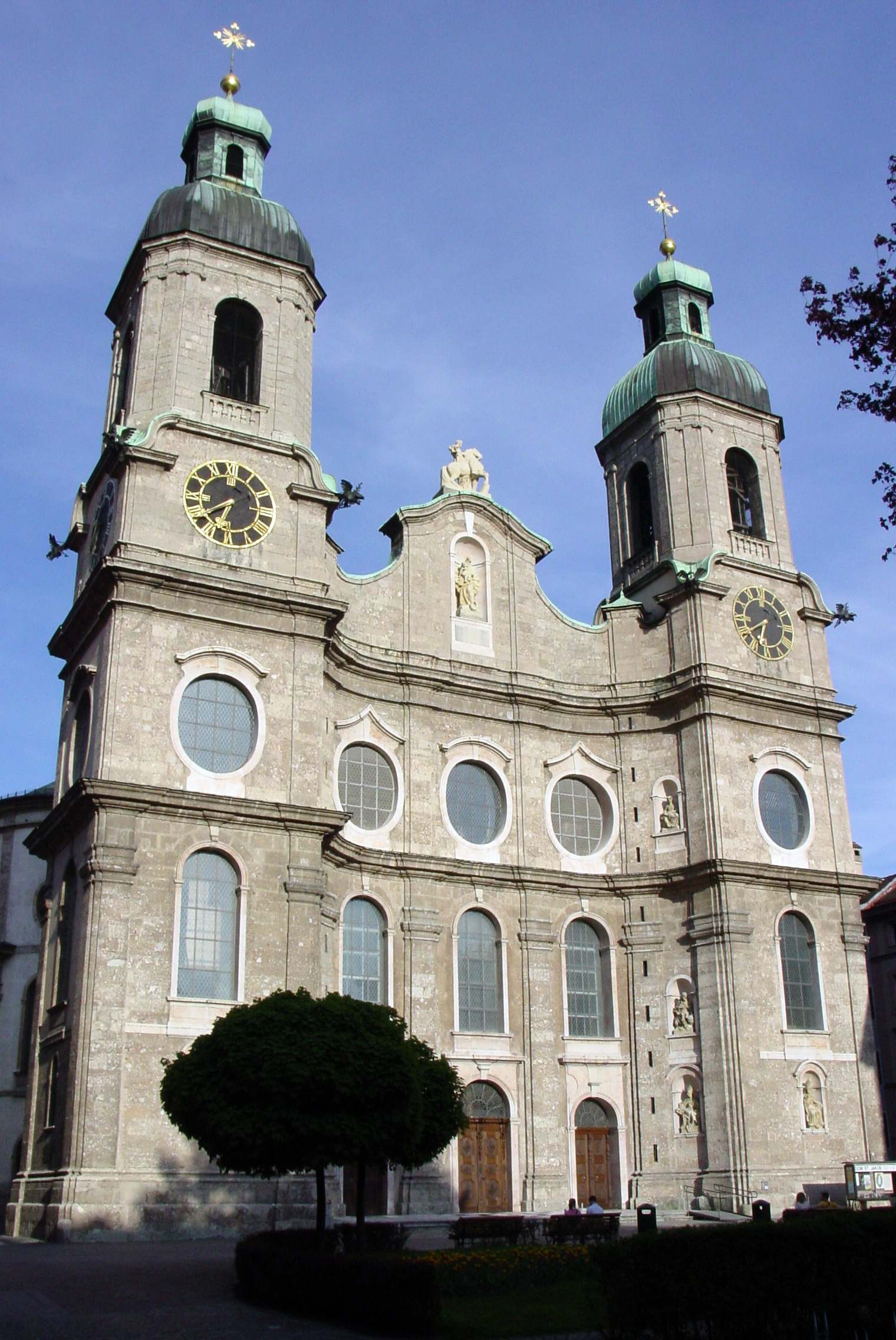
Innsbruck Cathedral (Dom zu St. Jakob)

- Court Church (Hofkirche)
- Innsbruck Cathedral (Dom zu St. Jakob)
- Old Ursuline Church
- Jesuit Church
- Church of Our Lady
- Church of Our Lady of Perpectual Succour
- Servite Church
- Hospital Church
- Ursuline Church
- Wilten Abbey (Stift Wilten)
- Wilten Basilica (Wiltener Basilika)
- Holy Trinity Church
- St. John's Church
- St. Theresa's Church (Hungerburg)
- Pradler Parish Church
- St. Paul's State Memorial Church in the Reichenau
- Evangelical Church of Christ
- Evangelical Church of the Resurrection
- Old Höttingen Parish Church
- Höttingen Parish Church
- Parish Church of St. Nicholas
- Parish Church of Neu-Arzl
- Parish Church of St. Norbert
- Parish Church of Maria am Gestade
- Parish Church of the Good Shepherd
- Parish Church of St. George
- Parish Church of St. Paul
- Parish Church of St. Pirminius
- Church of the Guardian Angel

==== Parks and gardens ====
- Alpine Zoo (Alpenzoo)
- Baggersee Innsbruck
- Innsbruck University Botanic Garden
- Hofgarten (Court Garden)
- Rapoldi-Weiher Park
- Ambras Castle Park (Schlosspark Ambras)

=== Gallery ===
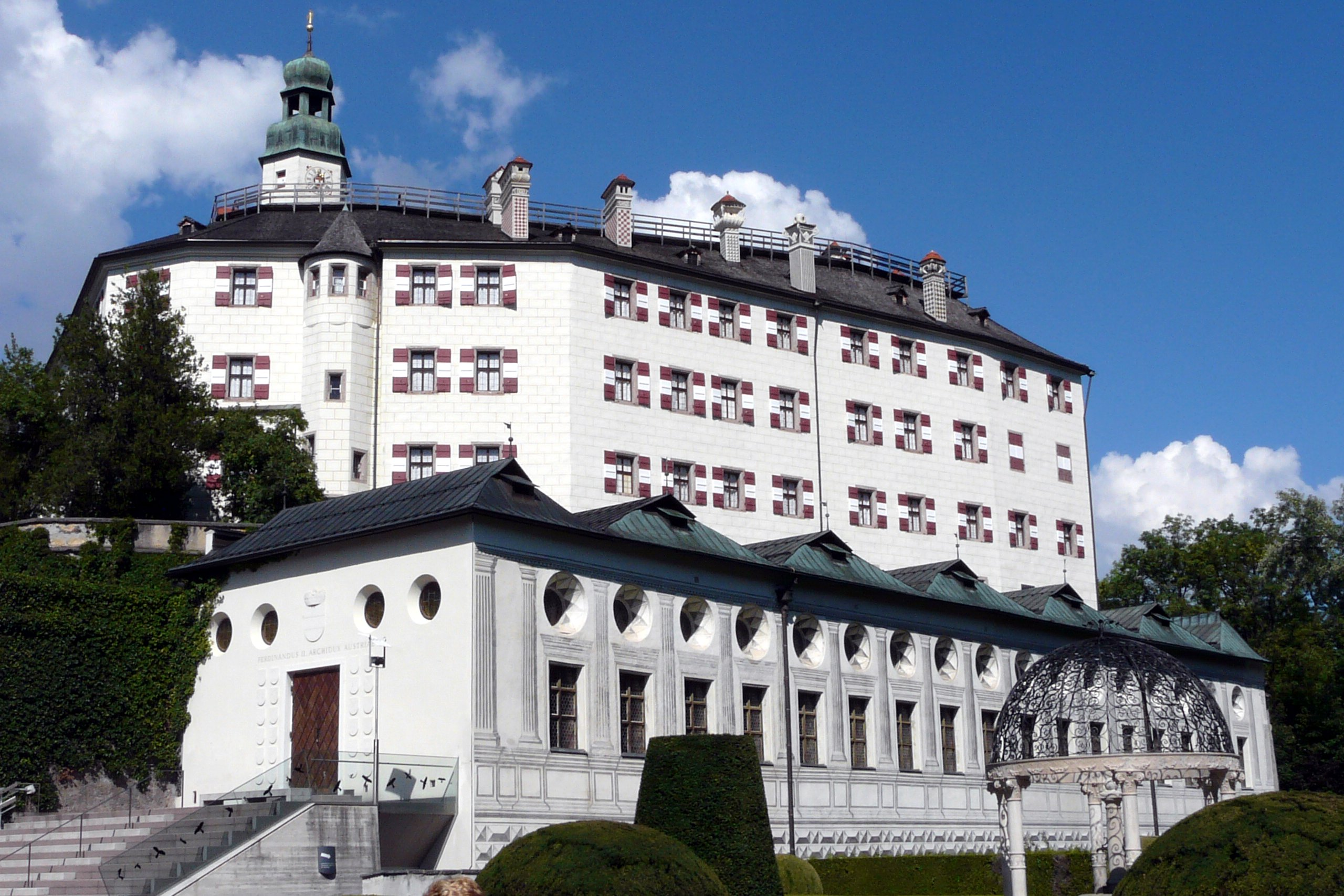
Ambras Castle

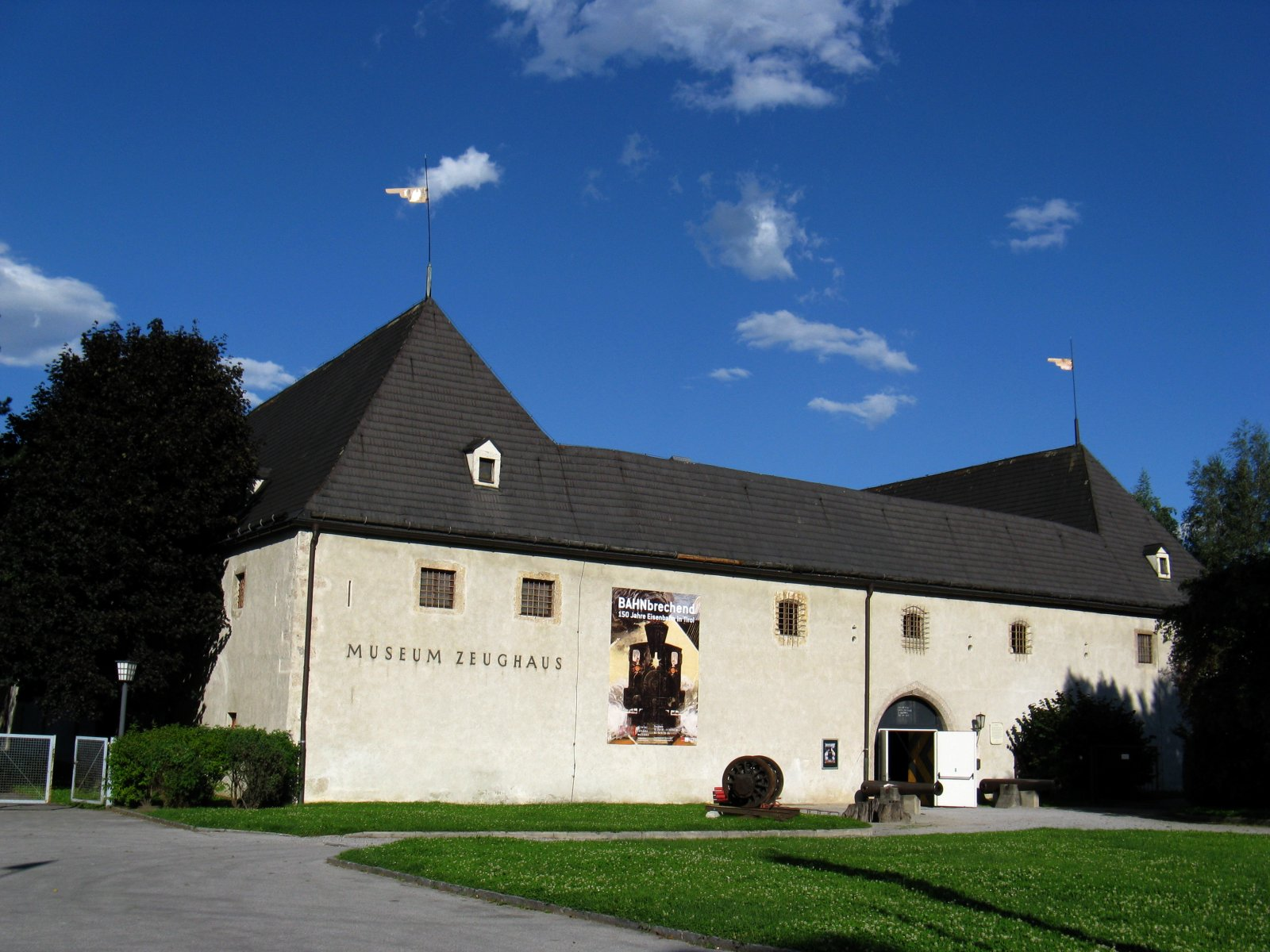
Armoury

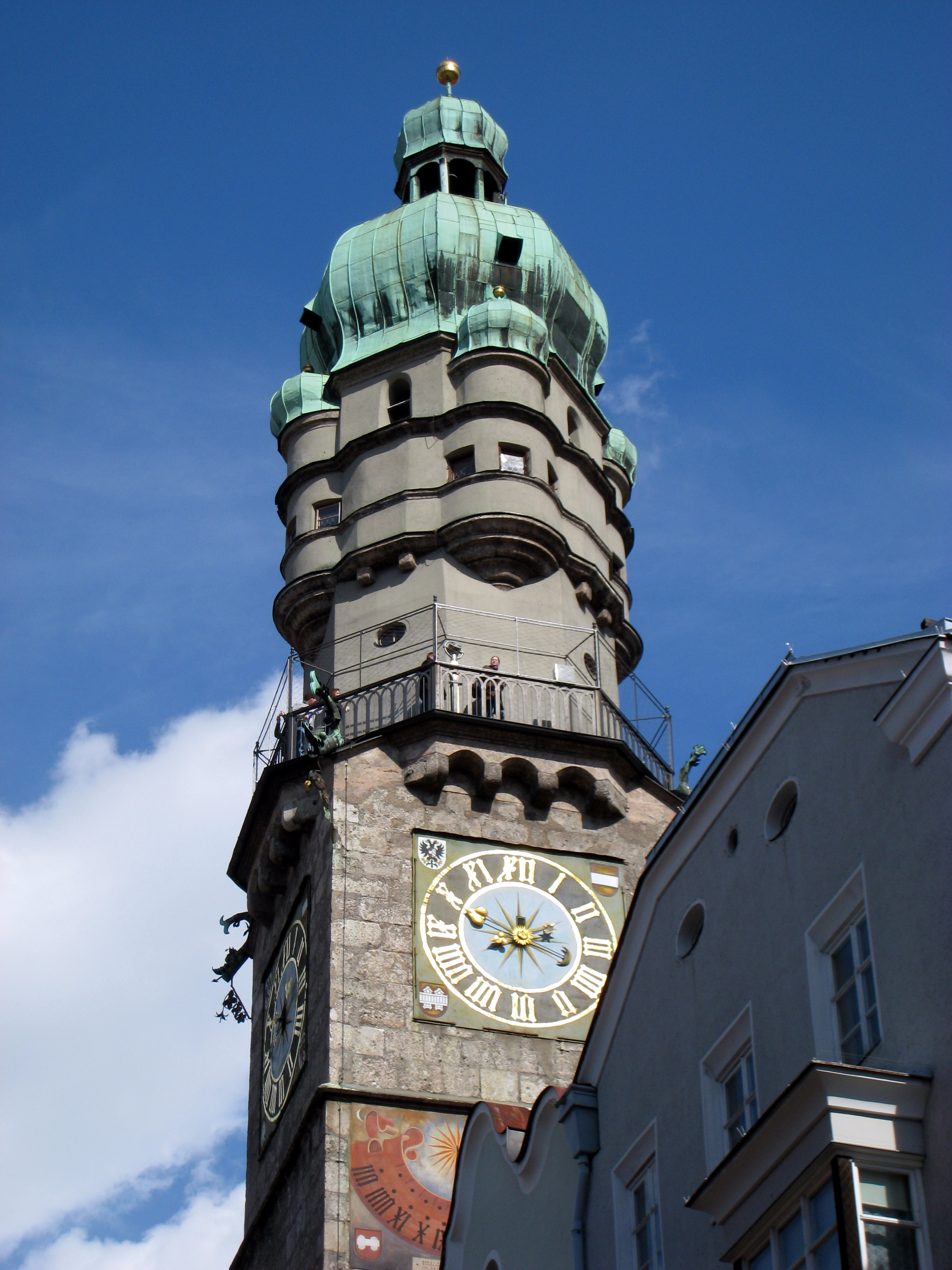
City Tower (Stadtturm)

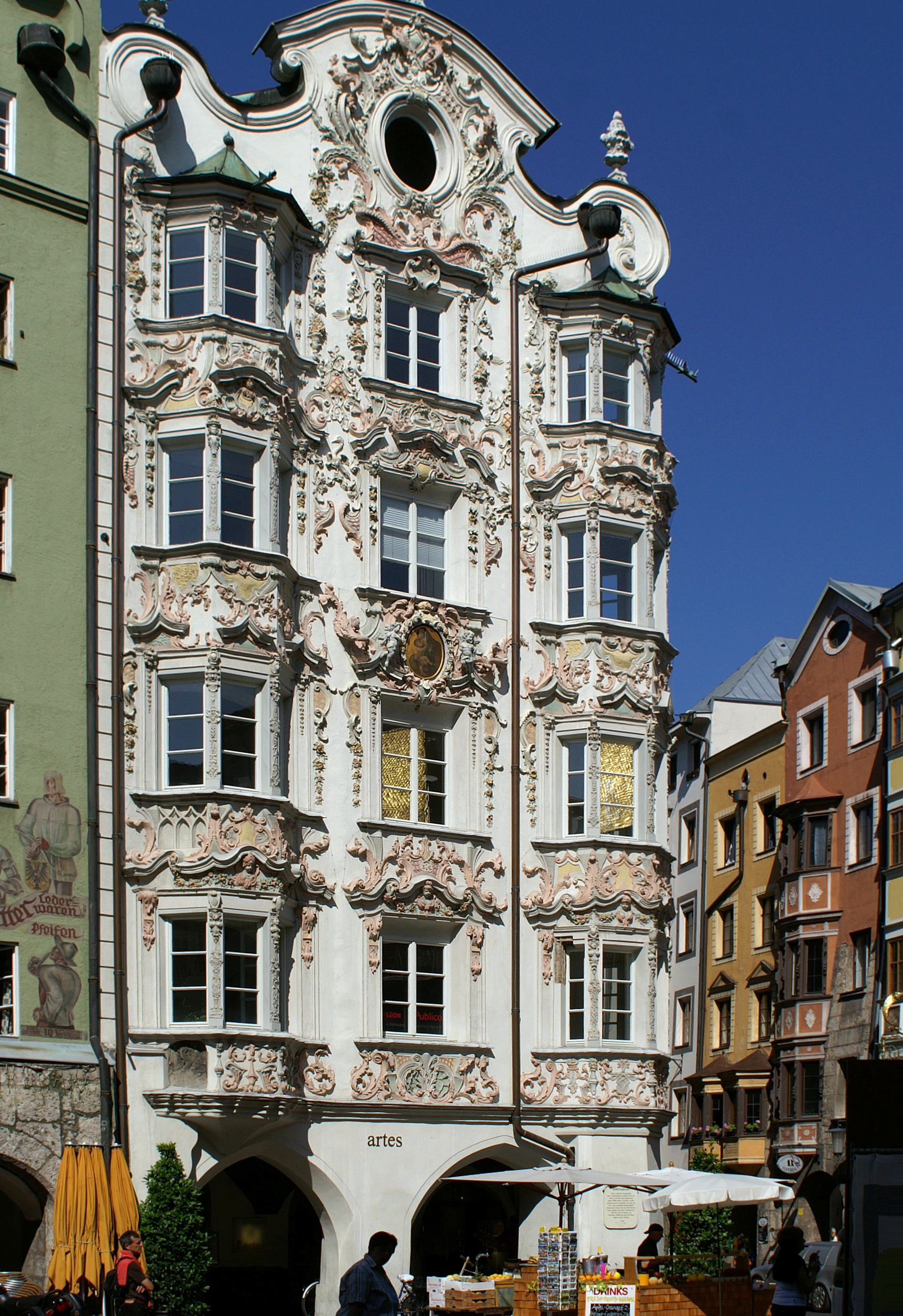
Helblinghaus

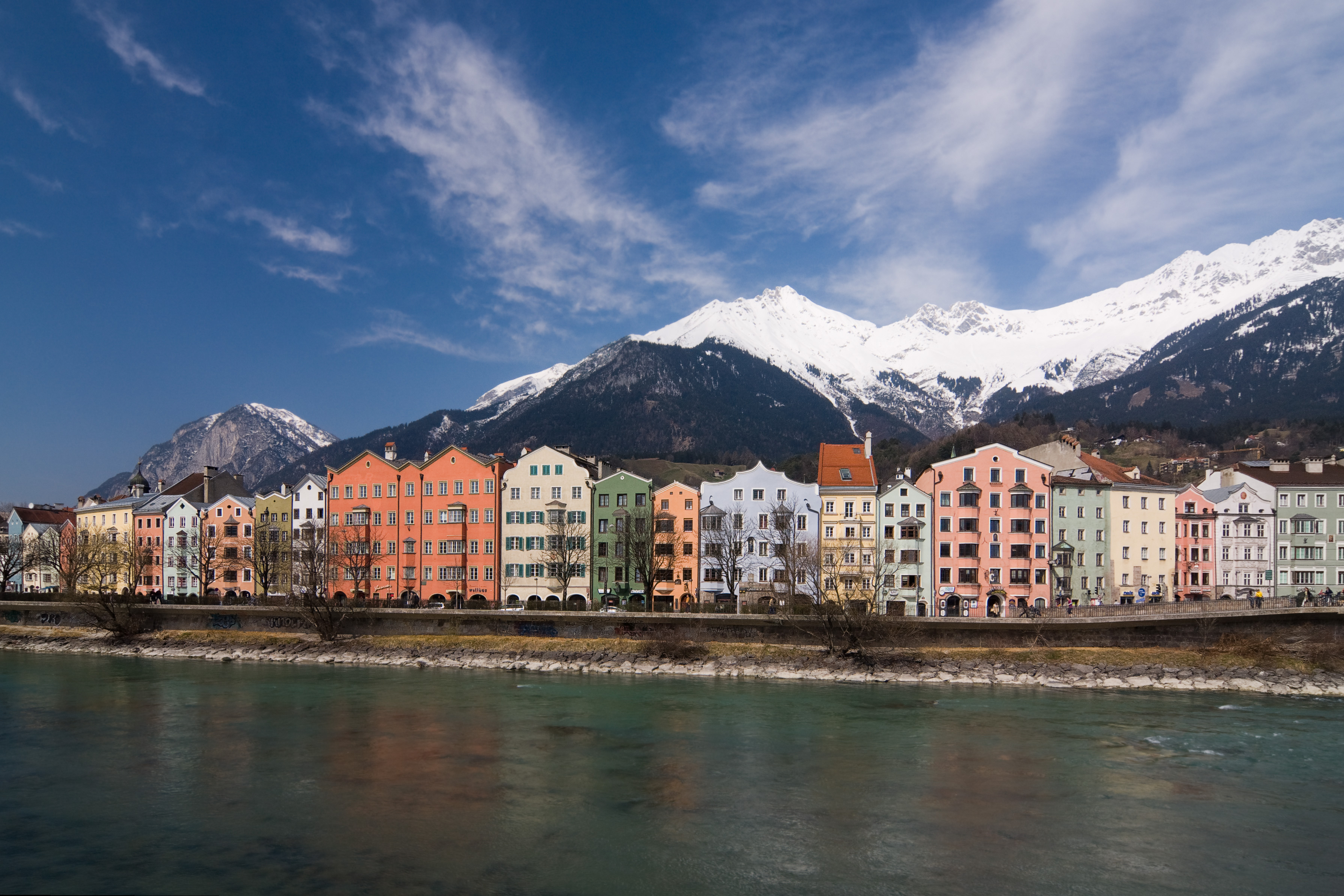
Innsbruck from the Inn river (looking towards Nordkette)

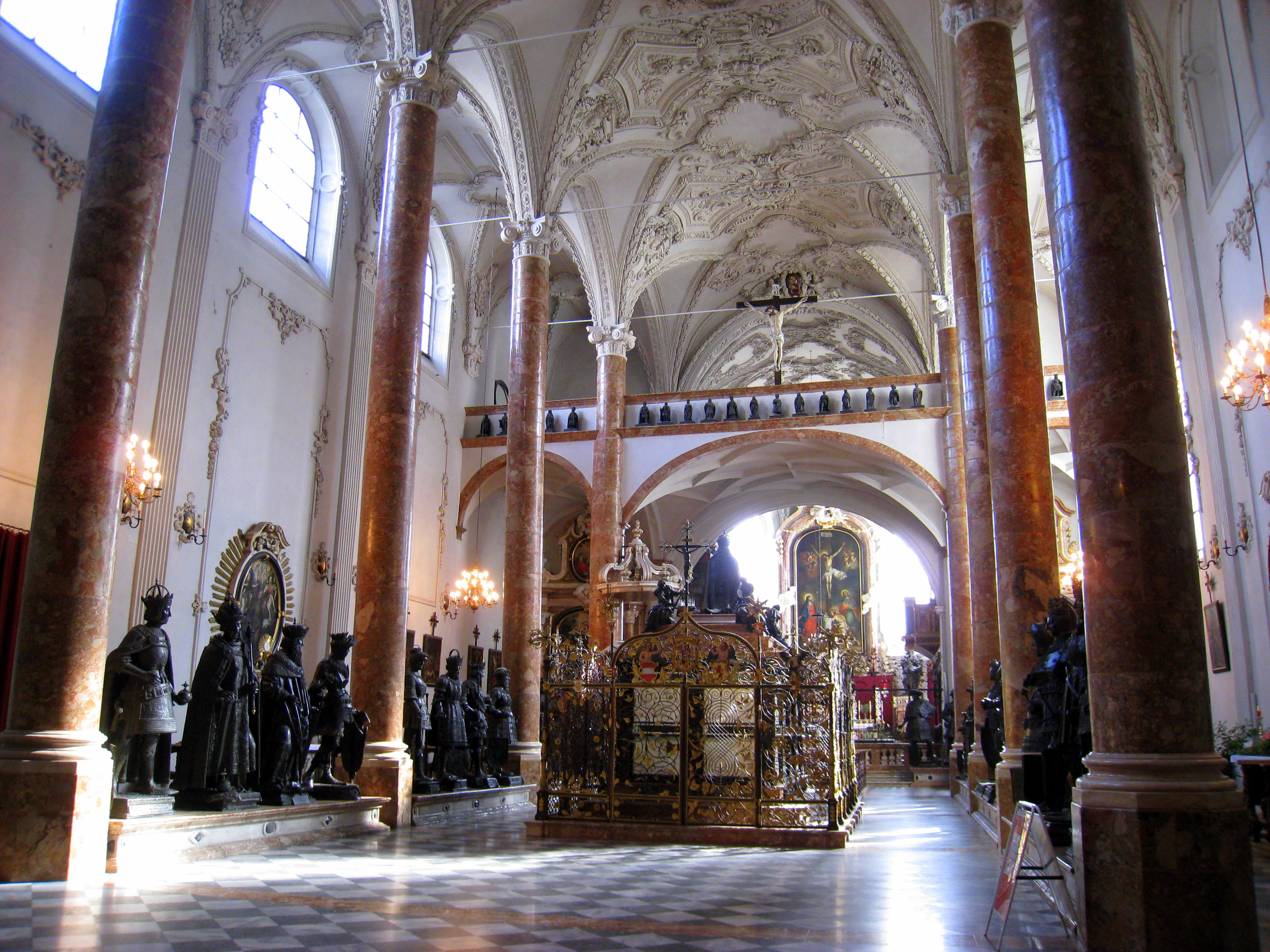
Maximilian's Cenotaph and the Black Men in the Court Church

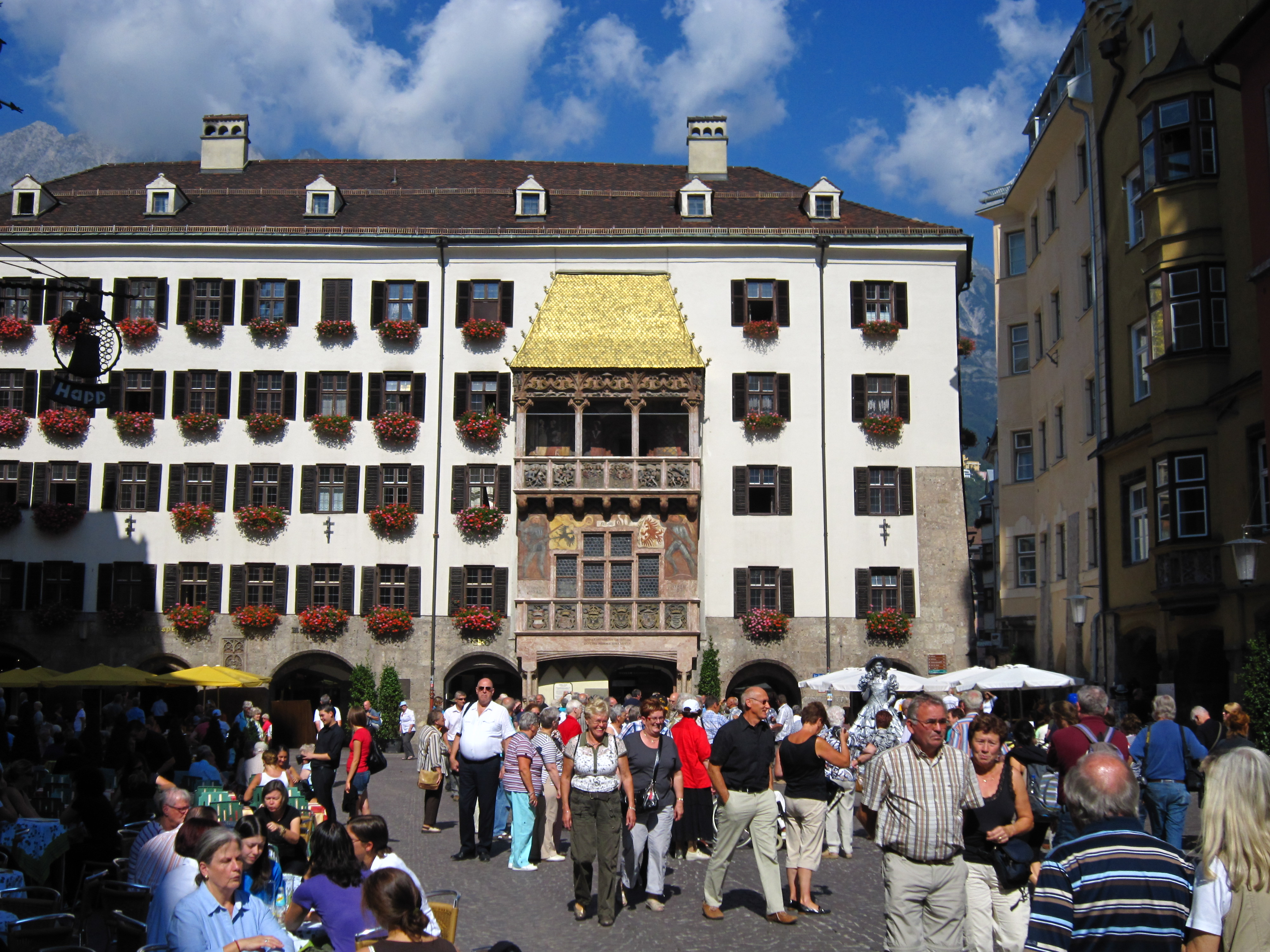
Old Town (Altstadt) with the Goldenes Dachl

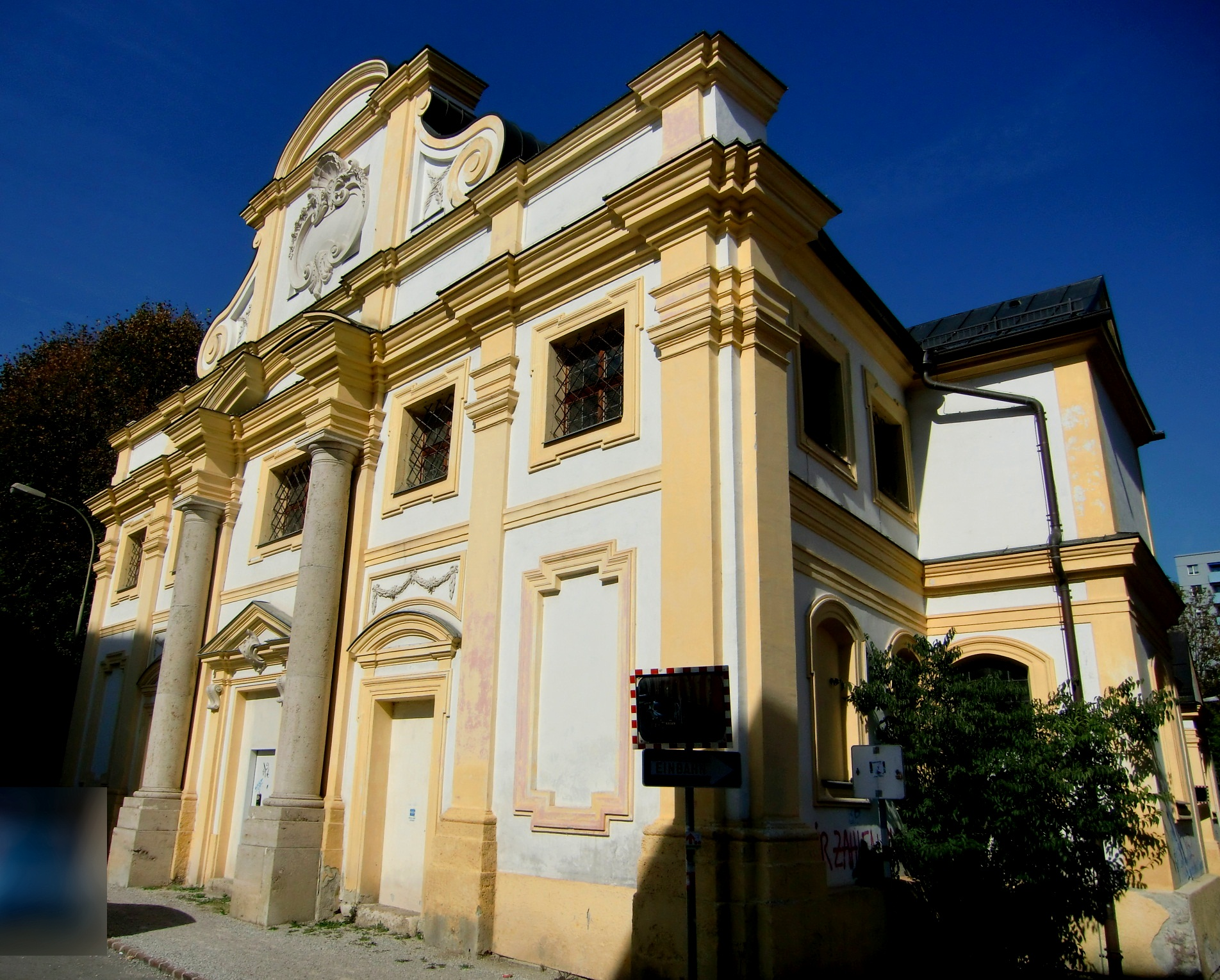
Siebenkreuzkapelle

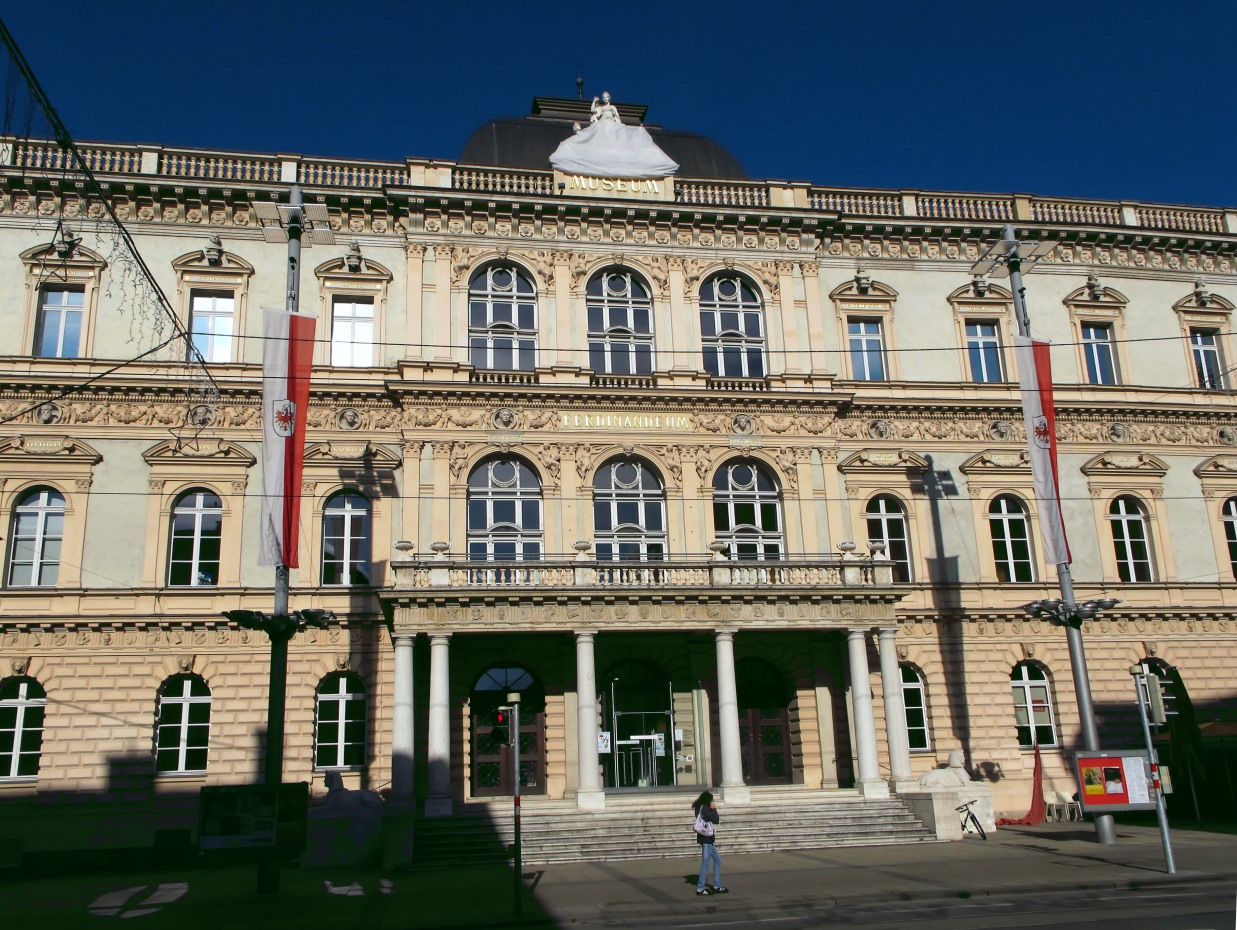
Tyrolean State Museum (Tiroler Landesmuseum)

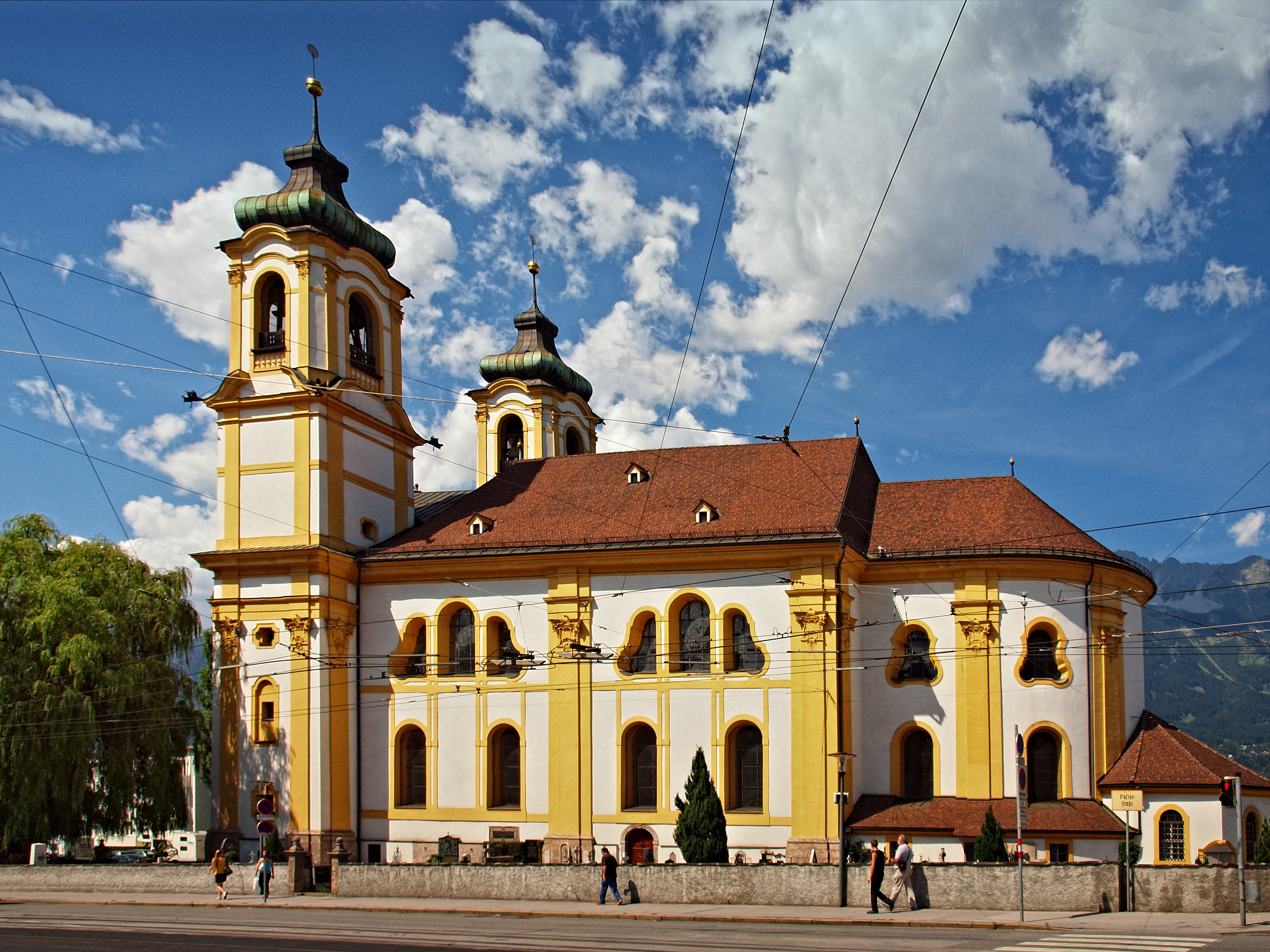
Wilten Basilica

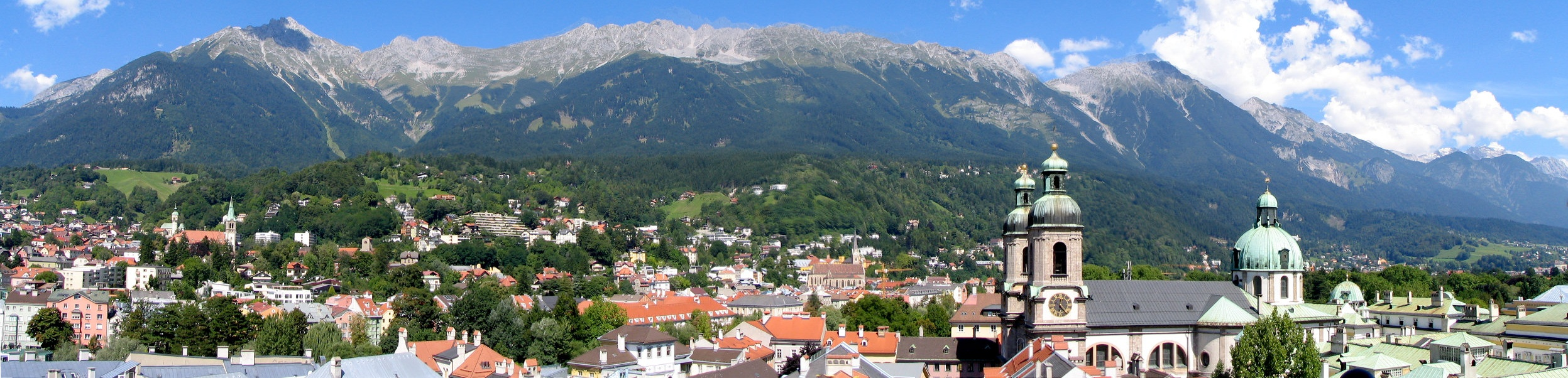
Panoramic view looking north to the Nordkette

== Demographics ==
As of 2026, Innsbruck had a population of 132,820; 68.6% of whom held Austrian citizenship and 65.2% of whom were born in Austria.

The age group under 20 years old accounted for 15.7% of the population, those aged between 20 and 64 made up 64.9%, and individuals aged 65 and over comprised the remaining 19.4%. Women accounted for 50.8% of the population.

54.4% of foreign citizens held citizenship from another EU member state. When looking at individual countries, Germany accounts for the largest share of foreign nationals.

Largest groups of foreign residents
Nationality	Population (2026)
Germany	10,804
Italy	4,130
Syria	3,261
Turkey	2,846
Serbia	2,167
Romania	1,568
Bosnia and Herzegovina	1,376
Afghanistan	1,367
Croatia	1,184
Ukraine	1,045
Bulgaria	1,001
Hungary	808
Russian Federation	703
Iran	494
Poland	456
Iraq	420
Slovakia	405
Czech Republic	227
Kosovo	183
Slovenia	181
North Macedonia	65

== Politics ==
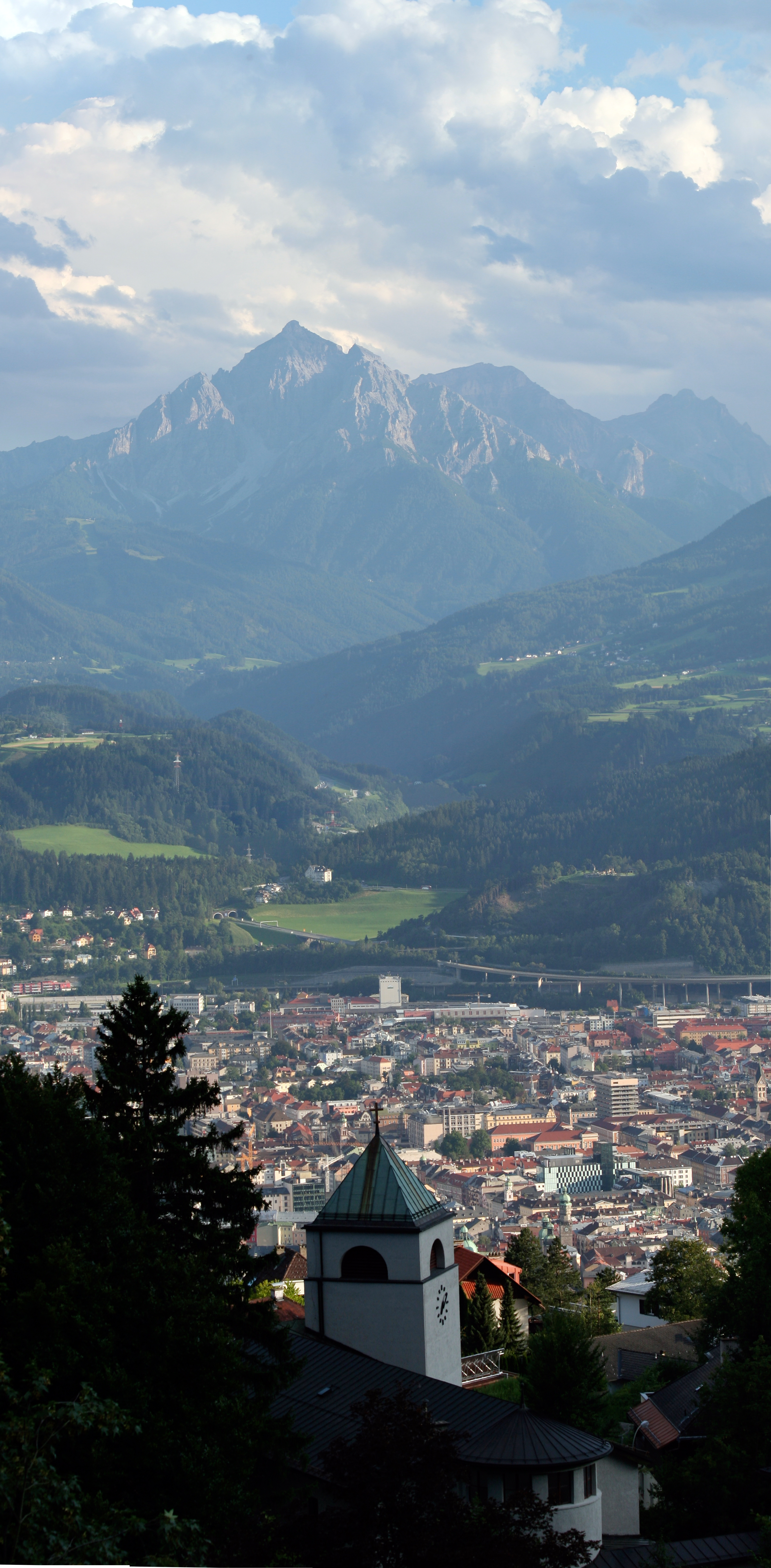
Panoramic view looking down with Serles in the background

=== Municipal council ===
The municipal council (Gemeinderat) consists of 40 members. Since the 2024 local elections, it is made up of the following parties:

- The Greens - The Green Alternative (GRÜNE): 8 seats
- Now Innsbruck - Johannes Anzengruber (JA): 8 seats
- Freedom Party of Austria (FPÖ): 7 seats
- Social Democratic Party of Austria (SPÖ): 6 seats
- Austrian People's Party (ÖVP): 4 seats
- Communist Party of Austria (KPÖ): 3 seats
- List Fritz - Citizen's Forum Tyrol (FRITZ): 2 seats
- Alternative List Innsbruck (ALI): 2 seats

The current mayor, Johannes Anzengruber, was elected in 2024, defeating incumbent Georg Willi.

=== City's senate ===
The City's senate (Stadtsenat) consists of 7 members. It is chaired by the mayor. The other members—one vice-mayor and five town councillors—are appointed by the municipal council, with party affiliations according to the election results.

- Mayor Johannes Anzengruber (JA)
- Deputy Mayor Georg Willi (GRÜNE)
- Councillor Janine Bex (GRÜNE)
- Councillor Mariella Lutz (JA)
- Councillor Markus Lassenberger (FPÖ)
- Councillor Elisabeth Mayr (SPÖ)
- Councillor Markus Stoll (ÖVP)

== Culture ==
=== Cultural events ===
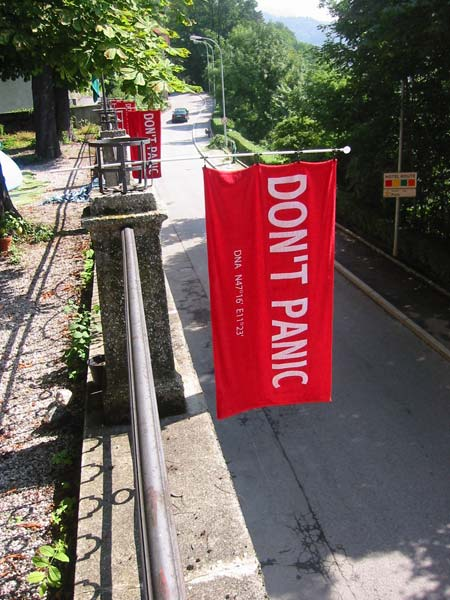
Towel Day Innsbruck − Towels with a silkscreen print as homage to Douglas Adams. Next to the words 'DON'T PANIC' there are the GPS data from the city Innsbruck where Adams had the idea for the Hitchhiker's Guide to the Galaxy.

Innsbruck is a very popular tourist destination, organising the following events every year:

- Innsbrucker Tanzsommer
- Bergsilvester (New Year's Eve)
- Innsbrucker Festwochen der Alten Musik (Innsbruck Festival of Early Music)
- Los Gurkos Short Film Festival
- Christkindlmarkt (Christmas fair)

In 1971, author Douglas Adams was inspired to write the internationally successful The Hitchhiker's Guide to the Galaxy series while lying intoxicated in a field in Innsbruck. From 2003 onwards each year, Towel Day is celebrated worldwide on 25 May.

=== Sports ===
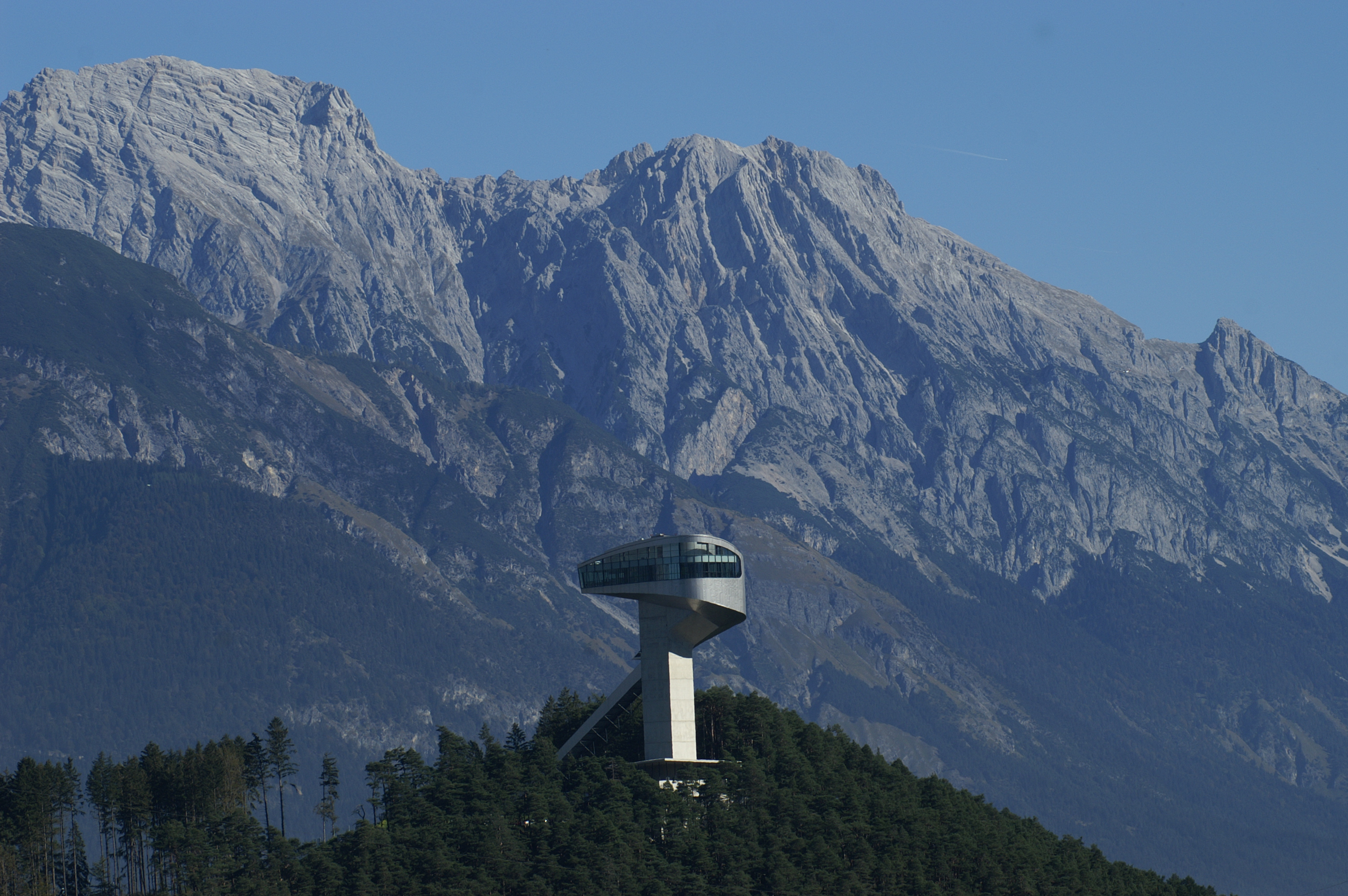
Bergiselschanze ski jumping facility

Due to its location between high mountains, Innsbruck serves as an ideal place for skiing in winter, ski-jumping and mountaineering in summer. There are several ski resorts around Innsbruck, with the Nordkette served by a cable car and additional chair lifts further up. Other ski resorts nearby include Axamer Lizum, Muttereralm, Patscherkofel, Igls, Seefeld, Tulfes and Stubai Valley. The glaciated terrain in the latter makes skiing possible even in summer months.

The Winter Olympic Games were held in Innsbruck twice, first in 1964, then again in 1976, when Colorado voters rejected a bond referendum in 1972 to finance the Denver games, originally awarded in 1970. The 1976 Winter Olympics were the last games held in the German-speaking Alps (Austria, Germany, or Switzerland).

Along with St. Moritz, Switzerland, Lake Placid, United States, and Cortina, Italy, it is one of four places which have twice hosted the Winter Games. It also hosted the 1984 and 1988 Winter Paralympics.

Innsbruck hosted the 1st Winter Youth Olympic Games in 2012.

Other notable events held in Innsbruck include the Air & Style Snowboard Contest from 1994 to 1999 and 2008 and the Ice Hockey World Championship in 2005. Together with the city of Seefeld, Innsbruck organised the Winter Universiade in 2005. Innsbruck's Bergiselschanze is one of the hills of the famous Four Hills Tournament.

Innsbruck is home to football clubs WSG Tirol and FC Wacker Innsbruck, who play in the Austrian Bundesliga and the Austrian Landesliga respectively. Former teams include the FC Swarovski Tirol and FC Tirol Innsbruck. The teams' stadium, Tivoli Neu, is one of eight stadiums which hosted Euro 2008, which took place in Switzerland and Austria in June 2008.

The city is home to the American football team Raiders Tirol. Innsbruck hosted an American football final, Eurobowl XXII between the Swarco Raiders Tirol and the Raiffeisen Vikings Vienna.

The city hosted opening round games in the 2011 IFAF World Championship, the official international American football championship.

In 2018, Innsbruck hosted the IFSC Climbing World Championships 2018 from 6 to 16 September and the 2018 UCI Road World Championships from 22 to 30 September.

In July 2025, Innsbruck hosted the Roller Derby World Cup.

=== Language ===
Innsbruck is part of the Austro-Bavarian region of dialects and, more specifically, Southern Bavarian (Südbairisch). Irina Windhaber, professor for linguistics at the Universität Innsbruck, has observed a trend among young people to choose more often Standard German language structures and pronunciation.

== Economy and infrastructure ==
Innsbruck is a substantial tourist centre, with more than a million overnight stays.

In Innsbruck, there are 86,186 employees and about 12,038 employers. 7,598 people are self-employed. Nearly 35,000 people commute every day into Innsbruck from the surrounding communities in the area. The unemployment rate for the year 2012 was 4.2%.

The national statistics office, Statistik Austria, does not produce economic data for the City of Innsbruck alone, but on aggregate level with the Innsbruck-Land District summarised as NUTS 3-region Innsbruck. In 2013, GDP per capita in the NUTS 3-region Innsbruck was €41,400 which is around 60% above the EU average.

The headquarters of Tiroler Wasserkraft (Tiwag, energy production), Bank für Tirol und Vorarlberg (financial services), Tiroler Versicherung (insurance) and MED-EL (medical devices) are located in Innsbruck. The headquarters of Swarovski (glass), Felder Group (mechanical engineering) and Swarco (traffic technology) are located within 20 km (12 mi) from the city.

Residential property is very expensive by national standards. The average price per square metre in Innsbruck is €4,430 (2015), which is the second highest per square meter price among Austrian cities surpassed only by Salzburg (€4,823), but followed by Vienna (€3,980).

== Transport ==
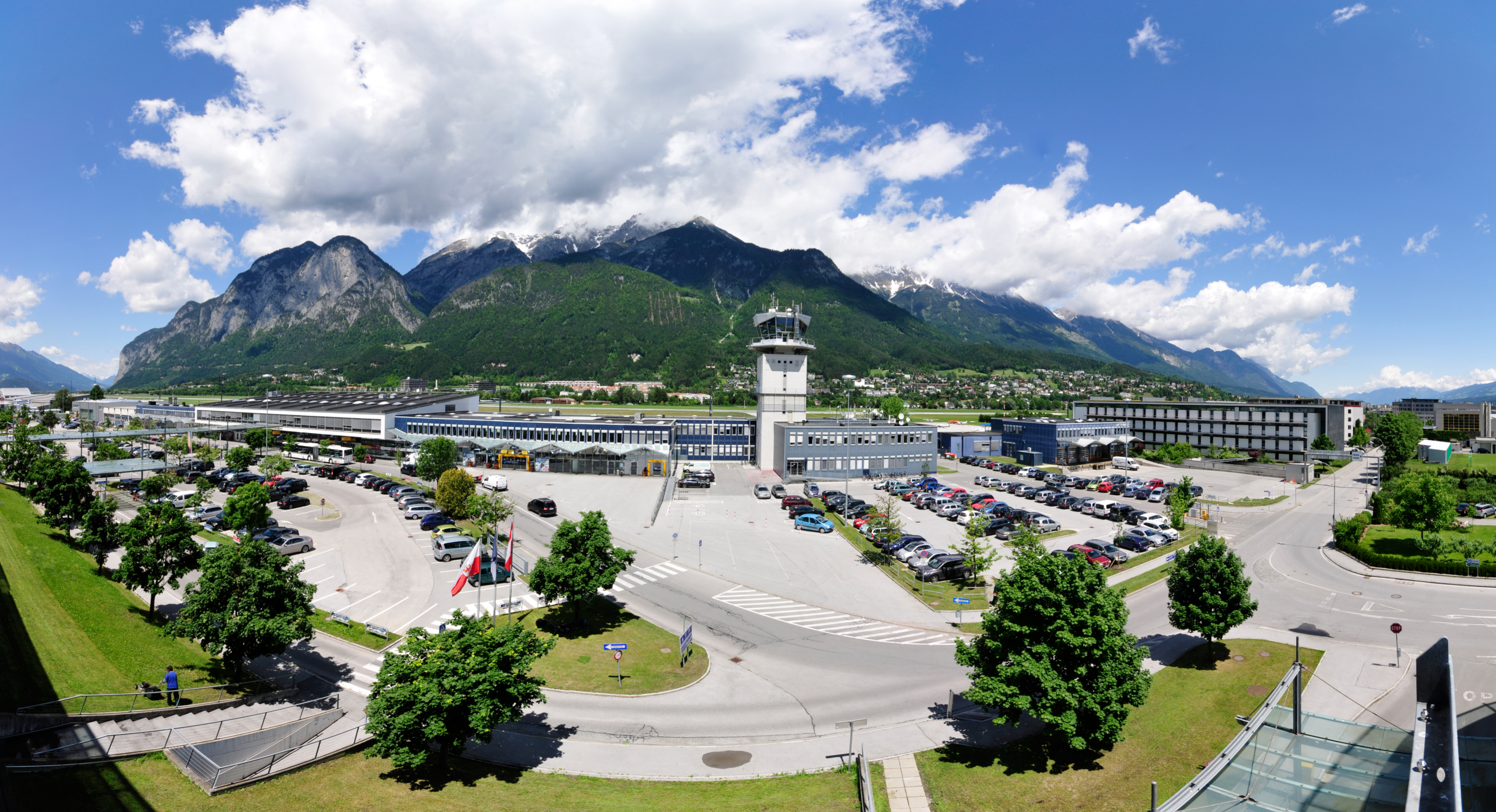
Innsbruck Airport

Innsbruck is located along the A12/A13 highway corridor (Inn Valley Autobahn and Brenner Autobahn respectively), providing freeway access to Verona, Italy and Munich, Germany. The A12 and A13 converge near Innsbruck, at which point the A13 terminates.

Innsbruck Hauptbahnhof, the most important railway station of Innsbruck and Tyrol, is one of the busiest railway stations in Austria. It is served by the Lower Inn Valley line to Germany and eastern Austria, the Arlberg line to the west and the Brenner line, which connects northern Italy with southern Germany via the Brenner Pass. Since December 2007, suburban services have been operated as the Innsbruck S-Bahn. Innsbruck is the northern end of a major tunnel through the Alps for freight and passenger railway service, called the Brenner Base Tunnel. The tunnel project is expected to be complete by 2032. It will provide a less steep railway route that can also shorten travel time dramatically.

Innsbruck Airport is located in the suburb of Kranebitten, which is located in the west of the city. It provides services to airports including Frankfurt, London, Amsterdam and Vienna. It also handles regional flights around the Alps, as well as seasonal flights to other destinations. During the winter, activity increases significantly, due to the high number of skiers travelling to the region. The airport is approximately 4 kilometres (2.5 mi) from the centre of Innsbruck.

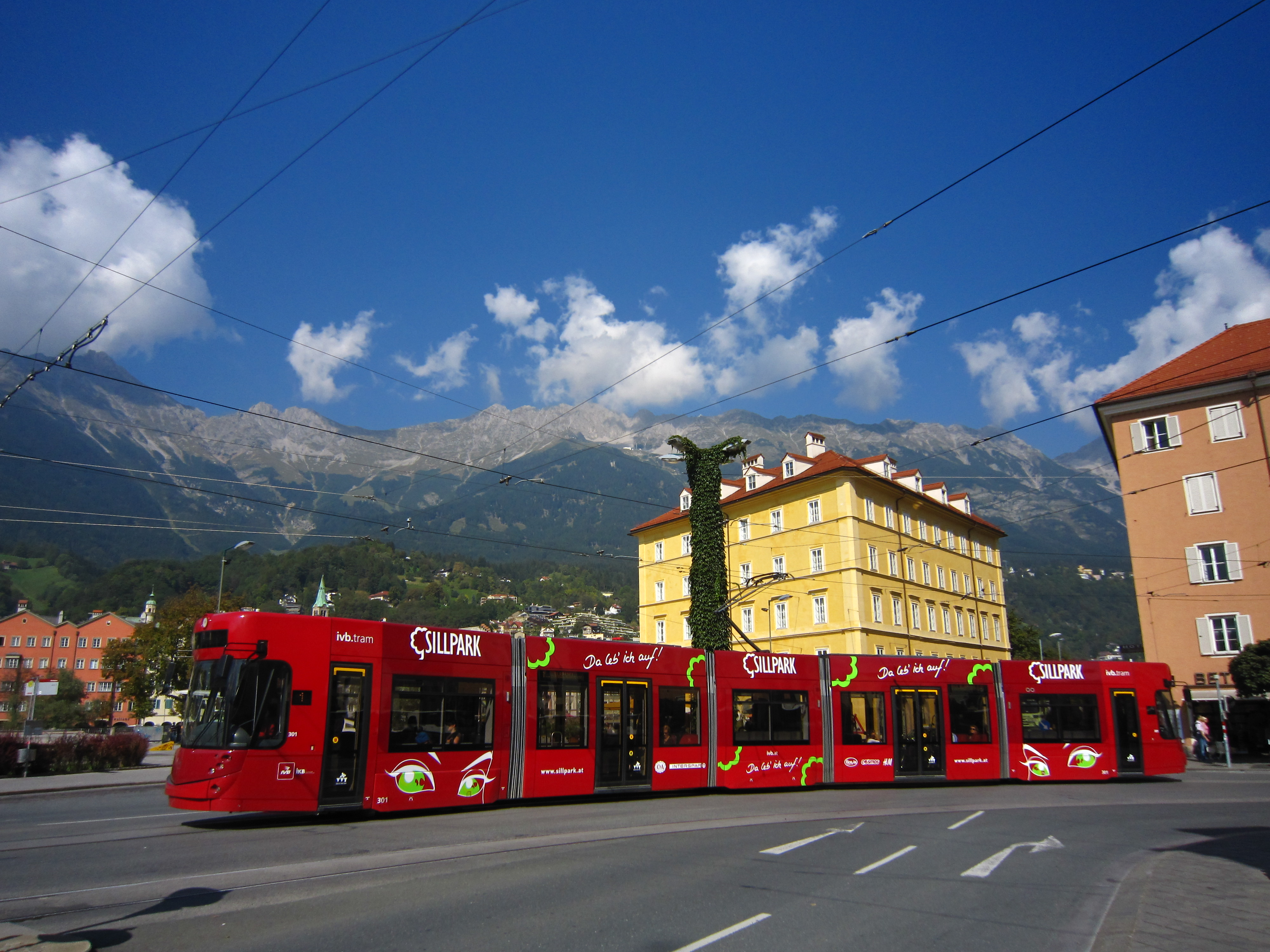
Trambahn in Innsbruck

Local public transport is provided by Innsbrucker Verkehrsbetriebe (IVB), a public authority operating a network of bus and tram routes. The metre-gauge tram network consists of four city lines, 1, 2, 3 and 5, and two lines serving the surrounding area: line 6, the Innsbrucker Mittelgebirgsbahn to Igls, and line STB, the Stubaitalbahn running through the Stubai Valley to Fulpmes. The network is planned to be enlarged during the coming years to reach the neighboring village Rum in the east and Völs in the west. Numerous bus lines serve the inner city and connect it with surrounding areas. Until 2007, the bus network included two trolleybus routes; they were abandoned in preparation for planned expansion of the tram network, but reinstatement of trolleybuses is planned for 2029.

In December 2007, the Hungerburgbahn, a funicular service to the district of Hungerburg, was reopened after a two-year closure for extensive rebuilding, with partial realignment and a new extension under the Inn River and into central Innsbruck. The line was also equipped with new vehicles. Because of the unique design of the stations, drafted by the famous architect Zaha Hadid, the funicular evolves immediately to a new emblem of the city. The line was rebuilt by the Italian company Leitner, and can now carry up to 1,200 persons per hour. It is operated by a private company, the 'Innsbrucker Nordkettenbahnen'.

== Education ==
Innsbruck is a university city, with several locally based colleges and universities.

Innsbruck is home to the oldest grammar school (Gymnasium) of Western Austria, the "Akademisches Gymnasium Innsbruck". The school was founded in 1562 by the Jesuit order and was the precursor of the university, founded in 1669.

Innsbruck hosts several universities. The most well-known are the University of Innsbruck (Leopold-Franzens-Universität), the Innsbruck Medical University, and the university of applied sciences MCI Management Center Innsbruck.

== Organisations ==
- The international headquarters of SOS Children's Villages, one of the world's largest charities, is located in Innsbruck.
- The internationally active NGO Austrian Service Abroad was founded in Innsbruck in 1992 by Andreas Maislinger and Andreas Hörtnagl. Its central office is located at Hutterweg, Innsbruck.
- Innsbruck has two universities, the Leopold-Franzens-Universität Innsbruck and the Innsbruck Medical University. The Innsbruck Medical University has one of Europe's premier ski injury clinics.
- The international headquarters of MED-EL, one of the largest producers of cochlear implants, is located in Innsbruck.
- The Aouda.X space suit simulator is being developed by the OeWF in Innsbruck. Also, the Mission Support Centre for many of the OeWF Mars analogue missions is situated in the city. This MSC used time delayed communication with Camp Weyprecht in the desert near Erfoud, Morocco for the MARS2013 expedition during February 2013.

== Notable residents ==
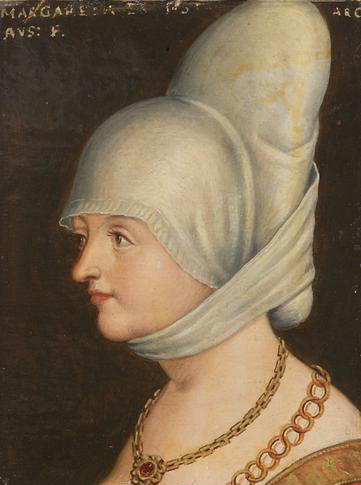
Margaret of Austria

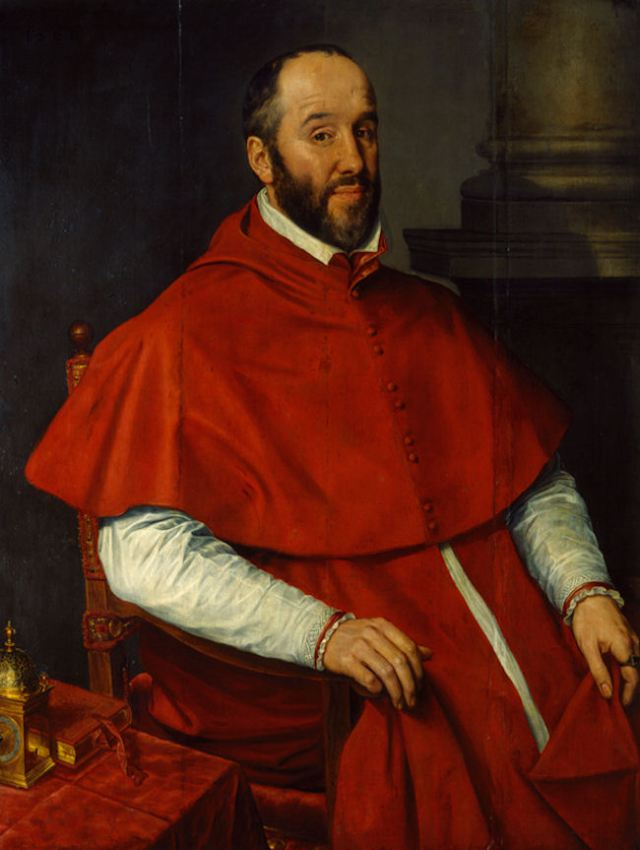
Antoine Perrenot de Granvelle, 1561

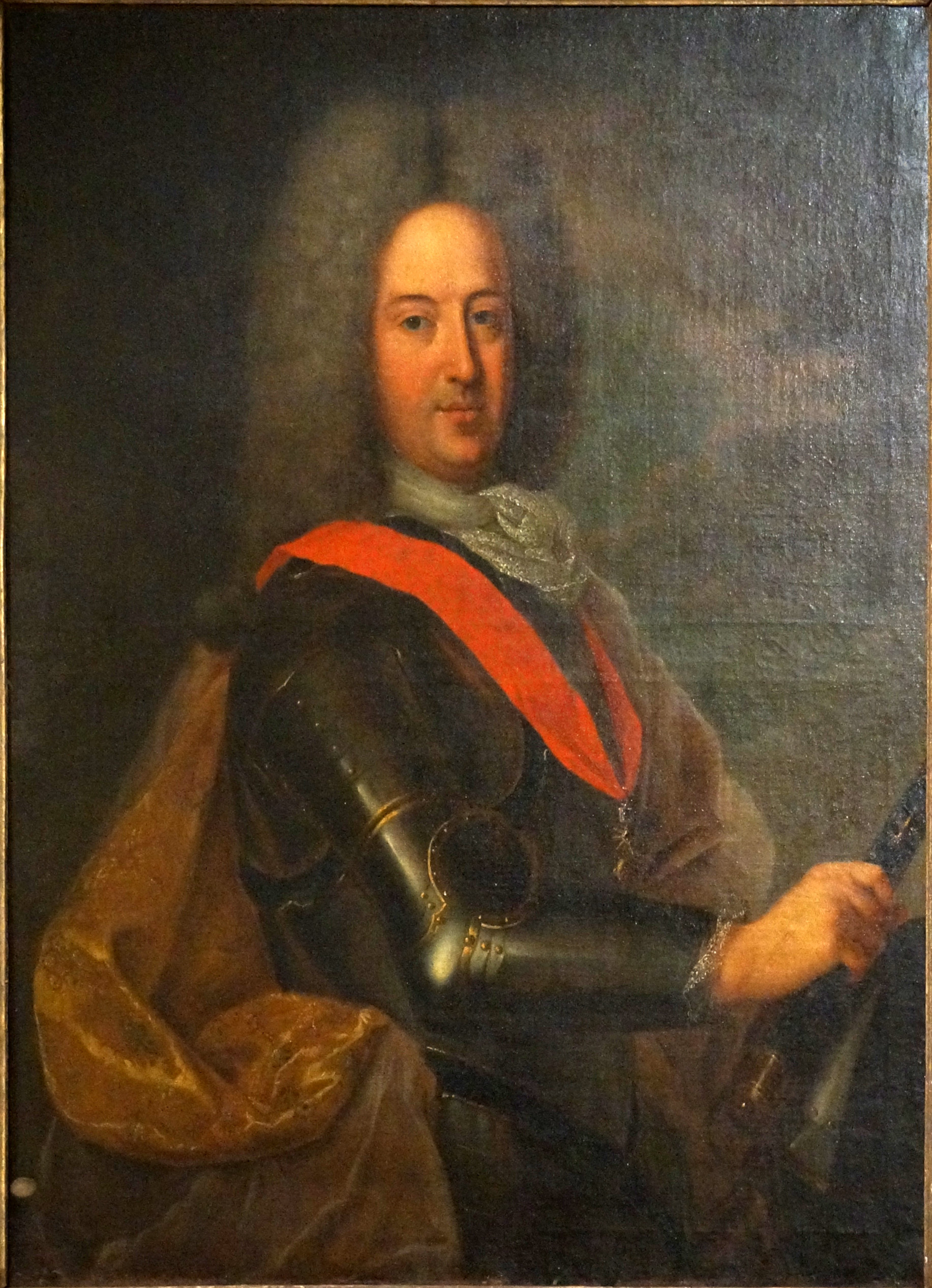
Leopold, Duke of Lorraine, 1703

=== Monarchy and aristocracy ===
- Frederick III, Holy Roman Emperor (1415–1493), Holy Roman Emperor from 1452 until his death, the first emperor of the House of Habsburg.
- Margaret of Austria, Electress of Saxony (c. 1416–1486), member of the House of Habsburg, was Electress of Saxony 1431–1464 by her marriage with the Wettin elector Frederick II. She was a sister of Emperor Frederick III.
- Sigismund, Archduke of Austria (1427–1496), Habsburg archduke of Austria and ruler of Tyrol from 1446 to 1490
- Elisabeth of Brandenburg (1510–1558), princess of the House of Hohenzollern and a Margravine of Brandenburg
- Antoine Perrenot de Granvelle (1517–1586), Comte de La Baume Saint Amour, Burgundian statesman, followed his father as a leading minister of the Spanish Habsburgs.
- Catherine of Austria, Queen of Poland (1533–1572), one of the fifteen children of Ferdinand I, Holy Roman Emperor and Anna of Bohemia and Hungary
- Anna of Tyrol (1585–1618), by birth Archduchess of Austria and member of the Tyrolese branch of the House of Habsburg and by marriage Holy Roman Empress
- Archduchess Isabella Clara of Austria (1629–1685), by birth Archduchess of Austria as a member of the Tyrolese branch of the House of Habsburg
- Sigismund Francis, Archduke of Austria (1630–1665), ruler of Further Austria including Tyrol
- Maria Leopoldine of Austria-Tyrol (1632–1649), by birth Archduchess of Austria and member of the Tyrolese branch of the House of Habsburg and by marriage the second spouse of her first cousin, Holy Roman Emperor Ferdinand III
- Archduchess Claudia Felicitas of Austria (1653–1676), by birth Archduchess of Austria and by marriage Holy Roman Empress and the second wife of Leopold I
- Leopold, Duke of Lorraine (1679–1729), surnamed the Good, was Duke of Lorraine and Bar from 1690
- Ignaz Anton von Indermauer (1759–1796), nobleman who was murdered in a peasant revolt
- Henry Taaffe, 12th Viscount Taaffe (1872–1928), landowner, held hereditary titles from Austria & Ireland until 1919 when he lost both; son of Eduard Taaffe, 11th Viscount Taaffe.
- Prince Johannes Heinrich of Saxe-Coburg and Gotha (1931–2010), prince of the House of Saxe-Coburg and Gotha-Koháry

=== Public service ===
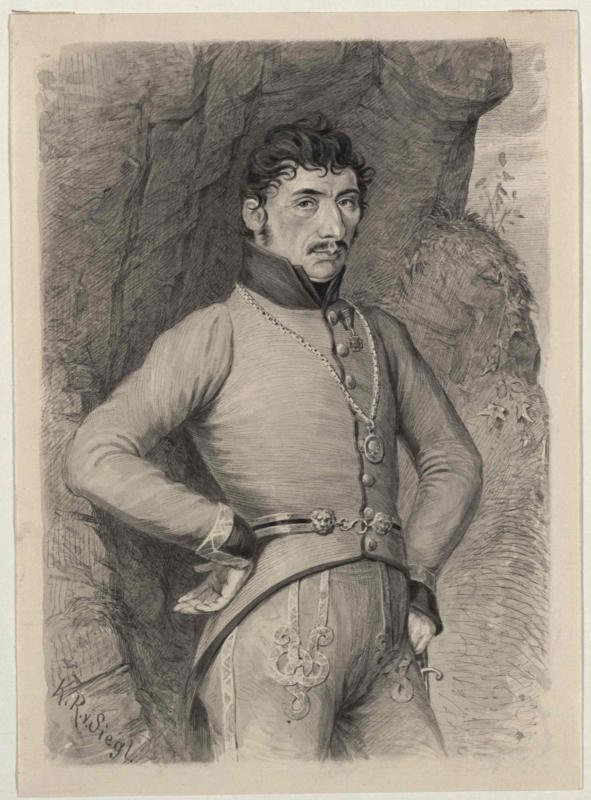
Josef Speckbacher, 1891

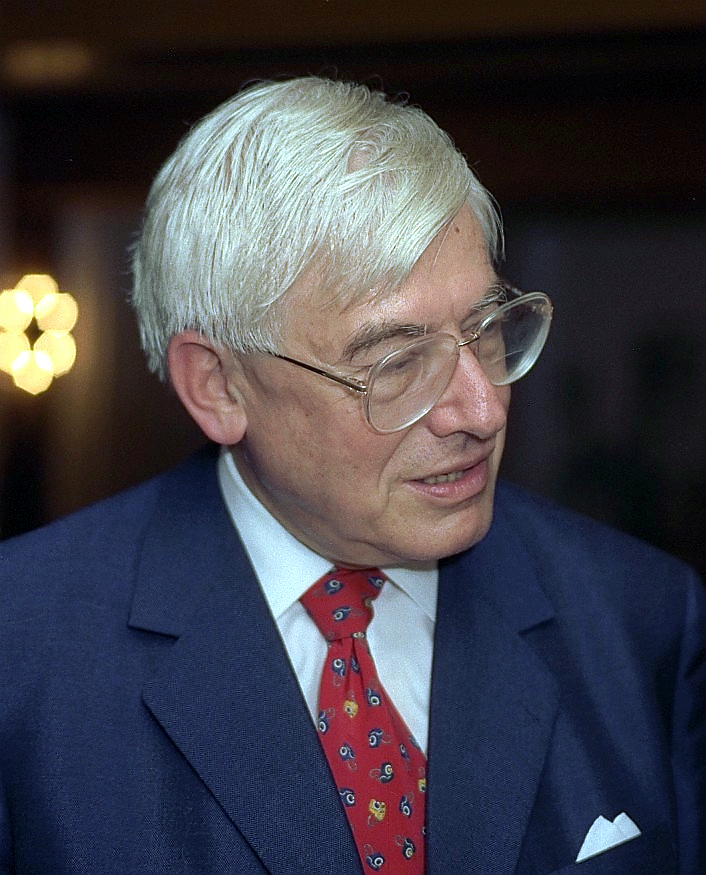
Christian Schwarz-Schilling, 1993

- Eusebio Kino (1645–1711), Jesuit missionary and explorer of Northwest Mexico and Southwest US, student and later teacher at Akademisches Gymnasium Innsbruck.
- Josef Speckbacher (1767–1820), a leading figure in the rebellion of the Tyrol against Napoleon
- Joseph Hormayr, Baron zu Hortenburg (1781/2–1848) statesman and historian.
- Hermann von Gilm (1812–1864), lawyer and poet
- Vinzenz Maria Gredler (1823 in Telfs – 1912), a Dominican friar, classicist, philosopher theologian and naturalist
- Ignatius Klotz (1843–1911), American farmer and politician in Wisconsin
- Oswald Redlich (1858–1944), historian and archivist of auxiliary sciences of history
- Heinrich Schenkl (1859–1919), classical philologist, son of Karl Schenkl
- Diana Budisavljević (1891–1978), humanitarian who led a major relief effort in Yugoslavia during World War II
- Blessed Jakob Gapp (1897–1943), Roman Catholic priest and a Marianist.
- Karl Gruber (1909–1995), an Austrian politician and diplomat
- Reinhold Stecher (1921–2013), Roman Catholic prelate, Bishop of the Diocese of Innsbruck, 1980 to 1997.
- Professor Dr. Christian Schwarz-Schilling (born 1930), a German politician, entrepreneur, philanthropist and media and telecommunications innovator.
- Marcello Spatafora (born 1941), Italian diplomat, former Permanent Representative of Italy to the United Nations
- Heidemarie Cammerlander (born 1942), member of the Municipal Council and Landtag of Vienna
- Gerhard Pfanzelter (born 1943), prominent Austrian diplomat.
- Andreas Maislinger (born 1955), Austrian historian and founder of the Austrian Holocaust Memorial Service
- Christoph Hofinger (born 1967), researcher and political consultant
- Gabriel Kuhn (born 1972), political writer and translator based in Sweden
- René Benko (born 1977), real estate investor and founder of Signa Holding

=== War figures ===
- Raoul Stojsavljevic (1887–1930), World War I flying ace
- Otto Hofmann (1896–1982), SS-Obergruppenführer director of Nazi Germany's "Race and Settlement Main Office", sentenced to 25 years for war crimes in 1948, pardoned 1954
- Robert Bernardis (1908–1944), resistance fighter, part of the attempt to kill Adolf Hitler in the 20 July Plot in 1944.
- Josefine Brunner (1909–1943), socialist, resistance member and victim of the Nazi regime
- Anton Malloth (1912–2002), a supervisor in the Theresienstadt concentration camp.
- Constanze Manziarly (1920–1945), cook/dietitian to Adolf Hitler until her final days in 1945

=== Arts ===
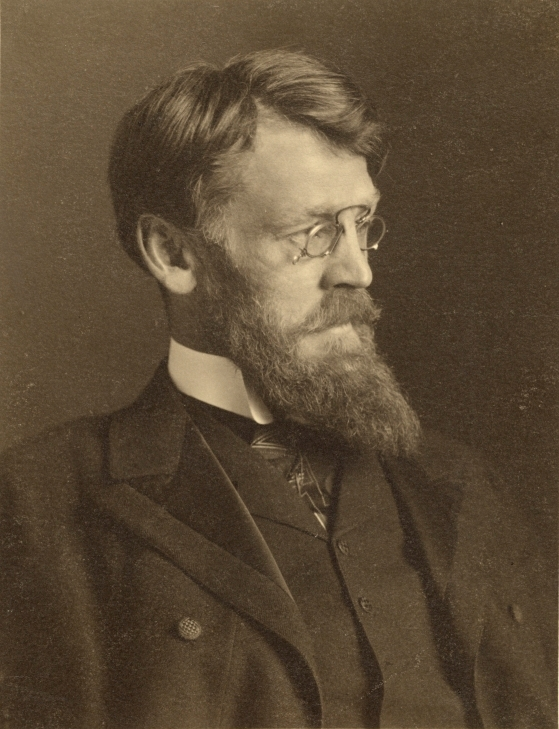
Karl Schönherr

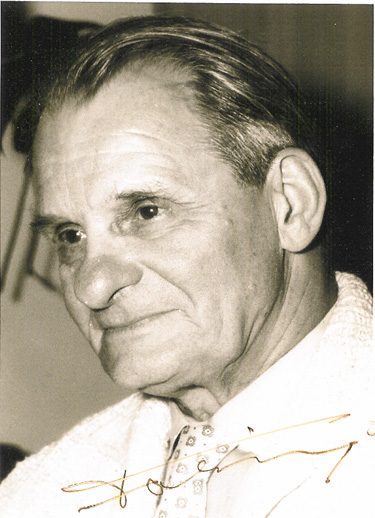
Erwin Faber, 1976

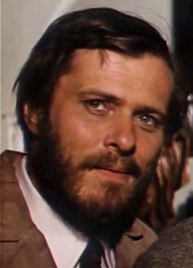
William Berger, 1967

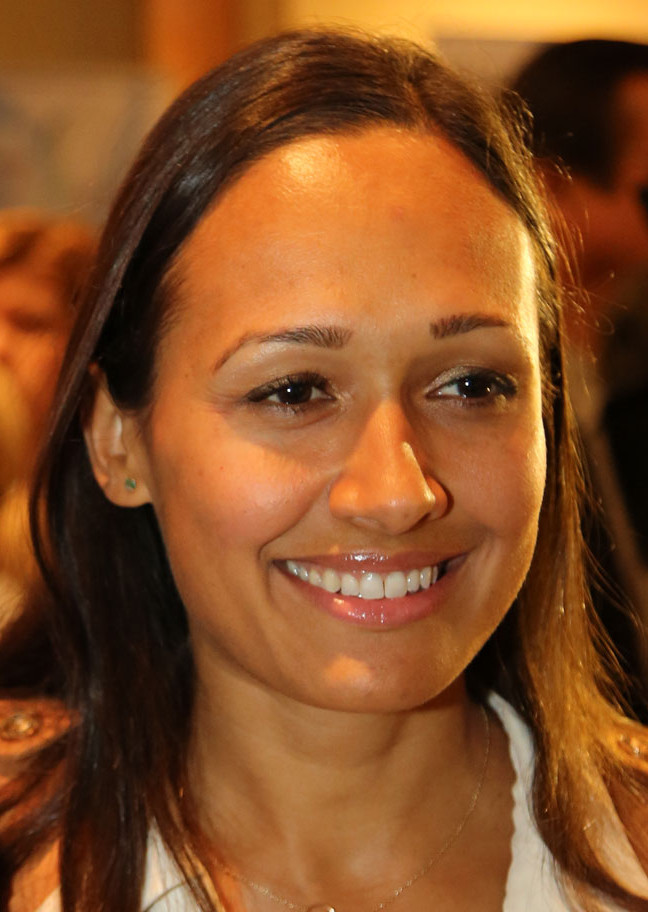
Alice Tumler, 2015

- Jacob Regnart (1540s–1599), Flemish Renaissance composer of sacred and secular music
- William Young (died 1662), English viol player and composer of the Baroque era, who worked at the court of Ferdinand Charles, Archduke of Austria in Innsbruck
- Johann Paul Schor (1615–1674), artist known in Rome as "Giovanni Paolo Tedesco"
- Michael Ignaz Mildorfer (1690–1747), painter, painted primarily religious themed works
- Josef Ignaz Mildorfer (1719–1775), painter of frescoes
- Franz Edmund Weirotter (1733–1771), painter, draughtsman and etcher of landscapes and maritime scenes
- Georg Mader (1824–1881), Austrian painter
- Edgar Meyer (1853–1925), painter, built himself a castle and engaged in politics
- Karl Schönherr (1867–1943), Austrian writer of Austrian Heimat themes
- Mimi Gstöttner-Auer (1886–1977), Austrian stage and film actress
- Clemens Holzmeister (1886–1983), architect and stage designer
- Erwin Faber (1891–1989), actor in Munich, in the late-1970s he performed at the Residenz Theatre
- Igo Sym (1896–1941), Austrian-born Polish actor and collaborator with Nazi Germany
- Carl-Heinz Schroth (1902–1989), actor and film director, appeared in 60 films
- Heinrich C. Berann (1915–1999), father of the modern panorama map, born into a family of painters and sculptors
- Peter Demant (1918–2006), Russian writer and public figure
- Judith Holzmeister (1920–2008), actress, married to the actor Curd Jürgens 1947–1955
- Otmar Suitner (1922–2010), conductor who spent most of his professional career in East Germany, Principal Conductor of the Staatskapelle Dresden from 1960 to 1964
- Dietmar Schönherr (1926–2014), Austrian film actor
- Ilse von Alpenheim (born 1927), pianist
- William Berger (1928–1993), Austrian American actor
- Erich Urbanner (born 1936), Austrian composer and teacher
- Peter Noever (born 1941), designer and curator–at–large of art and architecture
- Christian Berger (born 1945), Austrian cinematographer
- Radu Malfatti (born 1946), trombone player and composer
- Helga Anders (1948–1986), Austrian television actress
- Reed Gratz (born 1950), jazz pianist/composer, Professor at University of Innsbruck
- Gabriele Sima (1955–2016), opera singer
- Norbert Pümpel (born 1956), visual artist
- Gabriele Fontana (born 1958), Austrian operatic soprano
- Thomas Larcher (born 1963), Austrian composer and pianist
- Armin Wolf (born 1966), journalist and television anchor
- Eva Lind (born 1966), operatic soprano
- Aleksandar Marković (born 1975), Serbian, principal conductor of Tyrolean Opera House
- Alice Tumler (born 1978), television presenter
- Georg Neuhauser (born 1982), singer in Serenity (band)
- Manu Delago (born 1984), Hang player, percussionist and composer based in London
- Amira El Sayed (born 1991), Egyptian-Austrian actress and author
- Nathan Trent (born 1992), singer for Austria in the Eurovision Song Contest 2017
- Victoria Swarovski (born 1994), singer, TV presenter Let's Dance Germany, billionaire heiress of the Swarovski empire

=== Science ===
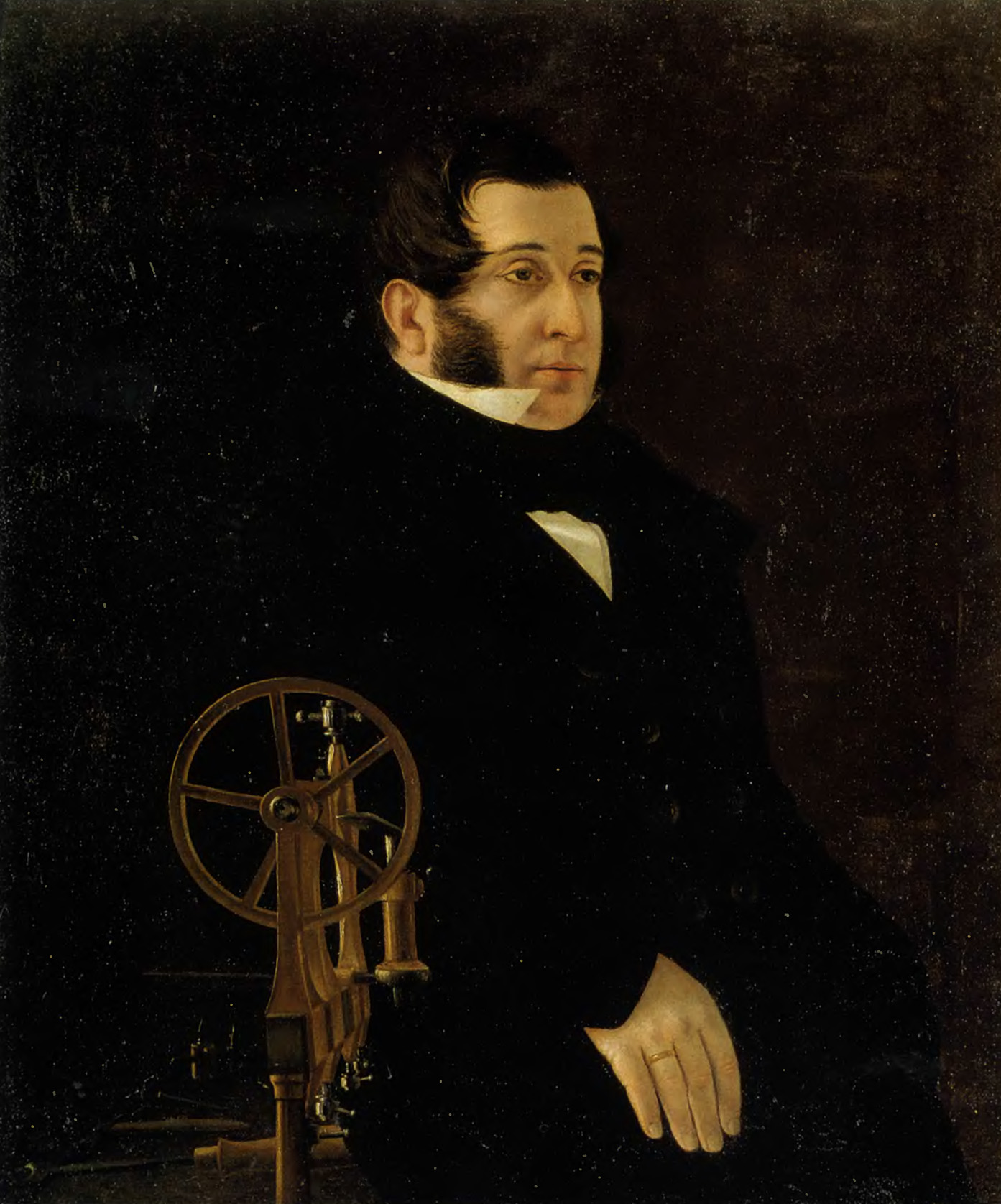
Wilibald Swibert Joseph Gottlieb von Besser, 1830's

- Adam Tanner (1572–1632) Jesuit professor of mathematics and philosophy, eponym of the Moon crater Tannerus
- Ferdinand Johann Adam von Pernau Count of Rosenau (1660–1731), Austrian ornithologist
- Johann Nepomuk von Laicharting (1754–1797), entomologist and Professor of Natural Science
- Wilibald Swibert Joseph Gottlieb von Besser (1784–1842), Austrian-born botanist, worked in Western Ukraine
- Philipp Sarlay (1826–1908), principal of telegraph office, technological and scientific pioneer
- Leopold Pfaundler (1839–1920), physicist and chemist, wrote the kinetic theory of gases
- Georg Luger (1849–1923), Austrian designer of the famous Luger pistol
- Erwin Payr (1871–1946), surgeon, eponym of Splenic-flexure syndrome or "Payr's disease"
- Meinhard von Pfaundler (1872–1947), pediatrician, interest in the diathetic aspects of disease
- Arnold Durig (1872–1961), Austrian physiologist, investigated organisms at high altitude
- Otto E. Neugebauer (1899–1990), Austrian-American mathematician and historian of science
- Bruno de Finetti (1906–1985), Italian probabilist, statistician and actuary, noted for the conception of probability
- Meinhard Michael Moser (1924–2002), mycologist of the taxonomy, chemistry and toxicity of the gilled mushrooms
- Klaus Biemann (1926–2016), professor of chemistry, the "father of organic mass spectrometry"
- Klaus Riedle (born 1941), German power engineering scientist, helped develop more efficient gas turbines for power generation
- Prof. Herbert Lochs (1946–2015), prominent German/Austrian medical doctor and scientist
- Peter Zoller (born 1952), theoretical physicist and Professor at the University of Innsbruck
- Wolfgang Scheffler (born 1956), inventor/promoter of large, flexible, parabolic reflecting dishes that concentrate sunlight for cooking and in the world's first solar-powered crematorium
- Christian Spielmann (born 1963), physicist and a professor at the University of Jena
- Veronika Sexl (born 1966), pharmacologist and toxicologist with interests in cancer research. Since 1 March 2023 she is rector of the University of Innsbruck.

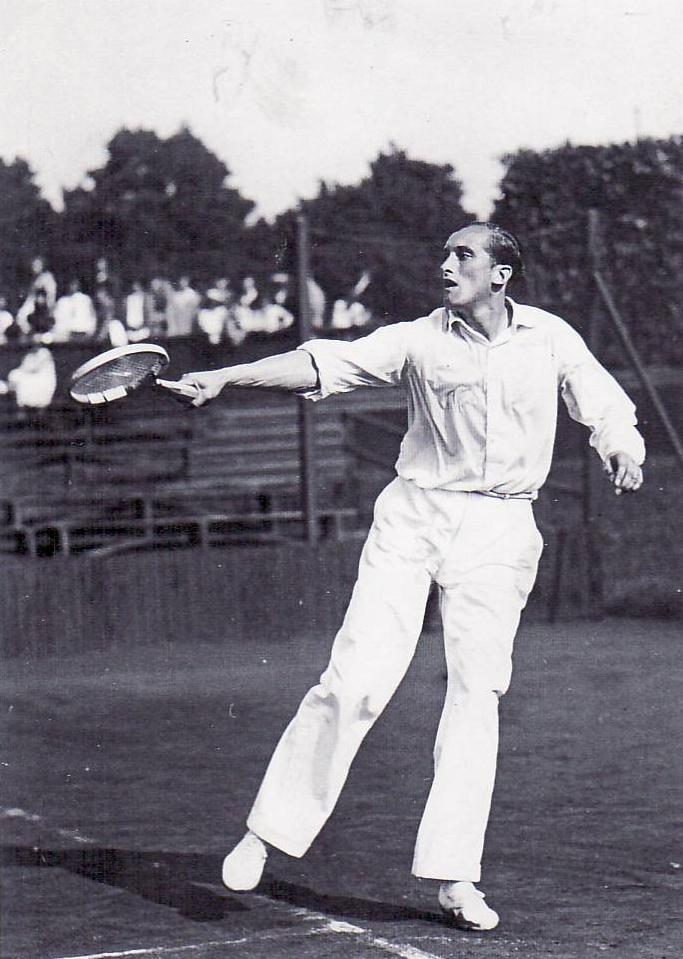
Roderich Menzel, 1934

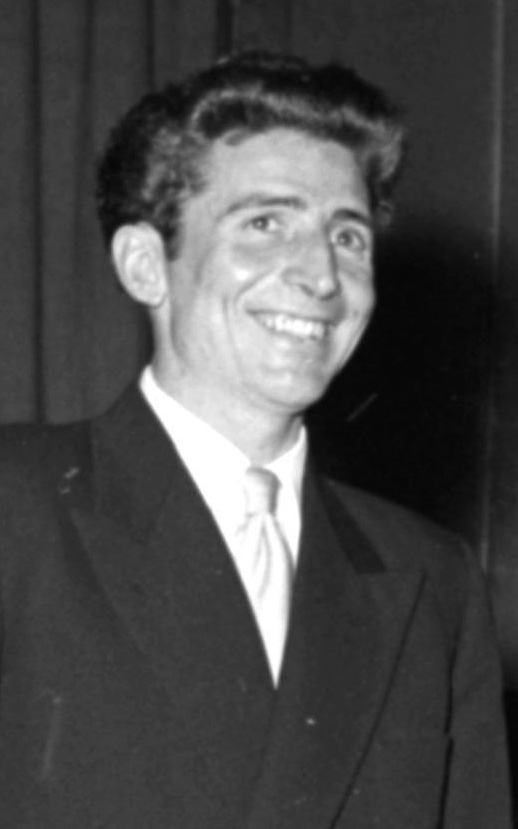
Hermann Buhl, 1953

=== Sport ===
- Hady Pfeiffer (1906–2002), Austrian/German alpine skier, competed 1936 Winter Olympics
- Roderich Menzel (1907–1987), amateur tennis player and, after his active career, an author
- Lotte Scheimpflug (1908–1997), Austrian/Italian luger, competed 1920s to the 1950s
- Gustav Lantschner (1910–2011), alpine skier & actor, competed 1936 Winter Olympics
- Erich Eliskases (1913–1997), chess grandmaster in the 1950s, represented Austria, Germany and Argentina
- Hermann Buhl (1924–1957), mountaineer, considered one of the best climbers of all time
- Egon Schöpf (born 1925), alpine skier, competed in the 1948 and 1952 Winter Olympics
- Dagmar Rom (1928–2022), former alpine ski racer, won two gold medals at the 1950 World Championships
- Walter Steinegger (1928-2022), former ski jumper who competed in the 1952 Winter Olympics
- Fritz Dinkhauser (born 1940), hammer thrower and bobsleigher at the 1968 Winter Olympics
- Gert Elsässer (born 1949), skeleton racer who competed in the early 1980s
- Franz Marx (born 1963), sport wrestler, qualified for the Summer Olympic Games in Barcelona
- Markus Prock (born 1964), luger who competed between 1983 and 2002
- Barbara Schett (born 1976), Austrian tennis player and sportscaster
- Fritz Dopfer (born 1987), World Cup alpine ski racer, specializing in the giant slalom and slalom
- David Lama (1990–2019), rock climber and mountaineer
- René Binder (born 1992), racing driver
- Nicol Ruprecht (born 1992), rhythmic gymnast
- Gregor Schlierenzauer (born 1990), ski jumper, all-time leader in the number of World Cup victories
- Jakob Schubert (born 1990), Austrian professional rock climber. He won bronze in both the 2020 and 2024 Summer Olympics
- Susanna Kurzthaler (born 1995), biathlete
- Vanessa Herzog (born 1995), speed skater
- Simon Bucher (born 2000), Austrian 2020 Olympic swimmer
- Marco Kasper (born 2004), ice hockey center

== International relations ==
=== Twin towns and sister cities ===
- Freiburg im Breisgau in Baden-Württemberg, Germany (since 1963)
- Grenoble in Isère, Auvergne-Rhône-Alpes, France (since 1963)
- Sarajevo in Bosnia and Herzegovina (since 1980)
- Aalborg in Denmark (since 1982)
- (Georgia (country)) Tbilisi in Georgia (since 1982)
- Ōmachi in Japan, (since 1985)
- New Orleans, Louisiana, United States (since 1995)

=== Partnerships ===
- Kraków in Lesser Poland Voivodeship, Poland (since 1998)

=== Austrian Service Abroad ===
The Austrian Service Abroad is a NGO, which provides positions for an alternative Austrian national service at 85 organizations in 35 countries worldwide in the sectors Holocaust Memorial Service, Social Service and Peace Service. It was founded by Andreas Maislinger and Andreas Hörtnagl in 1998 and is based in Innsbruck.

== See also ==
- Tyrol
- History of the Jews in Innsbruck
- Innsbruck, ich muss dich lassen
- Internationales Studentenhaus Innsbruck
- Innsbruck Tramway
- Music of Innsbruck
- Lohbach (Inn)
- Brenner Base Tunnel
