= Innsbrucker Mittelgebirgsbahn =

Narrow-gauge tram line in Innsbruck, Austria

The Innsbruck Mittelgebirgsbahn, colloquially also Mittelgebirgsbahn, Igler, Sechser or Waldstraßenbahn and marketed since June 2024 as the Waldbahn (“forest line”) – is the present-day Line 6 of the Innsbruck tramway. The 8.362 km-long metre gauge interurban tramway was originally licensed as a light railway. It serves the Paschberg, a wooded hill south-east of Innsbruck on the Tyrolean Upland (Tiroler Mittelgebirge), which gave the line its name. Opened in 1900, it has since linked the Innsbruck district of Wilten with the villages of Aldrans, Lans, Sistrans and Igls. Formerly an important means of local transport, it today also functions as an excursion line into a popular local recreation area. In earlier years services to and from Igls were repeatedly through-worked to the city centre. In June 2024 urban operation of Line 6 was resumed: it now runs hourly via Bergisel station through Museumsstraße to the Mühlauer Brücke terminus.

== History ==
=== Planning and construction ===
At the end of the 19th century the village of Igls in the Innsbruck uplands developed into a popular destination for tourists and a favourite excursion for the people of Innsbruck. However, only a steep country lane led from Innsbruck up to the plateau. As early as 1886 the first ideas emerged to build an electric narrow-gauge railway from Maria-Theresien-Straße via Wilten to Amras and to convey passengers from there to the plateau by cable car. Another plan of 1890 envisaged a rack railway from Innsbruck via Amras, Aldrans and Igls to the Patscherkofel.

In 1893 the Localbahn Innsbruck–Hall i. Tirol (L.B.I.H.i.T.) intended to extend its line from Bergisel station to Ambras Castle. Several variants were discussed for a continuation to Igls. One proposal ran from the castle via Vill and Lanser See to Igls; the other led via Lans and Sistrans to Igls. It soon became clear, however, that the first option would be too long and would not serve the other villages.

In early summer 1896 the city of Innsbruck received from the k.k. Eisenbahnministerium a one-year authorisation to carry out technical preparatory works for a minor narrow-gauge railway, to be worked either by steam or electricity, from Innsbruck via Ambras Castle, Ampass, Aldrans and Lans to Igls. The final route planning was undertaken by engineer Josef Riehl. It had already been decided that the line would merely pass through the municipal territory of Ampass without a halt there. To maintain the desired hourly timetable, Riehl also suggested that the line should not run through Aldrans but only skirt the village. Construction work on the trackbed began in August.

As the vehicles were to be stabled at the Bergisel station of the L.B.I.H.i.T., the engine shed there had to be extended. At Igls a locomotive shed was built, large enough for either one steam locomotive or two trailer cars. Igls station itself had two tracks, so that the locomotive could run round its train.

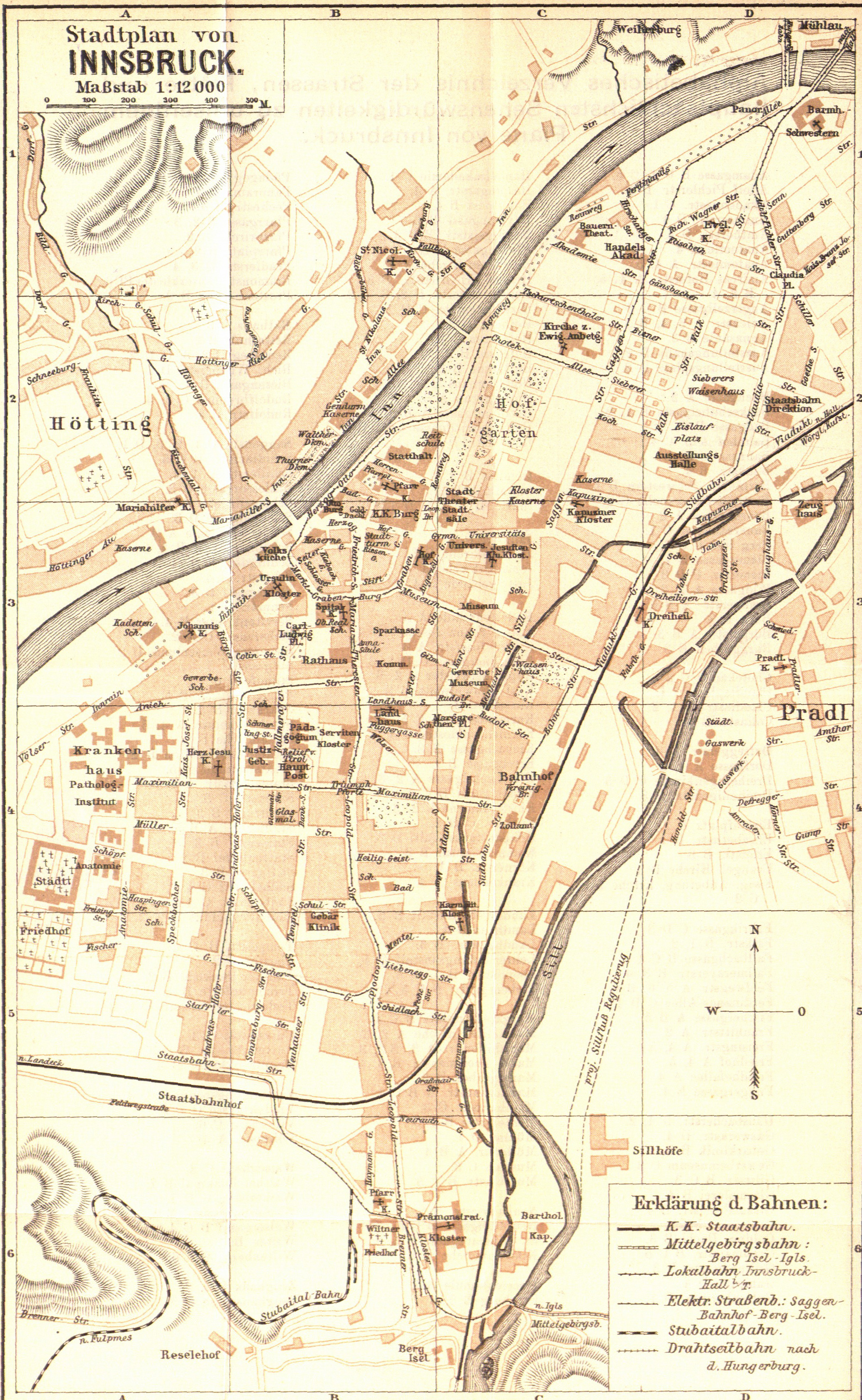
Plan of Innsbruck, c. 1910 (starting point Bergisel at the bottom).

In January 1900 the city of Innsbruck was granted the concession, after which construction work started immediately. The works proceeded smoothly, although the bridge over the River Sill was delivered late because workers at the manufacturing company were on strike. Engineer Riehl therefore had the temporary bridge strengthened so that operations could begin on time. The building work was completed in mid-June 1900.

The Innsbrucker Mittelgebirgsbahn company (I.M.B.) was wholly owned by the city of Innsbruck. Operation was entrusted to the L.B.I.H.i.T.

=== Operation ===
==== Steam operation (1900–1936) ====
===== Early years (1900–1914) =====
On 27 June 1900 the line was officially opened with an officiellen Eröffnungsfahrt (“official inaugural run”) from the town hall in Maria-Theresien-Straße to Igls in the afternoon, followed by a return trip from Igls to Innsbruck at 19:30. A major celebration was not planned. From the following day the line was opened to regular traffic. At that time the company had two steam locomotives, twelve trailer cars and four goods wagons. The line only operated in the summer half of the year, from early April to late September. In 1901 the halt of Teutoburgerwald was renamed Tantegert and a third steam locomotive was delivered.

The line quickly became well known. By 1902 it is documented that passengers of the North German Lloyd shipping company received a 30 % discount on tickets, illustrating the railway's wide reputation. Because the sleepers on the Mittelgebirgsbahn were not impregnated, the first sleepers had to be replaced as early as 1903 as they had already become badly rotten. As freight traffic steadily increased, a third covered goods wagon was ordered in 1904. In early July 1906 luggage and freight items up to 100 kg were carried experimentally in a dedicated goods service to Igls. From 1912 winter sports trains to Igls were introduced at weekends and on public holidays.

===== First World War (1914–1918) =====
During the First World War, locomotives 2 and 3 of the Mittelgebirgsbahn were temporarily hired out in 1915 to the Trento–Malè railway because of a shortage of spare parts for the DC multiple units there. When the military high command moved from South Tyrol to Igls in 1916, traffic on the Mittelgebirgsbahn increased so much that even a trailer car had to be released for goods traffic. At the end of 1918 locomotive 3 was again hired to the Trento–Malè railway, where it was scrapped after the war.

===== Post-war years (1918–1930) =====
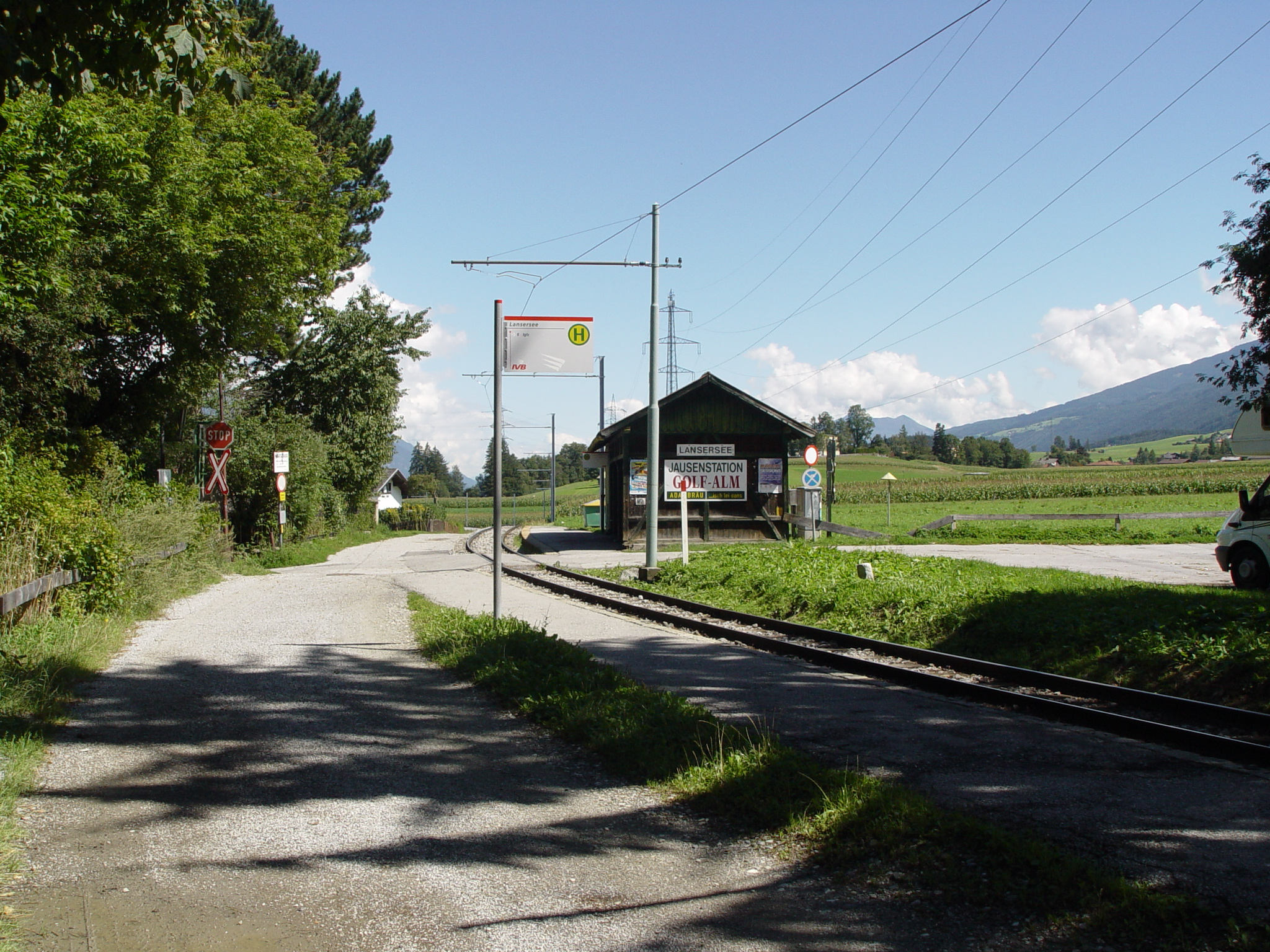
Lanser See halt

After the war operations on the Mittelgebirgsbahn had to be curtailed because of the acute shortage of coal in Austria. Surplus trailer cars were loaned to the L.B.I.H.i.T., which by then was already electrified and suffered from a shortage of cars. In 1920 the section as far as the Sill bridge was electrified so that snow-clearing trains from the city could unload their loads there. In 1921 peat extraction began in the Viller Moor, for which a short branch line was built.

From 1923 winter sports trains again ran at weekends, and in addition the Mittelgebirgsbahn services were extended into Maria-Theresien-Straße. Some trailer cars were fitted with solenoid brakes and electric lighting for this purpose. These trailers were hauled by a city tram motor car from Maria-Theresien-Straße to Bergisel station, where passengers transferred to the waiting steam train to Igls. In March 1927 the L.B.I.H.i.T. purchased the I.M.B. retroactively with effect from 1 January, in order to better withstand growing competition from motor vehicles. Full electrification of the route was also considered. In 1927 the line achieved its greatest logistical feat when it transported the 150-tonne carrying cable of the Patscherkofel cable car to Igls. In mid-1928 the halt at the Mühlsee, a popular bathing lake, was opened.

===== Preparations for electrification (1930–1936) =====
In mid-1933 a trial run was made on the Stubai Valley Railway with the Haller motor car no. 4, which had been uprated with four traction motors, to test its suitability for steep gradients. Electrification was still postponed, however, because competition from bus operators had become very strong. By 1935 the funds were finally secured, and another L.B.I.H.i.T. motor car (no. 3) was rebuilt for operation on hilly routes. AEG was entrusted with planning the electrification. As on the line to Hall, a system voltage of 1000 V DC was chosen, with power fed in at Innsbruck from the Sill canal. Work on the overhead line began in early 1936. The structure gauge of the Amras tunnel had to be enlarged. Because significant voltage drops were expected, an additional feeder cable was laid through the forest, connecting to the overhead line at Tantegert and at Lans halt. The conversion work was completed by mid-1936.

==== Electric operation (since 1936) ====
===== End of the steam era (1936–1939) =====
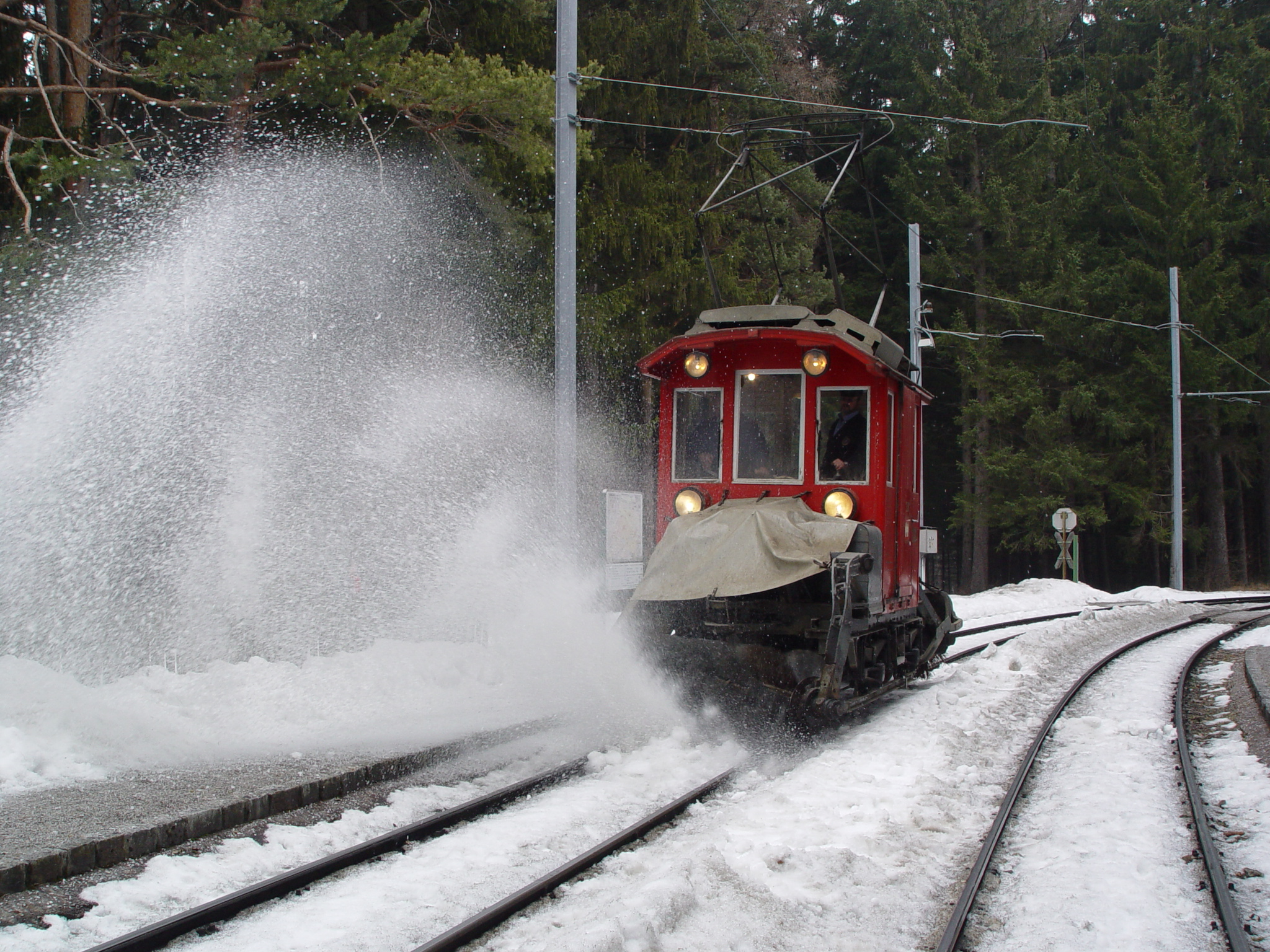
Snow blower no. 200 in use on the Igler

On 28 June 1936 electric operation could finally begin on the Mittelgebirgsbahn. The line was integrated into the urban network as Line 6, and almost all services now ran through to the city centre. Passengers therefore no longer had to change at Bergisel.

Gradually all remaining trailer cars were converted for electric operation. Journey time dropped to a little over 20 minutes. After the July Agreement of 11 July 1936, the Thousand-mark ban on travel to Austria was lifted and passenger numbers rose sharply. Retired tram drivers had to be re-engaged and another motor car (no. 2) was equipped with four new motors. Because fuel became scarce during the war, the railway soon regained a transport monopoly on the route to Igls. In 1939 the two remaining steam locomotives were sold, as electric operation on the mountain line had proved itself. This marked the final end of steam traction on the metre-gauge lines around Innsbruck.

Despite its formal status as a tramway, the Mittelgebirgsbahn was listed in the Reichs-Kursbuch timetable of 1944/45 as an electrisch betriebene Schmalspurbahn (“electrically operated narrow-gauge railway”), whereas the summer timetable of 1939 merely noted Elektrischer Betrieb (“electric operation”).

===== Second World War and growth in demand (1939–1945) =====
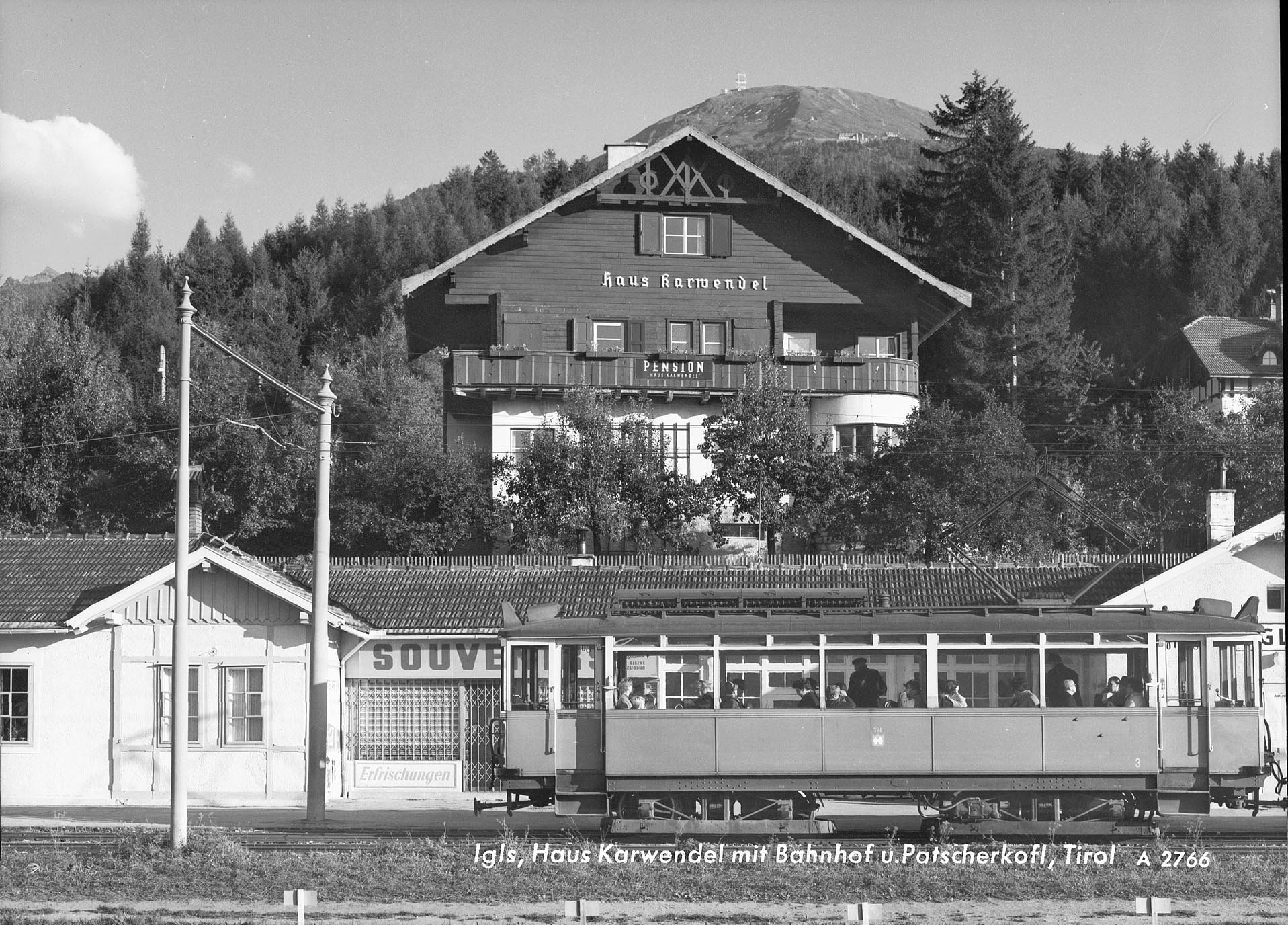
Motor car in Igls, 1962

In July 1939 an uphill train derailed just below Tantegert due to a prank by local youths. In December 1940 a serious collision between two trains in the curve below Tantegert caused many injuries: the downhill train had received orders to cross at Bergisel station, while the uphill train was instructed to cross at Tantegert. Both motor cars were temporarily out of service, so that only a 60-minute interval service was possible. At the same time services from the Igler line to the city centre had to be suspended. A few weeks later there was another accident on the Hall line, leaving the local railway company with only five of its eight interurban motor cars.

To prevent such accidents in future, a staff system was introduced, which remained in use until 1983. It consisted of a blue and a yellow staff. A train could only occupy the section between Bergisel and Tantegert when it carried the yellow staff, and only the section between Tantegert and Igls when it carried the blue staff. At the crossing in Tantegert the staffs were exchanged, so that no train was ever permitted to enter a section still occupied by the opposite working.

By 1941 two further Hall motor cars (nos. 7 and 8) had been equipped with the spare motors from cars 2 and 3, giving them four motors and allowing them to be used on the Igler line in times of car shortage. That year also saw track realignments and the merger of the L.B.I.H.i.T. with several bus companies to form the Innsbrucker Verkehrsbetriebe (IVB). During the Second World War the Mittelgebirgsbahn suffered heavy damage from bomb attacks owing to its proximity to the Brenner Railway. On one occasion the electricity supply to Bergisel station was cut, preventing trams from reaching the terminus. Sections of line near the station were repeatedly damaged, meaning that services often had to terminate at the Sill bridge. After the end of the war repairs began at once and trams again ran through to the city centre.

===== Competition from buses (1945–1977) =====
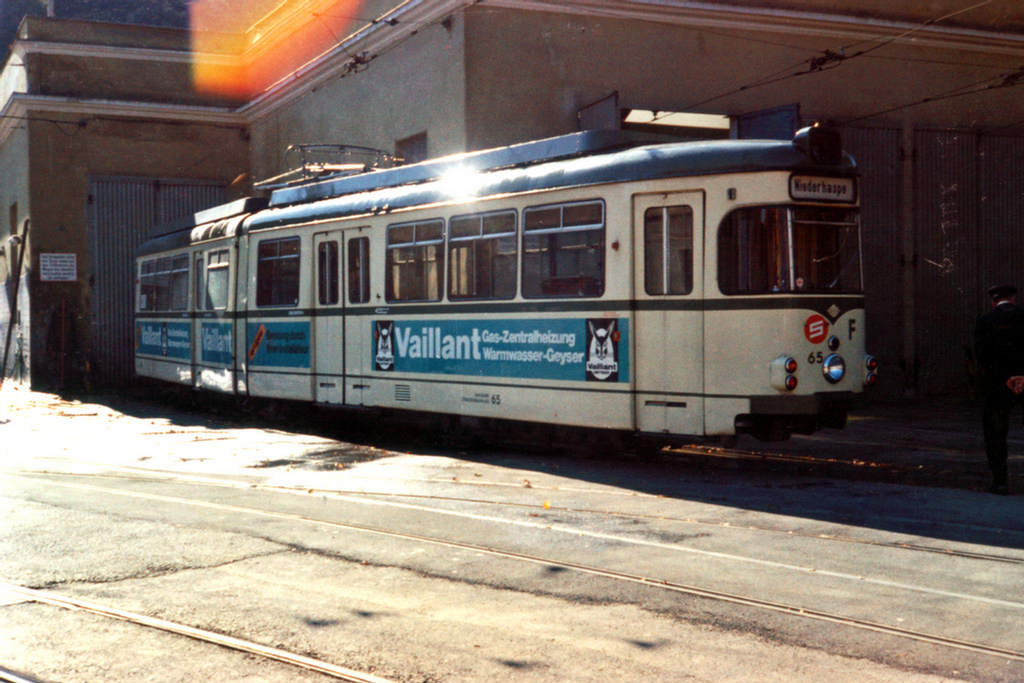
Car shortly after delivery in 1976 at the old Bergisel station, still in Hagen livery and with six axles

In 1948 the Innsbruck transport operator introduced a bus service to Igls, which took many passengers away from the Mittelgebirgsbahn. The bus had the advantage of serving the village centres directly, unlike the railway. Over the next 20 years there were repeated track realignments on the Mittelgebirgsbahn, which improved ride comfort and speed and reduced wear. In the early 1970s Line 6 faced closure because of the construction of the Inn Valley Autobahn, which was to cross the Sill at the point where the tramway crossed and then cut through the depot. A public consultation, however, saw local people vote against closure. In 1974 the Hall line was abandoned and five of its eight motor cars were sold, leaving the Mittelgebirgsbahn with only a small fleet. In 1976 the line again came under threat of closure, this time to be replaced by modern gas-powered buses. Public opposition once more prevented closure.

===== Introduction of modern articulated cars (1977–1981) =====
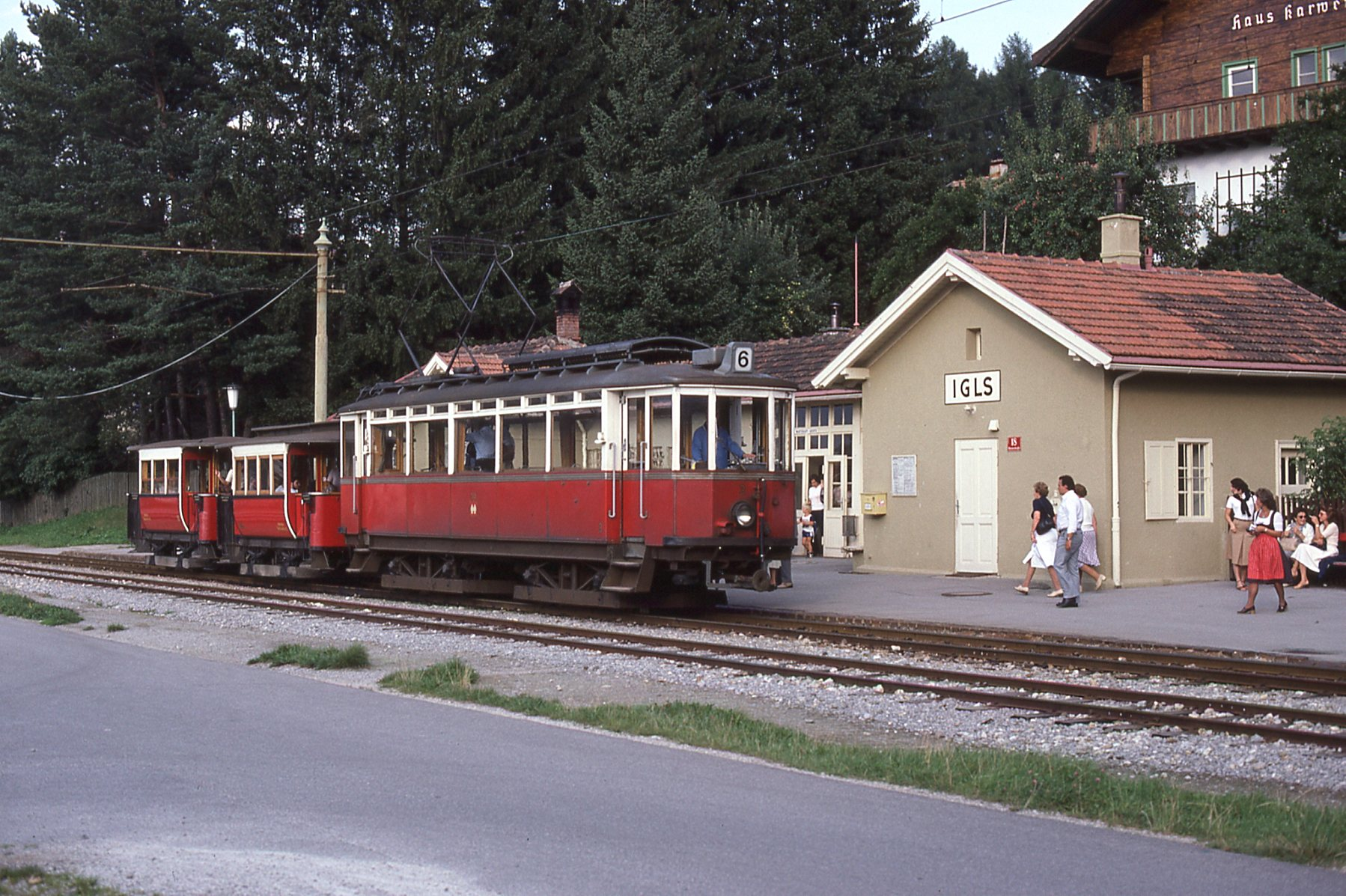
1977: an older multiple unit of the Mittelgebirgsbahn arriving at Igls

In 1977 the Inn Valley Autobahn was finally built, forcing the tramway to be diverted at the Sill bridge. The old bridge was removed and replaced by a new structure. The course of the Igler Straße was shifted, and the tram now passes underneath it. The Innsbruck operator also carried out trial runs as far as Tantegert with modern articulated trams purchased in 1976 from the Hagen tramway. By 1979 the first ex-Hagen car had been adapted for mountain operation. In 1980 the articulated cars were lengthened by inserting middle sections taken from second-hand Bielefeld cars. In February 1981 the then 72-year-old wooden bodied cars could be withdrawn from regular service and were retained only as works cars. Line voltage on the route was reduced to 850 V, as the new cars did not require the higher voltage. The now redundant locomotive shed at Igls was demolished.

===== Adaptation for single-ended operation (1981–1987) =====
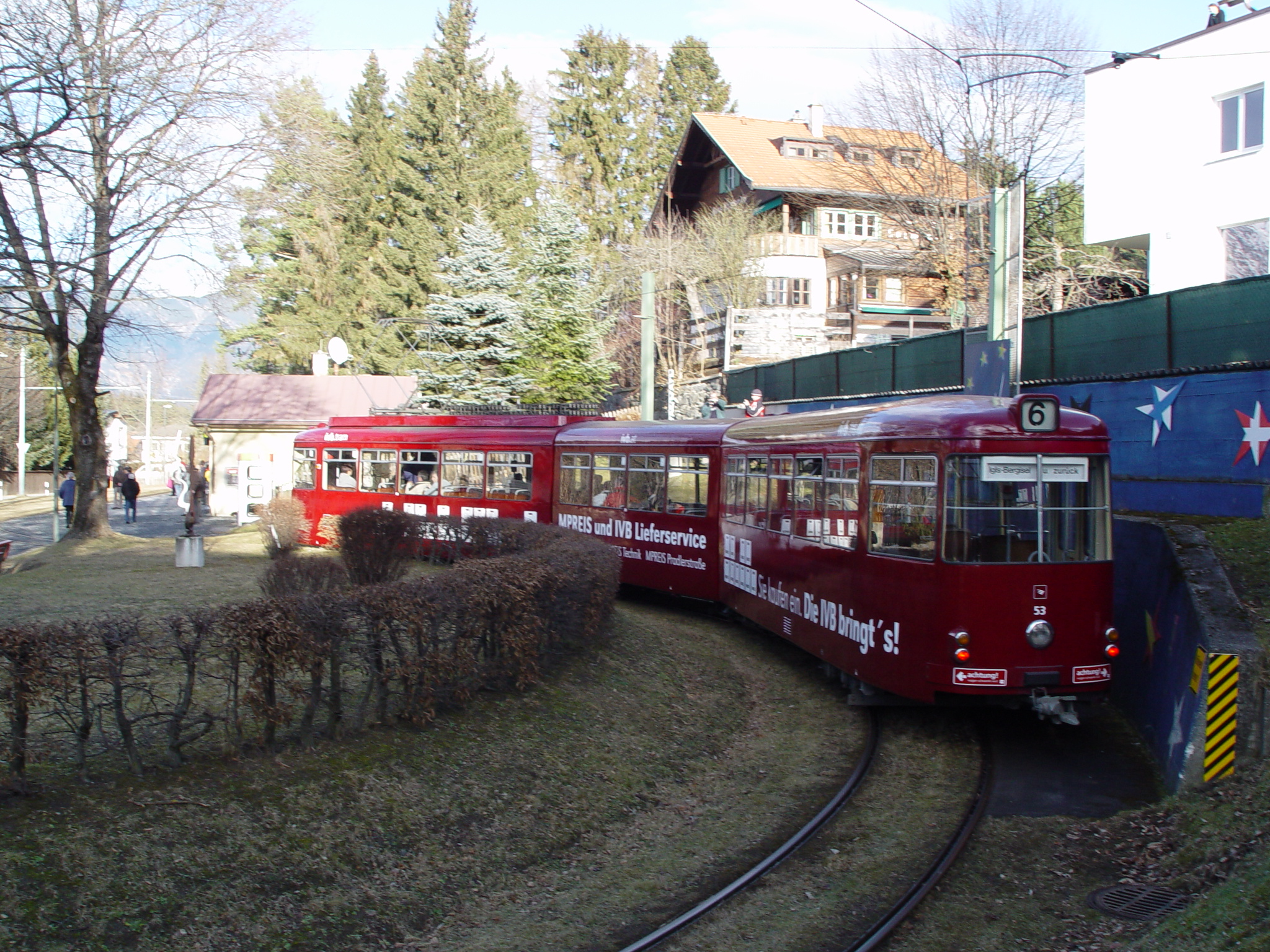
Tramcar in the Igls balloon loop

From 1983 the former Hagen articulated cars were also deployed on the Stubai Valley Railway. However, there were too few vehicles to operate both routes efficiently. The purchase of additional cars of similar quality was not financially feasible at the time. It was therefore decided to work the Igler using existing single-ended cars acquired from the Bielefeld tramway. Their introduction was delayed until 1985 while the necessary adaptations were carried out. Platforms had to be provided on both sides of the track at all stops. At Igls a balloon loop was built and a new substation installed for 600 V operation, as the ex-Bielefeld cars did not tolerate higher voltages. In 1983 the old staff system was replaced by a modern radio-based control system. After completion of the loop at Igls in 1985, the Mittelgebirgsbahn could be converted to single-ended operation. Another substation was built at Aldrans. The Tummelplatz halt, formerly only served on All Saints' Day, and known until May 1992 as Tummelplatz – Schloß Ambras, has been served by regular services since 1985. The single-ended cars were also adapted for operation on the steep gradient.

===== Line 1 integration and heritage services (1987–1997) =====
From 1987 the Igler line was again through-routed into the city centre, as it had been in earlier years. New, however, was the extension to the lower terminus of the Hungerburgbahn in the Saggen district: the former radial route thus became a diameter line. Line 6 was integrated into the timetable of Line 1; for each journey of Line 6 to or from the Hungerburgbahn a journey of Line 1 was omitted. In net terms the number of services remained the same, since two diagrams were now deployed on Line 6. In the direction of Igls these “combined diagrams” were already shown as Line 6 from the Hungerburg terminus; in the opposite direction the tram ran as Line 1 back to the Hungerburgbahn. The linkage did not prove a success: despite the removal of the change of tram at Bergisel, passenger numbers on the Igler continued to fall. In October 1996 the Innsbruck operator therefore applied to close the line.

===== New operating pattern and heritage traffic (1997–2000) =====
After local people again opposed closure, the IVB changed the routeing of Line 6 in 1997 and removed its timetable linkage with Line 1. Line 6 continued to serve the city centre in addition to Line 1, but now only in the summer timetable period and only as far as the city centre, not to the Hungerburgbahn. In winter the Igler once again operated only between Bergisel and Igls, as it had done until 1987. To make the “new” line more attractive, the Tiroler Museumsbahnen (Tyrolean Museum Railways, TMB) also began running a scheduled weekly heritage service to Igls in summer from 1996. In the following years until 2004 these heritage trips, running even daily at times for capacity reasons, consisted of an Igler motor car, two Igler trailers and Stubai goods wagon no. 32 for bicycle transport.

===== Planned low-floor operation (2000–2008) =====
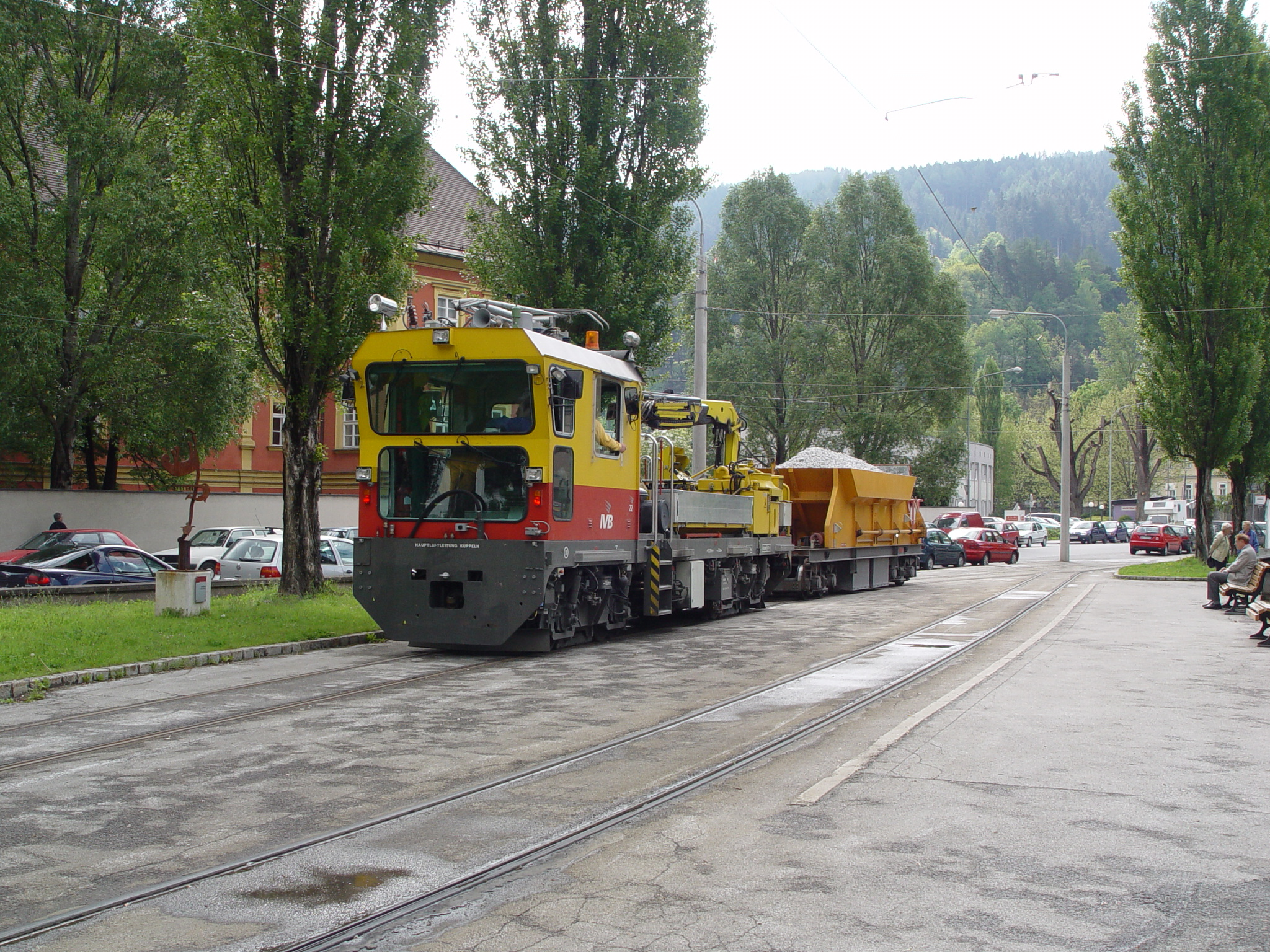
Work train with ballast at the “new” Bergisel station

In 2000 the IVB decided, as part of the regional tramway concept, to modernise Line 6 once more and to operate it in future with modern low-floor vehicles. In 2003 a trial run was therefore carried out with a borrowed low-floor tram of the Flexity Outlook type as far as just short of Lans stop; the stop itself could not be passed because the tram required a larger loading gauge. In summer 2005 services on Line 6 were, for the first time since 1987, cut back from the city centre to run only between Bergisel and Igls owing to preparatory works for the regional tramway project. The heritage services on the Igler, operated regularly since 1996, also ceased in 2005 and have not been resumed. In 2006 the ballast on the rural section was re-tamped in preparation for the planned introduction of the new low-floor trams.

On 29 July 2008 severe storm damage occurred on Line 6. Between Lans/Sistrans and Lanser See the embankment was washed away. At the hairpin curve above Tantegert falling trees tore down the overhead line, and at Schönruh earth movements above the track and movement of the retaining wall were observed. The line was therefore closed for several months. The overhead line damage was repaired within a few days and, despite problems with the unstable ground, the embankment near Lans was rebuilt within two weeks. For the damage near Schönruh a geologist appointed by the Tyrolean provincial government first had to prepare a report; following this, parts of the rockface were removed and both the retaining wall and the rocks were stabilised with concrete injections. The closure was also used to carry out other works, such as sleeper renewal near Mühlsee and refurbishment of several platform islands. The line was formally reopened on 7 November 2008. Since early March 2009 the halts on the Mittelgebirgsbahn have been rebuilt one side at a time to allow level boarding of the new low-floor trams. As the new vehicles are two-ended, the second platform face at each stop (apart from Tantegert) is being taken out of use.

===== Low-floor operation (since 2009) =====
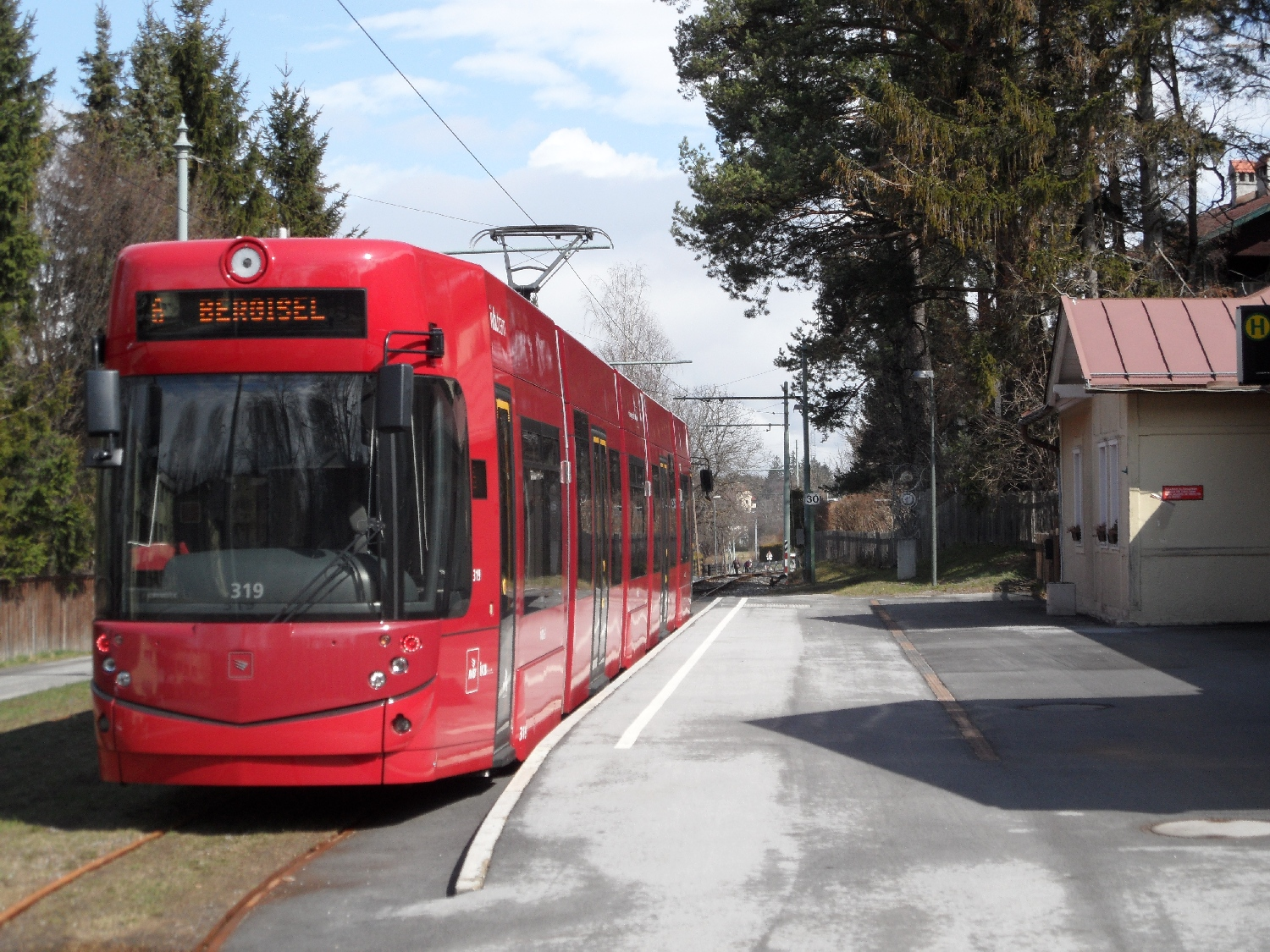
Low-floor tram 319 at Igls terminus, 2012

Since mid-July 2009 the line has been operated by low-floor trams. For this, the transformer in the Aldrans substation was replaced so that the nominal voltage could be raised to 900 V (from 600 V previously); otherwise, when several motor cars were operating on the gradient, the voltage would have dropped too much. To reduce wheel wear on the low-floor cars and to minimise noise at the Igls terminus, the balloon loop at Igls is no longer used in regular service. Instead, trams now run straight into the terminal platform and the driver changes ends. The loop remains available for special workings. The station buffet at Igls has been closed since February 2011.

Originally it was planned to restore Igls station building to its original 1900 appearance, but the original plans were no longer available. In agreement with the monuments office it was therefore decided in 2011 to restore the building to its last historic condition. Since then the former bistro in the station building has remained empty. In 2012 rails, sleepers and individual overhead masts were renewed on longer stretches of the line. At the end of 2012 the listed shelter at Lanser See halt was refurbished.

Since 15 April 2013 downhill bicycles have no longer been carried on the line. In the preceding years the Paschberg had developed into a popular downhill area. Because some downhill riders also used private land and caused damage, the city of Innsbruck ordered a ban on the carriage of downhill bicycles, which led to protests from riders. Tram operations were also affected by the downhill activities: some trains were heavily soiled and carried more bicycles than permitted, ramps were built across the tracks and parts of the line were used as downhill track.

Because the new vehicles caused severe rail wear, rails in curves and a large proportion of the sleepers between Tantegert and Lanser See were renewed between July and October 2013 and again in 2014. During these works the line was closed and replaced by bus services.

===== Restricted operation (2017–2024) =====
Because the line operates at a financial loss, various future scenarios have been discussed again since early 2016, including complete closure and operation only in the summer months May–October, even though the line had recently been modernised at a cost of several million euros.

Because of general refurbishment of the Sill bridge (Trienter Brücke) in connection with construction of the Brenner Base Tunnel, the line was replaced by buses for six months between February and August 2017. Services resumed on 5 August 2017.

Plans for restricted operation were firmed up in summer 2017.

===== “Waldstraßenbahn” (since 2022) =====
Since 2022 the line has been marketed as the “Waldstraßenbahn” (“forest tramway”). After a six-year idea-finding process in a working group involving Innsbruck city politicians, the Igls district committee and the IVB, it was decided to reintroduce through services to the city and to expand the timetable. The decision was made in mid-2023 but could not be implemented immediately, as two turnouts had to be replaced and new electric point motors and interlockings procured. Delivery delays for the point control equipment until 2024 meant that, with the timetable change in December 2023, only the hourly interval throughout the day could initially be reintroduced. From 14 June 2024 the through service into the city is to be introduced and Line 6 integrated into Line 1, with one journey per hour of Line 1 no longer terminating at Bergisel but continuing as Line 6 to Igls. Train crossings will take place on Line 1 within the city tram network.

=== Later planning and project studies ===
There have been occasional proposals to bring the railway closer to the centres of Aldrans, Lans and Igls. As early as the 1950s the land acquisition had been prepared for an extension of the Igler from Igls station into the village centre, around 500 m away. The route extension still appears in the zoning plan for the district of Igls. In the 1980s the University of Innsbruck drew up a study on rerouting the line and examined several variants. A key aim was to serve the area around the Igls Badhaus, about 100 m higher up, to provide a high-quality public transport link to the planned (and now built) lower terminus of the Olympiaexpress chairlift to the Patscherkofel. In addition, architect Hubert Prachensky prepared a “Metro Alpin” study for a tunnel railway under the Paschberg as a replacement for the Igler.

== Route ==
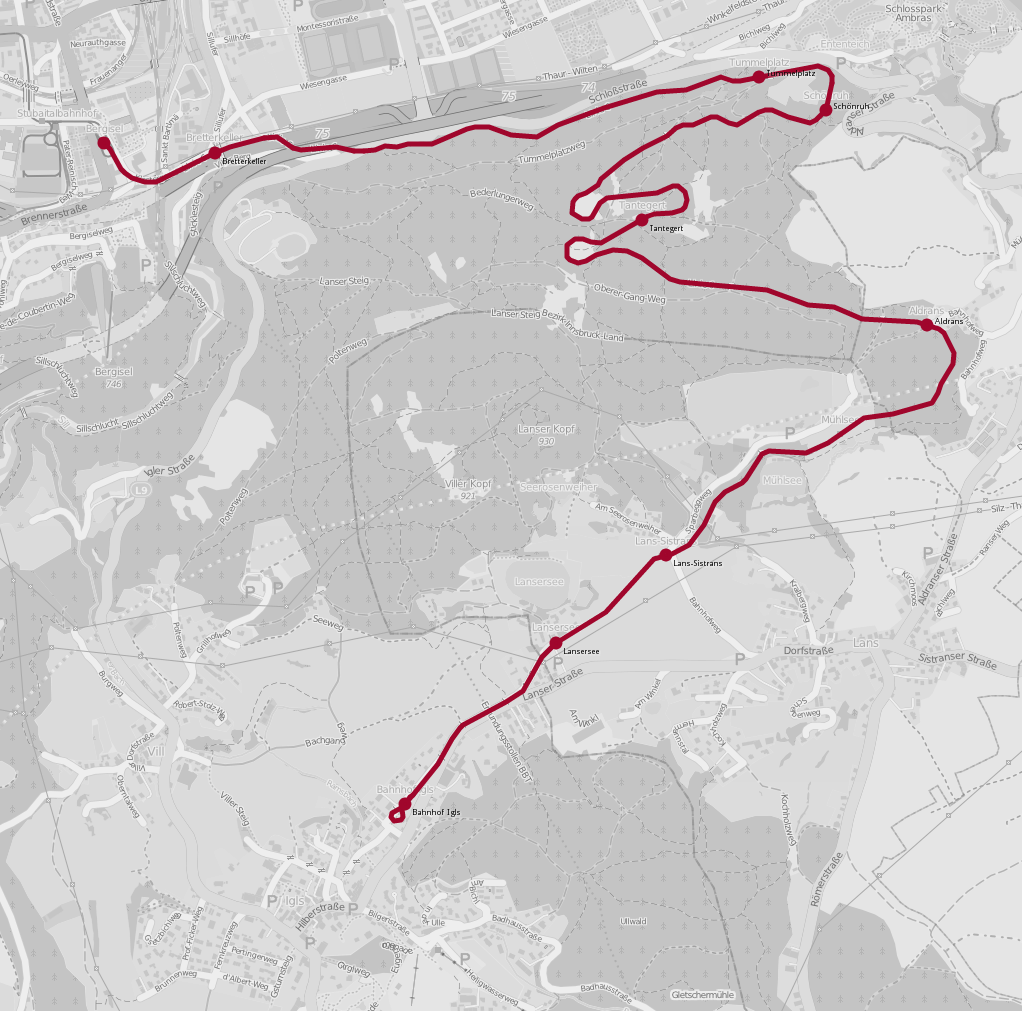
Route of the Innsbruck Mittelgebirgsbahn

In Innsbruck the line begins at the so-called Bergisel station, where the motor car from Igls reverses direction. This was formerly the depot of the Localbahn Innsbruck–Hall in Tirol, accommodating both the Mittelgebirgsbahn and the city trams. Today the former station, now converted to a tram stop, still has three tracks: two towards Igls and the balloon loop of Line 1.

Leaving Bergisel station, the line first passes the platform at which trams from Igls formerly stopped before continuing into the city. In a long curve the line passes the Kulturgasthaus Bierstindl, passes under the Brenner Railway (including the future junction with the Brenner Base Tunnel), crosses the Sill alongside the Inn Valley Autobahn and reaches Bretterkeller halt. A footbridge leads from here to the inn of the same name. From this point the line begins to climb. After a short distance the tram crosses the Inn Valley Autobahn and passes under the Brenner Autobahn. After passing beneath the Igler Straße the line enters the Paschberg forest. The insulators of the feeder cable fixings can be seen in the underpass. A relatively long section with gentle curves follows, giving occasional views through the trees over Innsbruck. From Tummelplatz halt, the Ambras Castle and the Tyrolean war memorial cemetery (Landessöhne-Gedächtnisfriedhof) can be reached on foot within a few minutes. This is also the starting point for the “Forstmeile”, a popular fitness trail with gymnastic stations.

In a long curve the line passes through its only tunnel and reaches Schönruh halt. The relatively spacious, level and straight alignment is structurally laid out for a passing loop originally planned here. Schönruh once had a listed shelter that had changed little since 1900 but was destroyed by fire in about mid-May 2007. As the halt was moved slightly downhill during conversion for low-floor trams, there is no longer any need to rebuild the shelter. The curve then continues as the line swings westwards. The cemetery can be seen between the trees up to the next major curve. Footpaths repeatedly cross the tramway. After around ten minutes from Bergisel and another curve, the passing loop at Tantegert is reached. Formerly trains crossed here every 30 minutes. At the edge of the loop stands a former crossing keeper's cottage, now used as a weekend house. Beyond the next curve follows a relatively long straight section, where the line was straightened over the years to reduce journey time. After several curves Aldrans halt is reached. Its shelter was modernised when the converter station was installed. After a long curve and some sweeping bends the tram leaves the forest and arrives at Mühlsee halt. Despite some refurbishment, the shelter at this stop has largely preserved its original appearance; a passing loop was also planned here.

Climbing further, the line reaches Lans–Sistrans halt on the Paschberg plateau after a few more curves. The shelter here was replaced by a concrete structure in the 1980s. In a long curve the tram then runs to Lanser See halt. In summer many passengers alight here to walk to the bathing lake or hike over the Paschberg back to Innsbruck. Despite some modifications, the shelter has retained much of its original character. A few minutes later the terminus at Igls is reached, where the original 1900 station building still stands. The balloon loop was formerly used in an anti-clockwise direction. Today the tram reverses direction and stops in front of the station building next to the waiting room. Only heritage and works trains occasionally use the loop. A short walk leads from here to the centre of Igls, and another five minutes further on is the lower station of the Patscherkofelbahn cable car.

Given its alignment and the fact that the line was formerly only operated in summer, the Mittelgebirgsbahn has retained the character of an excursion railway. By contrast, most commuters from Igls use the bus to travel to Innsbruck. Tourists and day-trippers favour the tram, particularly because of its proximity to Ambras Castle and the walking trails of the Paschberg. The leisure character of the line is enhanced by the possibility of bicycle transport introduced in 1996, which contributed to increased passenger numbers.

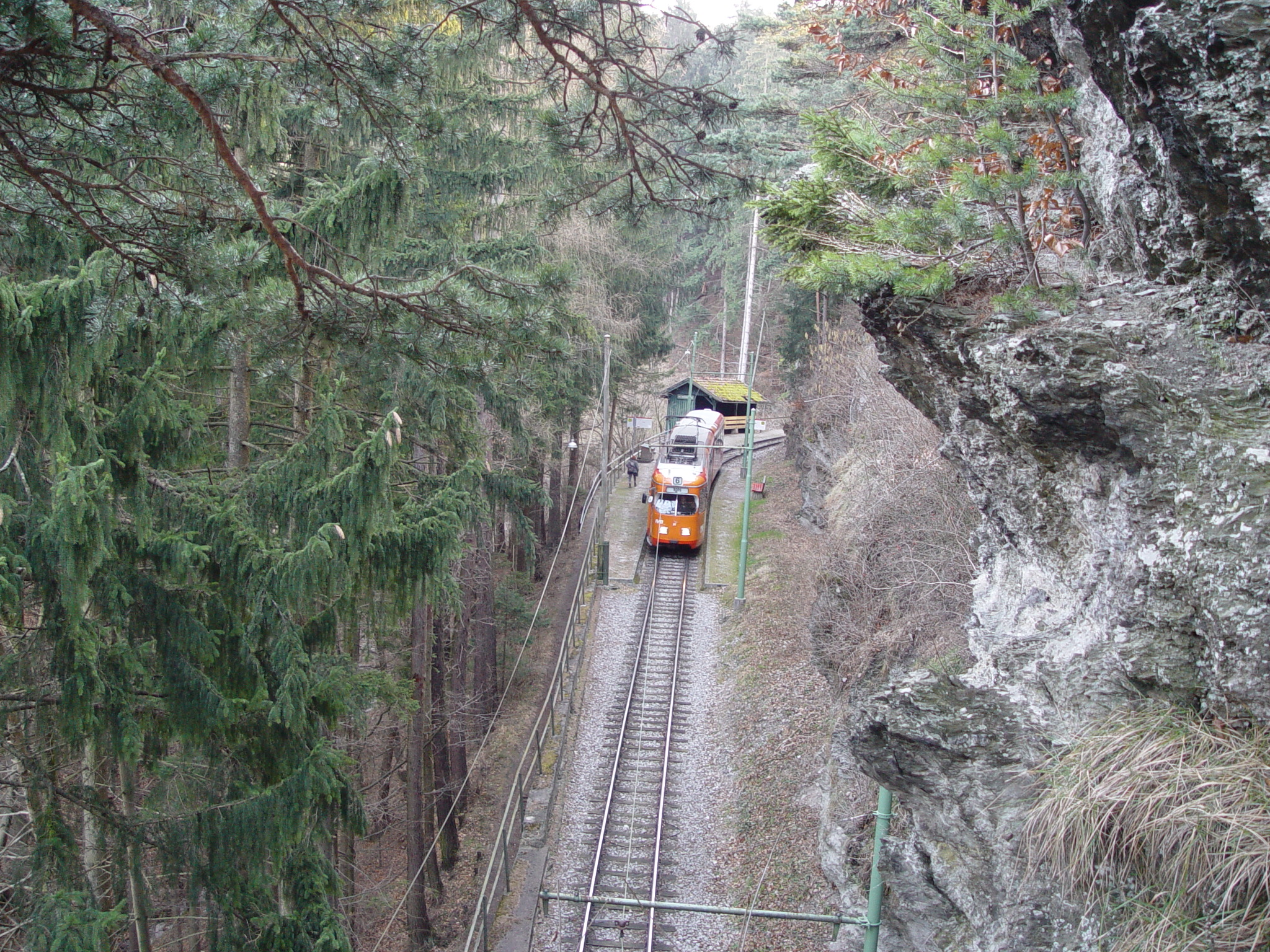
Former Bielefeld motor car 51 at Schönruh halt

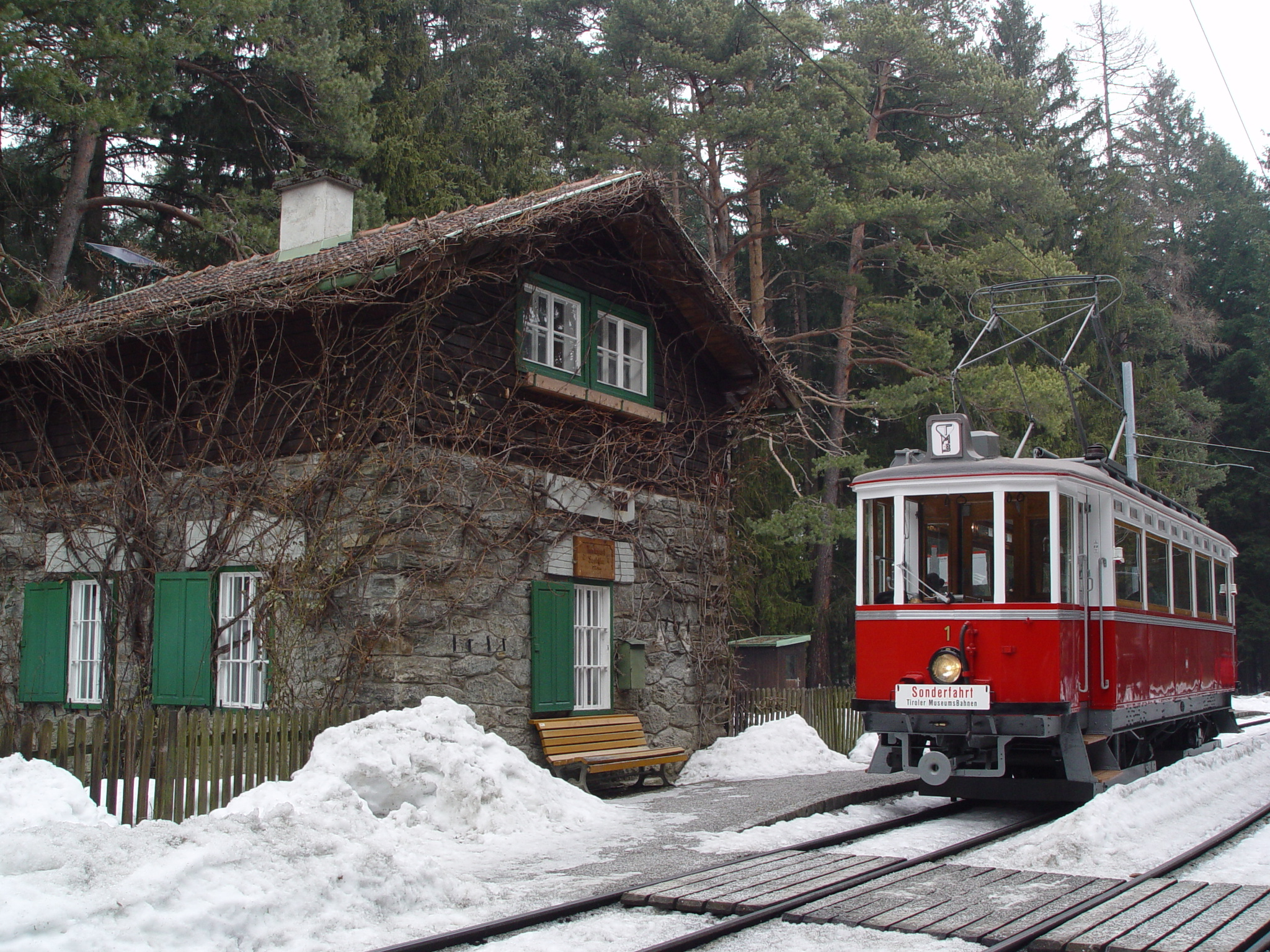
Tantegert in winter with Haller motor car no. 1

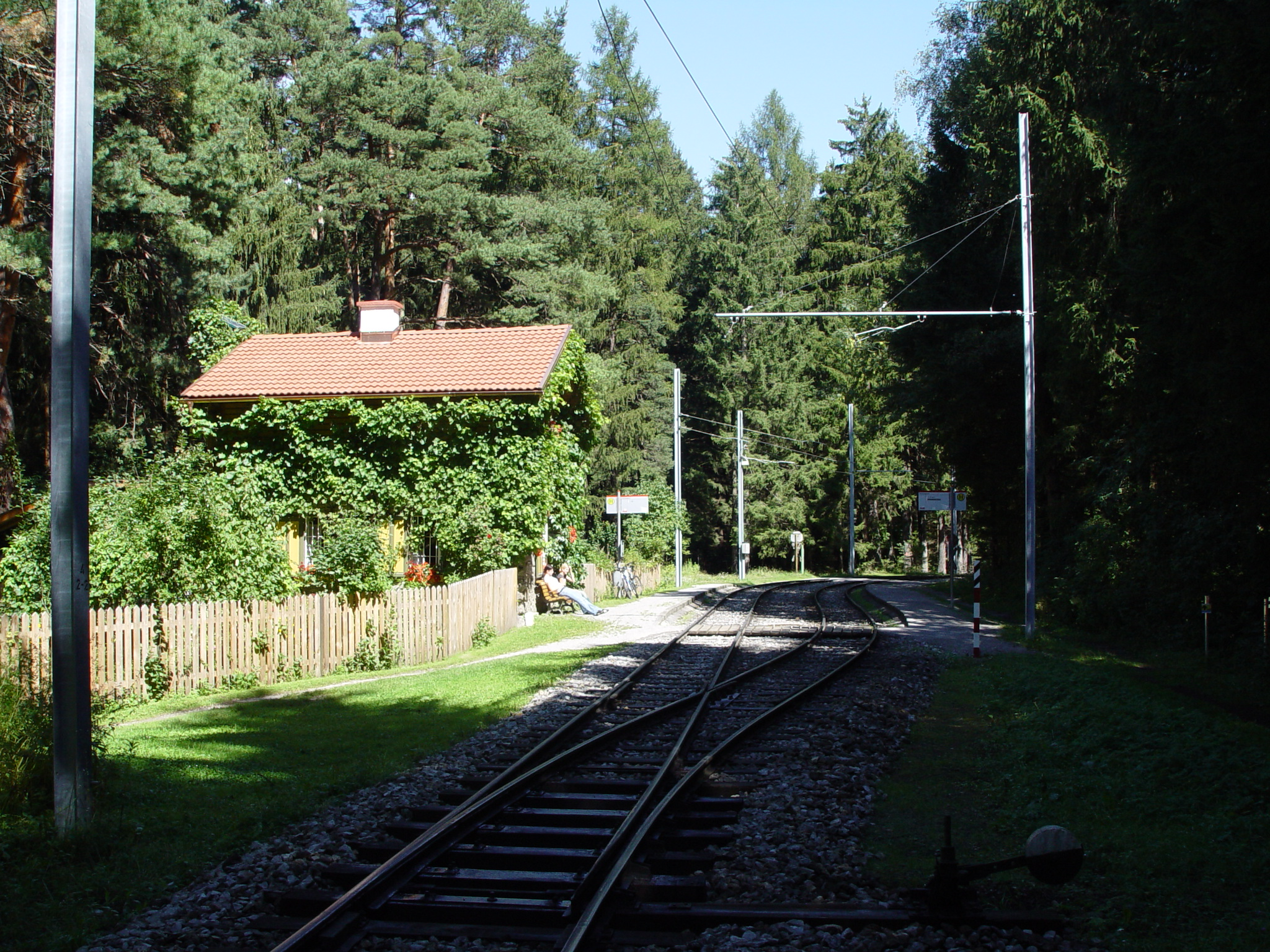
Tantegert passing loop in summer

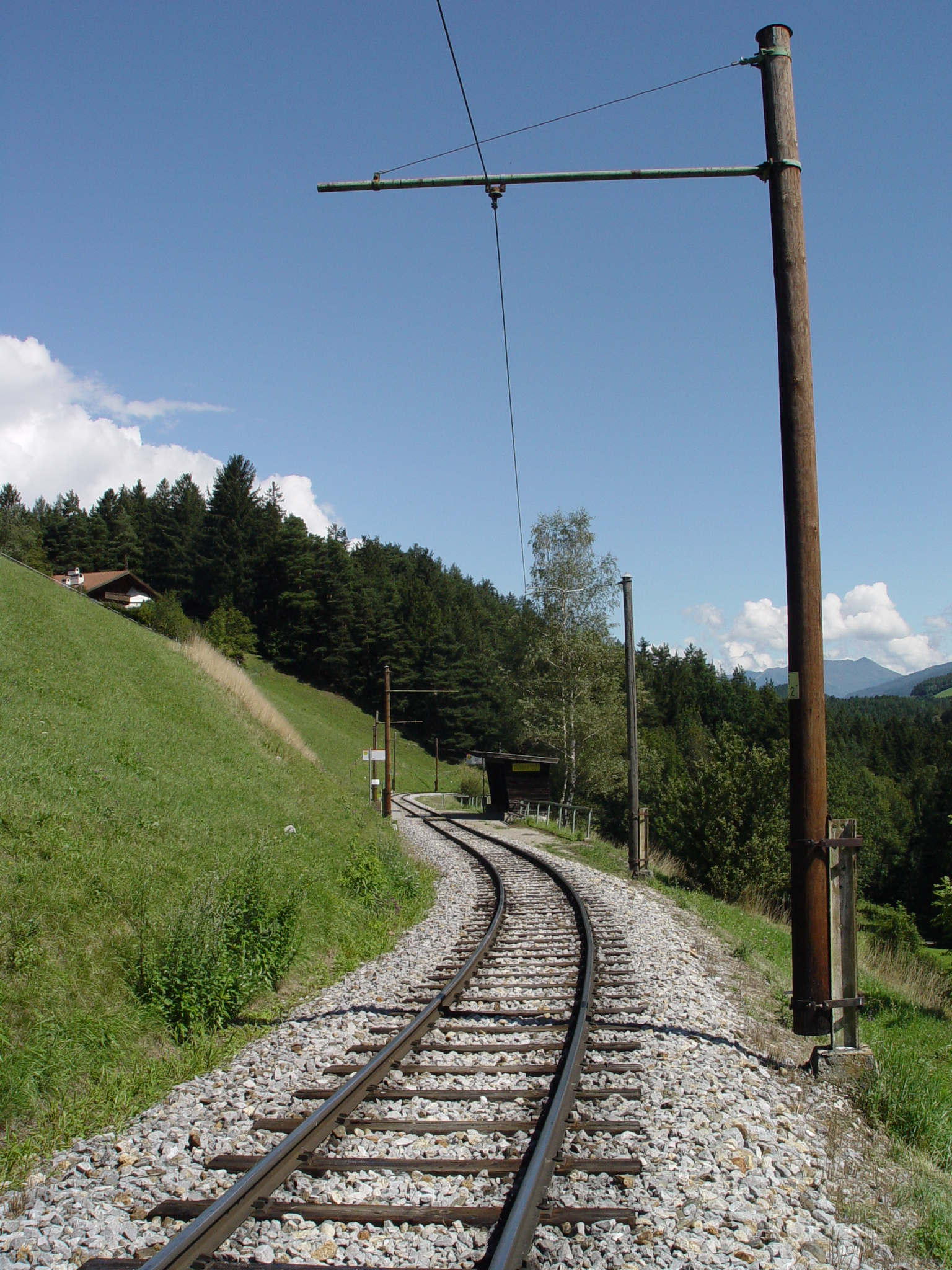
Mühlsee halt

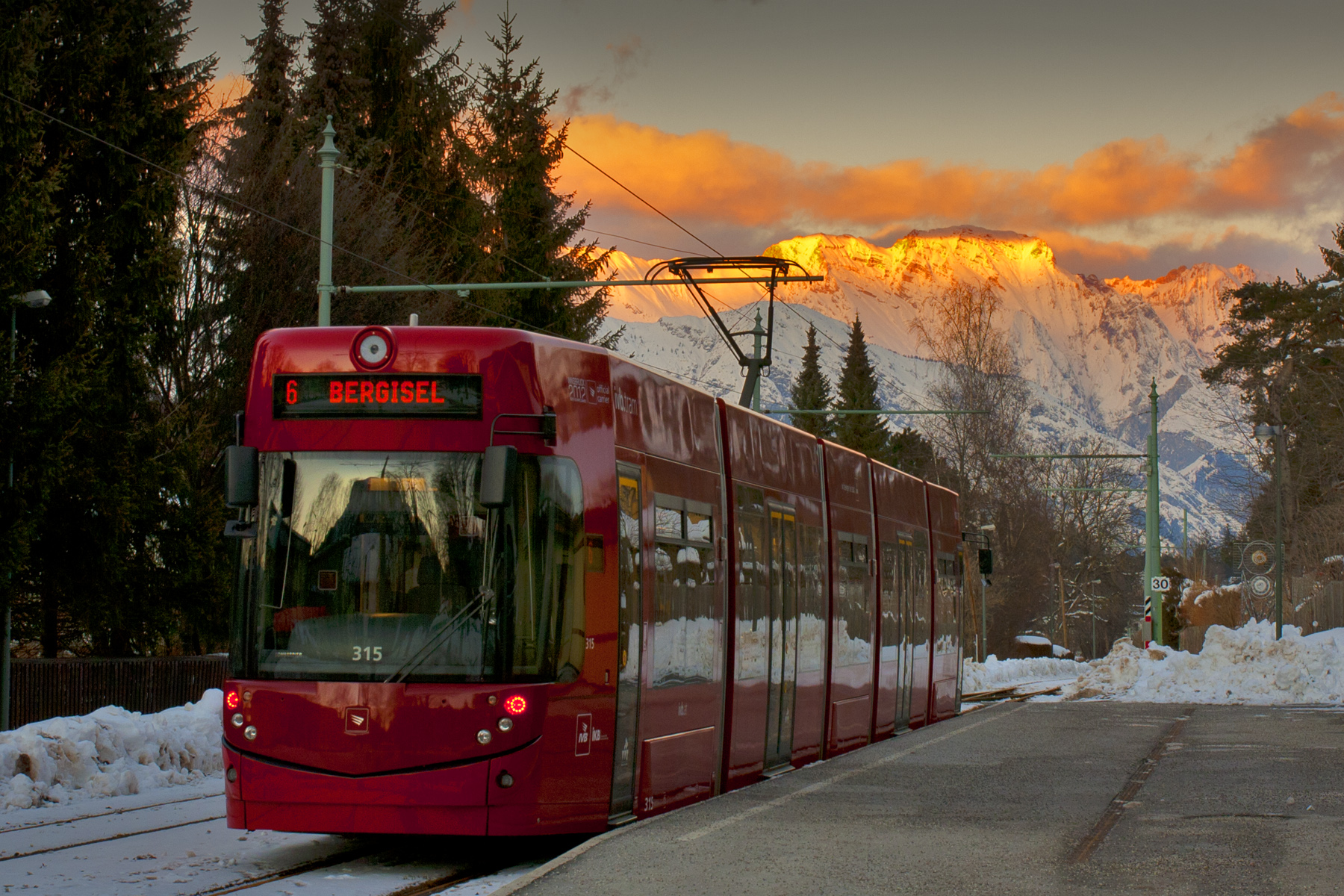
Motor car 315 at Igls terminus

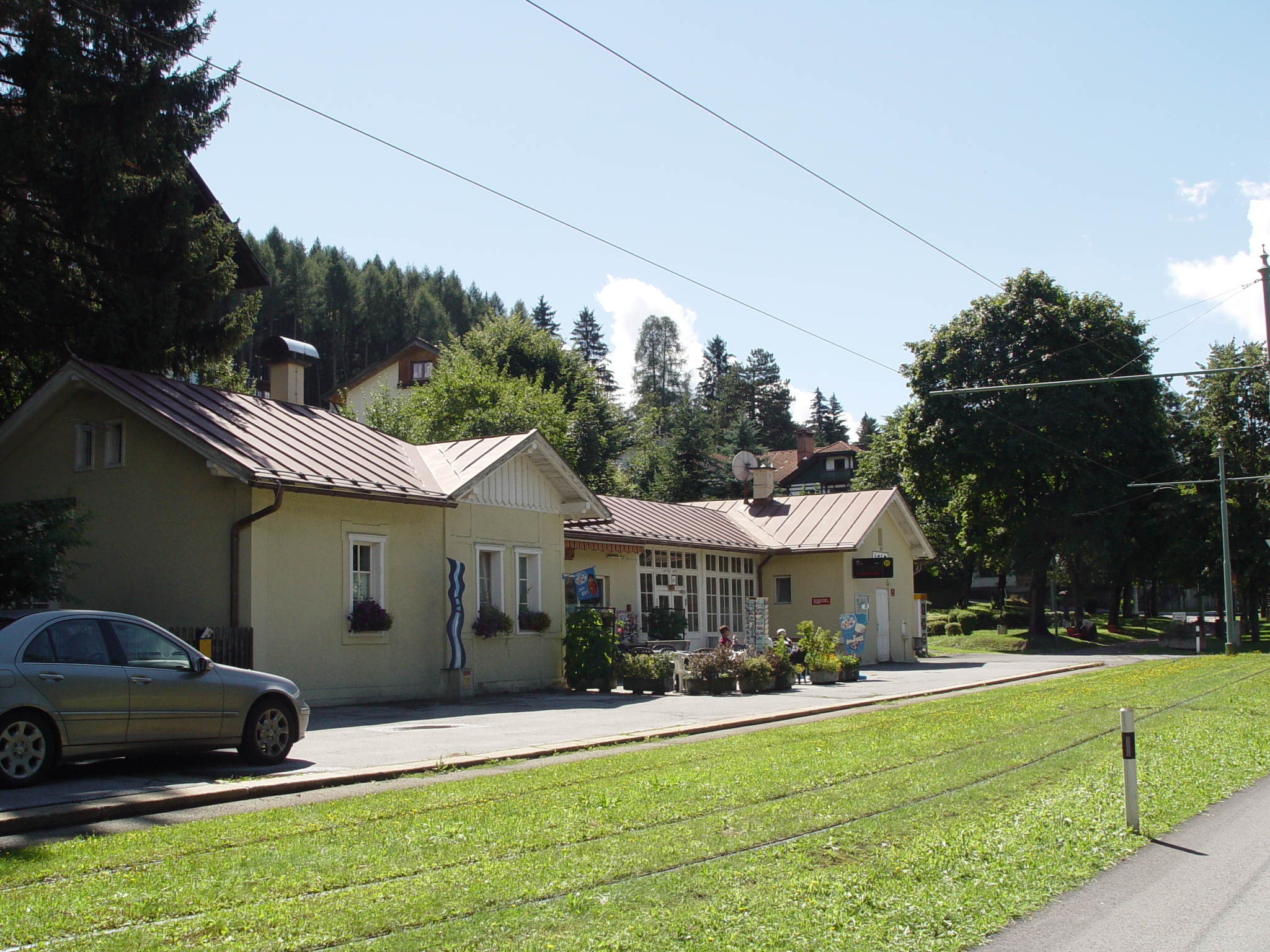
Station building at Igls

== Rolling stock ==
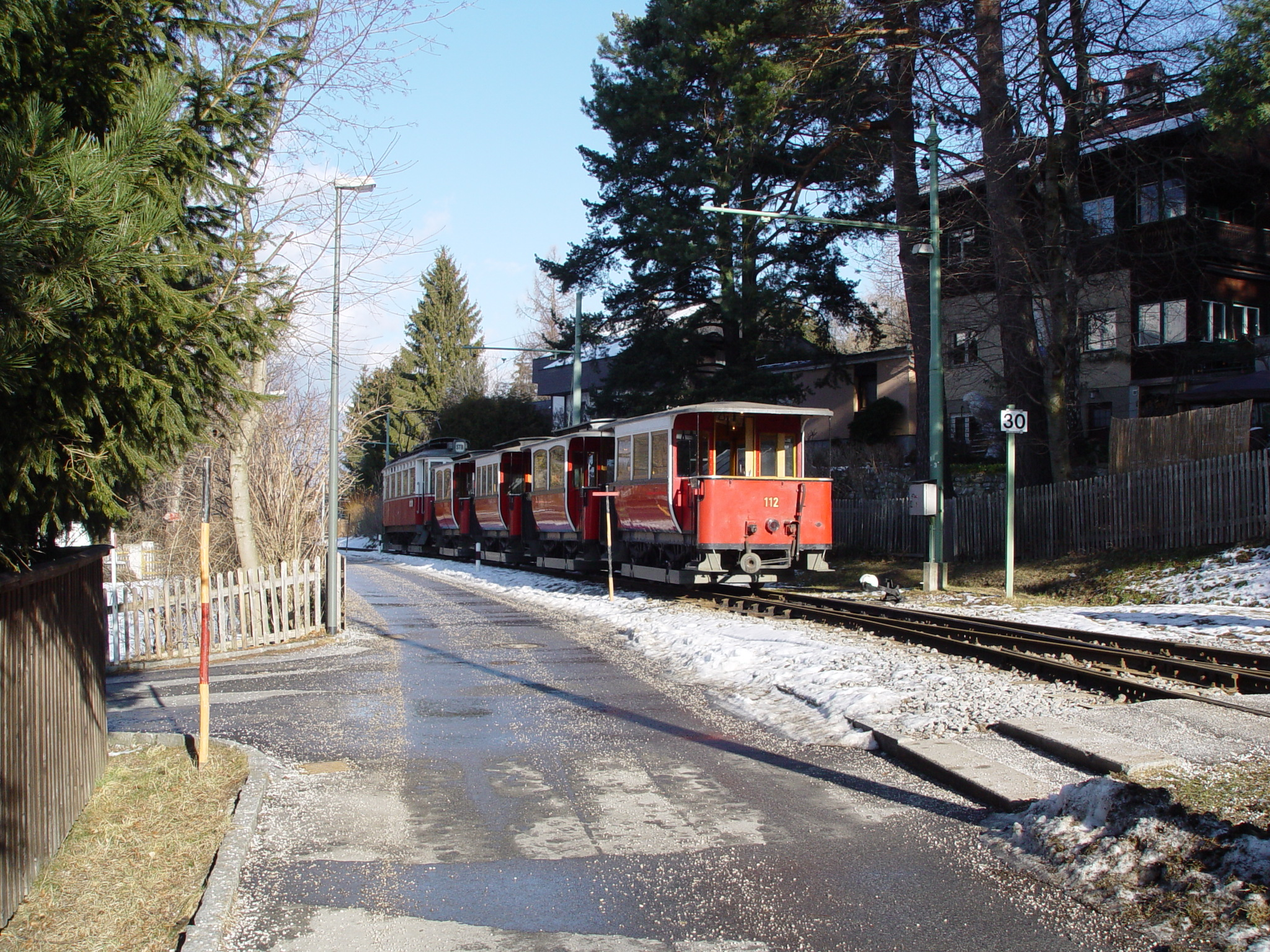
Five-car train leaving Igls (2007)

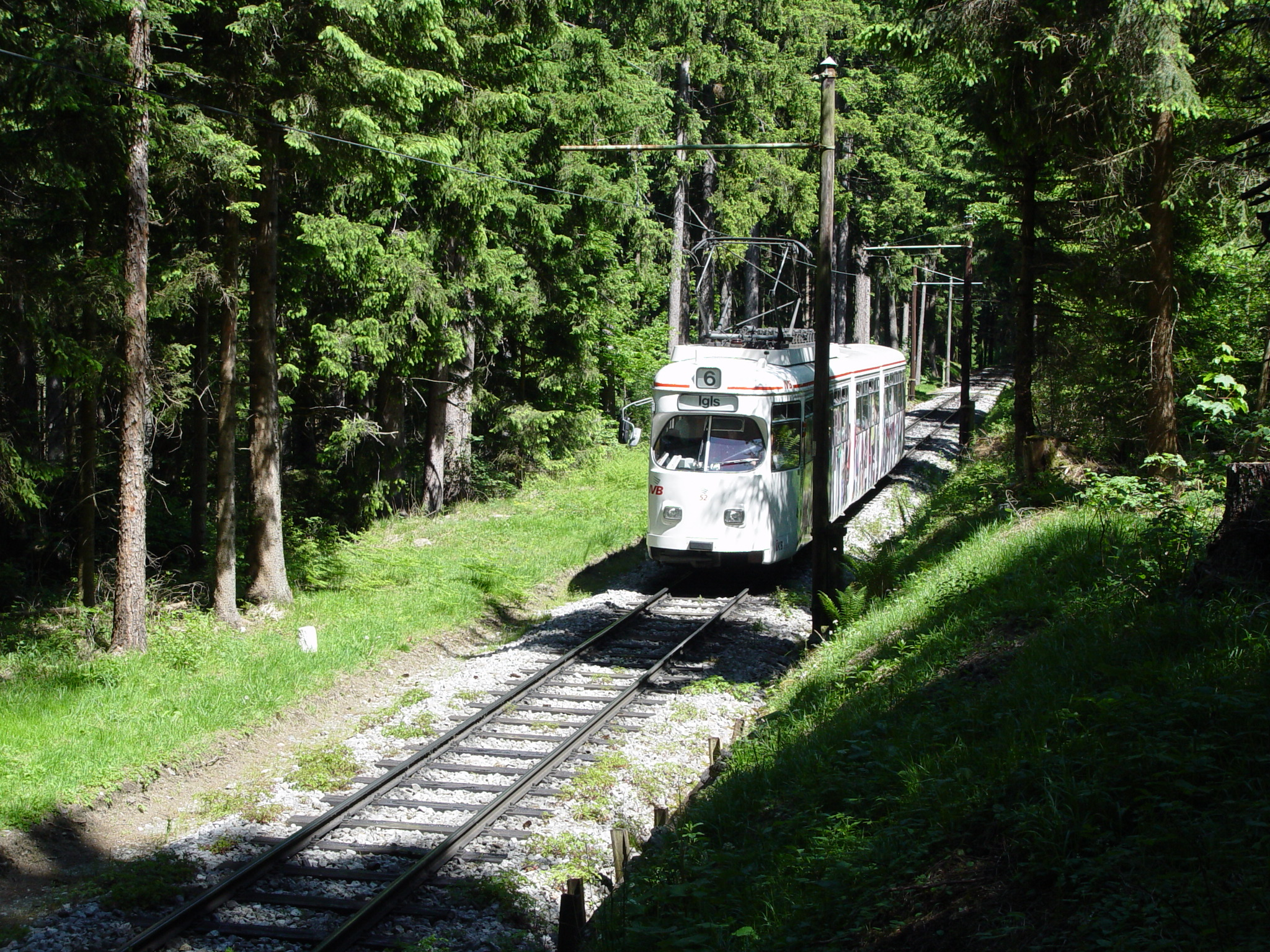
Motor car 52 on the way to Tantegert

Because of the steep gradients, the Innsbruck Mittelgebirgsbahn has always required specific rolling stock. For electric operation the trailer cars had to be equipped with solenoid brakes, which applied only to the Igler trailers and a few Hall trailers. Powerful traction motors and braking resistors were also essential; not all Hall motor cars had the former, and the city tram motor cars lacked the latter. The section from Bergisel to the crossing with Igler Straße has repeatedly been used for test runs.

From 1981 the old wooden-bodied motor cars were first replaced by former Hagen articulated cars and, from 1986, by ex-Bielefeld articulated cars specially equipped with stronger resistors for the mountain route. One event that attracted many rail enthusiasts and generated considerable coverage in specialist media was the visit of a Lohner motor car to Igls on 20 January 2007 to mark its 40th birthday; as it had resistors too weak for regular service, it had never previously been used to Igls. Other vehicles have also “strayed” onto the line from time to time.

Since mid-2009 the line has been operated by low-floor trams from the Innsbruck fleet. As all low-floor trams have the same technical equipment, any car from the current fleet can be used here.

Rolling stock used on the Innsbruck Mittelgebirgsbahn includes:

- Flexity Outlook (“Cityrunner”), nos. 301–326
- “Igler” steam locomotives, nos. 1–3
- Four-axle “Haller” motor cars, nos. 1–8
- Ex-Bielefeld articulated cars, nos. 31–42 and 51–53
- Ex-Hagen articulated cars, nos. 81–88
- Two-axle “Igler” trailers, nos. 101–112
- Two-axle “Meran” trailers, nos. 146–147
- Igler goods wagons
- “Small snow blower”, no. 200
- Diesel works car, no. 22

== Bibliography ==
- Walter Pramstaller (2024). ... von Dampf zu Niederflur; Chronik der Innsbrucker Straßenbahn [... from steam to low-floor; chronicle of the Innsbruck tramway] (2 ed.). Innsbruck: Eigenverlag. ISBN 978-3-200-08935-8.
- Walter Kreutz (1991). Straßenbahnen, Busse und Seilbahnen von Innsbruck [Trams, buses and cableways of Innsbruck] (2 ed.). Innsbruck: Steiger. ISBN 3-85423-008-7.
- Peter Wegenstein, Hellmuth Fröhlich (photogr.): Innsbrucks Straßenbahn. Zweite, überarbeitete Auflage. Bahn im Bild, Band 28, ZDB-ID 52827-4. Pospischil, Vienna 1992.
- Walter Kreutz (2000). "Durch Wälder und über Wiesen – ein Jahrhundert Innsbrucker Mittelgebirgsbahn" [Through woods and meadows – a century of the Innsbruck Mittelgebirgsbahn]. Innsbruck: Eigenverlag Tiroler Museumsbahnen.
- Werner Duschek, Walter Pramstaller u. a. (2008). "Local- und Straßenbahnen im alten Tirol" [Local and tramways in old Tyrol]. Innsbruck: Eigenverlag Tiroler Museumsbahnen.
- Thomas Lexer: Trassierungsstudie über die Verlängerung der Straßenbahn von Igls nach Patsch. Diploma thesis. University of Innsbruck, Innsbruck 2008.
- Die Innsbrucker Mittelgebirgsbahn. Innsbrucks romantische Lokalbahn. In: Günter Denoth: Die Innsbrucker Straßenbahnen und Lokalbahnen. Sutton, Erfurt 2010, ISBN 978-3-86680-695-5, pp. 19–28.
- Ray Deacon: Innsbruck's alpine tramways. Light Rail Transit Association, Welling 2011, ISBN 978-0-948106-39-2.
- Walter Kreutz (2011). Straßenbahnen, Busse und Seilbahnen von Innsbruck [Trams, buses and cableways of Innsbruck]. Haymon-Verlag. ISBN 978-3-85218-649-8.
- Karl Armbruster: Die Tiroler Bergbahnen. Buchdruckerei G. Davis & Co., Vienna 1914, Die Innsbrucker Mittelgebirgsbahn, pp. 71–78 (Digital copy at the South Tyrol Provincial Library [accessed on September 15, 2017]).
