= Stubai =

Stubai may refer to:

- Stubai Alps, (German: Stubaier Alpen), a mountain range in the Central Eastern Alps of Europe
- Stubaital, the central valley of the Stubai Alps
- Stubai Valley Railway (German: Stubaitalbahn), an 18.2 km (11.31 mi) long narrow gauge interurban tram from Innsbruck to Fulpmes in Tyrol, Austria
