= Natters =

- Municipality
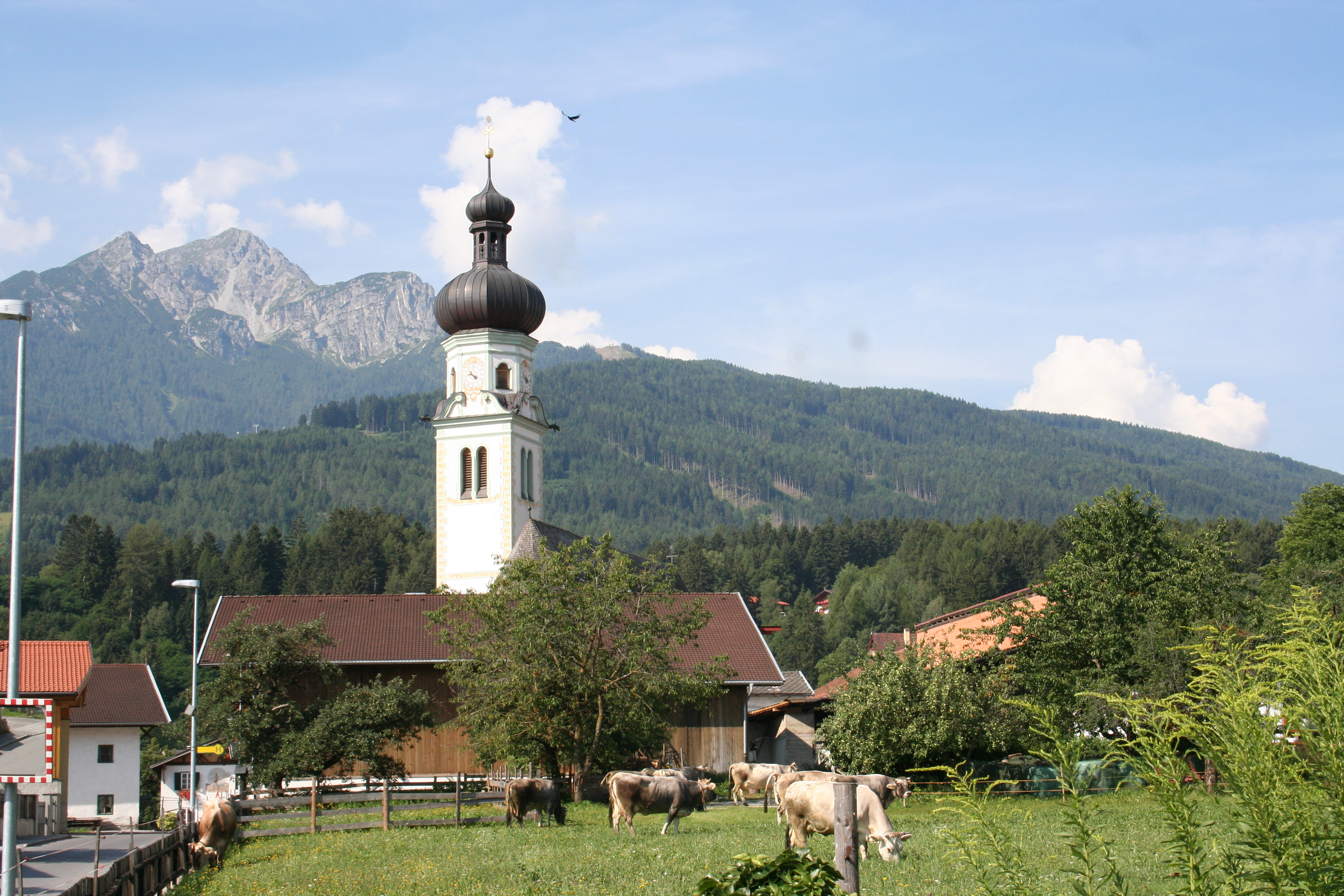

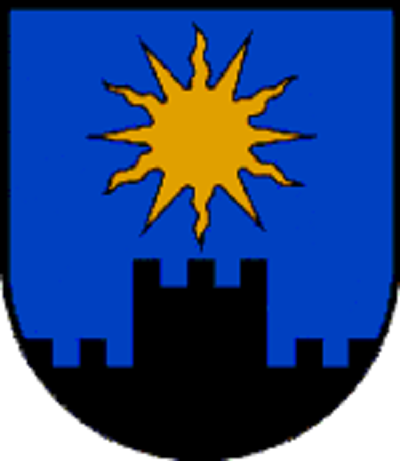
- Coat of arms

- Location within Austria
- Coordinates: 47°14′02″N 11°22′24″E
- Country: Austria
- State: Tyrol
- District: Innsbruck Land

Government
  - Mayor: Marco Untermarzoner (Independent)

Area
  - Total: 7.33 km^{2} (2.83 sq mi)
- Elevation: 783 m (2,569 ft)

Population (2026)
  - Total: 2,190
  - Density: 299/km^{2} (774/sq mi)
- Time zone: UTC+1 (CET)
  - Summer (DST): UTC+2 (CEST)
- Postal code: 6161
- Area code: 0512
- Vehicle registration: IL
- Website: www.natters.tirol.gv.at

Natters is a municipality in the district Innsbruck-Land in the Austrian state of Tyrol located 3.5 km south of Innsbruck. The village was mentioned in documents around 1151 for the first time. Natters as well as Mutters received connection with Innsbruck thanks to the Stubaitalbahn in 1904. The popular Natterer See is a treasure for tourists in summer.

As of 2026, the municipality has a population of 2,190.

== Demographics ==
Historical population
Year	Pop.	±%
1869	354	—
1880	400	+13.0%
1890	450	+12.5%
1900	419	−6.9%
1910	380	−9.3%
1923	456	+20.0%
1934	526	+15.4%
1939	537	+2.1%
1951	845	+57.4%
1961	922	+9.1%
1971	1,146	+24.3%
1981	1,558	+36.0%
1991	1,788	+14.8%
2001	1,835	+2.6%
2011	1,895	+3.3%
2021	2,087	+10.1%
2026	2,190	+4.9%
