= Natterer See =

Lake in Innsbruck-Land District, Tyrol, Austria

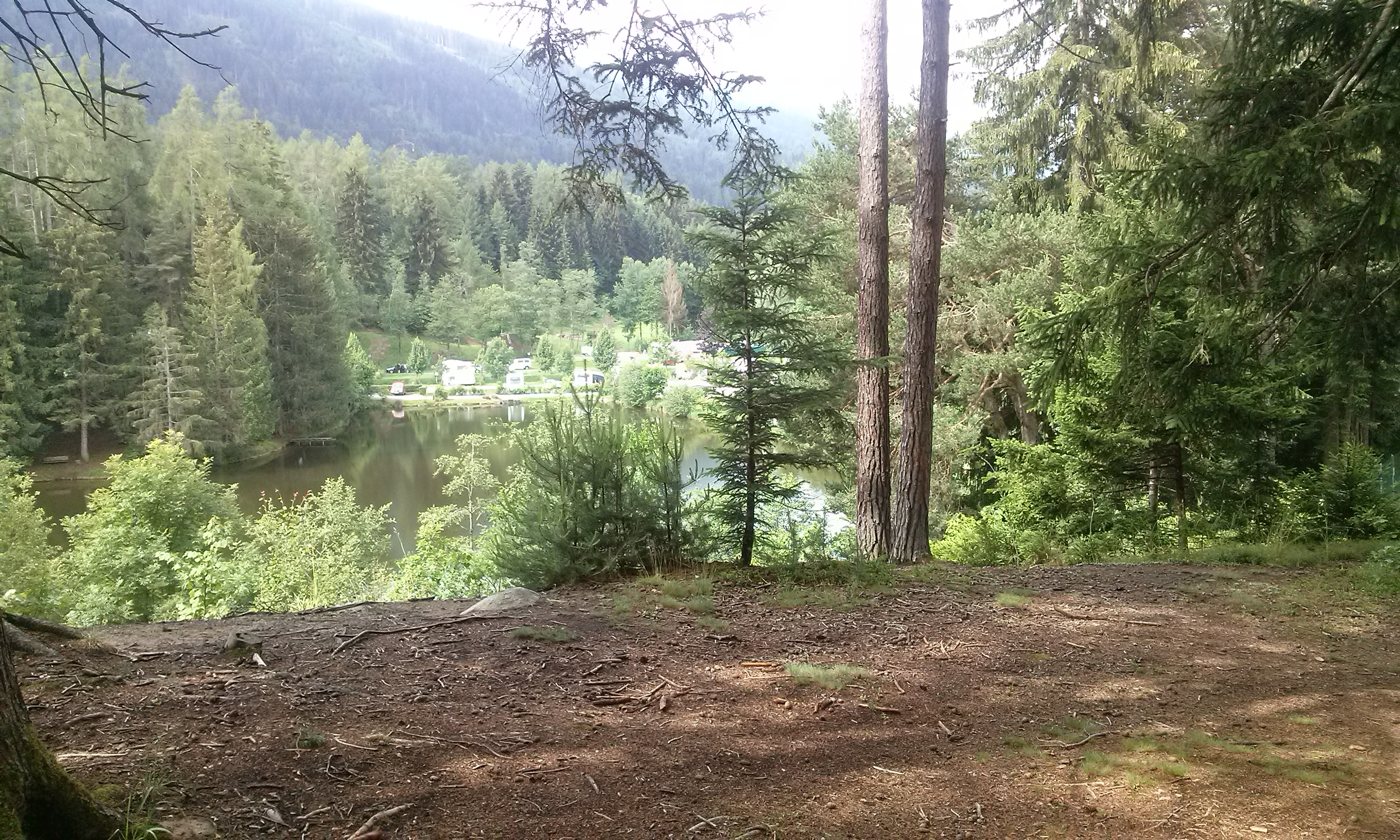

- Location within Tyrol, Austria
- Location: Tyrol
- Coordinates: 47°14′14.17″N 11°20′28.46″E
- Basin countries: Austria
- Surface area: 3.5 ha (8.6 acres)
- Average depth: 1.3 m (4 ft 3 in)
- Max. depth: 3.5 m (11 ft)
- Water volume: approx. 84,000 m^{3} (68 acre⋅ft)
- Surface elevation: 830 m (2,720 ft)

The Natterer See (or Lake Natters) is located 2.5 km west of Natters, 830 metres above sea level. It is one of the larger highland lakes in the vicinity of Innsbruck. Several hiking trails lead round the lake.

Even though it's fen water, the lake has an excellent water quality (Grade A). Reed regions at the shores and pipes supply the lake with fresh water. Various kinds of carp live in the lake.

- Water temperature: 18–20 °C in Summer
