= Muttereralmbahn =

Gondola lift in Austria

Coordinates: 47.2224°N 11.3663°E

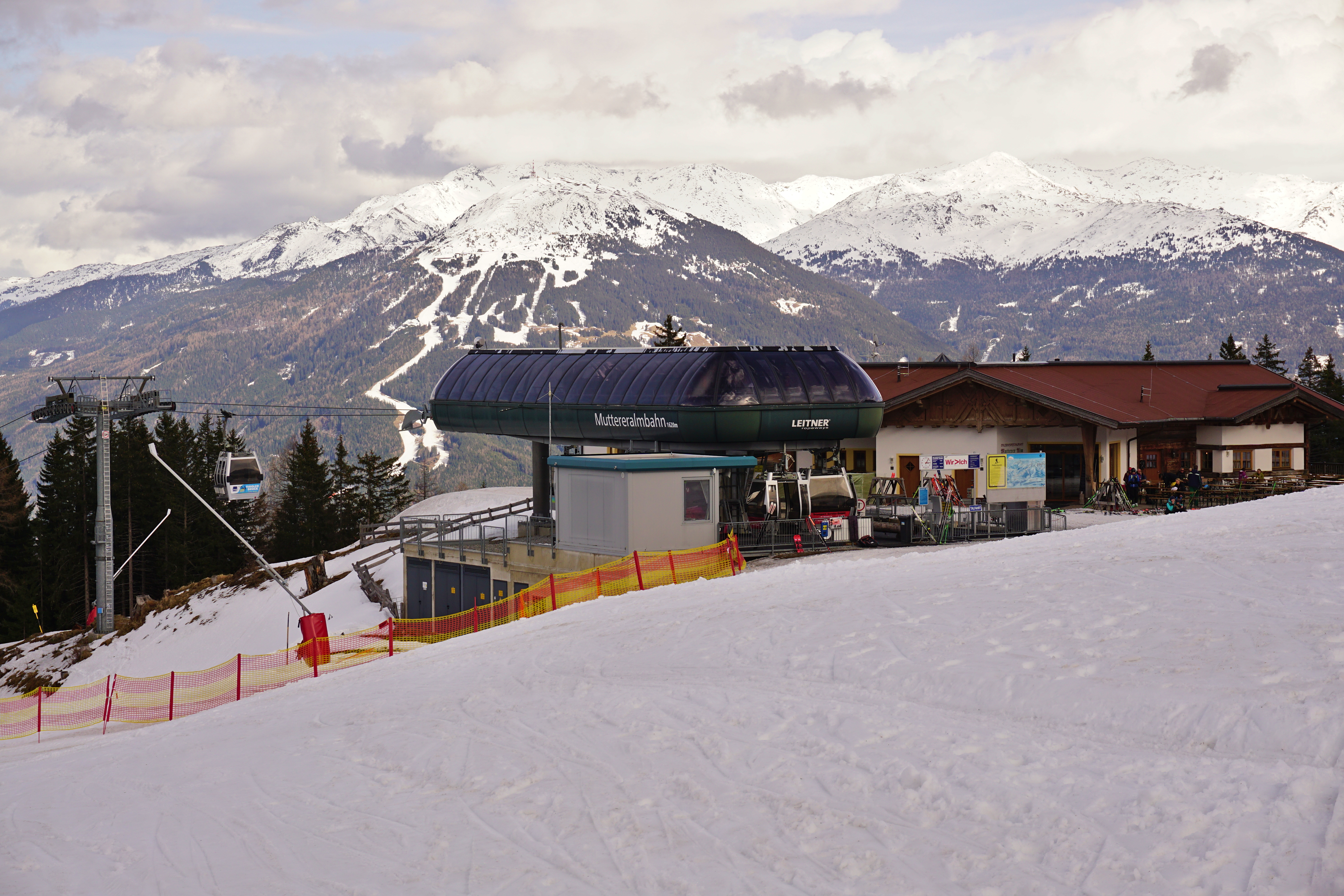
Muttereralmbahn Station

The Muttereralmbahn is an aerial tramway in Mutters, Tyrol, Austria.

In 1954, the first cable car leading from Mutters to the popular Mutterer Alm ski resort was opened. This facility, known for its characteristic egg-shaped cabins, was shut down in 2000.

A new aerial tramway with 8-person cabins was opened on January 5, 2006.
