= Innsbruck Stubaital station =

Railway station in Tyrol, Austria

Coordinates: 47°15′10″N 11°23′53″E

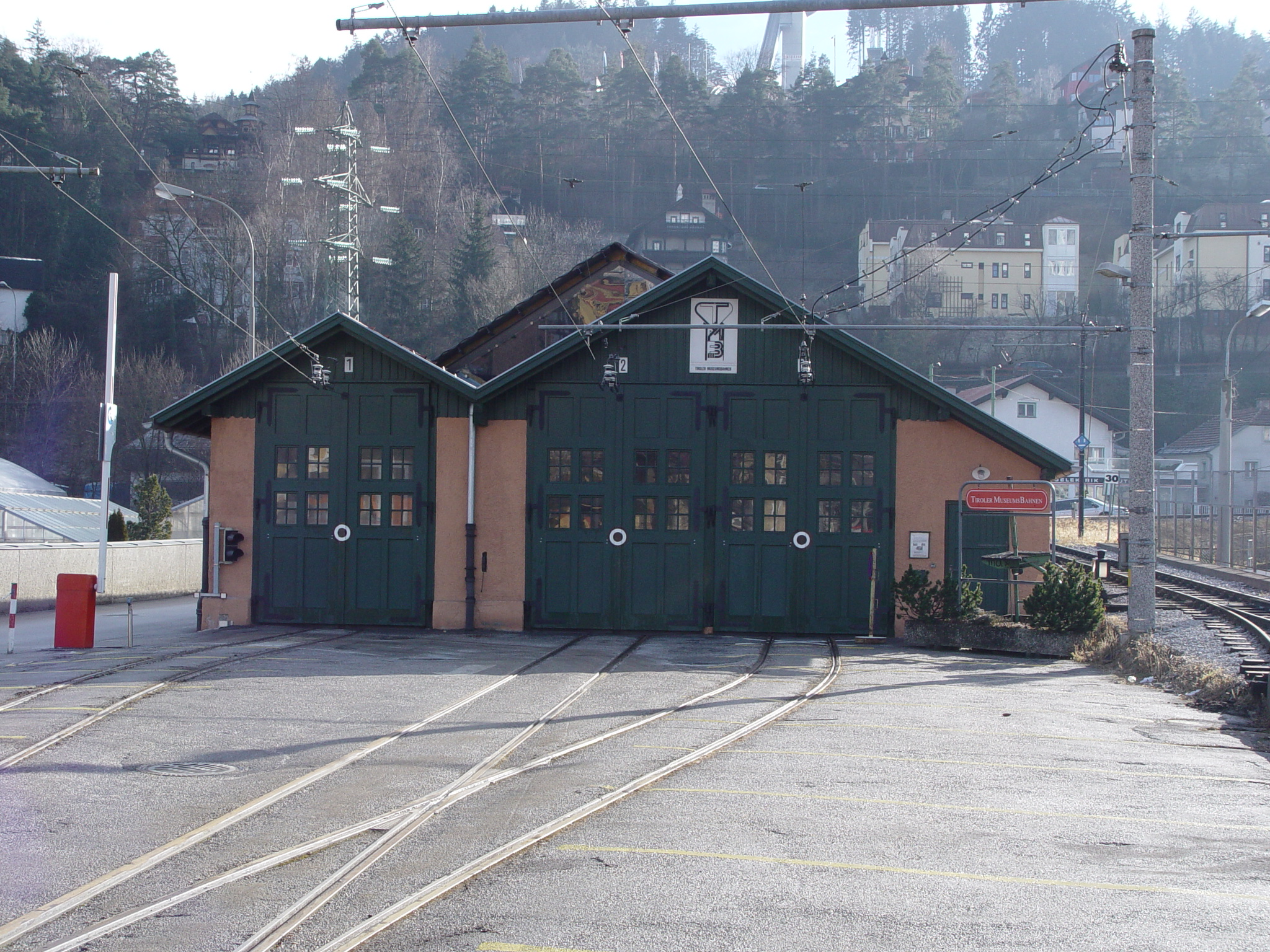
Locomotive shed at Stubaital station

Stubaital station (German: Stubaitalbahnhof) was built in 1903 and, until 1983, was the terminus of the Stubai Valley Railway in Innsbruck. Since 1983 trains approaching from Fulpmes have been routed through the city of Innsbruck.

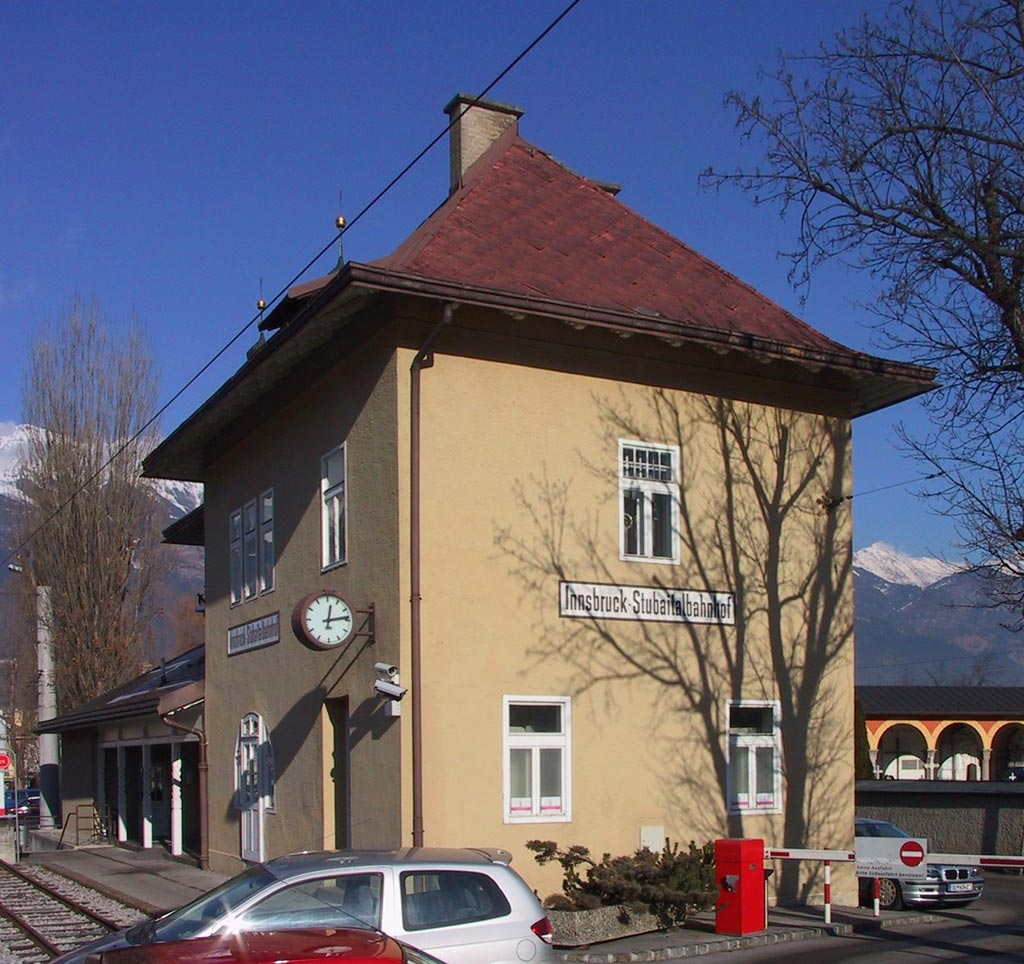
Stubaital station, Innsbruck

Originally the station, which is located on the Brenner Road at the foot of the Bergisel, had a nameboard announcing the station name as Wilten-Stubai because the village of Wilten was independent until 1904. On the station land there used to be a goods depot, a station building with a kiosk, waiting hall and stationmaster's office as well as a two-road locomotive shed for the Stubai Valley Railway. The shed was soon expanded by a further road, because the locomotive fleet increased significantly to handle the heavy traffic on the line. The goods depot was torn down in 1974 when freight transport on the Stubai Valley Railway was withdrawn.

Following the conversion of the Stubai Valley Railway to direct current working in 1983, the station was no longer needed and the trackage in front of the shed was lifted. The Tyrolean Museum Railways – then a newly founded society – was given the building in order to preserve the vehicles for museum purposes. The Localbahn museum was established in the old stationmaster's office and waiting room. Over the years a new array of tracks was laid in the station yard and a connexion to the Innsbruck tram network (of the Innsbruck Transport Company) installed. In 2000, the shed was given a major overhaul.

In summer 2007 the Stubai Valley Railway could not run trains into the city centre due to maintenance work on the points in the depot of the Innsbruck tram system, which is why the old Stubaital station was reactivated for several weeks after a gap of 24 years.
