= Tiroler MuseumsBahnen =

Railway society in Tyrol, Austria

Coordinates: 47°15′10″N 11°23′53″E

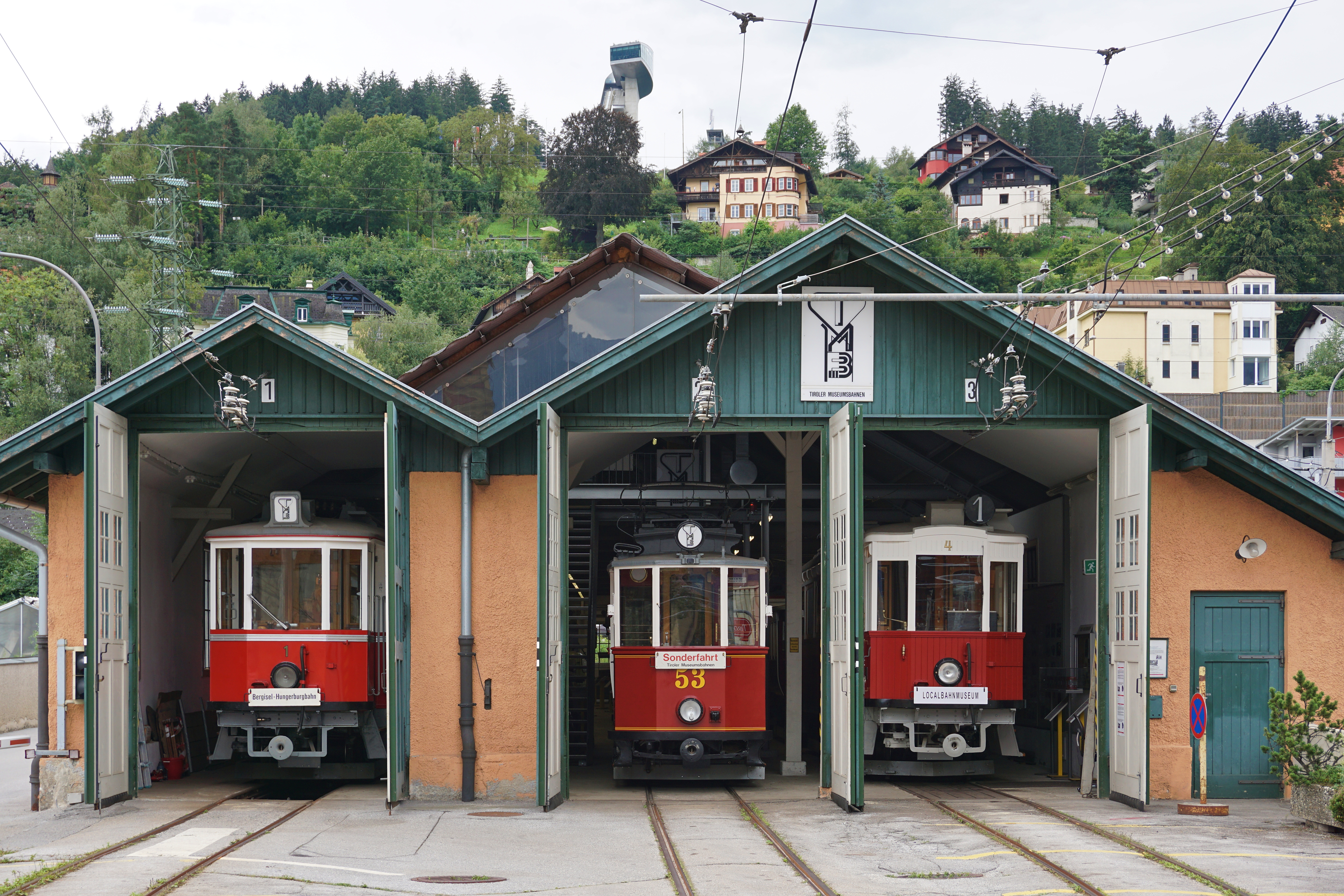
- Locomotive shed at the Localbahn Museum
- Established: 31 May 1983
- Location: Innsbruck, Austria
- Type: transport
- Owner: Tiroler MuseumsBahnen
- Website: http://tmb.at/

The Tyrolean Museum Railways or Tiroler MuseumsBahnen (TMB) is a railway society in Austria whose aim is the preservation and/or documentation of the historically important branch lines (known as Localbahnen) and their rolling stock in the state of Tyrol.

The Tyrolean Museum Railways have three main spheres of operation:

- The Tyrolean Localbahn Museum (Tiroler Localbahnmuseum) in Innsbruck
- A collection of rolling stock that includes some of the most valuable, historic vehicles from the Tyrolean branch lines
- A club whose members voluntarily run the Localbahn Museum, restore and renovate historic vehicles and restaurieren operate special trips using working trains.

== History ==
When, in 1983, it finally became clear that the 79-year-old railbuses on the Stubai Valley Railway (Stubaitalbahn) were to be withdrawn from service, the Tiroler MuseumsBahnen Society was founded in May of that same year "with the aim of preserving these historically important vehicles for posterity." Although initially the prospect of acquiring suitable premises for the society did not look good, thanks to political supporters, including the then mayor, Nischer, the former locomotive depot and part of the Stubaital station (waiting room and movements office) were able to be acquired and the Localbahn Museum was opened as early as summer 1985. In order to create space for more vehicles, the majority of the trailer cars from the Stubai Valley Railway were sold or rented. For example, an Igler driving trailer, several Igler trailer cars and some goods wagons from the Stubai Valley Railway were added to the collection. In 1989 the first vehicle - goods wagon 32 from the Stubai Valley Railway - was restored to its original state. By the beginning of 2009 another 16 vehicles - some in their original delivery condition - were made operational. In 1991 they celebrated the centenary of the Innsbruck Tramway with the Innsbruck transport companies. Around the turn of the millennium the locomotive shed, which dates to 1903 and had by then become dilapidated, was given a major overhaul. In 2000 they celebrated the centenary of the Innsbruck Mountain Railway was commemorated in Innsbruck and the surrounding area and, in 2004, it was followed by centenary celebrations for the Stubai Valley Railway. In October 2008 the museum railway company itself celebrated its 25th anniversary with the active participation of politicians from the state of Tyrol and the city of Innsbruck.

== The Localbahn Museum ==
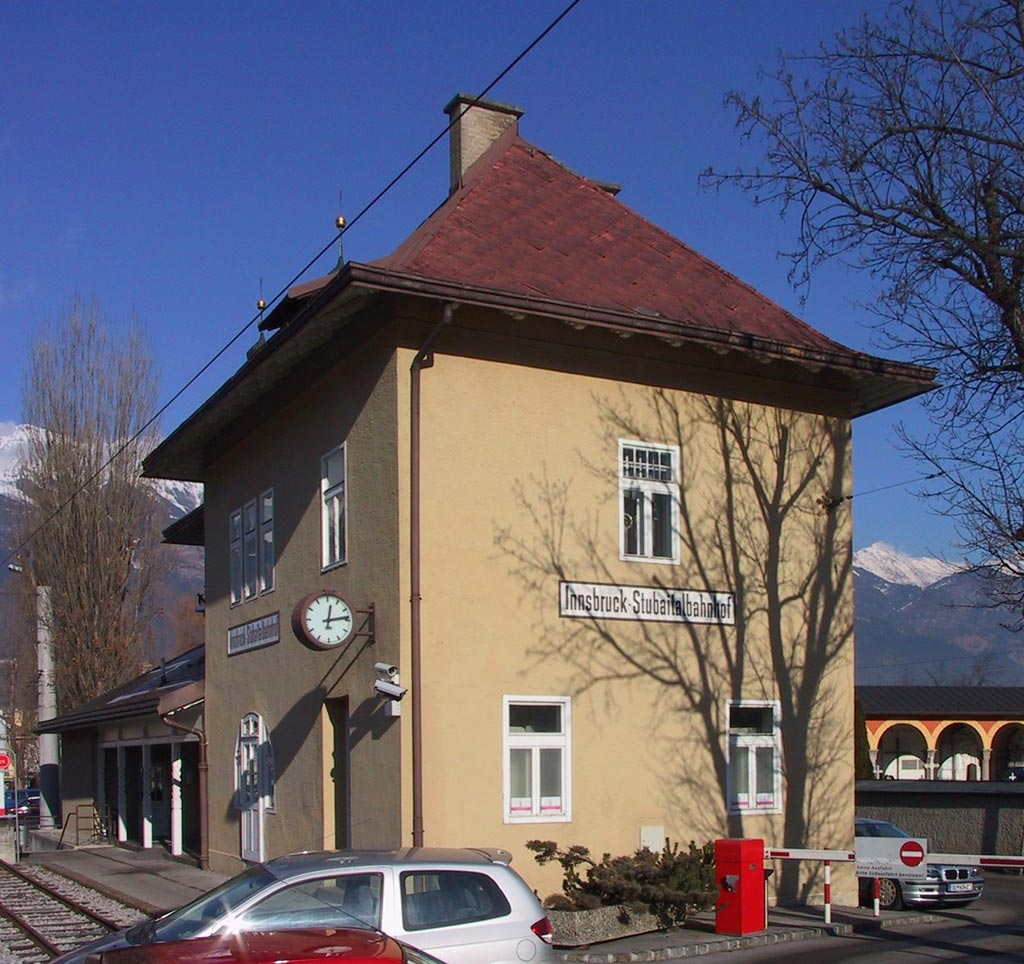
Innsbruck's Stubaital station

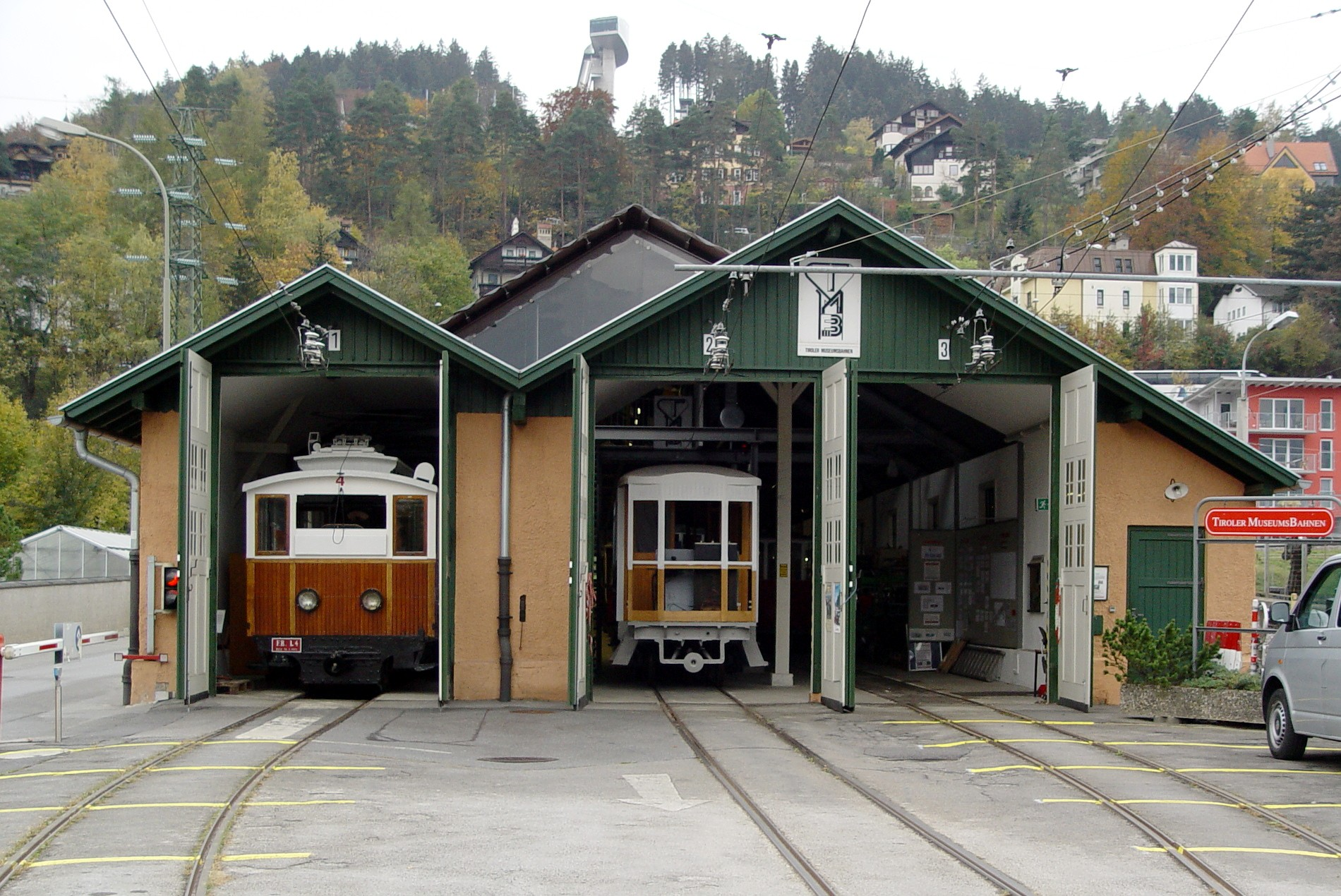
Museum shed at start of operations

A Localbahn is an Austrian term for a branch line of local importances. The Localbahn Museum is located in the old Stubaital station at the foot of the Bergisel hill, next to the present-day depot of the Innsbruck Transport Company (Innsbrucker Verkehrsbetriebe). It was opened in 1984, after the Stubai Valley Railway was converted to direct current operation and the rooms for the train director and the waiting room were no longer used. Since then the Localbahn Museum has developed into an attraction for railway fans from around the world and has a large number of visitors. In summer, a historic train regularly runs into the city in order to take tourists to the museum. The exhibition covers the following branch lines:

- Achensee Railway
- Bozen Tramway
- Dermulo–Mendel railway
- Dolomite Railway
- Fleims Valley Railway
- Grödner Railway
- Innsbruck Mittelgebirgs Railway
- Innsbruck tram system (operated by Innsbrucker Verkehrsbetriebe)
- Innsbruck–Hall i. Tirol railway
- Lana−Burgstall−Oberlana railway
- Lana–Meran railway
- Meran Tramway
- Mittenwald Railway
- Mori–Arco–Riva railway
- Ritten Railway
- Stubaitalbahn
- Taufers Railway
- Trient−Malè railway
- Überetsch Railway
- Vinschgau Railway
- Zillertal Railway

In addition there are annually changing special exhibitions on the individual regional railways and several publications on current topics are issued.

== Rolling stock ==
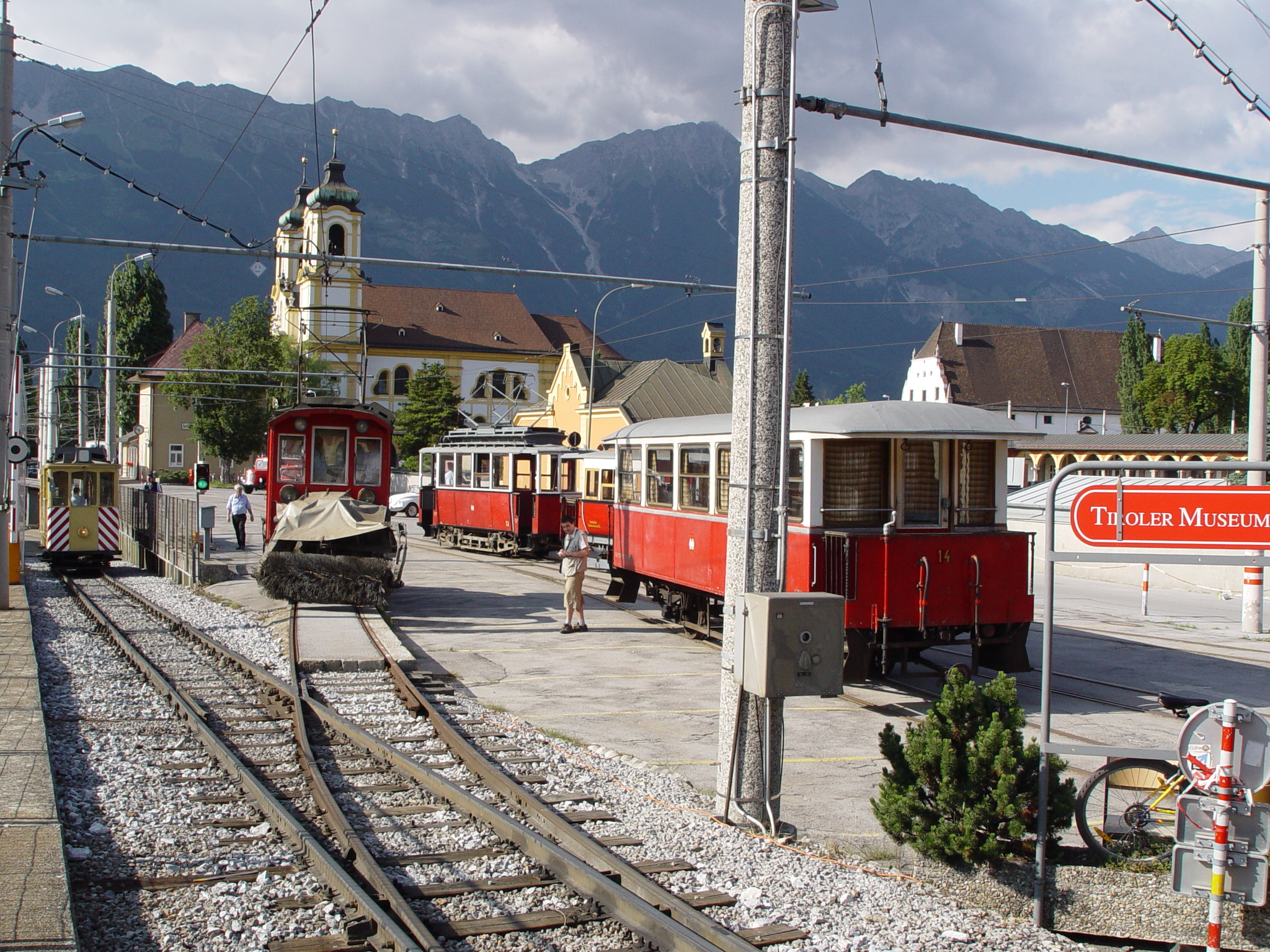
Sidings at the Tyrolean Museum Railways

The rolling stock is housed in the old depot of the Stubaital Railway in Innsbruck. In 1983 the collection only comprised decommissioned vehicles from that railway line, but over the course of time it has expanded. Vehicles from other branch lines were bought and transported (back) to Innsbruck. For example, at the beginning of 2009 there were about 25 vehicles (10 power cars, 10 trailer cars, 5 goods wagons and 1 snow plough) from 4 branch lines and a tramway:

- Innsbrucker Mittelgebirgs Railway
- Innsbruck Transport Company
- Innsbruck-Hall i. Tirol railway
- Ritten Railway
- Stubaital Railway

For example, the only working rack railway locomotive from the Ritten Railway is owned by the TMB as well as the first single-phase alternating current power car. Several of the vehicles are over 100 years old and have been returned to their original state. One feature of this collection is that the majority of the vehicles are operational.

== Sources ==
- Duschek, W., Pramstaller W. u. a.: Local- und Straßenbahnen im alten Tirol, Eigenverlag Tiroler MuseumsBahnen, Innsbruck 2008, 48 S.
- Walter Kreuz, Straßenbahnen, Busse und Seilbahnen von Innsbruck, Steiger Verlag Innsbruck 1991, ISBN 3-85423-008-7
- Es begann 1891 - Fahrzeugführer durch das Localbahnmuseum Innsbruck. Eigenverlag Tiroler MuseumsBahnen, Innsbruck 1999, 60 S.
- Kreutz, W., Pramstaller, W., Duschek, W.: 100 Jahre Elektrische in Innsbruck. Eigenverlag Tiroler MuseumsBahnen, Innsbruck 2005, 40 S.
- Duschek, W. u. a.: 100 Jahre Stubaitalbahn. Eigenverlag Tiroler MuseumsBahnen, Innsbruck 2004, 48 S.
- Durch Wälder und über Wiesen – Ein Jahrhundert Innsbrucker Mittelgebirgsbahn. Eigenverlag Tiroler MuseumsBahnen, Innsbruck 2000, 32 S.
