= Mutters =

Town in Tyrol, Austria

- Municipality
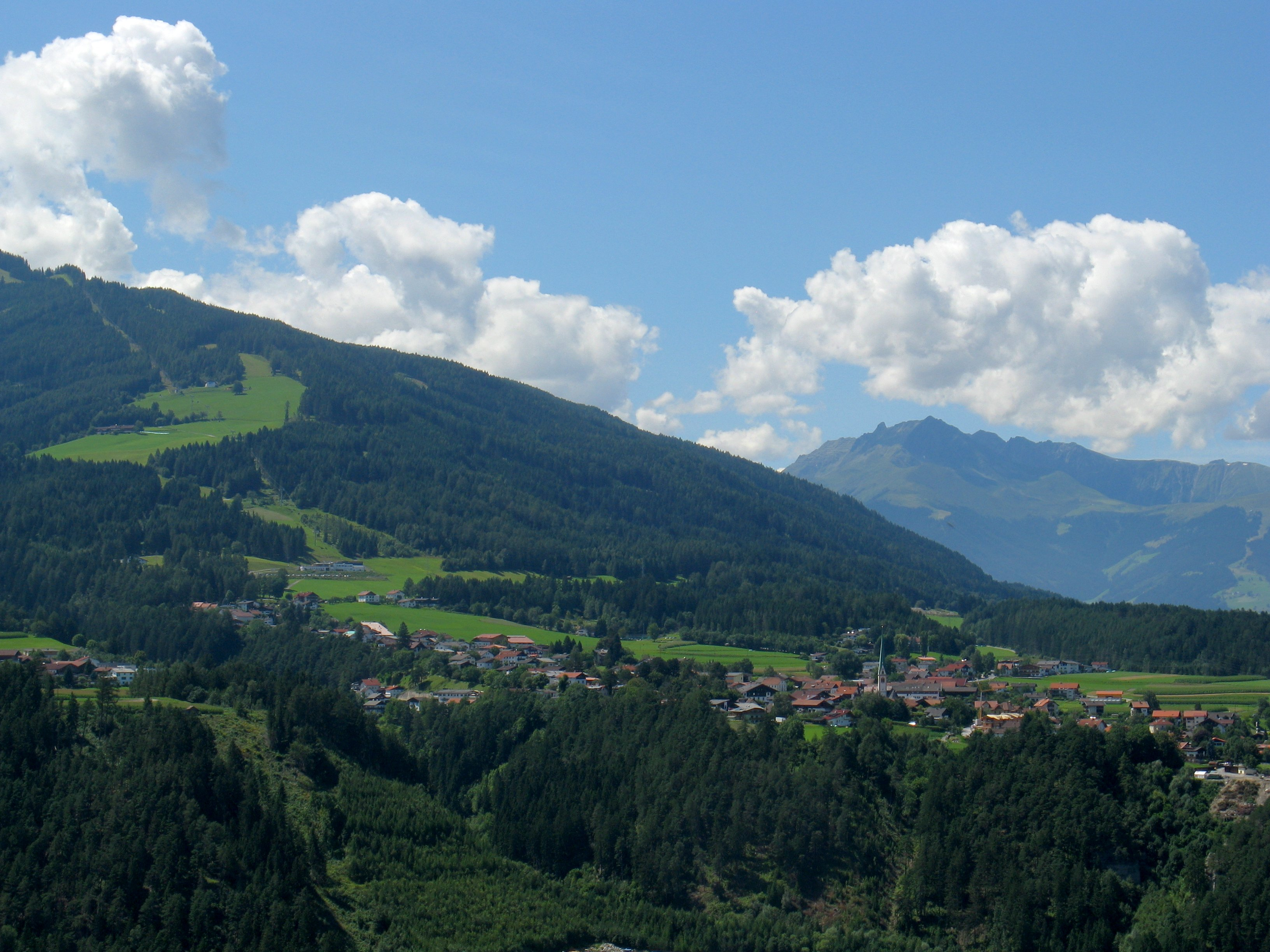
- Mutters seen from Igls in the east

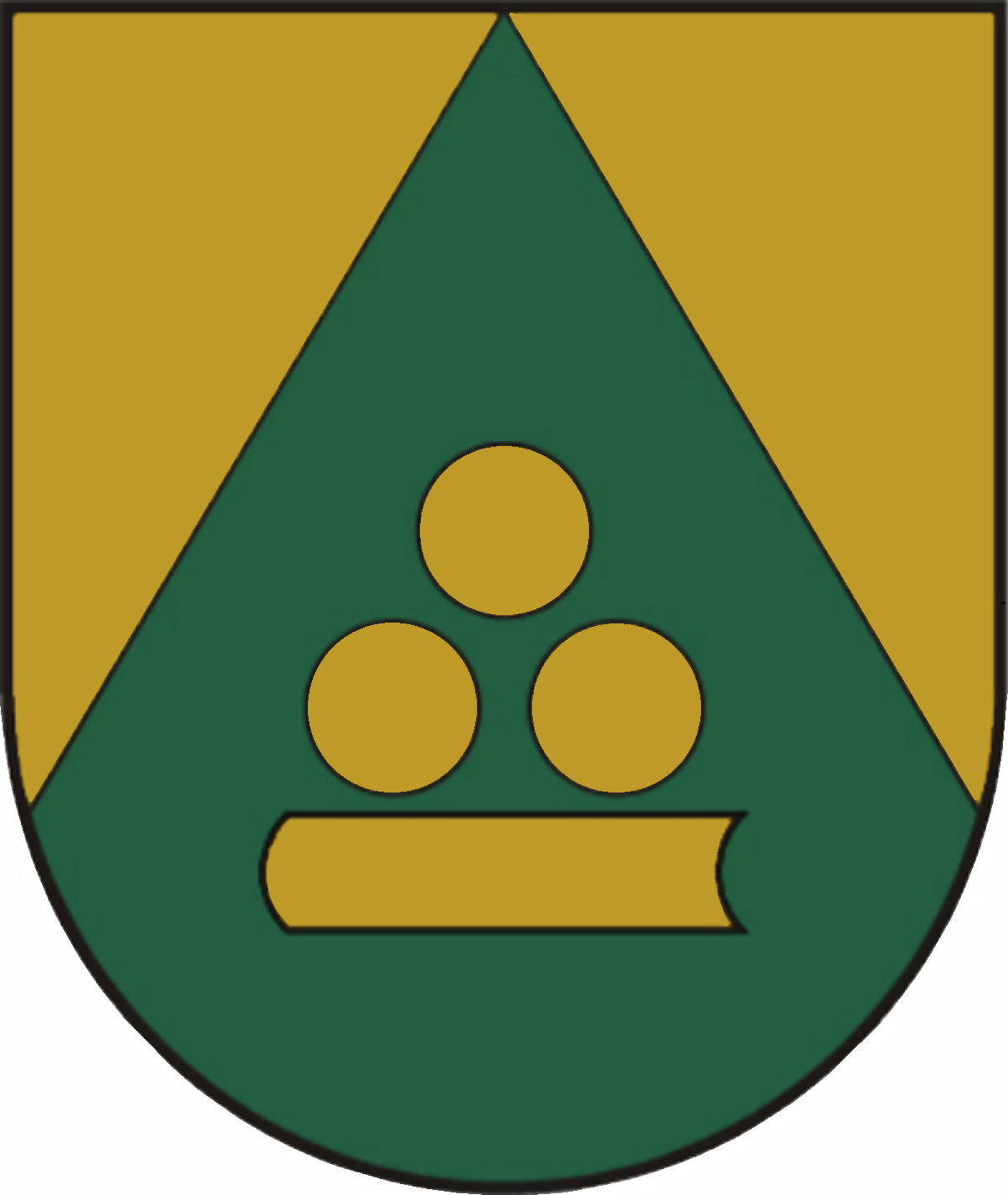
- Coat of arms

- Location within Austria Mutters (Austria)
- Coordinates: 47°14′00″N 11°22′00″E
- Country: Austria
- State: Tyrol
- District: Innsbruck Land

Government
  - Mayor: Hansjörg Peer

Area
  - Total: 19.03 km^{2} (7.35 sq mi)
- Elevation: 830 m (2,720 ft)

Population (2021)
  - Total: 2,230
  - Density: 117/km^{2} (304/sq mi)
- Time zone: UTC+1 (CET)
  - Summer (DST): UTC+2 (CEST)
- Postal code: 6162
- Area code: 0512
- Vehicle registration: IL
- Website: www.mutters.tirol.gv.at

Mutters is a municipality in the Innsbruck-Land district in the Austrian state of Tyrol. It is located 4.70 km (3 mi) south of Innsbruck. The village was first mentioned in 1100 but settlement already began app. 3000 years ago. Mutters received connection with Innsbruck thanks to the Stubaitalbahn in 1904.

The Muttereralmbahn is a cable car system originating from Mutters.

== Demographics ==
Historical population
Year	Pop.	±%
1869	640	—
1880	667	+4.2%
1890	652	−2.2%
1900	686	+5.2%
1910	824	+20.1%
1923	827	+0.4%
1934	929	+12.3%
1939	982	+5.7%
1951	1,227	+24.9%
1961	1,145	−6.7%
1971	1,441	+25.9%
1981	1,592	+10.5%
1991	1,793	+12.6%
2001	1,933	+7.8%
2011	1,983	+2.6%
2021	2,230	+12.5%
2026	2,324	+4.2%
