= Solenoid brake =

A solenoid brake is an electrically controlled brake. The brake is turned on and off by an electrical solenoid. Typically a spring engages the brake when unpowered, and the solenoid releases it when powered.

These are used along with a mechanical brake to manage the load on a cargo winch. They're also used in electric wheel chairs, hoists, printers, photocopiers, etc.
