= Stubaitalbahn =

Interurban tram in Tyrol, Austria

Coordinates: 47°15′10″N 11°23′53″E

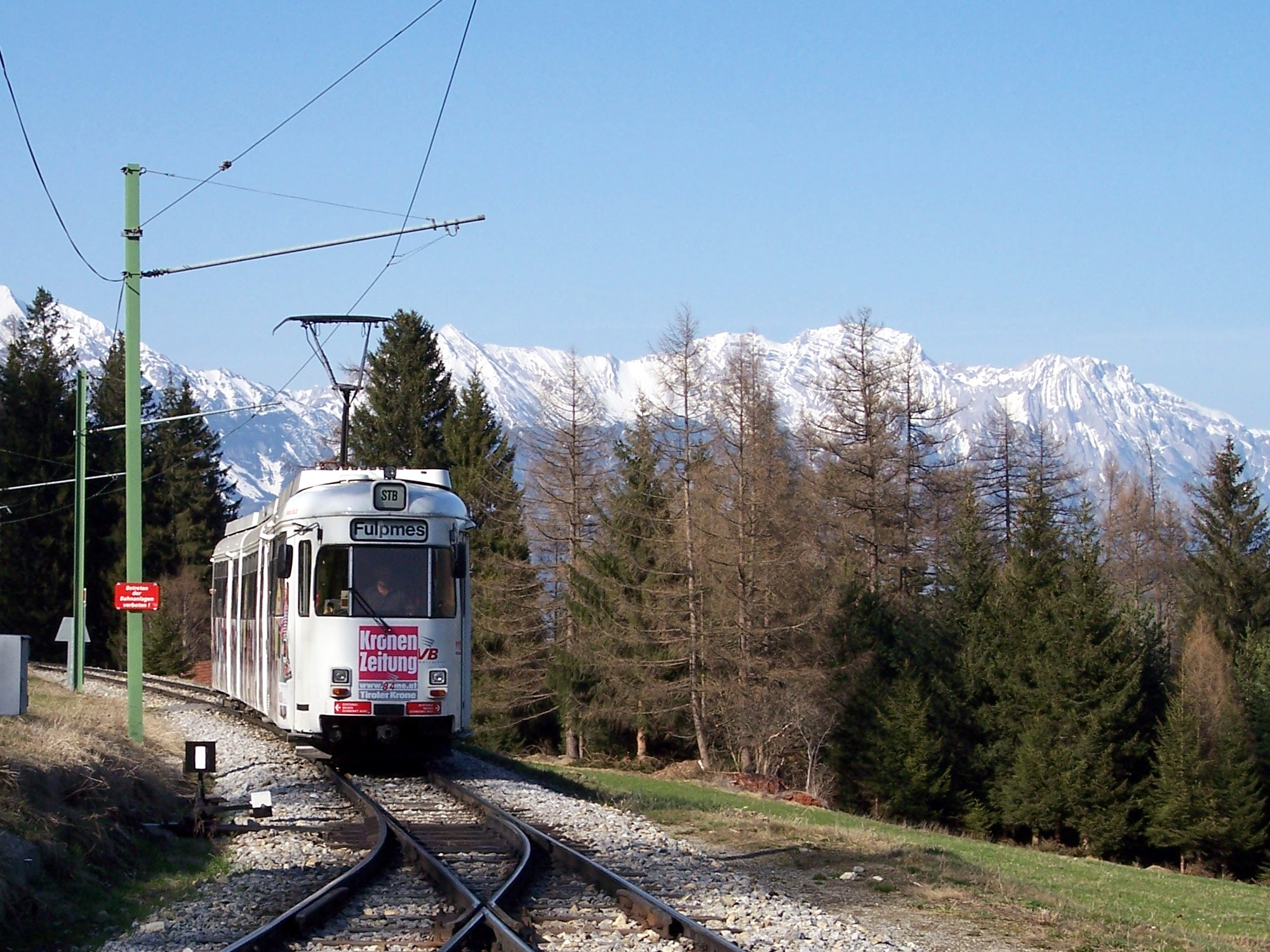

Overview
- Line number: STB
- Termini: Innsbruck; Fulpmes

Service
- Operator(s): IVB

History
- Opened: 1904

Technical
- Line length: 18.2 km (11.3 mi)
- Track gauge: 1,000 mm (3 ft 3 3/8 in) metre gauge
- Minimum radius: 40 m (130 ft)
- Electrification: Catenary: 900 V DC; before 1983: 3000 V / 50 Hz AC
- Maximum incline: 4.6 %

The Stubaitalbahn (Stubai Valley Railway) is an 18.2 km (11.3 mi) long narrow gauge interurban tram from Innsbruck to Fulpmes in Tyrol, Austria. In the city of Innsbruck, it uses the local tramway tracks. At the Stubaital station, the branch line-rated part begins. The meter gauge track starts at Innsbruck's Main station, crosses the Wilten district, and passes the villages of Natters, Mutters, Kreith, and Telfes. Between the Stubaital station and Fulpmes, the railway is single-track, but at nine stations: Sonnenburgerhof, Hölltal, Mutters, Nockhofweg Muttereralmbahn, Feldeler, Kreith, Telfer Wiesen, Luimes, Telfes, there are passing loops where the train usually uses the left-hand track. The final station, Fulpmes, has three tracks and one depot.

== See also ==
- Rail transport in Austria
