= Alexander Steinitz =

Austrian conductor (born 1967)

Alexander Steinitz (born 17 January 1967) is an Austrian conductor and since 2018 first Kapellmeister of the Theatre of West Pomerania.

== Life ==
Born in Salzburg, Steinitz received his first music lessons at the Carl Orff Institute of the Mozarteum University Salzburg. After his secondary school years in Vienna, he studied conducting with Karl Österreicher and Leopold Hager, music theory with Diether de la Motte and composition with Kurt Schwertsik. After graduating, he completed a year abroad at Yale University on the basis of a sponsorship award from the Austrian Federal Ministry for Education and the Arts, where he perfected his conducting studies with Günther Herbig, Eleazar de Carvalho and Lawrence Leighton Smith.

Prior to his position as First Kapellmeister and Deputy General Music Director of the Theatre of West Pomerania, Steinitz worked as First Kapellmeister and Deputy GMD in Krefeld-Mönchengladbach and before that in Meiningen (2009–2011). He was previously First Kapellmeister in Magdeburg (2003–2009), Deputy General Music Director at the Städtische Bühnen Osnabrück (2001–2003), and between 1995 and 2001, Kapellmeister under Intendant Brigitte Fassbaender at the Tyrolean State Theatre in Innsbruck.

Steinitz has worked with the Deutsches Symphonie-Orchester Berlin, the Philharmonisches Staatsorchester Halle, the Magdeburgische Philharmonie, the Staatsorchester Braunschweig, the Tonkünstler Orchestra, the Tiroler Sinfonieorchester, the Vienna Chamber Orchestra, the New Haven Chamber Orchestra and the Wiener Kammersolisten, whom he accompanied on their tour of Japan.

Steinitz was a prize-winner at the Forum of Young Artists in Vienna, received an award at the International Conductors' Forum in Hamm, the Magdeburg Theatre's sponsorship prize for the musical theatre section and made several radio recordings. From the 2003/2004 season onwards, he worked as first conductor at the theatre of the state capital Magdeburg, where he conducted opera productions such as Mozart's the marriage of Figaro, Così fan tutte, Rossini's The Barber of Seville and Gluck's Orfeo ed Euridice. He has also conducted concerts with the Magdeburg Philharmonic Orchestra, the West Saxon Symphony Orchestra, the Prussian Chamber Orchestra and the Youth Symphony Orchestra of the G. Ph. Telemann Conservatory. Highlights of the past seasons have included a new production of the opera La forza del destino by Giuseppe Verdi at the Staatstheater Braunschweig, an open-air realisation of Carl Orff's Carmina Burana in Magdeburg and a collaboration with choreographer Youri Vámos on the re-staging of his ballet The Fall of Otello in Gera. In 2006, Steinitz worked with director Andreas Kriegenburg on his first opera production in Magdeburg.
