= Nikolaus Netzer =

Austrian conductor

Nikolaus Netzer (born 1967) is an Austrian conductor and music school director.

== Life and career ==
Born in Schruns, Netzer studied music and instrumental education at the University of Innsbruck with a focus on choral and ensemble conducting. He completed his studies with the Magister artium. He earned his conducting diploma at the Tyrolean State Conservatory. Netzer subsequently assisted among others the conductors Gustav Kuhn, Umberto Cattini, Karl Österreicher, Nikolaus Harnoncourt.

From 1996 to 2001, he was the musical director of the Innsbruck University Orchestra. Furthermore, Netzer took over the direction of the chamber orchestra "Musica Camerata Innsbruck" in 1999 and later the musical direction of the "Tiroler Kammerchor Wörgl". He also taught at the Music School of the City of Innsbruck, at the University of Music and Performing Arts Mozarteum in Salzburg and at the University of Innsbruck.

From 1999 to 2001, he was choir director and bandmaster of the Tiroler Festspiele in Erl, from 2001 to 2005 choir director and bandmaster at the Theater Ulm. In 2004, Netzer took over the artistic responsibility for the festival "Montafoner Sommer". From 2005 to 2009, he was choral director and bandmaster at the Tyrolean State Theatre. In December 2007, he was elected artistic director of the Musiktheater Vorarlberg, based in Götzis.

Netzer was also active as a freelance musician, mainly in the field of early music, among others with the orchestras "Armonico Tributo", "Wiener Akademie" and "Sol-sol-la-sol". He has worked with artists such as Joshua Rifkin, Konrad Junghänel, Andrew Parrott, Howard Arman and Martin Haselböck. Since October 2009, Netzer has been director of the Feldkirch Music School in Vorarlberg.

The conductor is married to the soprano Vera Schoenenberg. The couple has two sons.
