= Vera Schoenenberg =

German operatic soprano (born 1973)

- Born: 1973 (age 51–52); Plettenberg, Germany
- Education: Musikhochschule Köln; Robert Schumann Hochschule
- Occupations: Soprano; Academic voice teacher
- Organizations: Theater Ulm; Mozarteum

Vera Schoenenberg (born 1973) is a German soprano in opera, operetta, Lied and oratorio, and a lecturer at the Mozarteum University Salzburg.

== Life ==
Born in Plettenberg, Schoenenberg studied school music at the Hochschule für Musik und Tanz Köln where she was in the voice class of Klesie Kelly. She then studied opera singing at the Robert Schumann Hochschule in Düsseldorf from 1997 until 2000 with Ingeborg Reichelt. Schoenenberg took master classes in opera with Tamar Rachum, Richard Miller and Brigitte Fassbaender, and in oratorio with Ingeborg Danz.

Schoenenberg had her first engagement at the Junge Kammeroper Köln, where she made her stage debut in 1998 as First Lady in Mozart's Die Zauberflöte in a production presented in several cities in Germany. In 1999, she performed the title role in Puccini's Suor Angelica. She was awarded a scholarship at the Bayreuth Festival from the Richard-Wagner-Verband in 2000.

From 2001 to 2006, Schoenenberg was a member of the ensemble of the Theater Ulm. She first performed there in the title role of Verdi's La traviata. Other roles were Lisa in Lehár's Das Land des Lächelns, Eurydice in Offenbach's Orpheus in der Unterwelt, Ilia in Mozart's Idomeneo, the title role in Kálmán's Die Csárdásfürstin, Jenny in Weill's Rise and Fall of the City of Mahagonny, Micaëla in Bizet's Carmen, Josabeth in Handel's Athalia, Bianca in Zemlinsky's Eine florentinische Tragödie, and Donna Anna in Mozart's Don Giovanni, among others.

Schoenenberg has performed as a guest, at the Theater Augsburg, Theater Basel (as La traviata), at the Gamle Logen in Oslo (as Angelica), and at Historisches Stadttheater Weißenhorn (as Bastienne in Mozart's Bastien und Bastienne). She appeared as Csárdásfürstin at the Seefestspiele Mörbisch (Mörbisch Lake Festival) in 2002, as Gräfin Mariza at the Landestheater Innsbruck from 2007, as Adina in Donizetti's L'elisir d'amore at the Meiningen Court Theatre from 2008, and as Corilla Sartinecchi in Donizetti's Le convenienze ed inconvenienze teatrali.

Schoenenberg has performed as a Lied and concert singer in Germany (among others at the Nymphenburger Sommer, the Konzerthaus Dortmund, the Alte Oper Frankfurt), Austria (among others Montafoner Musiksommer), France, Spain, Switzerland and Israel.

She appeared on television in the series "Musikkontakte" (Musical contacts) by NDR on the subject of operetta, with conductor Gerd Albrecht. Her performance in Csárdásfürstin at the Mörbisch Festival was broadcast by ORF, BR and 3sat.

Schoenenberg has been a lecturer in singing at the Mozarteum University Salzburg since 2009. She is married to the conductor Nikolaus Netzer.

== Recordings ==
- Cherubini: Les deux journées, with Andreas Schmidt (Naïve Records)
- Third Herbert von Karajan Memorial Concert in Ulm, 2003, live, with Leo Nucci and Stella Grigorian

=== DVD ===
- Die Csárdásfürstin, Mörbisch 2002 (Videoland)
