= Helbling House =

Coordinates: 47.26841°N 11.39291°E

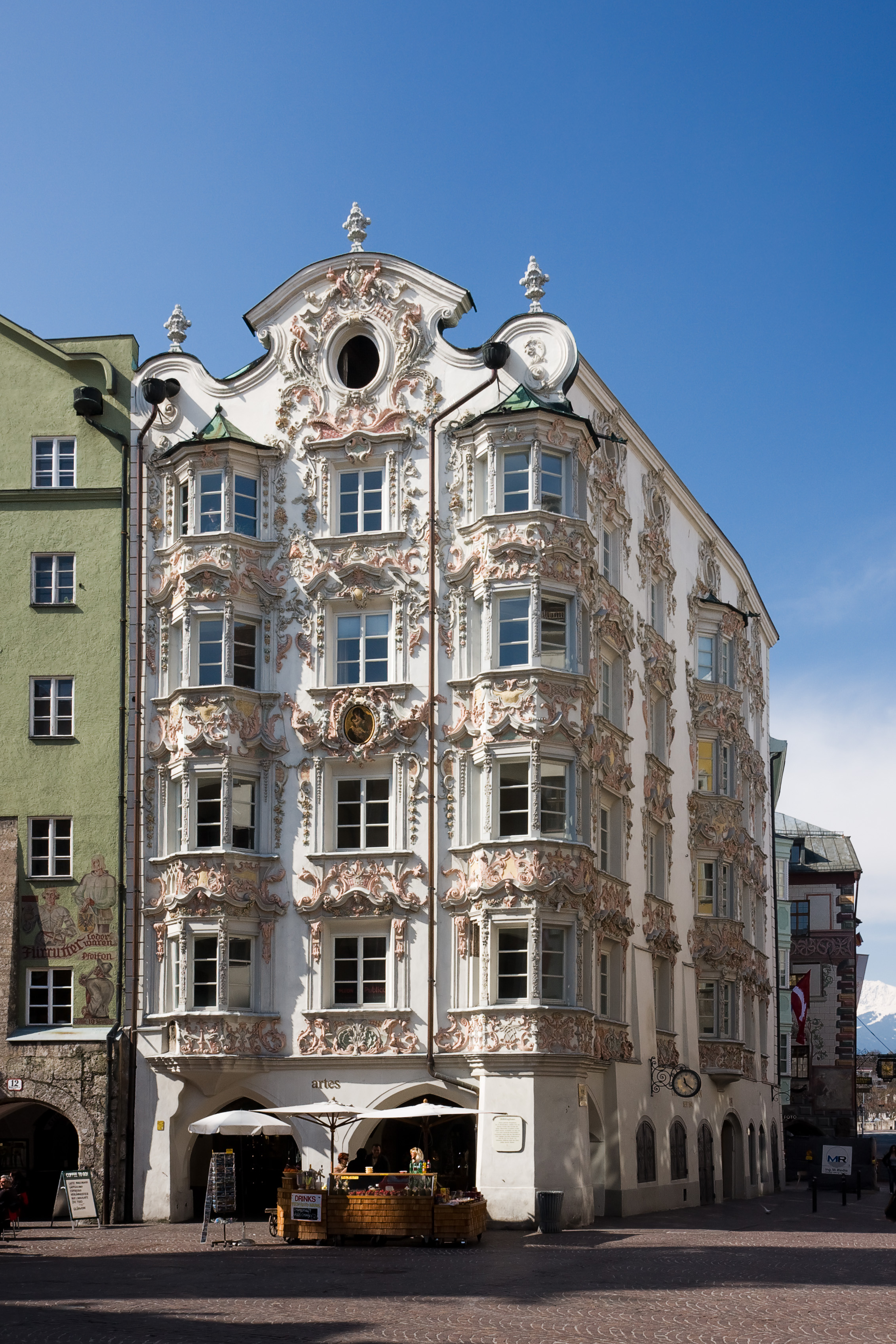
Helbling House

Helbling House (German: Helblinghaus) is a building located in the Old Town (Altstadt) section of Innsbruck, Austria, across from the Golden Roof (Goldenes Dachl) at Herzog-Friedrich-Strasse 10. The original structure was built in the fifteenth century, but evolved significantly with new architectural styles in subsequent centuries.

Originally constructed as townhouses, Helbling House was shaped by its early Gothic styles and Baroque façade. The "icing-like" Rococo stucco decorations added in the early eighteenth century—the bows, window frames, oriels, tympana, masks, sculptures, and shells—contributed to creating this unique building, whose design helps to capture the light. Helbling House was completed in 1732 by Anton Gigl. The building was named after Sebastian Helbling, who owned the building from 1800 to 1827.

== Gallery ==
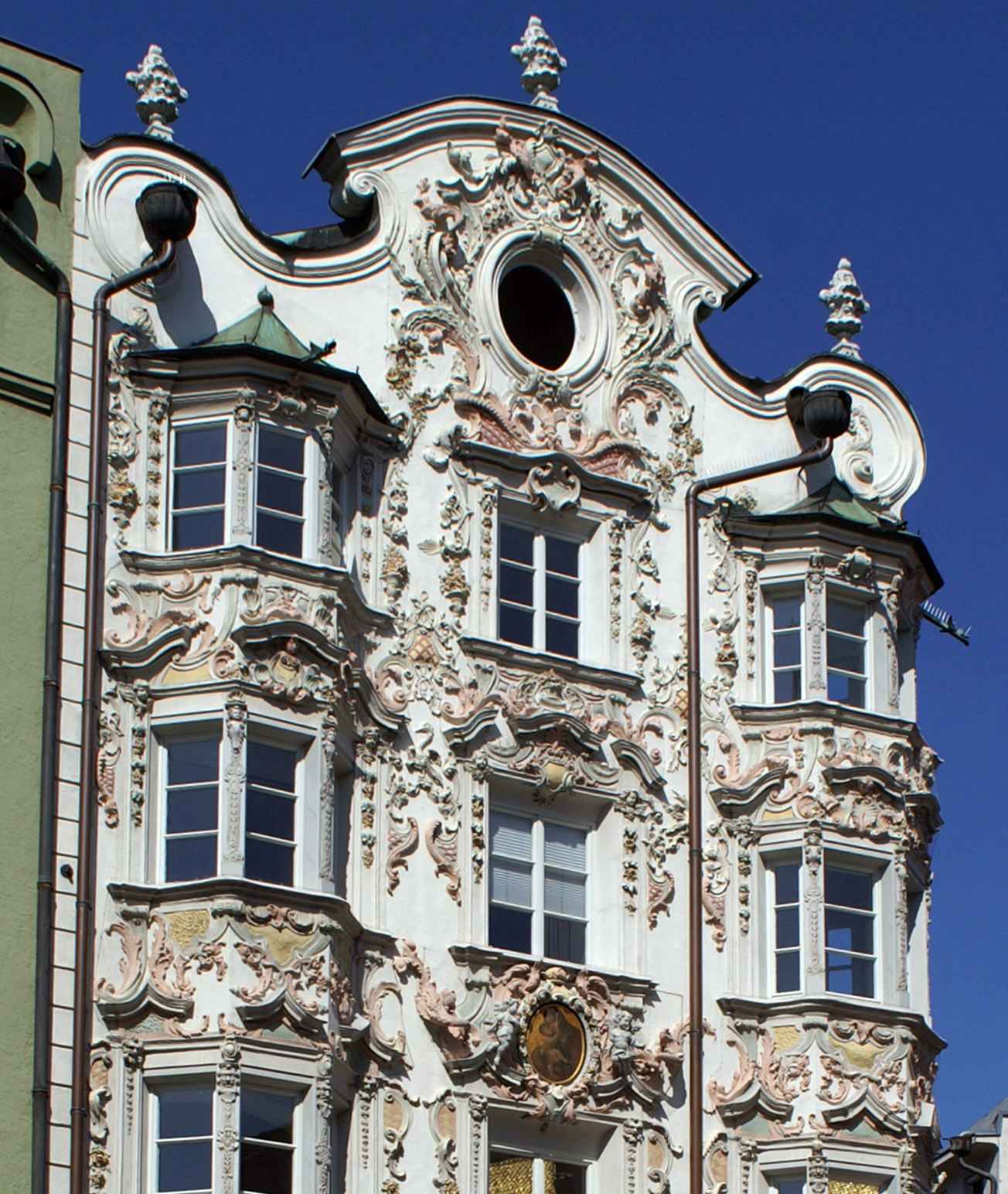
Upper section

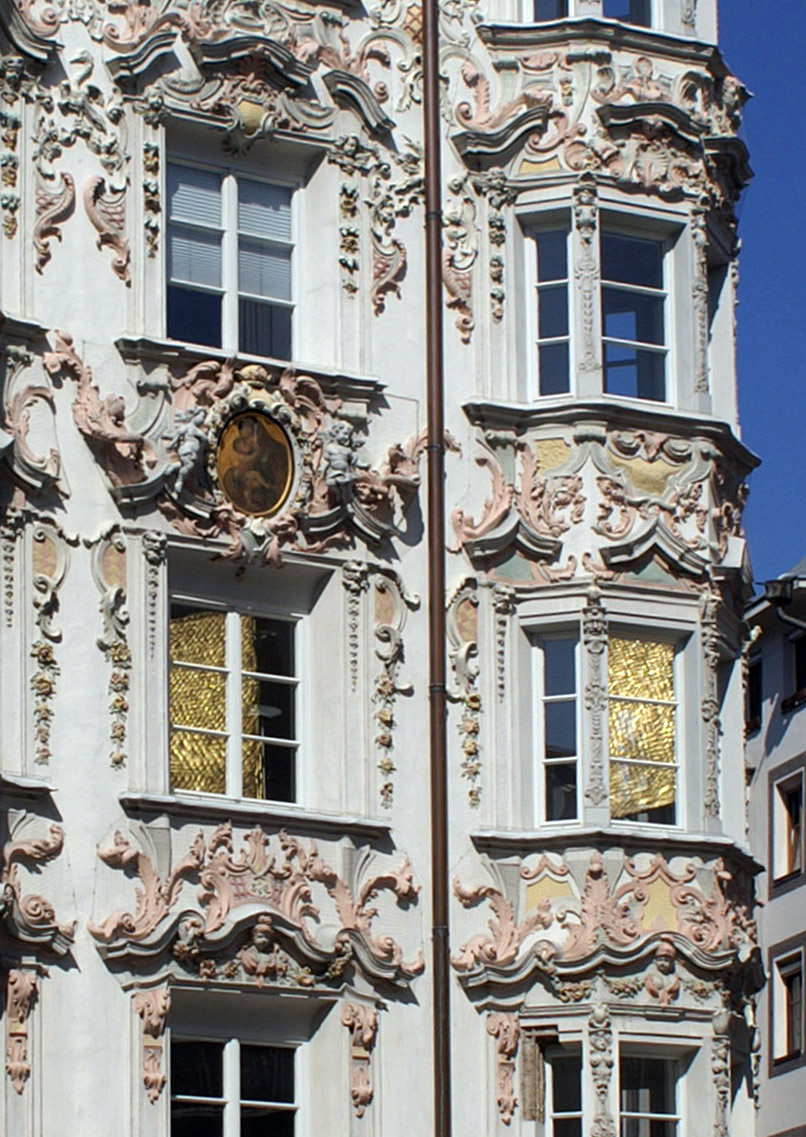
Detail
