= Leopold Fountain =

Coordinates: 47°16′8.76″N 11°23′44.2″E

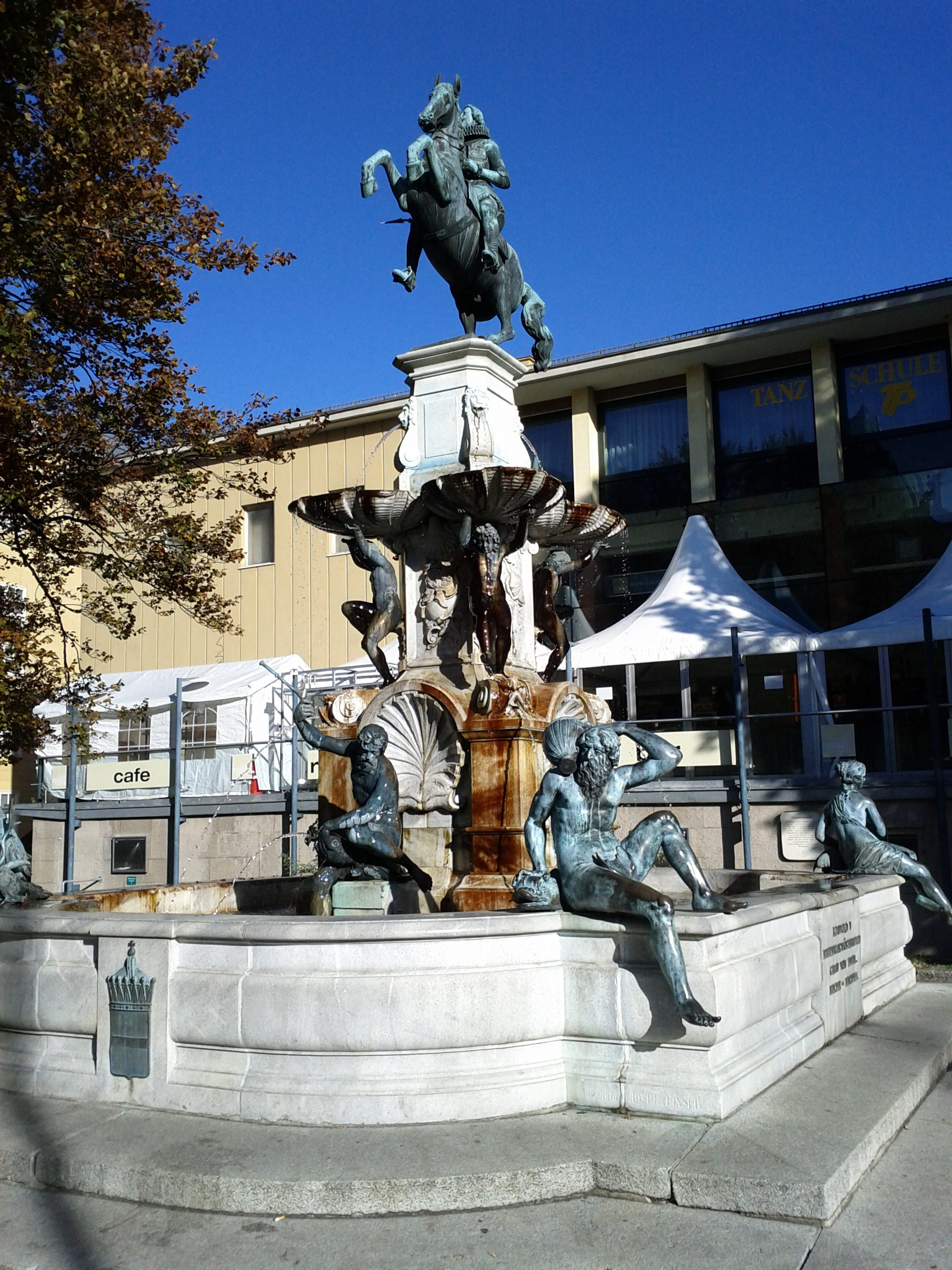
Leopold Fountain (2011)

The Leopold Fountain (German: Leopoldsbrunnen, more rarely Leopoldbrunnen) in the Tyrolean state capital is a listed monument near the Altstadt of the city of Innsbruck. The fountain, which is on the Rennweg and is not far from the Tyrolean State Theatre features an equestrian statue of Archduke Leopold V who lived from 1586 to 1632 and gave the fountain its name.

== History ==
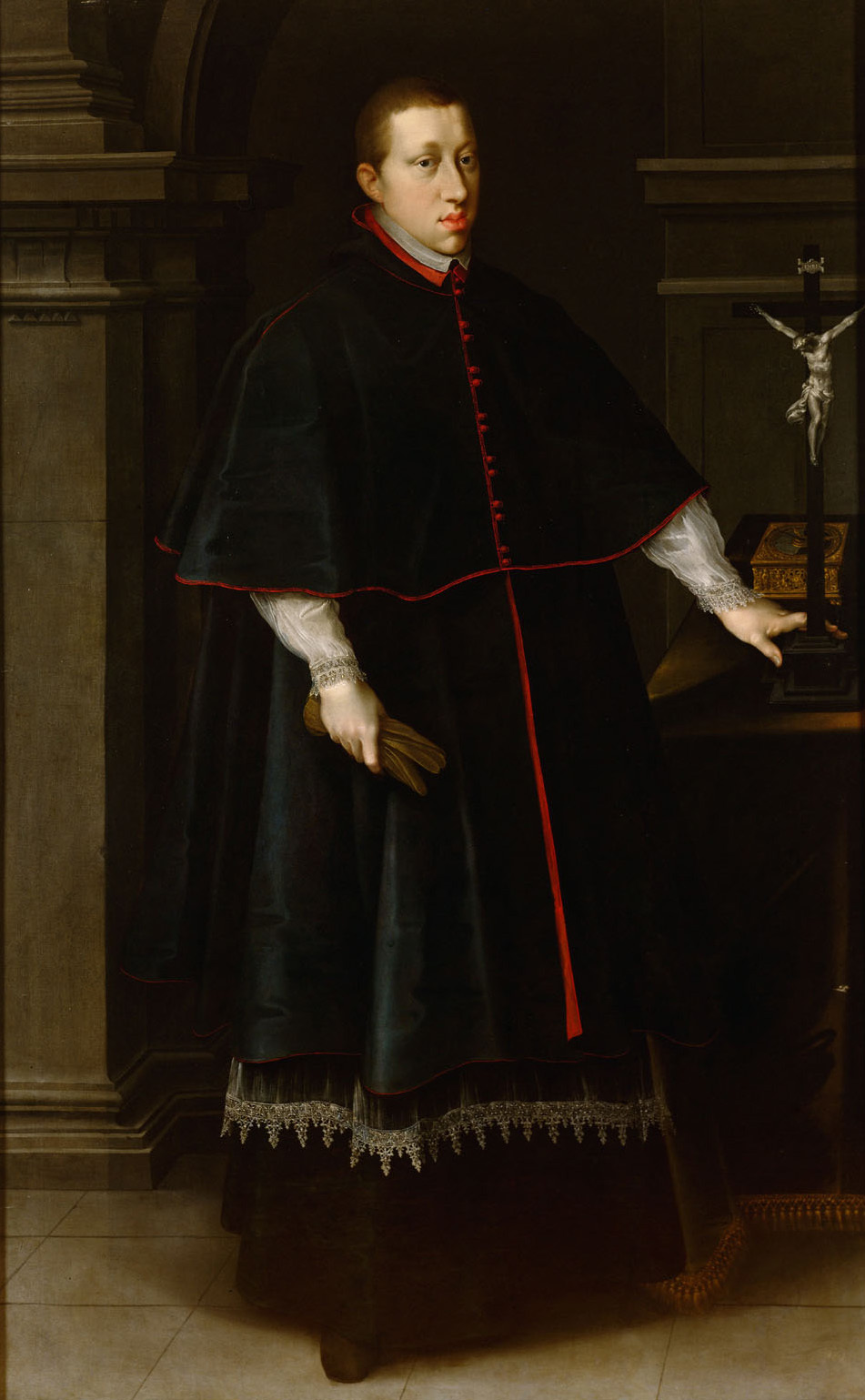
Archduke Leopold V, Prince of Tyrol from 1618 to 1632

As a symbol of his political claim to power, the then Archduke Leopold V had this fountain built between 1622 and 1630. However, not until 1893 did it assume its present appearance. This deviates from the, now missing original plan which was probably drawn up by court architect (Hofbaumeister) Christoph Gumpp.

In late summer 2015 the Leopold Fountain was dismantled as part of the demolition of the large building complex (city halls, chamber theatre, old dancing school of Polai, city café). It is still unknown where and when it will be reassembled in another location. On the site of the old building of the Innsbruck city halls, a "House of Music" has been built, which is due to open in 2018.
