= Hofgarten, Innsbruck =

Protected park in Innsbruck, Austria

Coordinates: 47°16′18″N 11°23′50″E

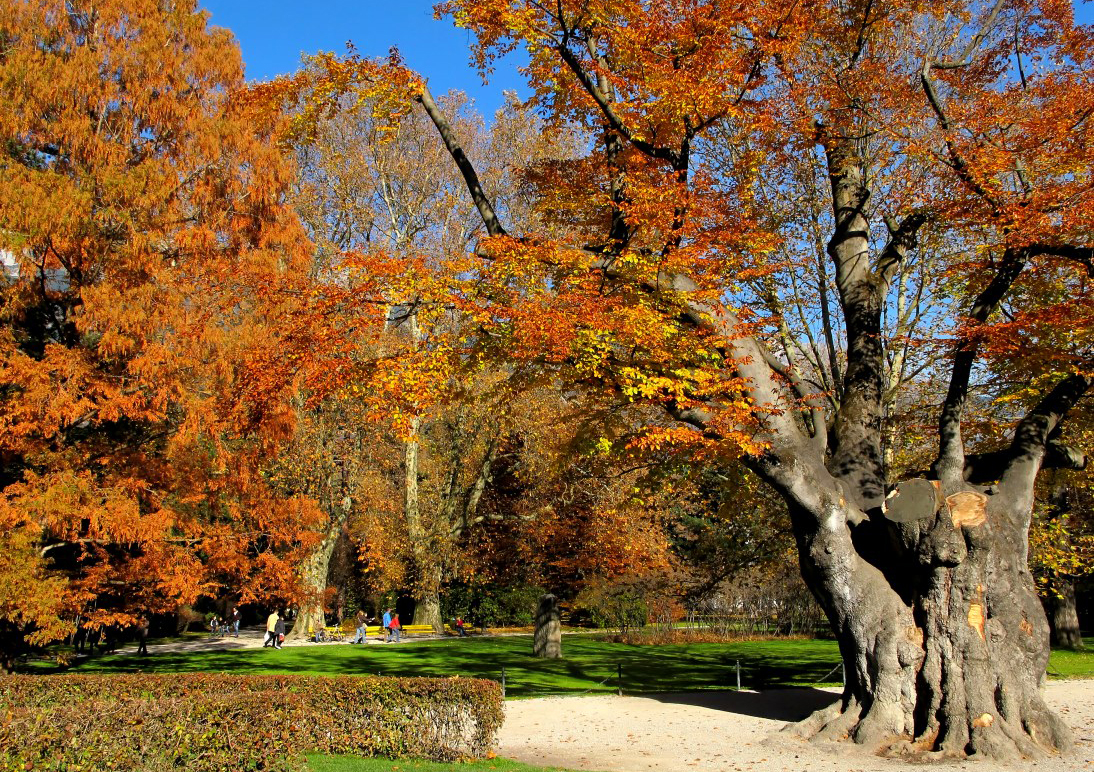
Hofgarten (Court Garden) in Innsbruck, Austria

The Hofgarten (English: Court Garden) is a protected park located on the edge of the Altstadt (Old Town) section of Innsbruck, Austria. The park covers an area of 10 hectares (25 acres), and borders on the Hofburg, the Kongresshaus, and the Tyrolean State Theatre.

The Hofgarten was originally laid out on the site of a river meadow under the direction of Ferdinand II, Archduke of Austria in the sixteenth century. At the time, it was one of the most elaborate gardens laid out north of the Alps. During its 600-year history, it was turned into a Renaissance garden, a French formal garden and, since 1858, an English landscape garden. Its last conversion was conceived by Friedrich Ludwig von Sckell, but carried out four decades later by an unknown landscape designer who deviated significantly from Sckell's original proposal.

The Hofgarten is managed by the Austrian Federal Gardens (Österreichischen Bundesgärten), a subordinate department of the Ministry of the Environment (Bundesministerium für Land- und Forstwirtschaft, Umwelt und Wasserwirtschaft).

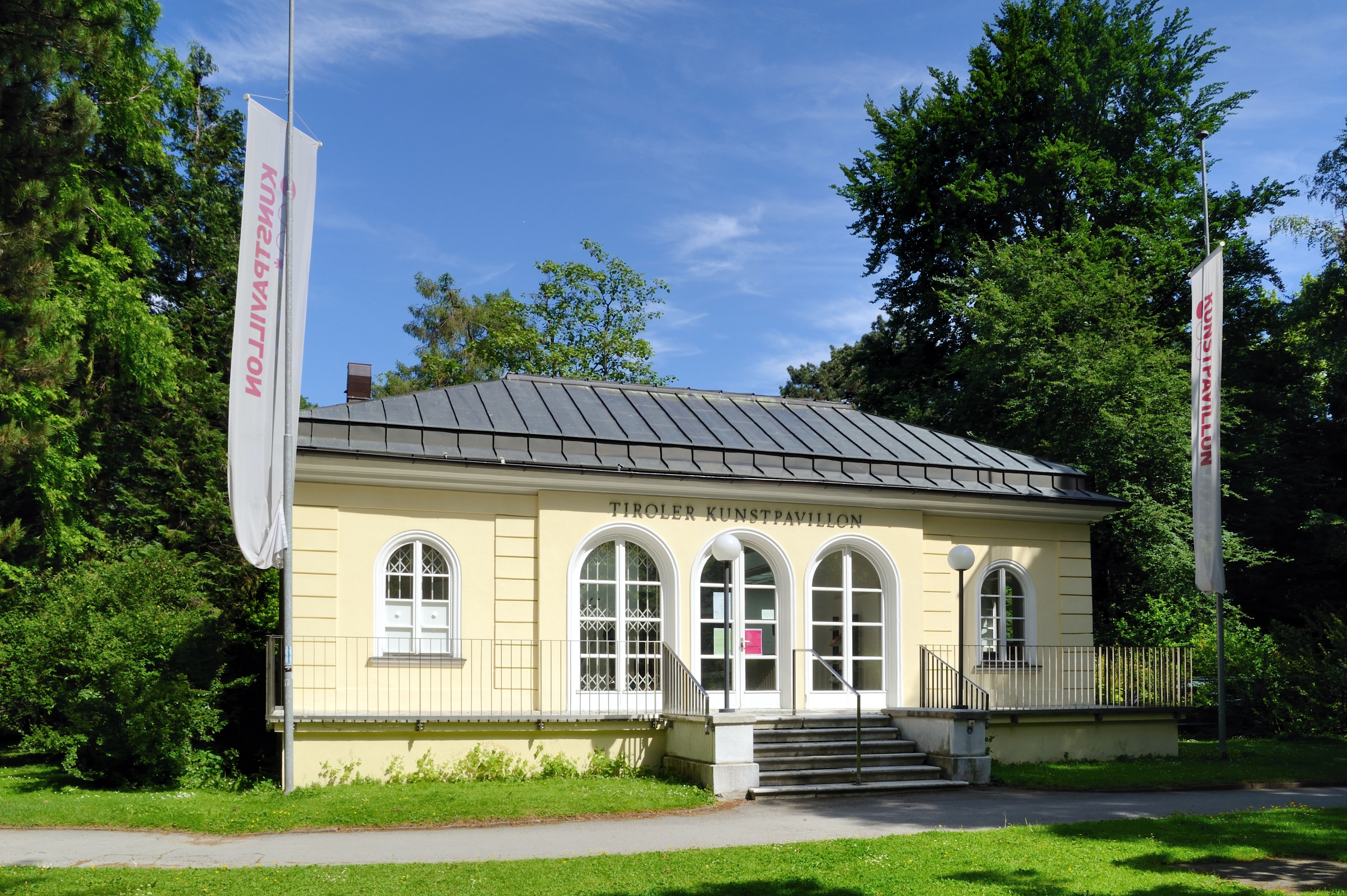
Tiroler Kunstpavillon in the Hofgarten

The Hofgarten is a recreation area within the Old Town with an interesting and varied stock of mature trees, a set of ponds, a modern children's playpark, a palm house, and a popular garden restaurant.

The Hofgarten management is responsible for taking care of the park. It is notable that there are still plants in the park that were planted personally by the Austrian Empress, Maria Theresa. The Tiroler Kunstpavillon (Tyrolean Art Pavilion) in the middle of the park dates back to 1733. Today, the pavilion supports numerous events—mainly concerts. Chess tournaments are fought on the outsize chess boards next to the pavilion.

There is a lawn for sunbathing in the Hofgarten with a children's playpark. Otherwise walking on the ornate lawns is not permitted because they are susceptible to excessive use.

The palm house contains a comprehensive collection of about 1,700 species of plant, which may be viewed mostly on working days. During the temporary art and sculpture exhibitions in the summer season the palm house may also be visited at weekends.
