= Karl Österreicher =

Austrian conductor

Karl Österreicher (3 January 1923 – 11 March 1995) was an Austrian conductor and music teacher.

== Life ==
Born in Rohrbach an der Gölsen, Lower Austria, Austrian studied clarinet as well as conducting with Hans Swarowsky, later also with Alfred Uhl and Clemens Krauss from 1946 at the then University of Music and Performing Arts Vienna with the Vienna Philharmonic clarinettist Leopold Wlach (1902-1956).

Österreicher served as director of the university orchestra of the University of Music from 1964, and from 1969 to 1992 he was also a professor at the University of Music and Performing Arts Vienna. His students include Alexis Agrafiotis, Tetsurō Ban, Eugen Brixel, Donald Covert, Erke Duit, Carlos Kalmar, Jesus Lopez-Cobos, Michael Kapsner, Dmitri Kitayenko, Michael Lessky, Luis Antonio García Navarro, Matthias Manasi, Guido Mancusi, Luis Antonio García Navarro, Daniel Nazareth, Nikolaus Netzer, Arild Remmereit, René Staar, Alexander Steinitz, Nayden Todorov and Claudius Traunfellner.

His daughter from his marriage to the singer Sieglinde Wetzelsberger is the actress and director Isabella Gregor.

Austrian died in St. Pölten, (Lower Austria) at the age of 72.

== Awards ==
- 1976: Großes Silbernes Decoration of Honour for Services to the Republic of Austria
- 1978: Niederösterreichischer Kulturpreis
- 1981: Austrian Decoration for Science and Art I. Class
- 1988: Ehrenmedaille der Bundeshauptstadt Wien in Gold
