= Michael Lessky =

Austrian conductor (born 1960)

Michael Lessky (born 16 August 1960) is an Austrian conductor.

== Life ==
Lessky was born in Vienna as the son of Friedrich Lessky and first studied piano, organ and church music at the Diözesankonservatorium für Kirchenmusik der Erzdiözese Wien and jazz harmony at the Music and Arts University of the City of Vienna. In 1986, he began his conductor training with Karl Österreicher at the Vienna Academy of Music, which he completed in 1992. Between 1991 and 1995, he was a guest conductor with Claudio Abbado at the Vienna State Opera and the Gustav Mahler Youth Orchestra.

He made his debut with the Austrian-Hungarian Haydn Philharmonic and the soloists Ildikó Raimondi, Hans Peter Blochwitz and Bernd Weikl in 1995 with Joseph Haydn's oratorio Die Schöpfung at the Wiener Musikverein.

In 1983, Lessky founded the Capella Francescana and in 1997 the Junge Philharmonie Wien. In 1999 and 2000, he was artistic director of the Opera at the Quarry St. Margarethen and conducted productions of The Magic Flute and Nabucco there. He completed performances and created CD productions with international soloists at home and abroad, focusing on the works of Franz Schubert, Gustav Mahler and Anton Bruckner.
