= Alexis Agrafiotis =

German composer and conductor

- Αλέξης Αγραφιώτης
- Born: 1970 (age 55–56); Salzburg, Austria
- Education: University of Music and Performing Arts Vienna; Athenaeum Conservatory, Vienna University of Music
- Occupations: Composer, conductor, pianist
- Known for: Contemporary music, orchestral and chamber compositions

Alexis Agrafiotis (born 1970) is a German-Greek composer, conductor and pianist.

== Life ==
Alexis Agrafiotis was born the son of conductor Dimitris Agrafiotis and Evangelia Syngelakis. Soon after his birth in Salzburg, the family moved to Reutlingen, where his father became principal conductor of the Württembergische Philharmonie Reutlingen. In 1978, the family moved to Ettlingen, where he attended primary school and the Albertus-Magnus-Gymnasium Ettlingen. He attended the last two years of secondary school at the German School of Athens (Abitur 1989).

He graduated in piano at the Athens Conservatory "Athenaeum" and studied Orchestra Conducting with Uros Lajovic and Composition with Erich Urbanner (magister artium 1995 and 1996) at the University of Music and Performing Arts Vienna. He attended courses with Roland Seiffarth, Péter Eötvös and Karl Österreicher and was assistant to Gunther Schuller, Rüdiger Bohn and Hans Drewanz. Stations as a solo répétiteur and conductor took him to the theatres in Görlitz, Lübeck, Bern, the Zeitgenössische Oper Berlin and the Theater Bielefeld.

From 2011 to 2017 he was engaged as director of studies and Kapellmeister at the Mainfranken Theater Würzburg. Since December 2017, he has been engaged as solo répétiteur and conductor at the Staatstheater Braunschweig.

As a guest conductor, he has worked with the Tonkünstler Orchestra of Lower Austria, the Karlovy Vary Symphony Orchestra (Czech Republic), the Philharmonic Orchestra of Győr (Hungary), the Prussian Chamber Orchestra of Prenzlau and the Philharmonic Orchestra of the Cities of Ulm and Lübeck, and is guest conductor of all the major orchestras in Greece: Thessaloniki City Orchestra, Thessaloniki State Orchestra, Athens State Orchestra, Athens Radio Orchestra and Athens National Opera. From 2006 to 2007 he was chief conductor of the Symphony Orchestra of the city of Volos in Greece.

He is also active in teaching: from 2004 to 2006 he held teaching posts at the conservatoires in Bremen (vocal department) and Weimar (opera studio), again in Bremen from 2007 to 2011 and from WS 2012/13 at the Hochschule für Musik Würzburg.

Αs a pianist he has performed concertos by Wolfgang Amadeus Mozart, Ludwig van Beethoven, Alexander Scriabin and Richard Strauss (Burleske), among others. He has simultaneously conducted the piano concertos of Robert Schumann and Arthur Honegger (Concertino) from the piano. He is also active as a Lied accompanist.

His oeuvre includes chamber music, vocal music, works for orchestra (including two piano concertos) and theatre music. In Baden-Baden he had a working residency at the Brahmshaus. He is a member of the Greek Composers' Association.

One focus of his work is contemporary music. As a conductor, he has repeatedly conducted concerts exclusively of Neue Musik with the Thessaloniki State Orchestra, the Athens Radio Orchestra, the Greek Ensemble of Contemporary Music, the Ensemble of the University of the Arts Bern and the German-Polish Ensemble in Schloss Trebnitz under the auspices of the German Music Council. He had the musical and scenic direction in productions with works by Mauricio Kagel, Kurt Schwitters, John Cage and Jani Christou.

Agrafiotis was responsible for the musical rehearsal of important works of the new music theatre, including compositions by Salvatore Sciarrino, Sir Peter Maxwell Davies, Hans Zender, Wolfgang Rihm, Aulis Sallinen, Christian Jost, Reinhard Febel, Anno Schreier and Alois Bröder.

== Work ==
- Concerto for Piano and Orchestra (1994), commissioned by Athens Radio.
- Chamber Concerto for Piano and 12 Players (1995), commissioned by the Megaron Mousikis, Athens
- Symphony in one movement (1999)
- Music for violoncello and 7 players (2000)
- 5 Greek Dances for orchestra (2000)
- 5 Songs for Tenor and Piano after Poems by Paul Celan (2002)
- 8 Etudes for solo violin and CD (2003)
- Trio for violoncello, flute and piano (2004)
- String Quartet (2006)
- "In Orientes Brand" for mixed choir a cappella after a poem by Christian Filips (2006)
- "Erinnerung I" for 2 pianos (2007)
- Erinnerung II" for ensemble (2008)
- 3 Lieder für Mezzosopran und Ensemble
- 2 songs for baritone and piano after poems by Amal al-Jubouri (2008)
- Salve Regina for four-part children's choir (2009)
- 4 songs for soprano and piano after poems by Kim Chi-ha (2010)
- 4 songs for tenor, clarinet and string quartet after poems by Dimitra Ch. Christodoulou (2012)
- 4 songs for bass, oboe, clarinet, violoncello and double bass after poems by Dimitris Agrafiotis (2014)
