= Hofburg, Innsbruck =

Former Habsburg palace in Austria

Coordinates: 47.268889°N 11.394444°E

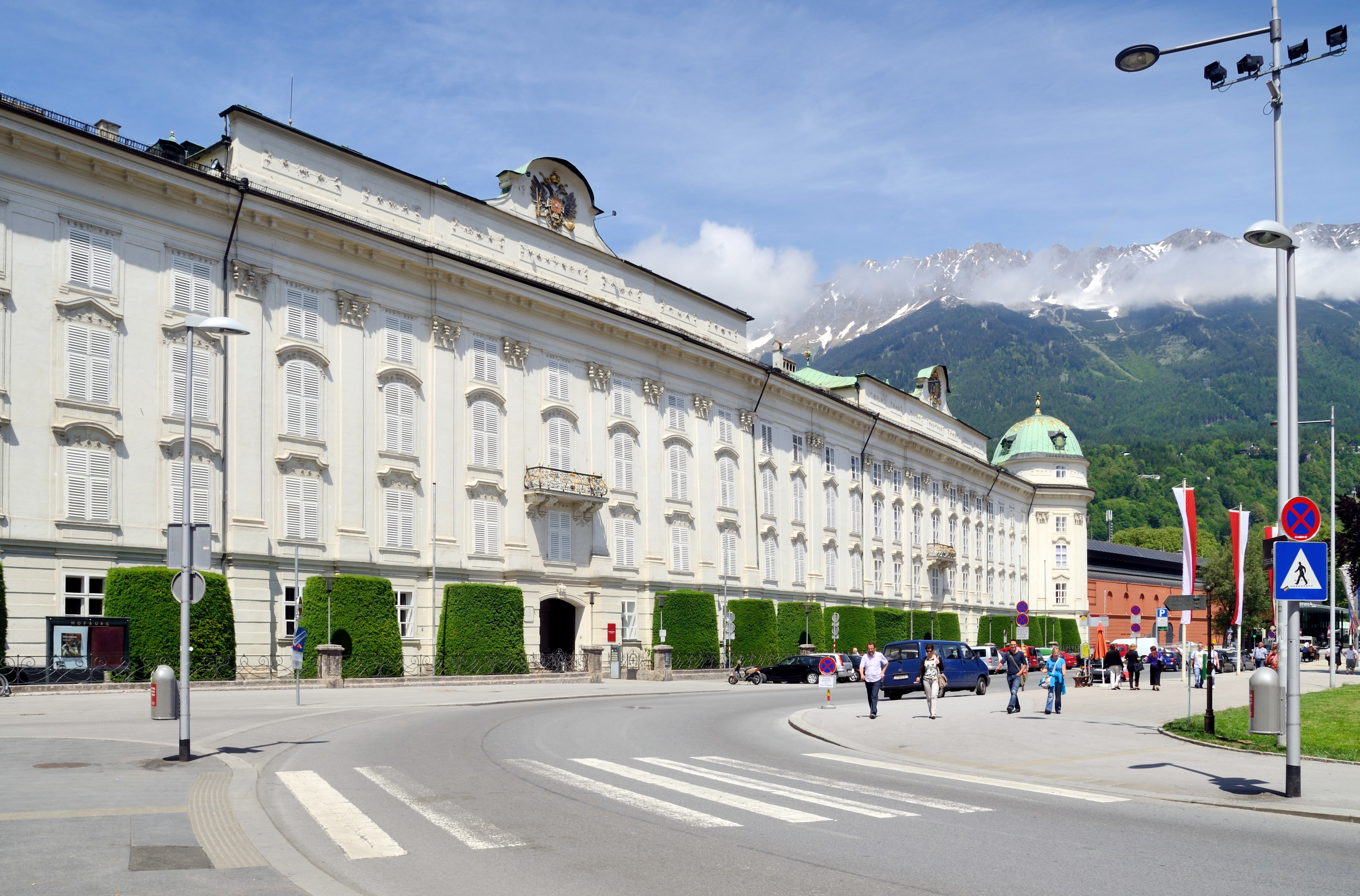
Hofburg in Innsbruck, Austria

The Hofburg (English: Court Castle) is a former Habsburg palace in Innsbruck, Austria, and considered one of the three most significant cultural buildings in the country, along with the Hofburg Palace and Schönbrunn Palace in Vienna. The Hofburg is the main building of a large residential complex once used by the Habsburgs that still includes the Noblewomen's Collegiate Foundation, the Silver Chapel, the Hofkirche containing Emperor Maximilian's cenotaph and the Schwarzen Mandern, the Theological University, the Tyrolean Folk Art Museum, Innsbruck Cathedral, the Congress, and the Hofgarten (Court Garden).

The original Hofburg palace was constructed from several elements under Archduke Sigismund around 1460. This structure included sections of medieval fortifications that ran along the eastern city wall. The building incorporated the Rumer Gate, which was later converted into the Heraldic Tower in 1499 by Jörg Kölderer under Emperor Maximilian I. The palace was expanded several times during the next 250 years. Between 1754 and 1773, the Hofburg palace underwent two stages of Baroque structural changes under Empress Maria Theresa: the south tract was constructed (1754–1756) on the Hofgasse according to plans by J. M. Gumpp the Younger, and the main façade was added (1766–1773) on the Rennweg according to plans by C. J. Walter. During this period, the Giants' Hall was completed with ceiling frescoes by Franz Anton Maulbertsch, and the Imperial Chapel was built (1765) in the room where Maria Theresa's husband Emperor Francis I had died.

Today, the Hofburg contains five themed museum areas: Maria Theresa's Rooms from the eighteenth century, Empress Elisabeth's Apartment from the nineteenth century, a Furniture Museum, an Ancestral Gallery, and a Painting Gallery. These themed museum areas illustrate various aspects of the political and cultural history of the former imperial palace, which remained in the possession of the Habsburgs for more than 450 years.

== History ==
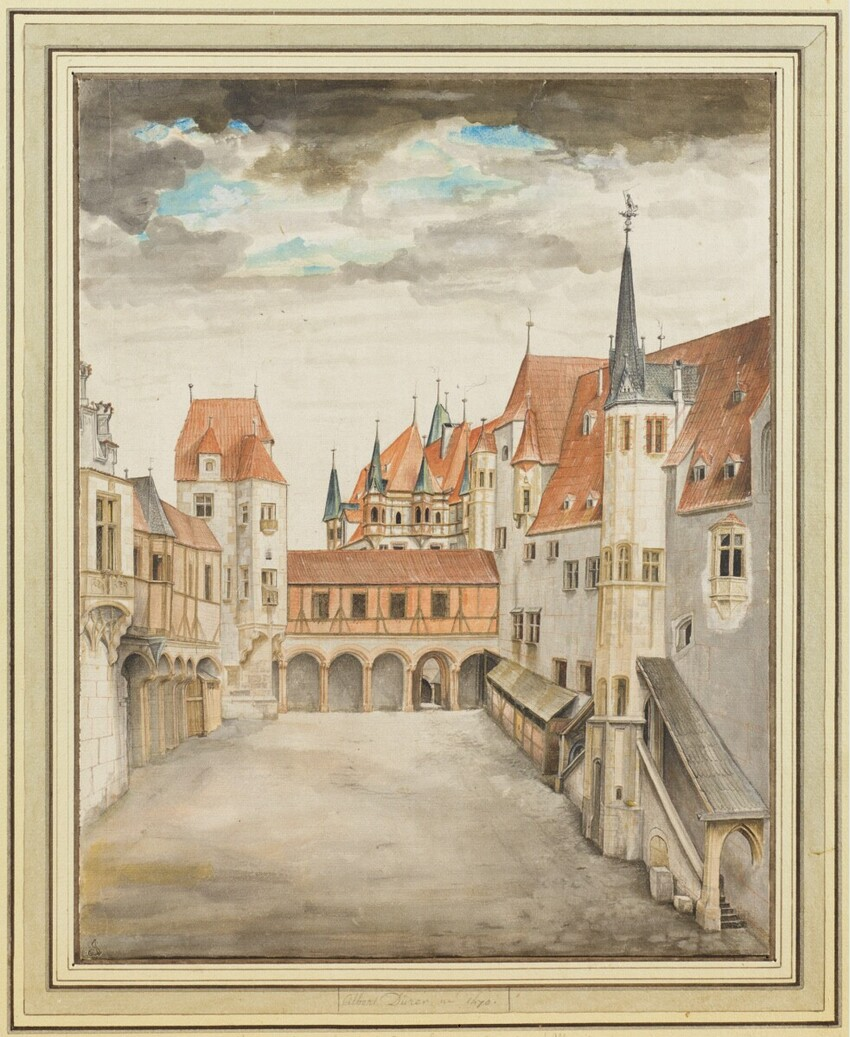
Innsbruck Castle Courtyard by Albrecht Dürer, 1495

The Hofburg was built on a site once occupied by the fortifications and towers of the medieval city. In the fourteenth century, when Innsbruck was ruled by the House of Gorizia, the city's defensive walls included a section located where the Hofburg main façade stands today on Rennweg. Three structural elements of these early fortifications were retained and integrated into the palace: the South Roundel with its Hofgasse-Rennweg passageway on the eastern side of the palace was once called the Rumer Gate or Saggen Gate or Heraldic Tower, the North Roundel on the northeastern side was once a round tower, and the Corner Cabinet museum room was once a rectangular defensive tower. The town wall ran from the Rumer Gate to the round tower and continued west the rectangular tower, which can still be seen in the Hofburg façade as an irregularly projecting corner block.

In 1361, the House of Habsburg began its rule of Tyrol. Between 1395 and 1406, Leopold IV, Duke of Austria (1371–1411) began purchasing houses and properties in the area of the palace, as well as two gardens that lay outside the town walls—the present-day Court Garden. In 1406, Leopold's brother Frederick IV, Duke of Austria (called Frederick with the Empty Pockets) became ruler of Tyrol. Frederick moved the seat of rule from Meran in present-day South Tyrol to Innsbruck, and constructed his New Residence, the building with the Goldenes Dachl west of the Hofburg area.

In 1446, Sigismund, Archduke of Austria (1427–1496) became ruler of Tyrol and reigned during a time of prosperity from mining operations in Tyrol. Sigismund expanded the Hofburg area through the acquisition of several houses on Hofgasse and various garden properties near the present-day cathedral. That year, construction of the Hofburg began with the foundations of the main building along the old trench (the southern section of the east wing along Rennweg) and a portion of the south wing (along Hofgasse). Rooms and a chapel in the east wing were completed, and according to tradition, a banquet was held in 1463 in a heated hall. A chancellery was built in the south wing (along Hofgasse). In the Rumer Gate, Sigismund added a room with large windows and a winding staircase where he installed a living room with wall coverings and a large bed. The Harnaschhaus (Armoury) was also added at this time (the present-day Stiftskeller) where suits of armour were produced and stored.

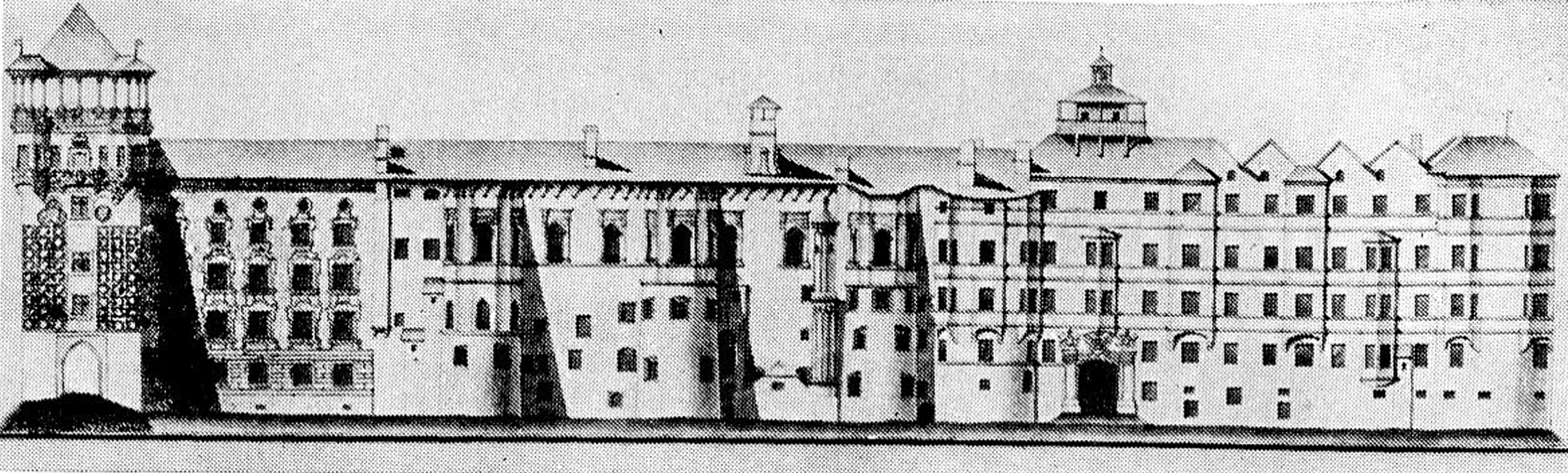
Hofburg prior to the Baroque reconstruction

The Hofburg was enlarged and expanded in the late Gothic style under Emperor Maximilian I (1459–1519), and soon gained the reputation as "the most beautiful building of the late Gothic period". In 1495, the palace was extended to the north of the building complex and was used as the residence of Maximilian's second wife Bianca Maria Sforza, whose dowry may have financed the work. During this phase of construction, the imperial apartments and the banquet hall were moved from the first upper floor to the second upper floor—the present location of the Giants' Hall (Riesensaal) and adjacent rooms. The entrance hall was also added to the north by the drawbridge. Maximilian's court master builder at the time was Nikolaus Thüring the Elder, who also built the Goldenes Dachl. Thüring was responsible for all planning and building construction. In 1499, the remnants of the Rumer Gate, which was destroyed by fire in 1494, were converted into the Heraldic Tower by Jörg Kölderer. The Hofburg inner courtyard is depicted in two watercolor paintings by Albrecht Dürer from 1495 and 1496.

Between 1520 and 1530, the Hofburg was transformed into an enclosed building complex with walled-in courtyards. Individual structures to the southwest, west, and north were consolidated and formed a single outer façade. The large and small courtyards, as well as the kitchen courtyard, were completed and reflected their current dimensions. These changes were designed by Georg Thüring, the son of Nikolaus Thüring. In 1533, the Hofburg became the permanent residence of Emperor Ferdinand I (1503–1564) and his family. In 1534, a fire destroyed sections of the Hofburg. Ferdinand brought in Italian architect Lucius de Spaciis to redesign the Hofburg east wing (along Rennweg) and create a new banquet hall. The high Gothic roofs were gradually replaced by flatter roofs covered by the gables of the early Renaissance façade.

The transformation of the Hofburg from a Gothic palace to a Renaissance castle was continued under Ferdinand II, Archduke of Austria (1529–1595), who brought in master builder Giovanni Lucchese to produce the renovations in the Italian style. Lucchese was also responsible for renovating Ambras Castle. Paintings were added to the courtyards, and the chancellery and council building were cleared for the emperor's use. Extensive murals were added to the former chancellery rooms by court painter Heinrich Teufel between 1567 and 1568. Expensive furniture was also added to the northeast corner tower, which became known as the Golden Tower (present-day North Roundel). In 1577, the Silberne Kapelle (Silver Chapel) was added to the connecting wing to the Hofkirche.

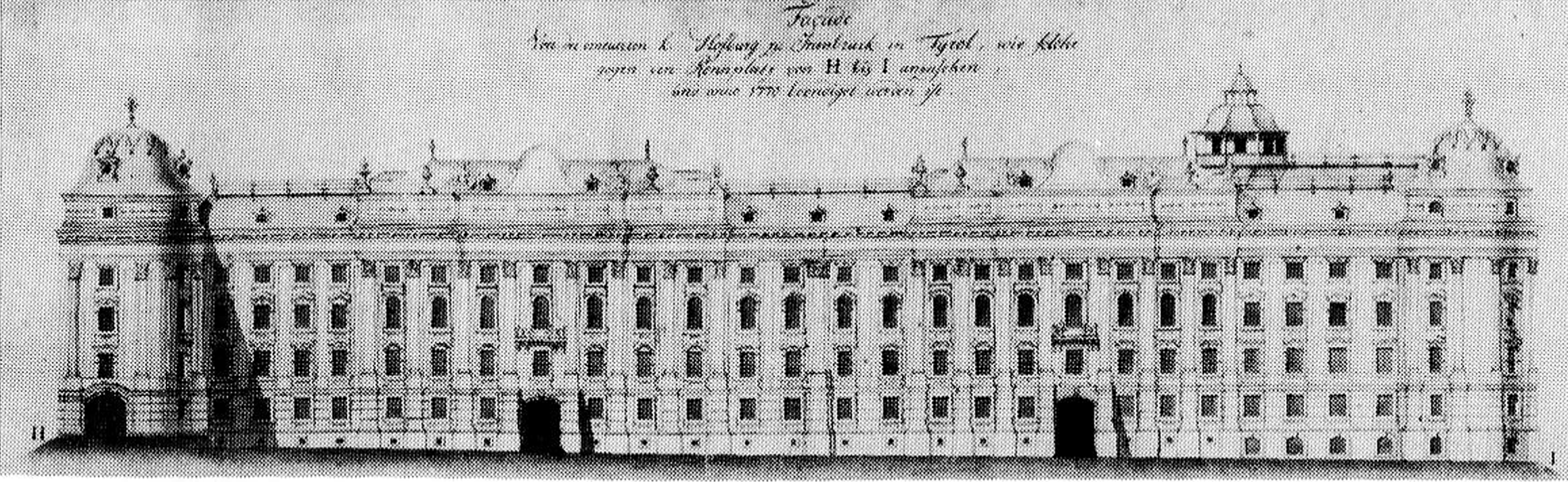
Hofburg after the Baroque reconstruction, 1779

During the seventeenth century, plans for further renovation under Leopold V, Archduke of Austria (1586–1632) and his successors were postponed because of the Thirty Years' War. During this period, the Hofburg fell into disrepair, with only critical repairs carried out. While the Hofburg continued to serve as the seat of royal offices, the royal family moved into Ruhelust Castle in the Hofgarten. By 1665, the Habsburg imperial family moved to Vienna, which became the central domain of the empire. The Hofburg in Innsbruck became an elegant but temporary lodging for members of the imperial family on their travels to the west. In 1711, Baroque painters Kaspar and Johann Joseph Waldmann from Tyrol were commissioned to paint the large hall (Giants' Hall).

During the eighteenth century, the Hofburg was transformed and renovated in the Baroque style under Empress Maria Theresa (1717–1780). The reconstruction project lasted from 1754 to 1776 and occurred in two phases, interrupted by the Seven Years' War (1754–1763). The first phase began with the submission of plans in 1754 by Johann Martin Gumpp the Younger, who was commissioned to create new offices in the south wing (along Hofgasse), add a large central staircase, standardize the floor levels and room heights, and remove narrow stairs and unnecessary walls to produce comfortable rooms with uniform flooring and evenly-spaced windows.

In 1765, following the end of the Seven Years' War, Maria Theresa selected Innsbruck as the site of the wedding of her son and future emperor Leopold II and Maria Luisa of Spain. In preparation for the wedding, residential rooms for the imperial couple were prepared in the newly renovated office wing, and additional rooms were prepared for the royal family in the southern rooms (Imperial Apartments), as well as the east and north wings. During the course of the wedding celebrations, Francis I died suddenly after returning from the theatre on 18 August 1765. For Maria Theresa, the Hofburg took on greater importance "as a memorial site and representational building" to honor her husband. Per the empress's instructions, the anteroom where Francis died was converted into the Hofburg Chapel in 1766.

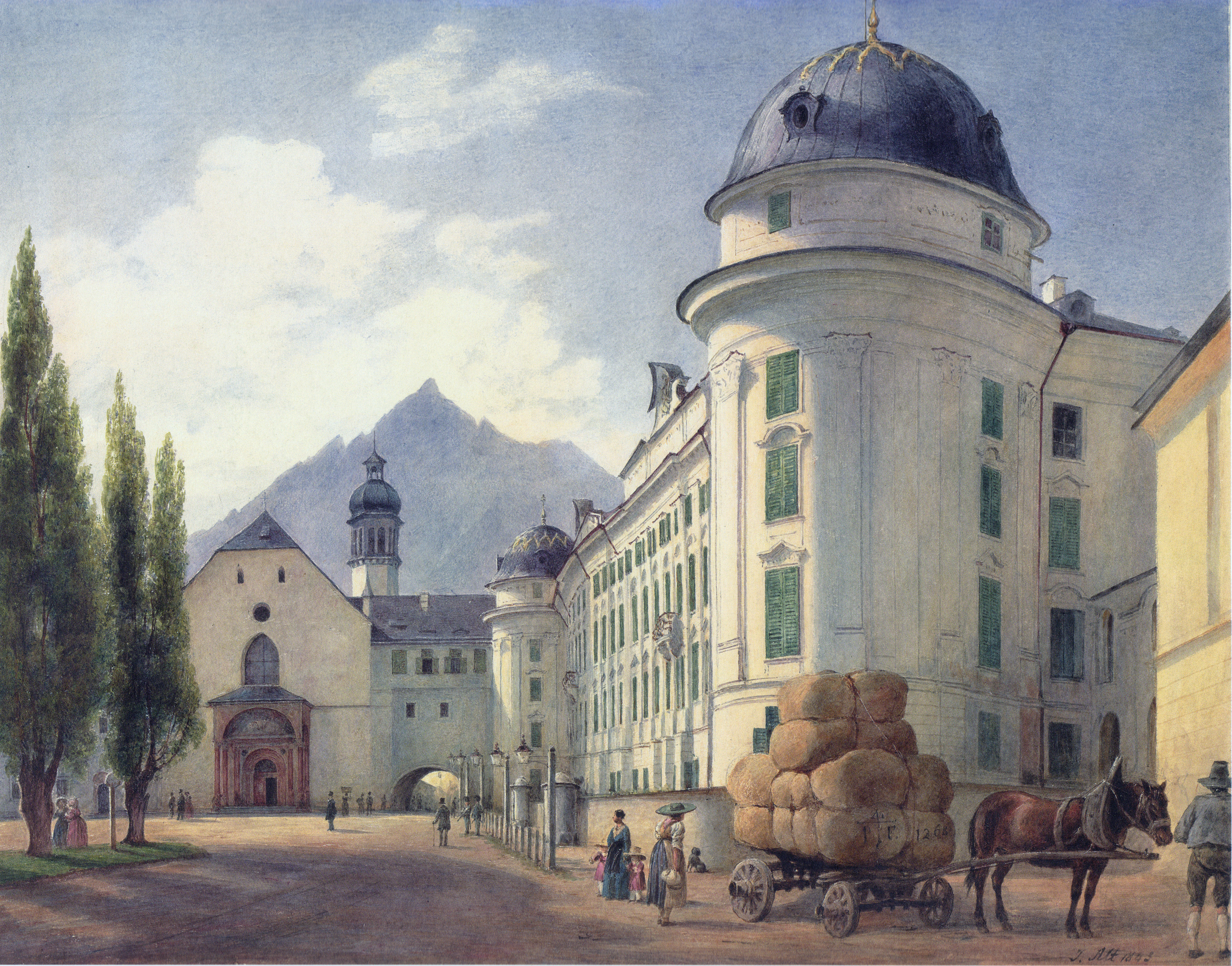
Watercolor by Jakob Alt, 1845

The east wing was redesigned to accommodate the newly founded Noblewomen's Collegiate Foundation. New ceilings were installed, court building director Constantin Johann Walter was named creative planner, and in 1767 Maria Theresa placed her court architect Nikolaus Pacassi—responsible for converting Schönbrunn Palace into a residential palace in Rococo style—in charge of the design and appearance of the main façade on Rennweg. After the roof framework was modified in 1774, the Giants' Hall ceiling fresco was executed by Franz Anton Maulbertsch, the master of Austrian Rococo, between 1775 and 1776. The result of this extended renovation project under Maria Theresa is the Hofburg we see today.

During the Napoleonic Wars, after the Habsburgs ceded Tyrol to Napoleon's Bavarian allies in 1805, the Hofburg became a residence of King Maximilian I Joseph of Bavaria (1756–1825). In 1809, the South Tyrolean innkeeper Andreas Hofer led an uprising against the occupying Bavarian administration, and following the successful Third Battle of Bergisel on 13 August 1809, Hofer moved into the Hofburg for two months, serving as the leader of Tyrol. After the Congress of Vienna, Tyrol was returned to Austria. In 1858, the last major reorganisation of the imperial apartments took place following the model of Schönbrunn Palace. Vienna court sculptor August La Vigne was commissioned to design the residential area in the Rococo style. Many of the furnishing added at that time are still in the imperial rooms today.

During the course of his long reign, Emperor Franz Joseph stayed at the Hofburg in Innsbruck on numerous occasions. Empress Elisabeth of Austria, however, stayed overnight at the Hofburg only once, on 14–15 October 1871. Other Habsburg archdukes, Franz Josef's uncle Ferdinand Karl (1818–1874), cousin Eugen (1863–1954), and nephew Heinrich Ferdinand (1878–1969) stayed for longer periods of time at the Hofburg imperial apartments during the late nineteenth and early twentieth century.

== Imperial Apartments ==
The following is a list of rooms in the Hofburg imperial apartments, starting at the Vestibule to the Chapel and moving counter-clockwise.

- The Vestibule to the Chapel contains mementos from the wedding of Leopold II and Maria Luisa of Spain in August 1765. The room contains a chasuble made from the nightdress of Emperor Francis I with the personal help of Empress Maria Theresa. The vestment bears the appliquéd imperial coats of arms of Hungary, Bohemia, Burgundy, and Tyrol on the outer front side, and the Austrian coat of arms on the inside. The initials "F.I." and "M.T." appear on the name tag. The vestibule also contains three large portrait paintings. The first is a full-length portrait of Maria Theresa as the foundress of the Noblewomen's Collegiate Foundation. Dressed in black window's garments, the empress is holding the insignia of the order in her right hand and showing the foundation document in her left hand. The two other portraits are of Archduchess Maria Elisabeth of Austria as abbess of the foundation, and a matching portrait of Emperor Joseph II in a white uniform jacket bearing the Order of the Golden Fleece and the Military Order of Maria Theresa.

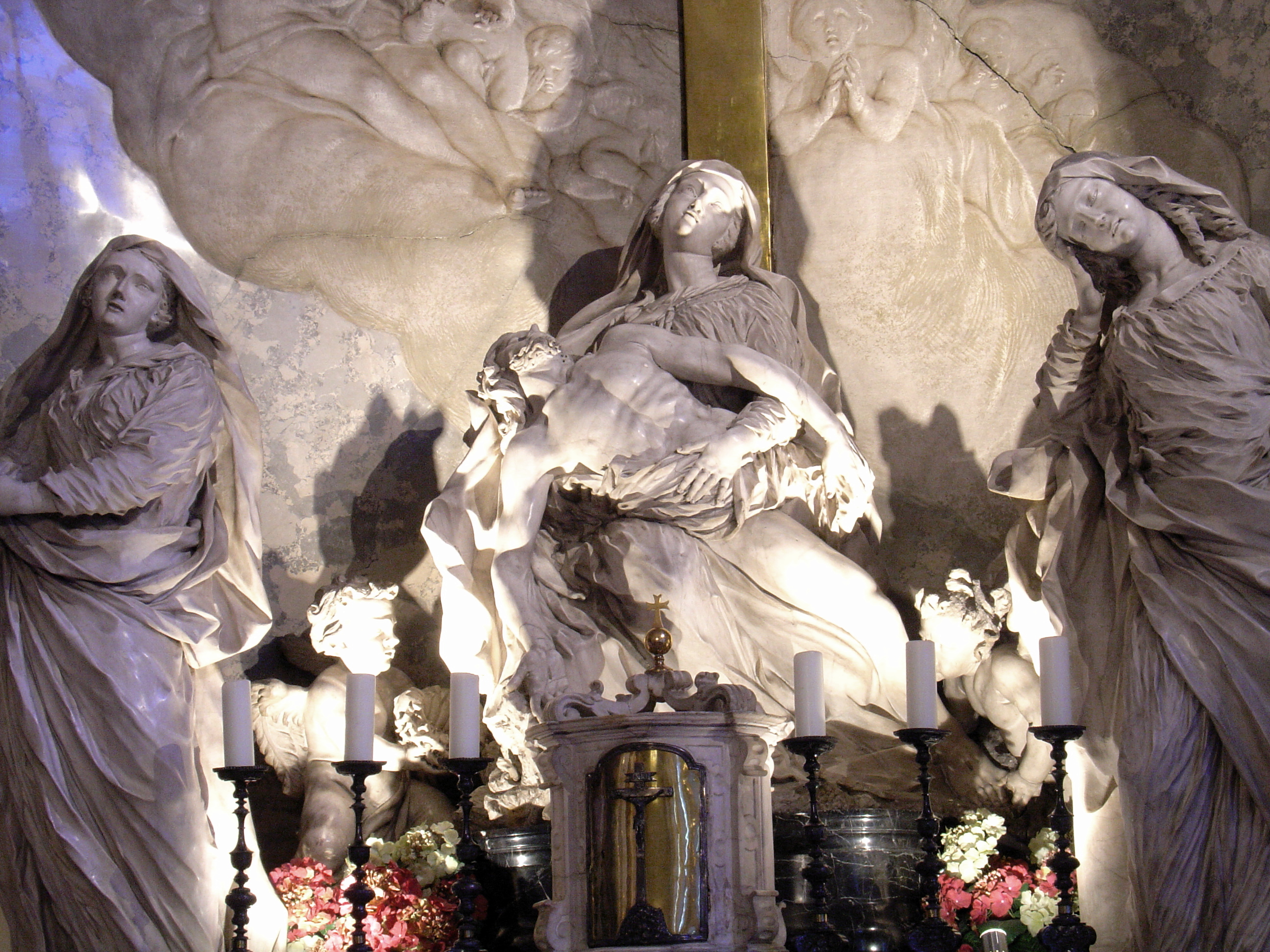
Hofburg Chapel altar by Anton Sartori, 1766

- The Hofburg Chapel was built in 1765 and 1766 in the room where Emperor Francis I died. During the wedding celebrations of Leopold II and Maria Luisa of Spain, the emperor died suddenly after returning from the theatre on 18 August 1765. For the mourning Maria Theresa, the Hofburg took on greater importance "as a memorial site" to honor her husband. Per her instructions, the room was converted into a chapel. The long rectangular chapel extends two stories to a flattened ceiling, with walls decorated in the Rococo style in white and gold. The apex of the altar niche bears a cartouche with a crowning scroll bearing the empress's initials "M.T." The back wall of the niche is adorned by a large gilt cross and a painted relief group by F. A. Leitensdorfer depicting God the Father surrounded by mourning angels. The altar supports a larger than life-size sculpture group showing the Blessed Virgin holding the lifeless body of Jesus in her arms flanked by two mourning female figures. The altar group was executed by Anton Sartori in 1766. The chapel contains an organ with six registers built by Matthias Maracher from Zell am Ziller in 1857. The two matching paintings along the window wall depicting The Visitation and Young Mary in the Temple were painted by Johann Georg Dominikus Grasmair in 1732 and 1733. The wood painting Jesus Embracing the Cross dates from the late sixteenth century.
- The Noblewomen's Collegiate Foundation was founded by Maria Theresa and is still active. The daughter of the imperial couple, Maria Elisabeth, served as the first and only abbess from 1781 to 1805.
- The South Tower was built as a heraldic tower around 1500 and became a landmark of the city.
- The Guard Hall (Gardesaal) was the first of four public rooms that Maria Theresa furnished and served as a reception room for the Giants' Hall. It was considered a part of the "men's side" of the palace. The paintings reflect a period of history at the Hofburg. Duke Charles V of Lorraine, through his notable military victories against the Turks, was instrumental in consolidating power for the House of Habsburg. He became the son-in-law of Emperor Ferdinand III through his marriage to Eleanor of Austria, whose portrait hangs on the window wall.

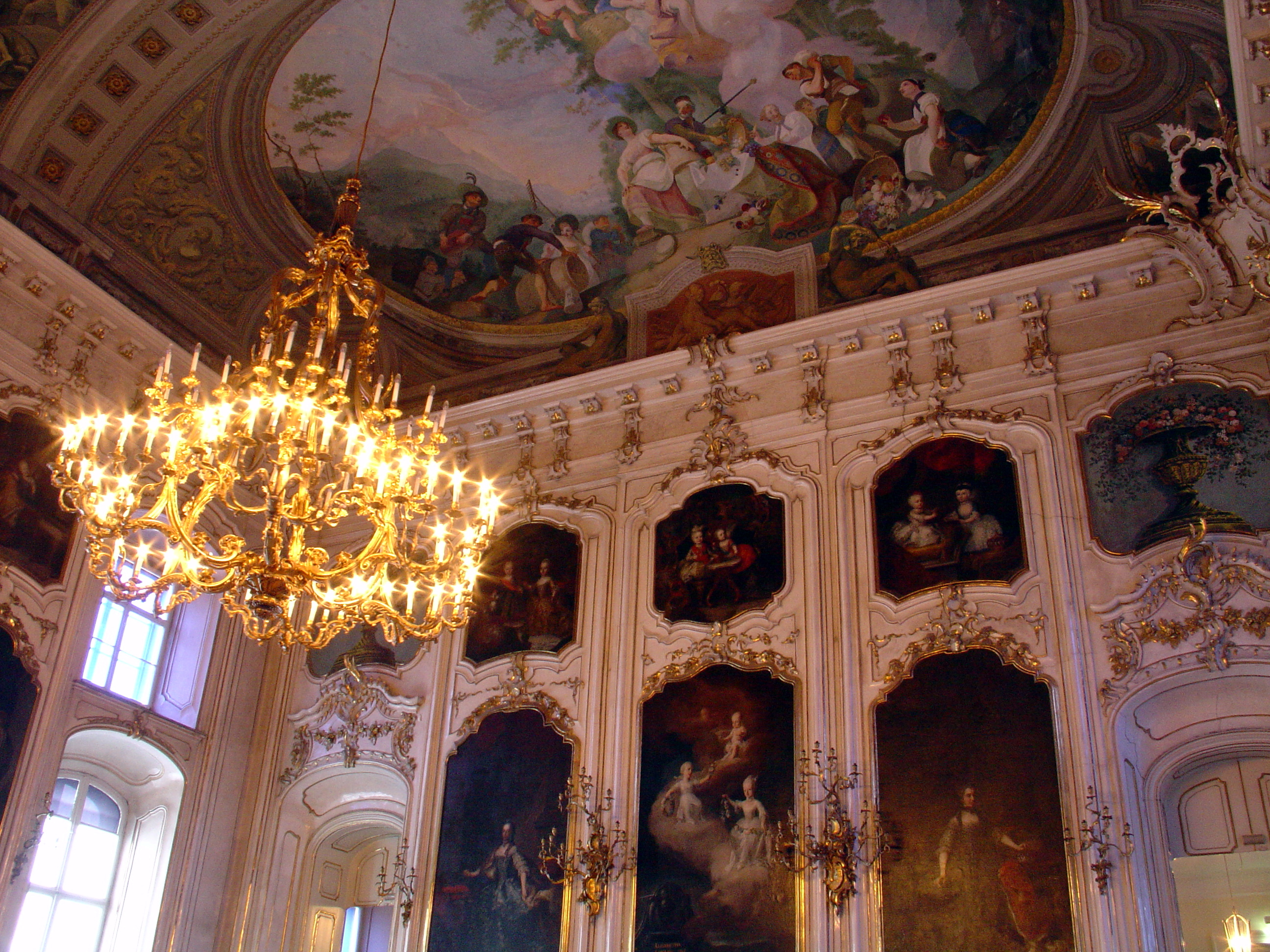
Giants' Hall frescoes by Franz Anton Maulbertsch, 1775–1776

- The Giants' Hall (Riesensaal) contains paintings of Maria Theresa's children and grandchildren. The name of the hall refers to the original frescoes of Hercules that decorated the room.
- The Audience Chamber serves as a monument to the ancestors of Emperor Francis I.
- The Council Chamber contains paintings depicting solemn celebrations of Catholic lay orders.
- The Residence was the home of the daughter of Maria Theresa, Maria Elisabeth (1743–1808), who became Abbess of the Noblewomen's Collegiate Foundation in 1781. Elisabeth was the only person to live in the imperial apartments for a significant period of time.
- The Empress Elisabeth Apartment contains original furnishings of silk fabrics and wall coverings.
- The Antechamber served as private quarters for the female members of the imperial house.
- The Salon of the Empress are the rooms in the private quarters decorated in Rococo style in different colors. The choice of colour depended on the function of the room according to a precise code.
- The Dressing Room is the beginning of the private quarters of the imperial apartments and served primarily for extensive personal grooming.
- The Study is the brightest room in the inner apartment, in the roundel of the North Tower. It served as a study for Empress Elisabeth.
- The Closet is a small room between the dressing room and the bedroom, and served as a wardrobe.
- The Bedroom was furnished as the "Bedroom of their Majesties".
- The Court Furniture Room includes chairs that were an expression of power and social hierarchy.
- The Chinese Room was named for the murals with Chinese motifs that decorate the room. Painted in 1773, these murals include depictions of Chinese men and women dancing and singing, a ceremonial procession with the emperor riding in a magnificent coach, and various hunting scenes. These wall paintings were discovered beneath wallpaper following bomb damage during World War II, and were restored between 1950 and 1951. The Biedermeier furniture by master carpenter Johann Nepomuk Geyer was made between 1838 and 1858.
- The Servants' Room contains "chairs of hard wood" supplied to the servants accompanying Emperor Ferdinand I to Innsbruck in 1838.
- The Court Table Setting is set for dessert in the style of a family dinner at court around 1840.
- The Servants' Corridor connected two State Rooms on outer sides of the Hofburg.
- The Portrait Gallery contains a series of portraits of prominent members of the Habsburg dynasty. Transferred to the Hofburg from Vienna, the collection contains portraits of all the Habsburg emperors from Joseph I (1705–1711) to Franz Joseph (1848–1916).
- The Furniture Gallery shows the different styles of each period, from the ornate empire style to the simpler and elegant Biedermeier style. The furniture pieces are traditional and unique craft products produced by the Thonet company.
- The Crafts Room illustrates the significant wealth of the Habsburgs.
- The Documentation Room shows the foundation of Giants' Hall.

== Gothic Hall ==
The Gothic Hall in the basement of the north wing was built in 1494 as a five-nave hall containing a cross-groined vault and medieval brickwork. This hall was once the entrance area connecting the northern gate with the drawbridge. The western part of the hall is still in its original Gothic condition. The southern part of the hall was most likely lowered during the Renaissance period. The eastern part of the hall was altered during the eighteenth century when dividing walls with a lower arch were installed between 1765 and 1779. The altered hall was once used as a kitchen. The total area of the Gothic Hall is 650 square metres (2133 square feet).

== Palace Courtyard ==
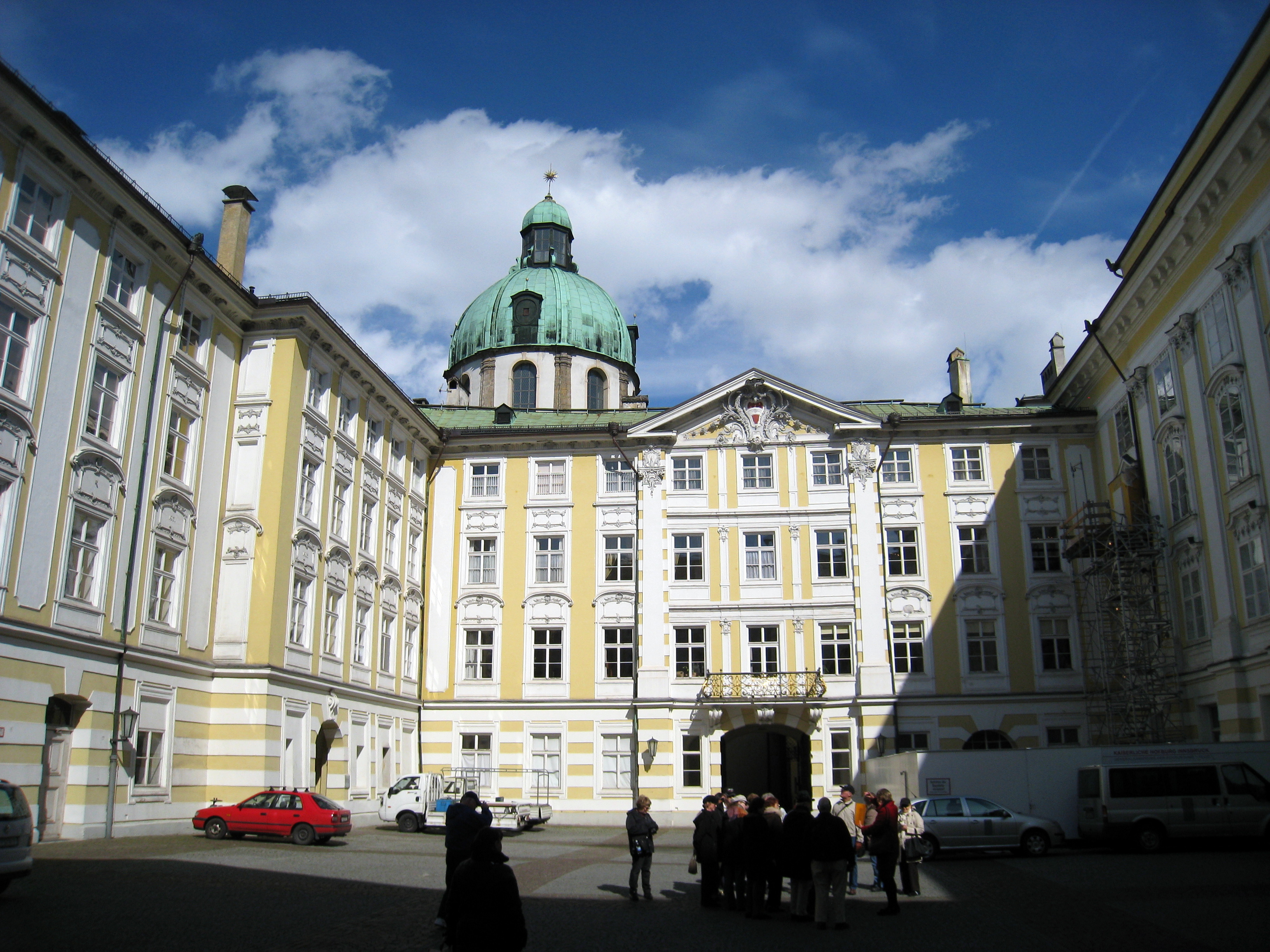
Palace courtyard

The large cobblestoned palace courtyard measuring 1300 square metres (4265 square feet) is enclosed by the Hofburg building and represents "the most beautiful inner courtyard in Innsbruck". Since the Baroque reconstruction, the courtyard has been decorated with sculptural elements such as pilaster, frames, cornices and the cartouches with the Austrian striped shield in the gables of the facades. The variations ensue from the varying old structures in the east, south, north and west. Four portals allow access into the courtyard.

== Sacred Rooms ==
The Hofburg currently houses two chapels that are available for Roman Catholic and ecumenical services, as well as cultural events.

- The Silberne Kapelle contains a Renaissance organ.
- The Hofburgkapelle is a spacious, light chapel on the second upper floor of the south wing.

== Gallery ==
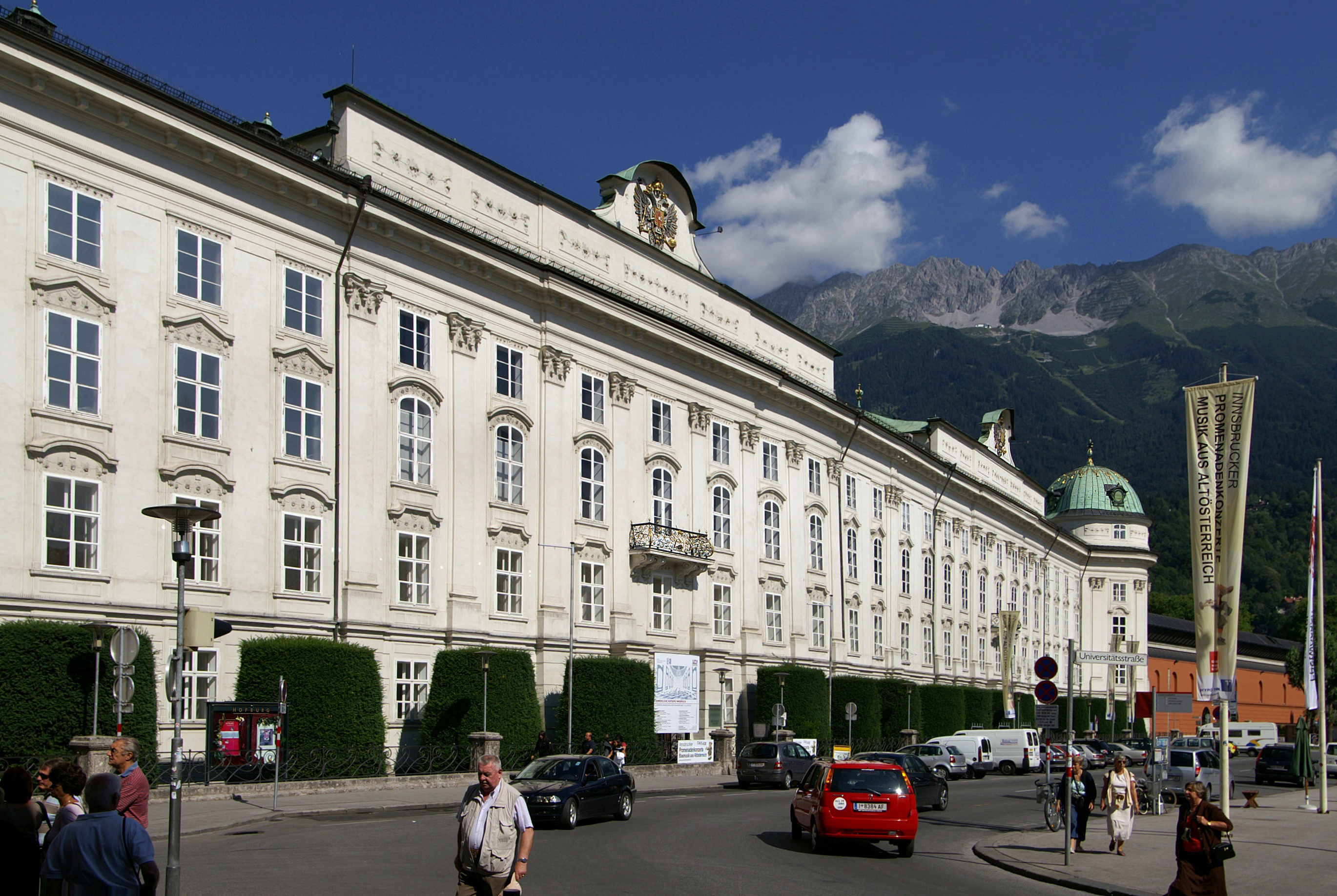
Hofburg on Rennweg

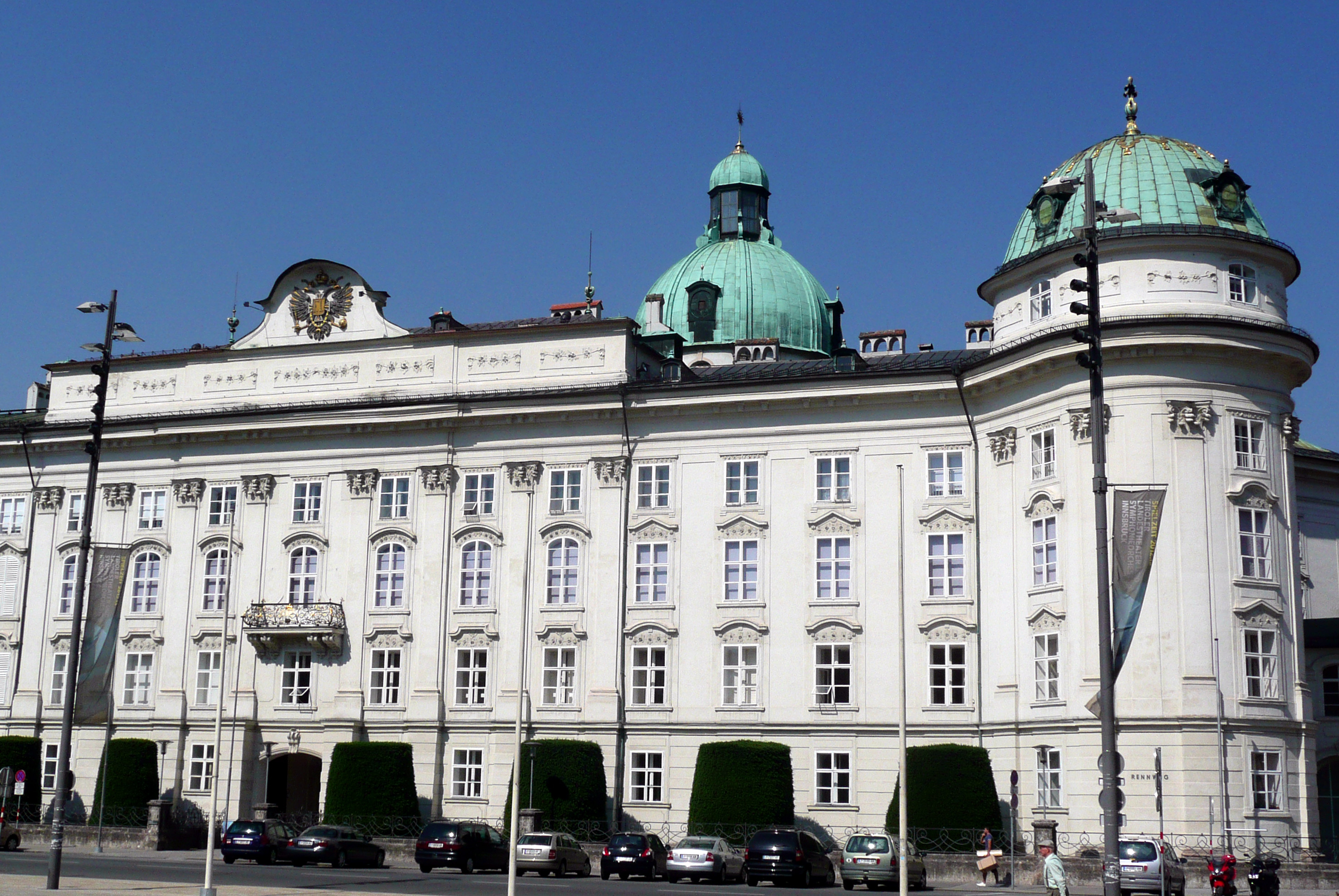
Hofburg main façade and the North Roundel

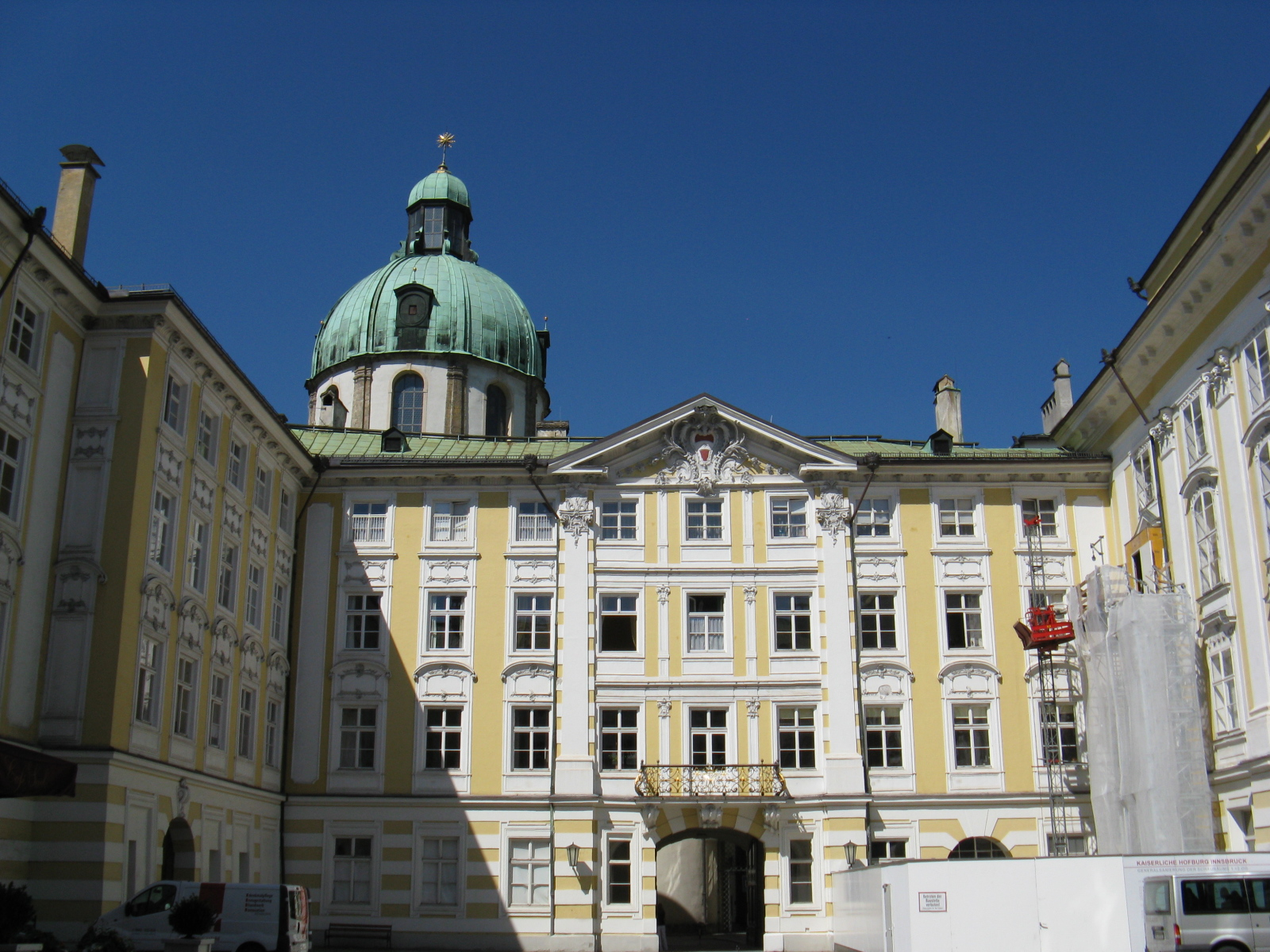
Palace courtyard

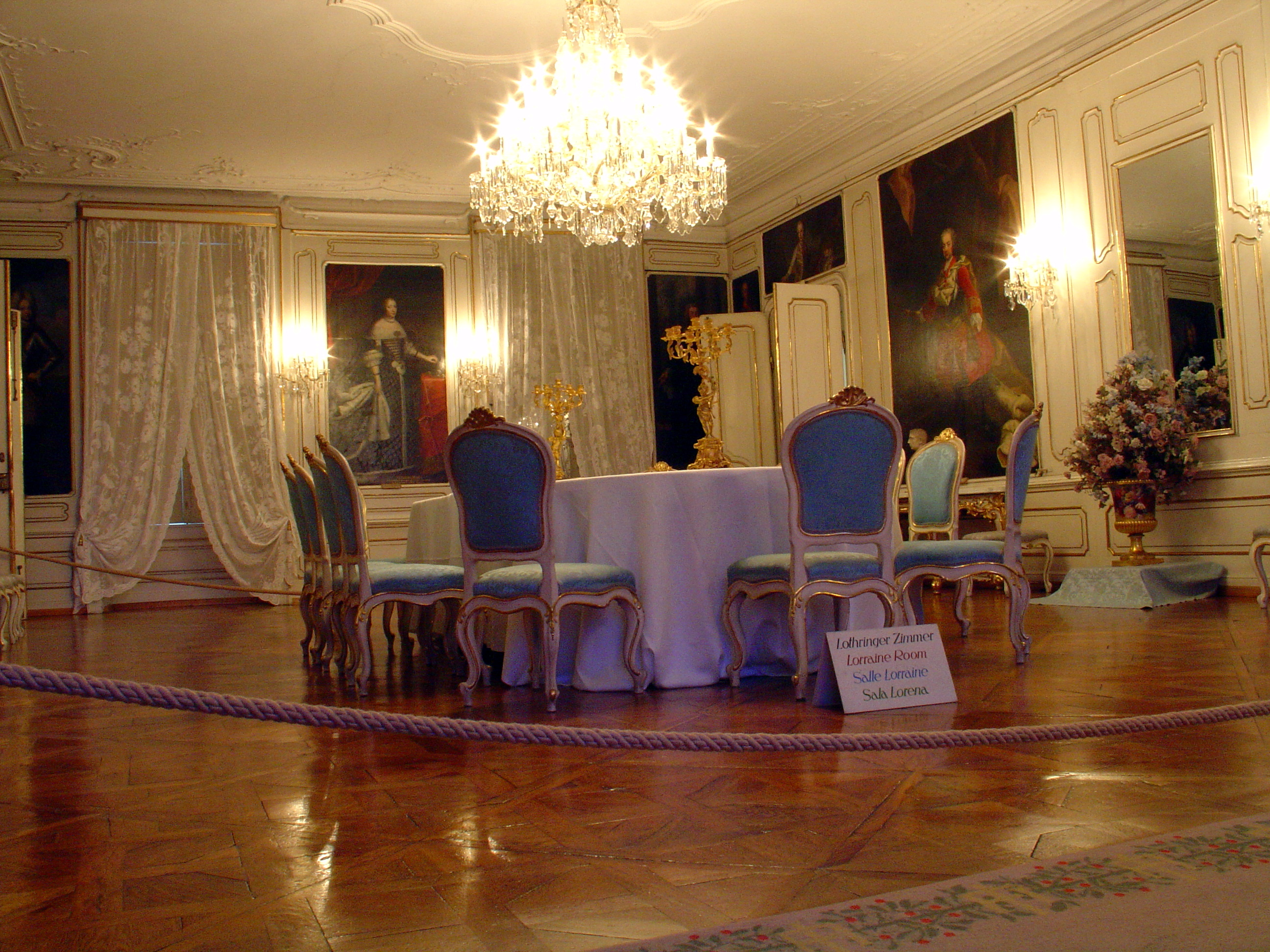
Lorraine Room

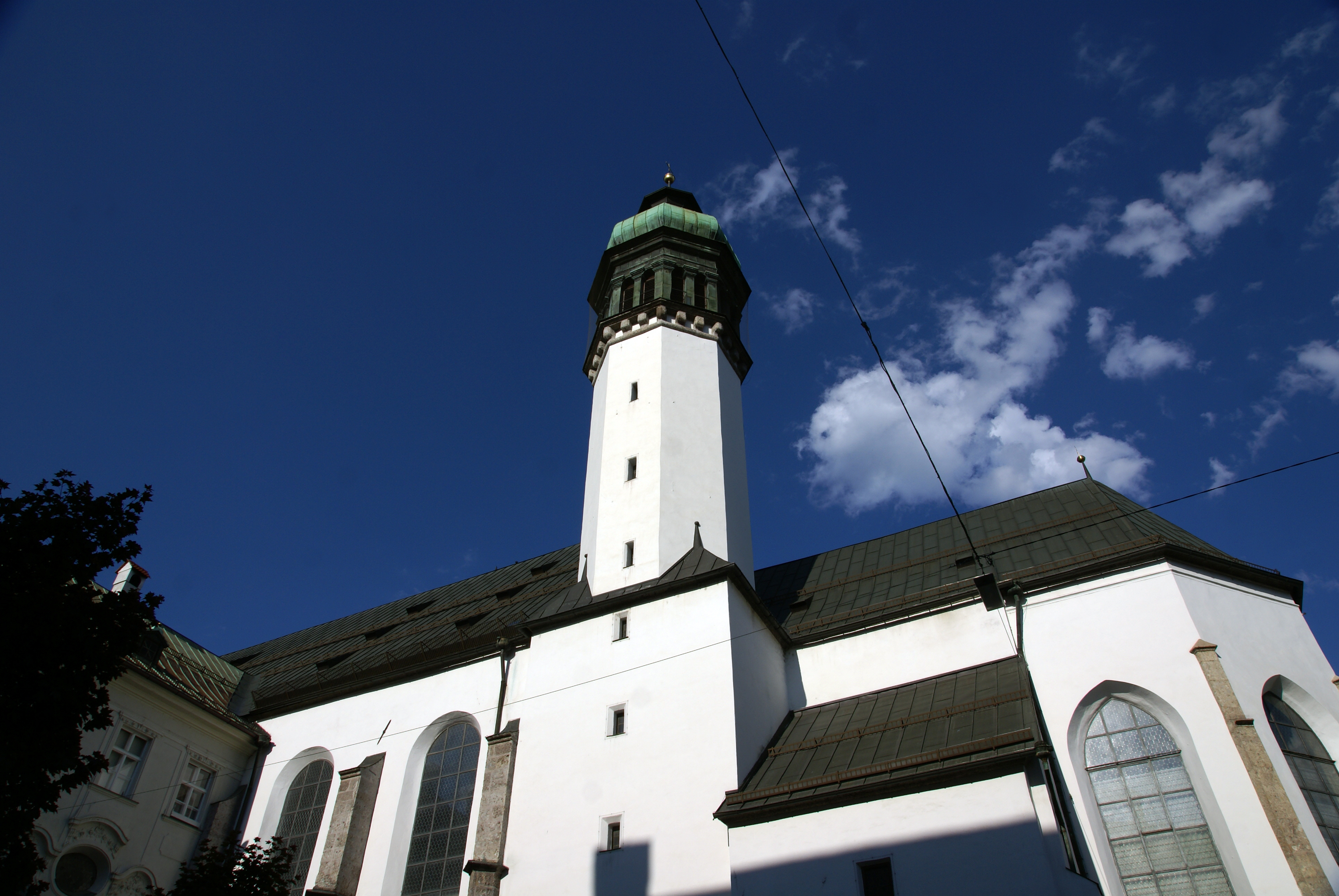
Hofkirche
