= Erke Duit =

German conductor and composer

Erke Duit (born 30 December 1957 in Bremen) is a German conductor, composer and director of several choirs and ensembles.

== Life ==
After his Abitur, Duit studied church music at the University of Music and Performing Arts Vienna, specialising in choral conducting (with Hans Gillesberger, Erwin Ortner), composition (with Erich Romanovsky), media composition (with Paul Kont), conducting (with Karl Österreicher) and at Biola College, Los Angeles (scholarship; organ with Charles Shaffer).

He is the father of a son and a daughter. Since 2005, he has been teaching Musical Interpretation and Role Designat the Music and Arts University of the City of Vienna.

== Works ==
- 1992 Cantata Hödlmoser, text: Reinhard P. Gruber For the steirischer herbst
- 1994 Setting of texts by H. C. Artmann for the NÖ. Donaufestival
- 1995 The Library of Babel, together with Fritz Rainer and Wolfgang Huber
- 1997 Celentano Arrangements, for La Cappella Vienna, performed at the Kabarett Simpl
- 1998 The Bremen Town Musicians, chamber orchestra work
- 1999 Orchestral work KINDER, for Karl Friedrich Flic
- 2000 Cantata adam.eva.aus with the Chorvereinigung Gegenstimmen
- 2001 Waldviertler Suite for 34 wind instruments (performed with the GRENZBLÄSERN)
- 2002 Hohes Haus Musik, setting to music of the black-blue government declaration, premiere in the Austrian Parliament with the Chorvereinigung Gegenstimmen choir
- 2003 Brandner Kaspar, a theatre music for vocal quartet (performed by the SCHLEICHQUARTETT)
- 2005 Gib mir die Kugel, a full-length globalisation cantata with the Gegenstimmen Choir

== Activities ==
320 rock concerts as singer/pianist with the group "Robin" (tour West US), since 1981 freelance composer and musician. Musical director or composer/pianist: 1981-1988 Volkstheater, Vienna, Theater in der Josefstadt, Theater d. Jugend (Vienna), Kammerspiele, Theater Akzent, dietheater Künstlerhaus, Salzburger Landestheater as well as in various other theatres in Germany and Austria, choirmaster of the "Chorvereinigung Gegenstimmen" since 1992, conductor of the sirene Operntheater in 2001, musical director at the Schlossspiele Kobersdorf in 2006. (Brecht/Weill/Threepenny Opera) and the Waldviertler Hoftheater in Pürbach near Schrems.

=== Orchestra ===
- 1985–1995 Director of the Ensemble Neue Streicher (well over 100 concerts with numerous world premieres).
- 1995-2002 director of the Capella Nova Klosterneuburg (chamber orchestra)
- Director of the Camerata Wien since 1990
- Musical director of the Volkskunstorchester
- Musical director of the Waldviertler Hoforchester (border wind orchestra)

Numerous recordings on CD, MC, LP for ORF (Radio + TV)

=== Choirs ===
- Lecturer for advanced pop ensemble at the VEREINTEN STIMMEN for the summer semester 2005.
- Since 1994 Duit has directed the Viennese political choir Chorvereinigung Gegenstimmen.
