= Youri Vámos =

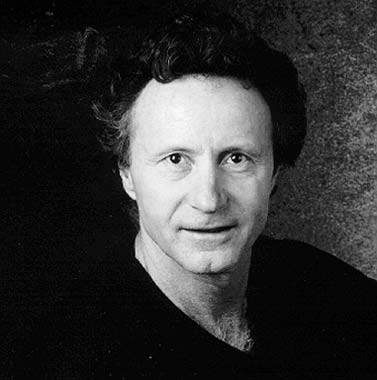
Youri Vámos

Youri Vámos was born in Budapest. He trained in ballet from a young age at the State Ballet School in Budapest. He was a soloist at the Hungarian State Opera and then later accepted a contract as a first soloist at the Bavarian State Opera.

== Career ==
After his career as a dancer Vámos began to focus on choreography and teaching. He served as ballet director in Dortmund, Bonn, and Basel. His choreography focuses on full length ballets that he revises for modern audiences. For such he has been called “the last ballet narrator” by Petr Zuska, the Artistic Director of the National Theatre Ballet in Prague. He has used traditional stories like Sleeping Beauty and the Nutcracker as the basis for modern ballets. For example, his production of the Nutcracker uses the Tchaikovsky score, but changes the story to tell of Charles Dickens' tale of Scrooge, combining the two beloved Christmas stories into one ballet. In each ballet Vámos is intrigued by the original music and its ability to convey character and emotional nuance to the audience. His choreography mirrors these characteristics through its idiosyncratic movements that give each dancer a particular role.

Vámos created many of these ballets during his thirteen years at the Deutsche Oper am Rhein, where his performances were often applauded for the new life they brought to older stories. His critical acclaim continued; in 2007 he received the Order of Merit of the German state of North Rhine-Westphalia. Since 2009 Vámos has worked as a freelance choreographer, working with companies around the world such as the Badisches Staatstheater Karlsruhe and the National Theatre in Prague.
