= Goldenes Dachl =

Landmark building in Innsbruck, Austria

Coordinates: 47.268583°N 11.393264°E

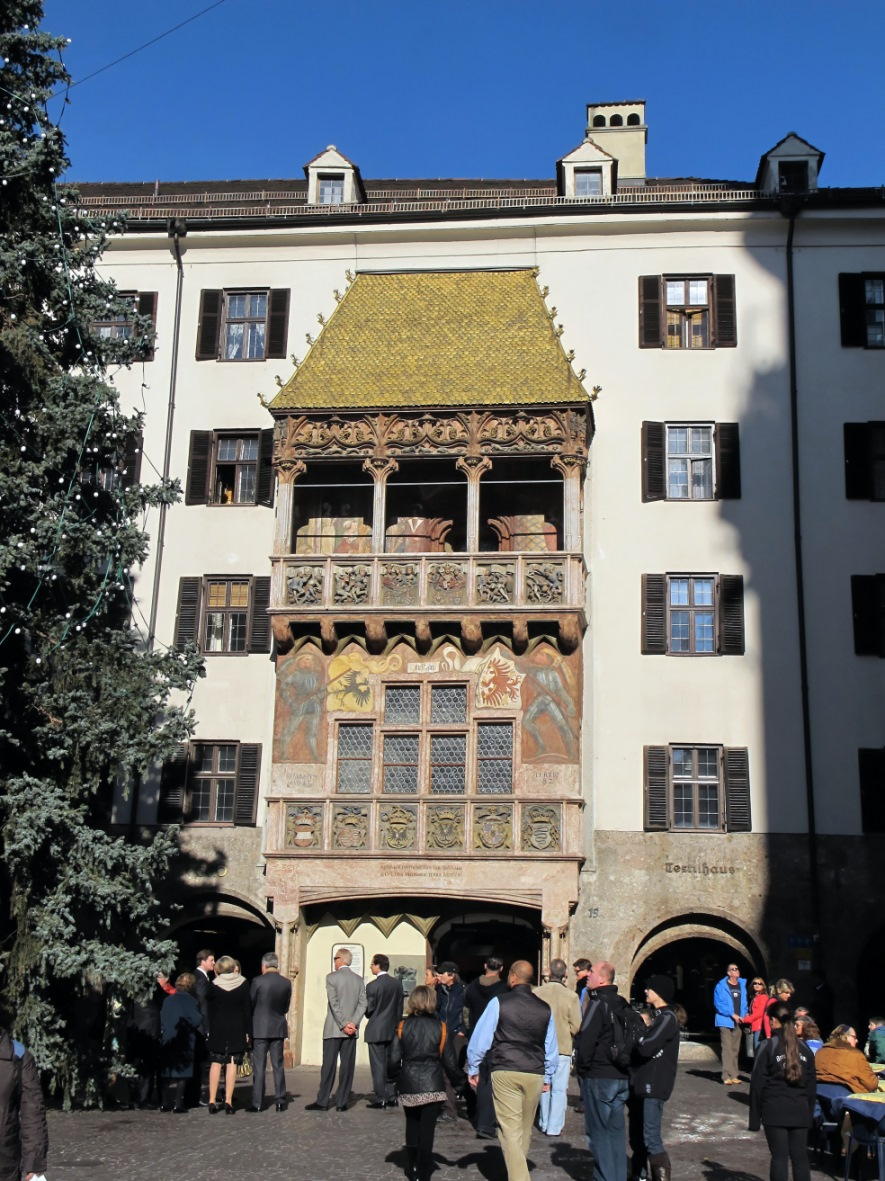
Goldenes Dachl (Golden Roof) in Innsbruck, Austria

The Goldenes Dachl (Golden Roof) is a landmark structure located in the Old Town (Altstadt) section of Innsbruck, Austria. It is considered the city's most famous symbol. Completed in 1500, the roof was decorated with 2,657 fire-gilded copper tiles for Emperor Maximilian I to mark his wedding to Bianca Maria Sforza. The Emperor and his wife used the balcony to observe festivals, tournaments, and other events that took place in the square below.

== Description ==
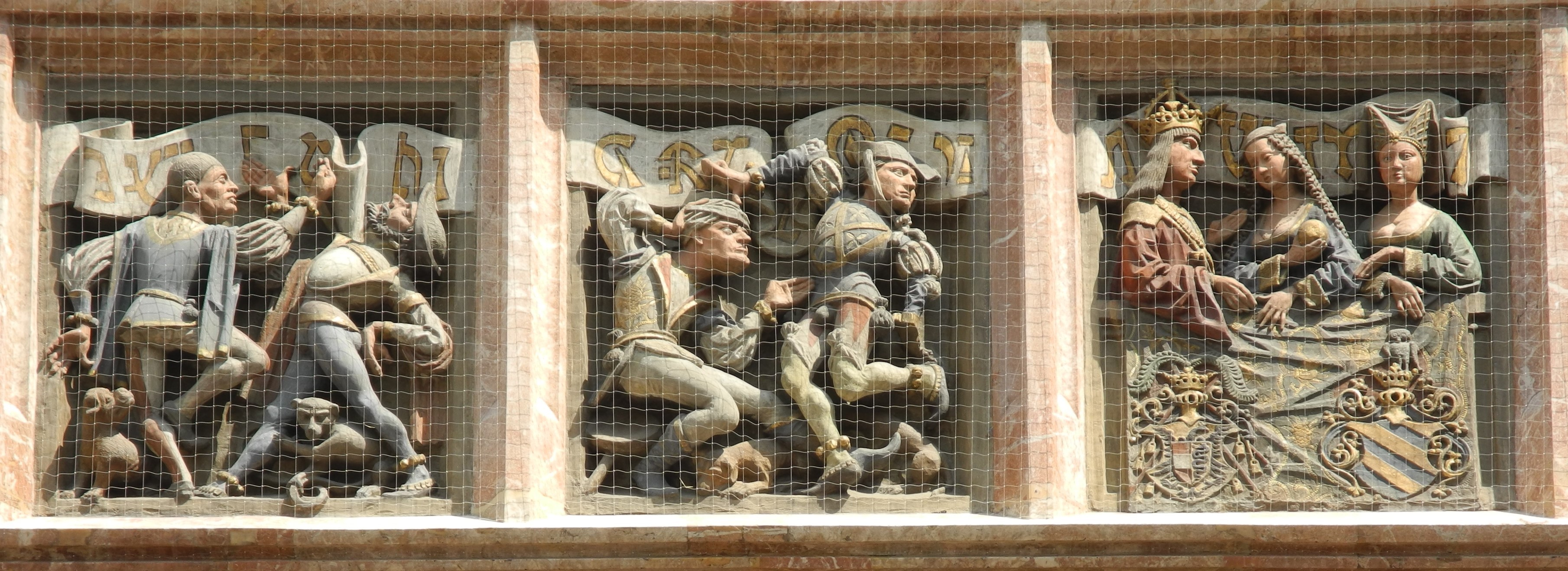
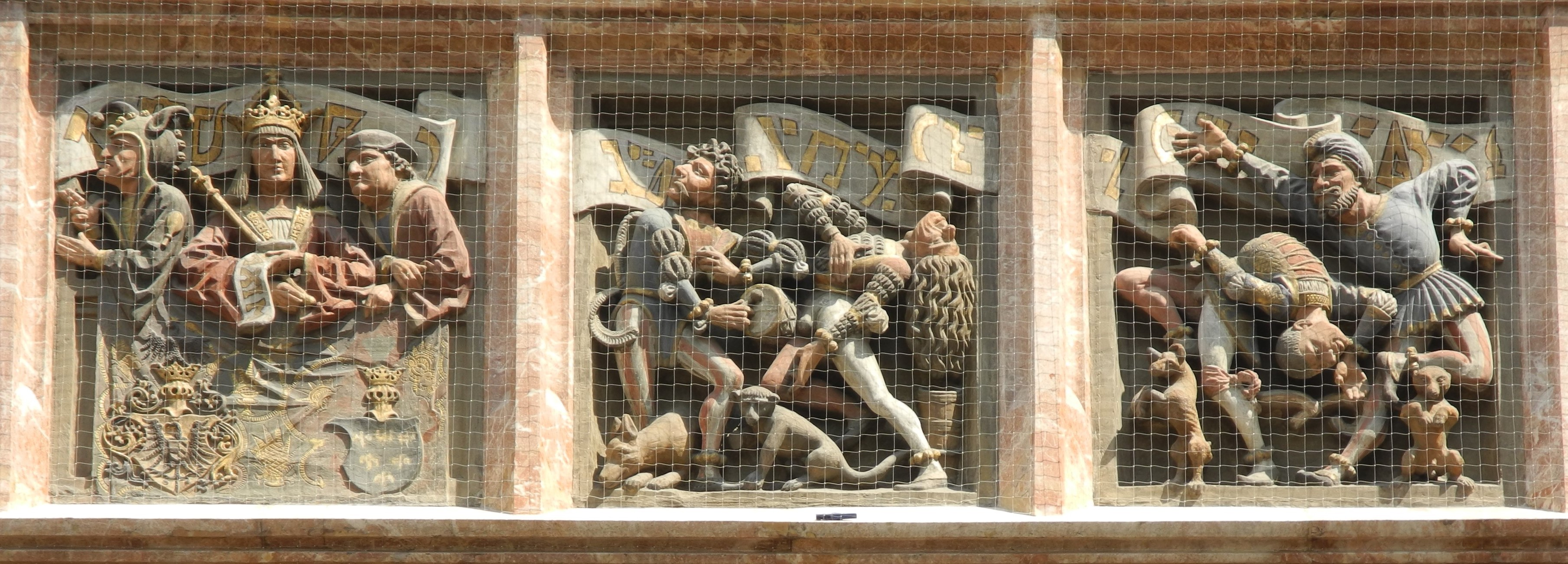
The strange characters on the banderole running behind the figures across all frames are a coded message. Recently, historian and Germanist Erhard Maroschek interpreted the text as: “EGO SUM LUX MUNDI QUI SEQUITUR ME NON AMBULABIT IN TENEBRIS SED HABEBIT LUCEM VITÆ DICIT DOMINUS” (“I am the light of the world. He who follows me will not walk in darkness, but he will have the light of life, says the Lord".) This is a quote from Gospel of John chapter 8, verse 12).

The entire oriel is decorated in sculpted reliefs and mural paintings. The first-floor balustrade is adorned with eight sculpted coats of arms, six facing the square and two flanking panels, representing Maximilian's territories. Above the coats of arms are frescoes by Jörg Kölderer, painted in 1500, showing two knights bearing heraldic flags representing the Holy Roman Empire and Tyrol.

The second-floor balustrade is decorated in eight sculpted reliefs, six facing the square and two flanking panels, depicting various images associated with Maximilian's life. The two central reliefs show Maximilian. The one on the left shows the Emperor with his second wife Bianca Maria Sforza on the left holding an apple, and his beloved first wife Maria of Burgundy on the right. The other central relief shows the Emperor with his court jester and his chancellor. The flanking reliefs show Moorish dancers engaged in "acrobatic and grotesque dancing"—a common form of popular entertainment of that time. The dancing shown in these outer reliefs is of Andalusian origin.

The frescoes that adorn the interior of the loggia were also painted by Jörg Kölderer and show scenes from the aristocratic life of that time. All of the decorations on the current structure are carefully executed replicas. The original reliefs are on permanent display in the Tyrolean State Museum, known as the Ferdinandeum.

== History ==
The building that bears the Goldenes Dachl was constructed by Archduke Friedrich IV in the early fifteenth century as the residence of the Tyrolean sovereigns. Emperor Maximilian I commissioned the loggia in 1493 from Nikolaus Turing the Elder, the Innsbruck court builder, at the time of his marriage to Bianca Maria Sforza. It was Turing who designed and built the "golden" roof with its 2,657 fire-gilded copper tiles.

The Goldenes Dachl was designed to serve as a royal box where the Emperor and his imperial entourage could sit in state and enjoy festivals, tournaments, and other events that took place in the square below. The Goldenes Dachl was built in honor of Maximilian's marriage to Bianca Maria Sforza of Milan. Not wishing to alienate the allies gained by his first marriage, to Maria of Burgundy, he had an image of himself between the two women painted on his balcony.

Since January 2003, the Goldenes Dachl has housed the International Alpine Convention's Office. The Alpine Convention is a coalition of eight Alpine Countries united by a shared commitment to sustainable development in the European Alps. A museum, the Maximilianum, is also contained in the building as well as the Innsbruck City Archives.

== Gallery ==
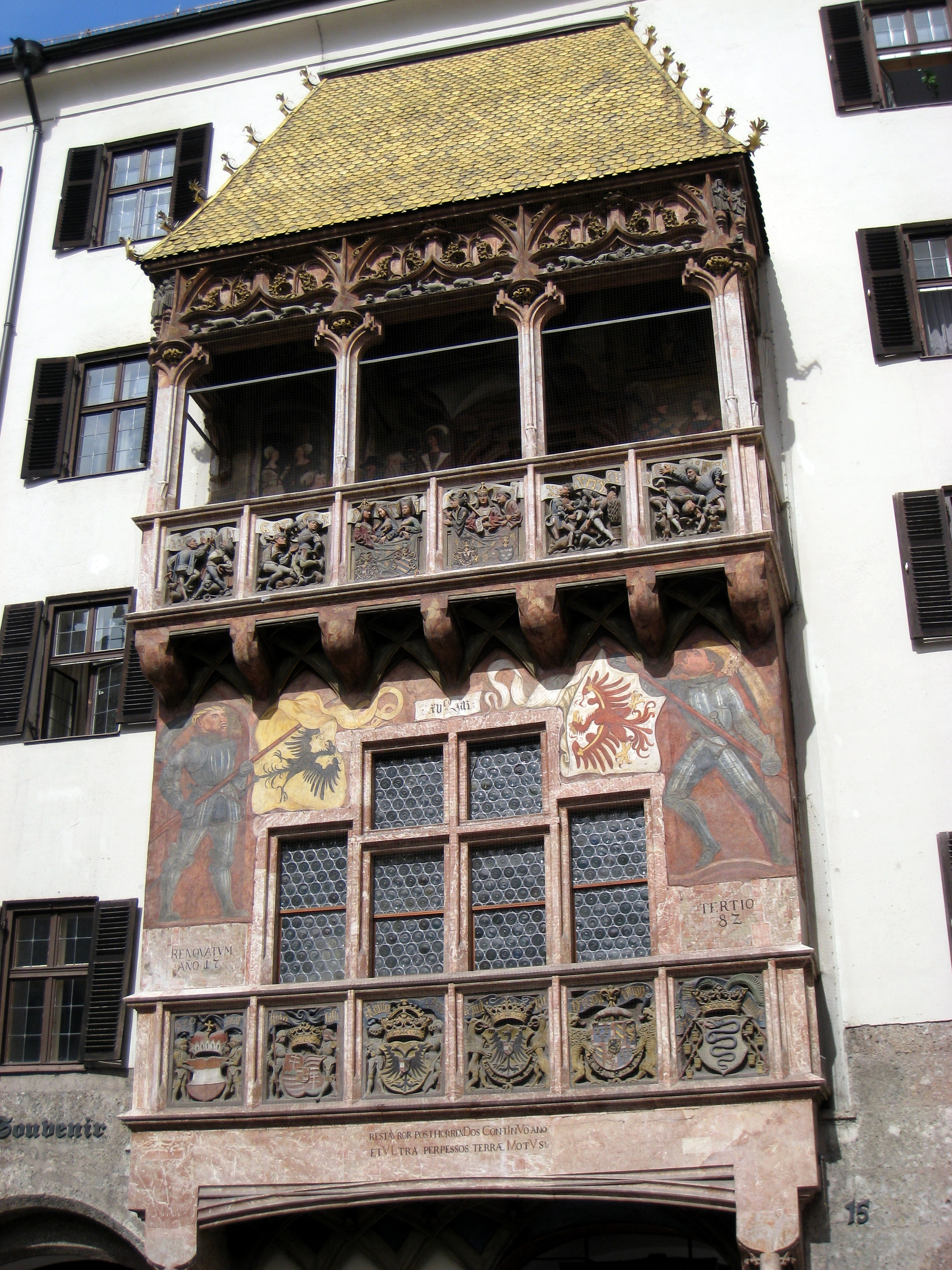
Goldenes Dachl

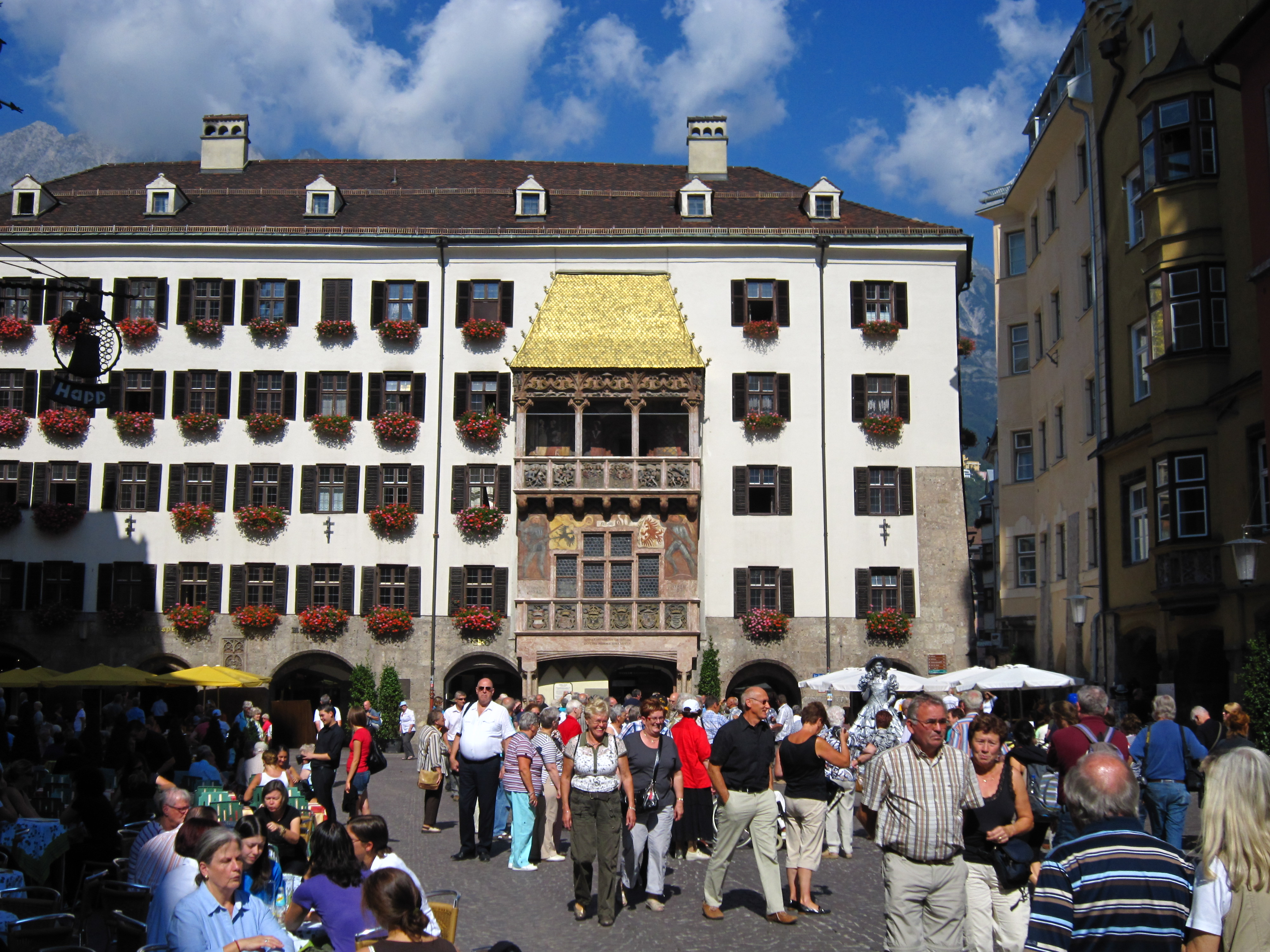
Goldenes Dachl in the Old Town (Altstadt)

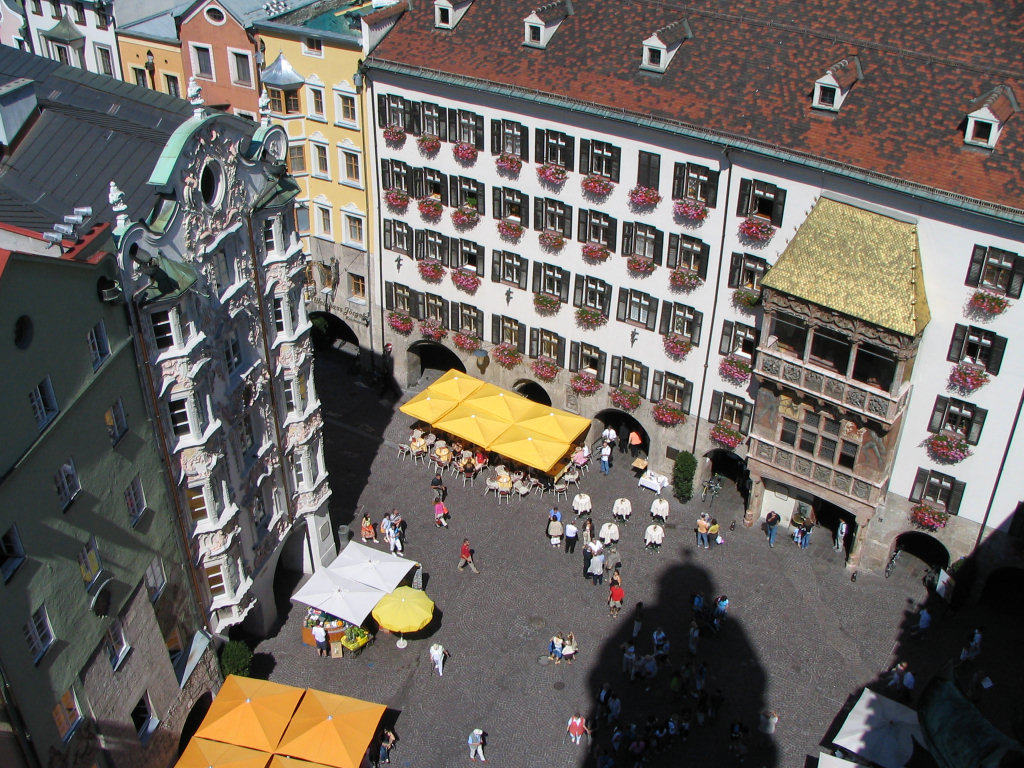
Goldenes Dachl from the Stadtturm

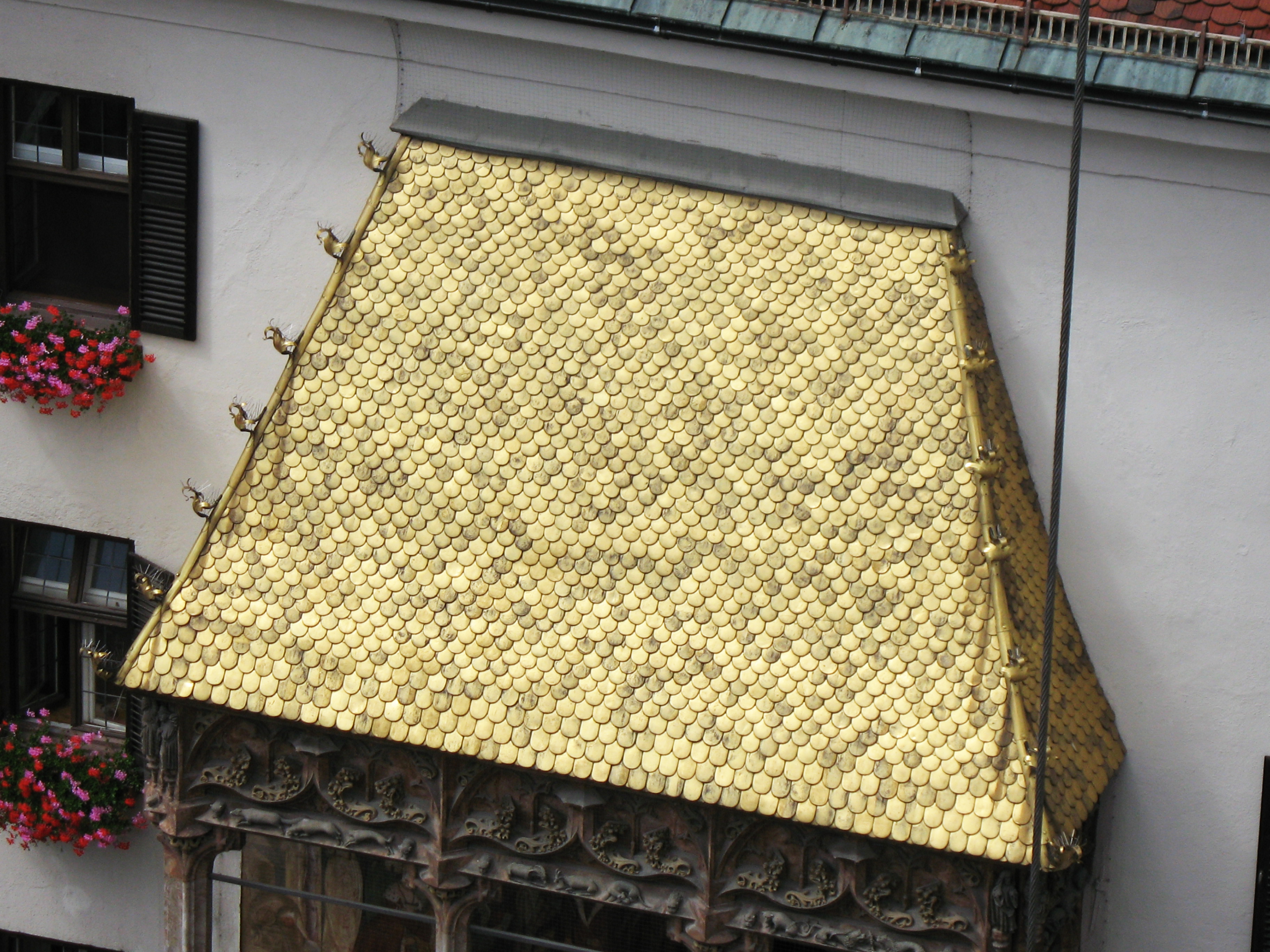
Goldenes Dachl
