= Tyrolean State Theatre =

Coordinates: 47°16′10″N 11°23′47″E

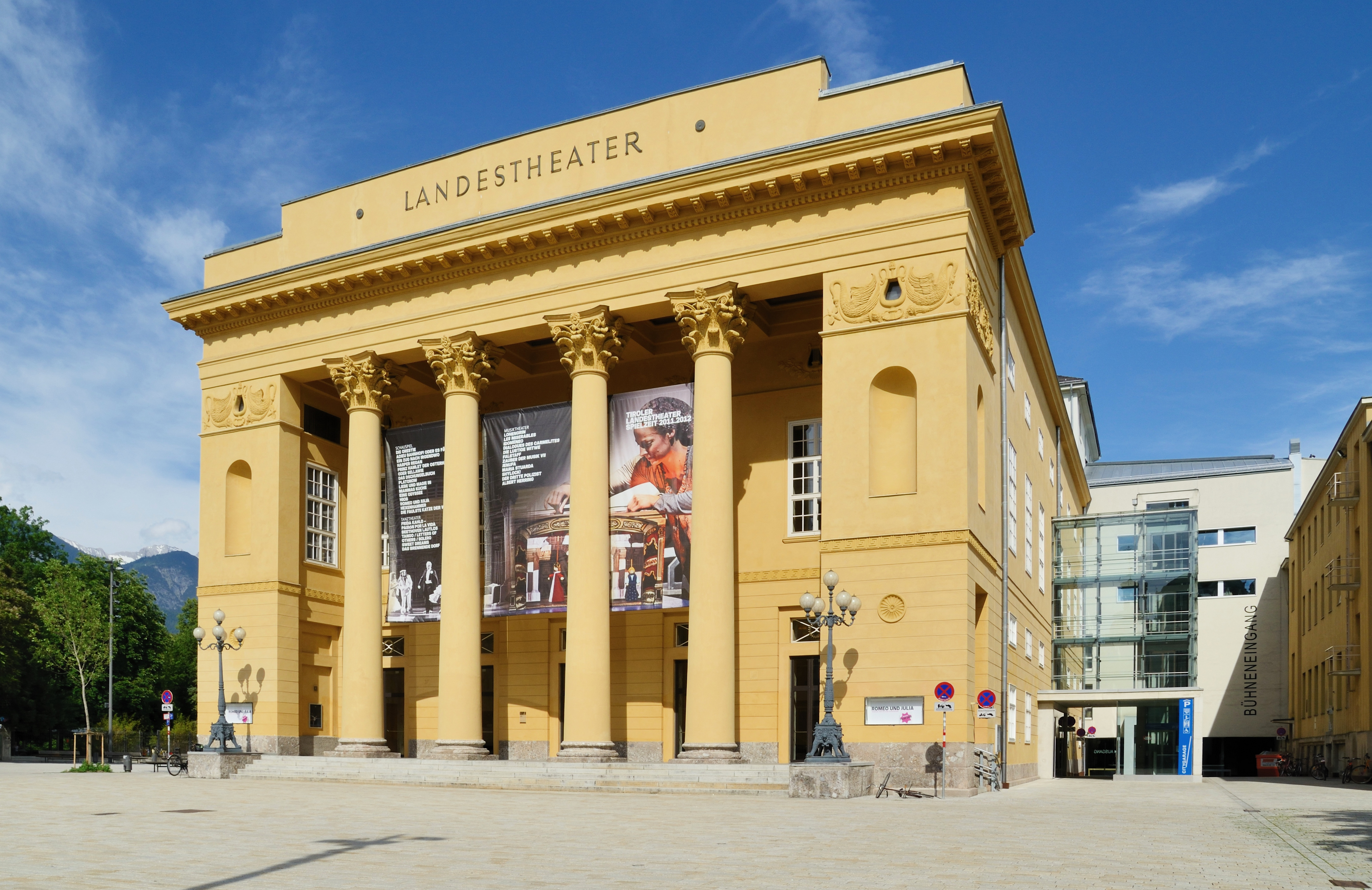
Tiroler Landestheater Innsbruck

The Tyrolean State Theatre in Innsbruck (German: Tiroler Landestheater Innsbruck) is the state theatre in Innsbruck, Austria, located near the historic Altstadt (Old Town) section of the city. The theatre is surrounded by the Imperial Hofburg, the Hofgarten, and SOWI Faculty of the University of Innsbruck. The main theatre has about 800 seats and the studio theatre in the basement has around 250. Plays, operas, operettas, musicals and dance theatre are performed at the theatre.

== History ==
In 1629, architect Christopher Gump the Younger converted one of the houses along a raceway from the Imperial Hofburg into a Comedihaus, the great theatre of the Archduke Leopold. In 1654, a new theatre was built by Christopher Gump which opened on the other side of the raceway where the Landestheater stands today. This court theatre was renovated in 1765. Following the Bavarian occupation in 1805, the theatre was called the Royal Bavarian Court National Theatre. In 1844, the theatre was closed due to disrepair.

In the 1840s, a theatre company was constituted and donations were raised. The existing theatre building was opened in 1846. In 1945, the city theatre was renamed the Tiroler Landestheater (Tyrolean State Theatre). In 1959, the studio theatre in the basement was opened. The Tyrolean Provincial Theatre or main theatre was closed in 1961 and rebuilt in the following years and significantly expanded. In 1967, the main theatre was reopened. In 1991 and 1992, the theatre was renovated and converted into a flexible space theatre.

In 2003, the new rehearsal stage was designed by the architect Karl Probst of Munich and completed as an extension to the main theatre. The Landestheater, with its three venues, meets the requirements of a modern stage operation and ensures that ambitious stage productions will take place in Innsbruck. As a final construction, the façade of the Landestheater was renovated and a new forecourt was added.

== Premieres ==
- 1895 Um Haus und Hof by Franz Kranewitter
- 1986 Kein schöner Land by Felix Mitterer
- 1992 Präsident Abendwind by Elfriede Jelinek
- 1996 Baumeister Solness by Anton Ruppert
- 1996 Terror by Egon A. Prantl
- 1996 Gustav Ernst by Elfriede Jelinek
- 1996 Jubiläum, Jubiläum by Thomas Hürlimann and Heinz. D. Heisl
- 1997 Heisse Hunde.Hot Dogs by Kurt Lanthaler
- 1999 Tödliche Sünden by Felix Mitterer
- 2002 Häftling von Mab by Eduard Demetz
- 2003 Menschen Mörder by Matthias Kessler
- 2003 Caravaggio (Malerportrait für Tanztheater) by Jochen Ulrich
- 2004 7 Operellen by Akos Banlaky, Christof Dienz, Jury Everhartz, Gilbert Handler, Peter Planyavsky, Kurt Schwertsik, and Wolfram Wagner
- 2005 Schluss mit André by René Freund
- 2005 Dreamboy gesucht by Lode Devos
- 2006 Under Milk Wood by Akos Banlaky
- 2010 Lulu, das Musical
