= Trolleybuses in Innsbruck =

Electric public transport system in Innsbruck, Austria

Innsbruck trolleybus system
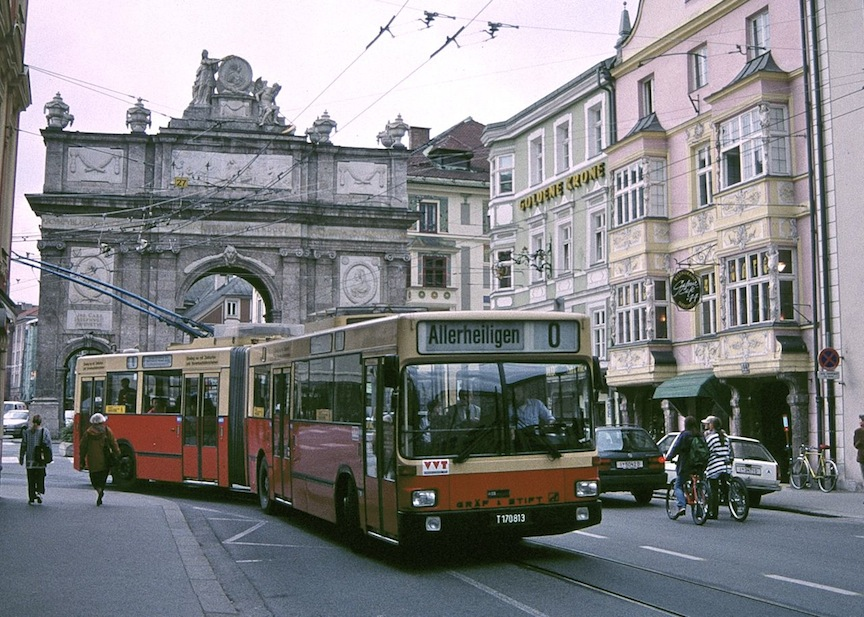
- A trolleybus of the second system passing the Triumphpforte in 1995

Operation
- Locale: Innsbruck, Tyrol, Austria

Statistics
First era: 1944–1976
- Routes: 3
- Operator: Innsbrucker Verkehrsbetriebe
- Electrification: 600 V DC
Second era: 1988–2007
- Routes: 2
- Operator: IVB
- Electrification: 600 V DC
- Route length: 18.9 km (12 mi)
Third era
- Status: Planned; opening forecast for 2029

The Innsbruck trolleybus system (German: Oberleitungsbus Innsbruck) has been part of the public transport network of the city of Innsbruck, Austria, during two past periods, 1944–1976 and 1988–2007, and the reinstatement of trolleybus service is planned for implementation in 2029. The first trolleybus system opened in April 1944, and within four months it had grown to three routes (A, B, and C). The trolleybus system closed on 29 February 1976, but less than a decade later, local officials began to consider returning trolleybus service to Innsbruck, and construction began in 1986.

The second system opened 17 December 1988, with two routes (O and R). In late 1992, the Innsbruck system became one of the first trolleybus systems in the world to introduce low-floor vehicles. Route extensions were constructed and opened in 1992, 1995, and 2001. Nevertheless, in 2000 discussion began on proposals to close the trolleybus system as part of plans to expand the city's tramway network. Agreement to do so was reached in 2001. Route R was closed (converted to diesel buses) in February 2005, and the last remaining route, O, closed in February 2007.

In 2021, city officials announced an intention to convert all public transport in the city to electric vehicles, and as part of this goal, consideration would be given to bringing back trolleybuses again. The plans gradually advanced, and in 2026 it was confirmed that trolleybus operation would return to Innsbruck, on two routes, C and R. An order was placed for 20 new trolleybuses, and the target date for opening of the new, third trolleybus system is 2029.

== First system ==
=== History ===
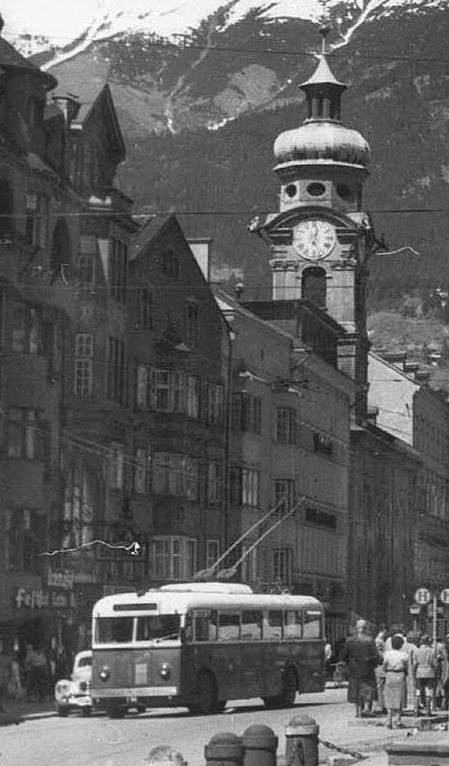
A Gräf & Stift trolleybus on Maria Theresien Strasse circa 1960

As motorbus service was severely restricted by a shortage of fuel during the Second World War, it was decided in 1940 to construct a trolleybus system in Innsbruck, with three routes, to be operated by the Innsbrucker Verkehrsbetriebe (IVB), the operator of the city's tramway network. Brown Boveri began installation of the overhead wires in January 1942. An order was placed with Henschel for 18 trolleybuses, but was cancelled by German authorities, who wanted that company to concentrate on production of military vehicles. IVB was told that replacement vehicles would be requisitioned from elsewhere. Innsbruck's first trolleybuses were five Breda vehicles built in 1936 for the Rome trolleybus system, which arrived in 1943. Four more trolleybuses requisitioned by the German government from systems in the Italian Social Republic, built in 1935/36 by Fiat for the Livorno system, arrived in December 1943, followed in 1944 by four 1939 Fiats from the San Remo system. Airstrikes delayed the introduction of trolleybus service.

The first trolleybus route, C, opened on 8 April 1944, connecting Arzl with Wiltenberg. The trolleybus depot took a direct hit in an air raid on 13 June 1944, and two trolleybuses received minor damage. The opening of route A followed on 26 June, between Hötting, in the hills north of the city centre, and a temporary city centre terminus on Innrain initially. It was extended from Innrain to Hauptbahnhof (the main railway station) on 2 December 1944. Route B, the third and last route, opened on 9 August 1944, running from Bozner Platz in the city centre to Pradl. Air raids repeatedly damaged the overhead wires, forcing service to be suspended at times. In the first years after the war, operation was made more difficult by a shortage of tyres and electricity. The routes were changed several times over the subsequent years, especially in the city centre. From 2 December 1949, route A was reconfigured in the city centre to follow a loop routing between Hauptbahnhof and Bozner Platz, running eastbound via Salurner Strasse and westbound via Brixner Strasse.

Route designation	Termini and routing	Dates of operation
A	Hauptbahnhof – Marktgraben – Hötting	26 June 1944 – 29 February 1976
B	Pradl – Bozner Platz – Hauptbahnhof	9 August 1944 – 30 June 1969
C	Arzl – City Centre – Wiltenberg	8 April 1944 – 17 April 1971

Maps showing the layout of the overhead wires in the city centre at different times appear below. Red indicates trolleybus wiring while black indicates tram track and wires.

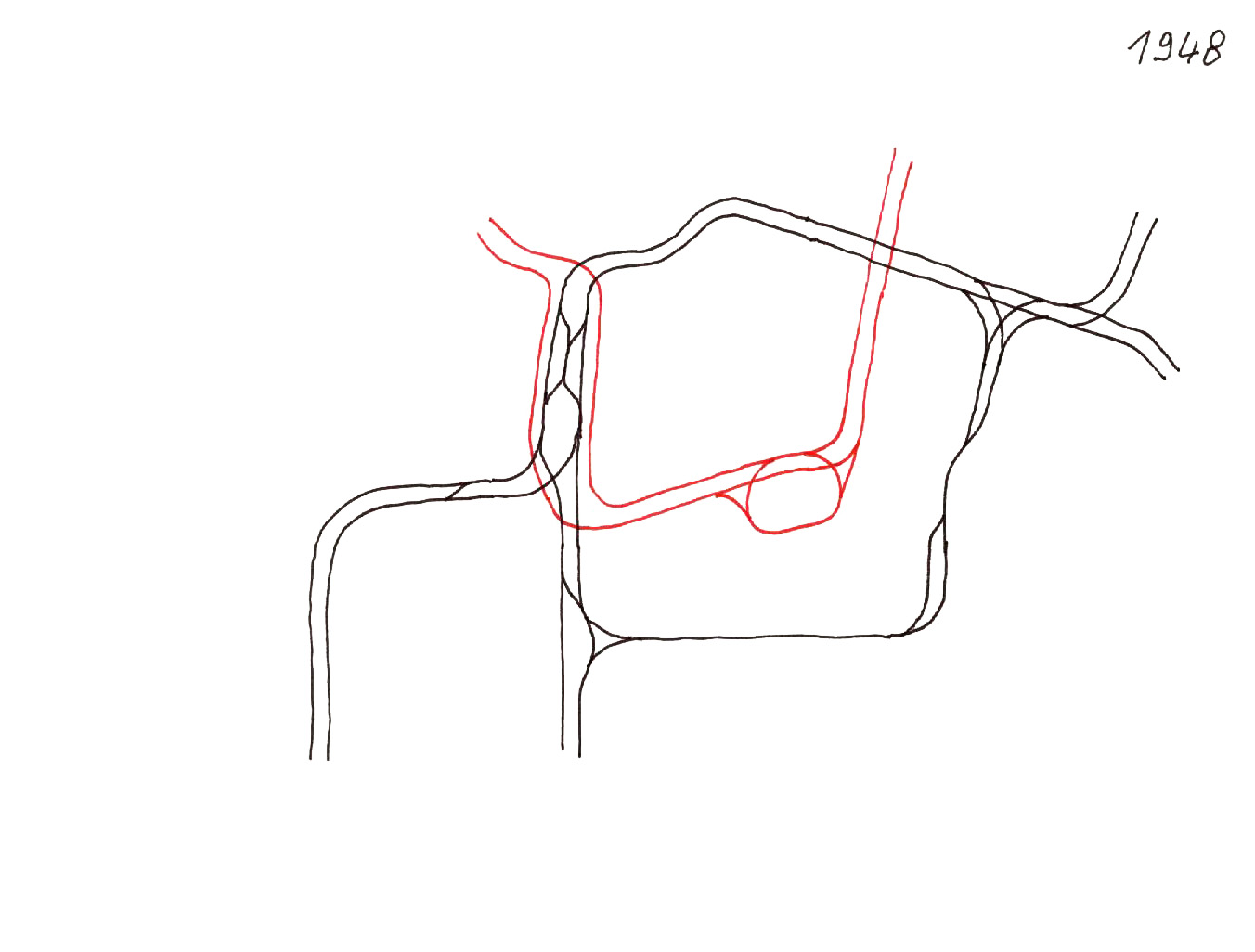
1948

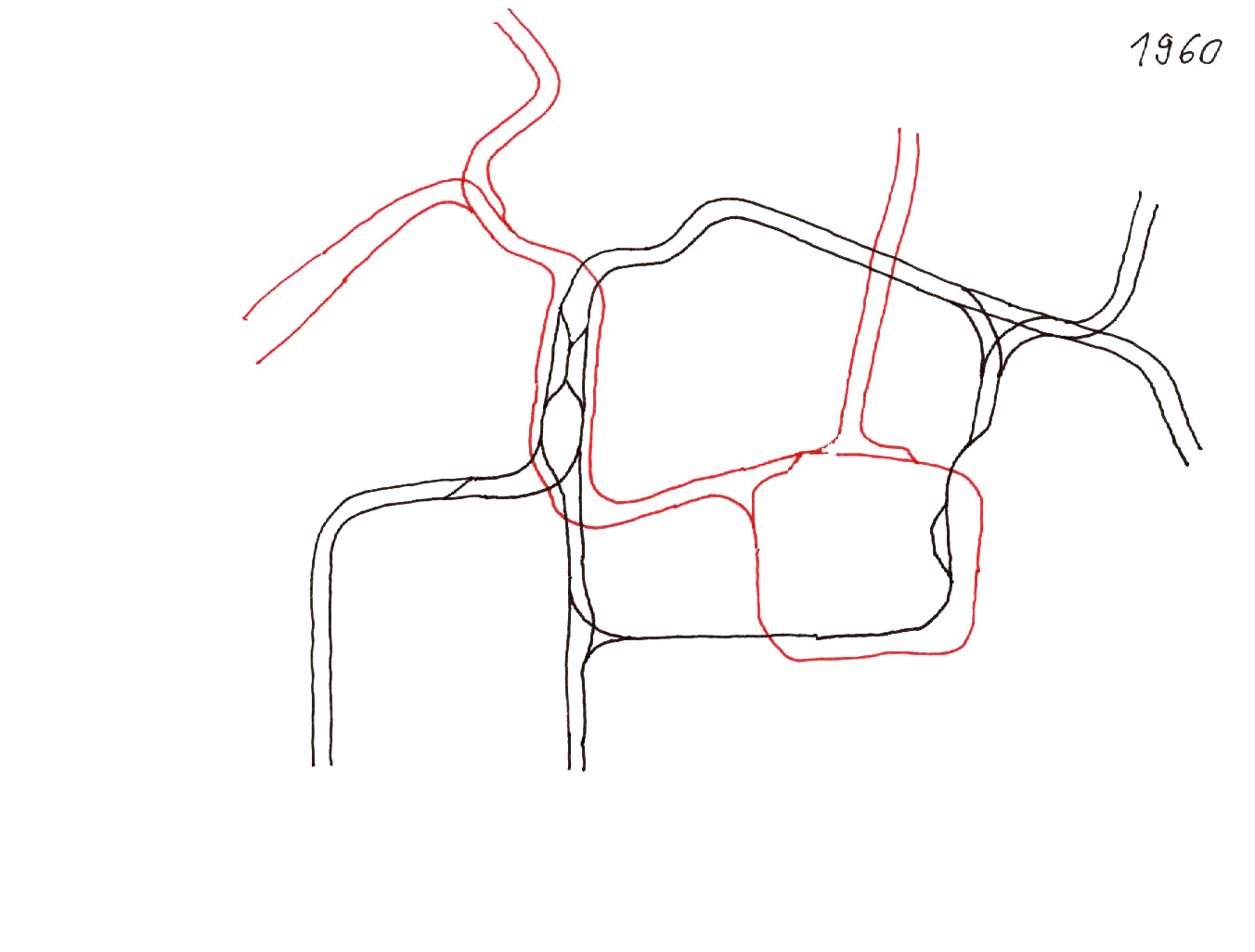
1960

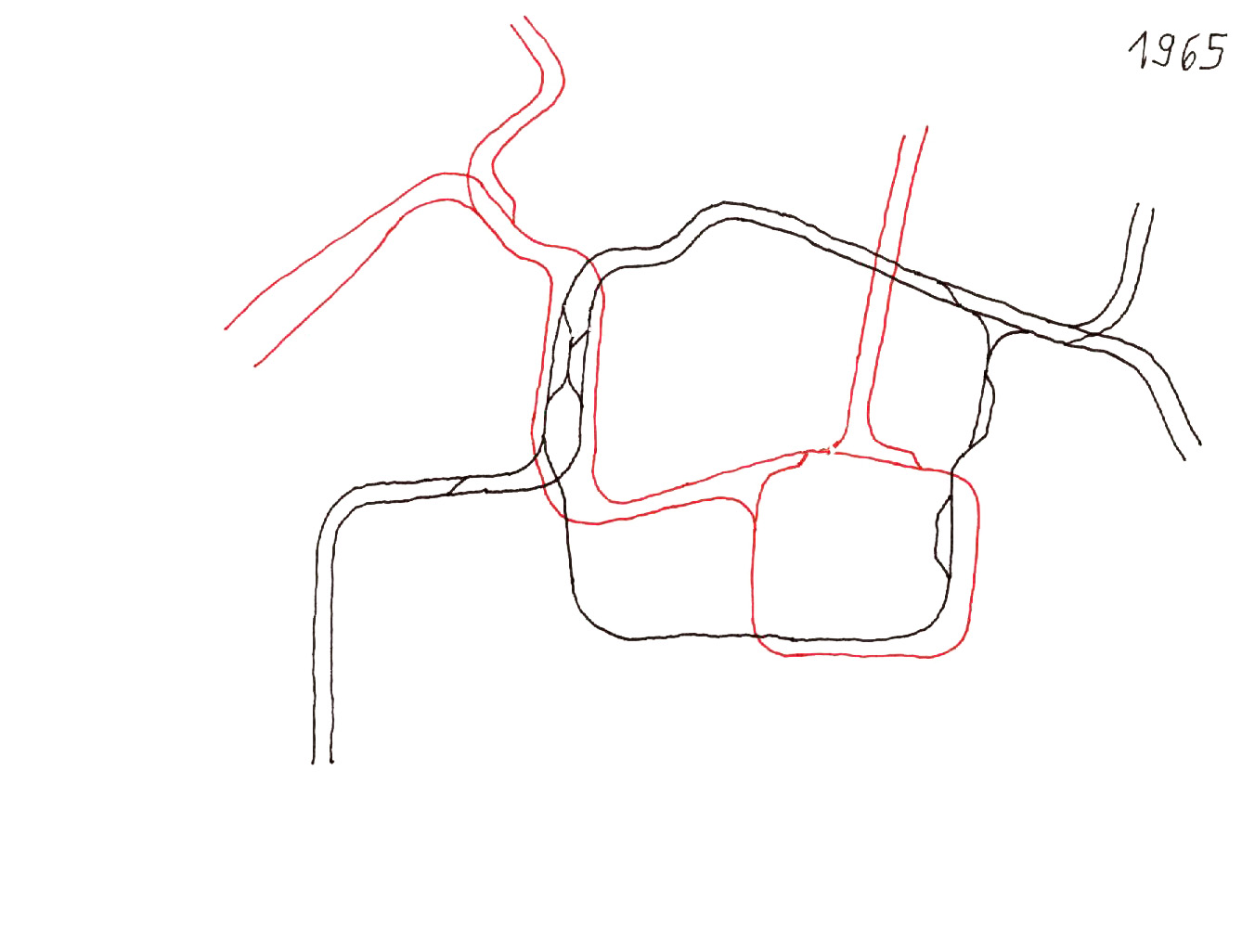
1965

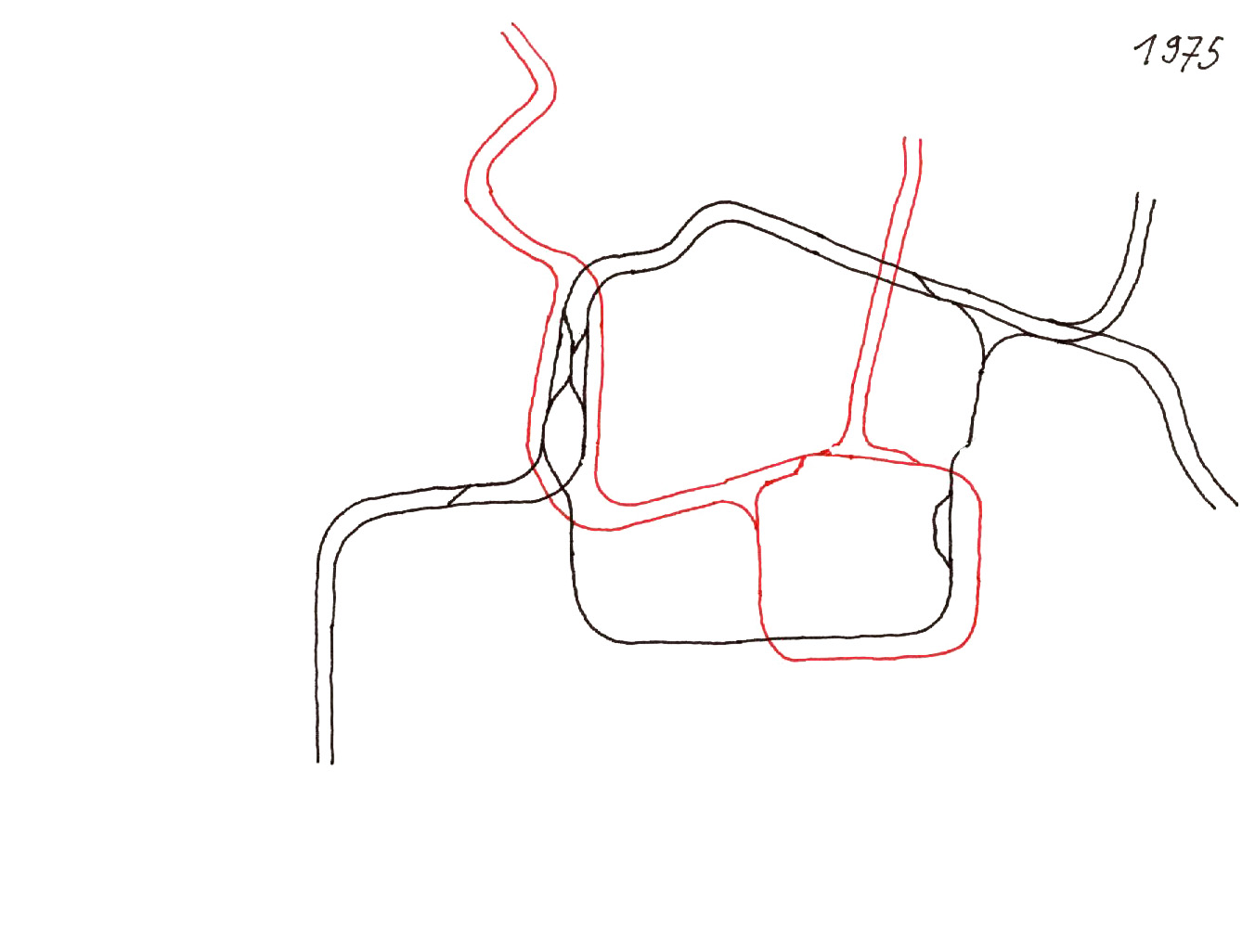
1975

In 1963, it was decided to phase-out trolleybus service. IVB wished to continue trolleybus operation, but was overruled by the city council, which declared that trolleybus service would be discontinued gradually over a period of several years. Among the reasons cited for the closure were to avoid the expense of modifying the wiring in the city centre for streets being converted from two-way to one-way traffic, that the fleet would need replacement within a few years, and that the system used a dedicated trolleybus-only depot that was inconveniently located at the outer end of one route.

Route B's Sundays-and-holidays service became motorbus-operated from 1 December 1968, and the route was converted fully to motorbuses on 30 June 1969. Route C closed on 26 April 1971, and soon afterwards all of the Italian vehicles were withdrawn, leaving in service only six trolleybuses purchased new from Gräf and Stift in 1947. The last route, A, closed on 29 February 1976.

=== Fleet ===
In 1941, an order was placed for 18 trolleybuses with chassis by Henschel, bodies by Kässbohrer and electrical equipment from AEG. However, the German government cancelled the order, as they wanted Henschel to focus on production of military vehicles, and they instead requisitioned several used trolleybuses from occupied Italy for Innsbruck in 1943–1944. First, five 10-metre-long (33 ft) Breda trolleybuses with electric equipment from TIBB came from Rome (Innsbruck fleet nos. 10–14, built in 1936). This was followed by eight 10-metre Fiat buses with electric equipment from CGE, specifically four from Livorno (IVB nos. 15–18, built in 1935/36) and later four Cansa-bodied units from San Remo (IVB nos. 19–22, ex-San Remo nos. 2, 3, 4, and 7; built in 1939).

In 1947, IVB ordered six new trolleybuses from the Austrian manufacturer Gräf & Stift, with electrical equipment from BBC, with fleet numbers 23–28. Model EO, they were delivered between 1948 and 1950. These were also 10 m long. The first two entered in service in February 1949, but the last two were not even delivered to IVB until April 1950.

The Gräf & Stift trolleybuses were equipped to tow passenger trailers. In 1951, to add capacity to route C, IVB modified two trailers previously used only with motorbuses for use with its trolleybuses. They were from a batch of seven built for IVB by Lohner-Werke in 1943 and carried fleet numbers 221 and 223. In 1954, a third trailer, no. 224, was similarly modified for use with trolleybuses. Trailer operation ended in 1970.

The ex-Rome trolleybuses had all been withdrawn by 1955. The ex-Livorno and ex-San Remo Fiats were overhauled for continued service, and the Livorno vehicles were fitted with new front ends. In the early 1960s, the Gräf & Stift vehicles were extensively rebuilt with modern front ends.

By the time of route C's closure in late April 1971, most of the Italian-built vehicles had been withdrawn. At least two ex-Livorno trolleybuses (16 and 18) remained in service in May 1971, but before long, the last Italian vehicles had been retired and only the six Austrian-built Gräf & Stift trolleybuses (23–28) remained in service, until the closure of the last route, in 1976.

== Second system ==
=== History ===
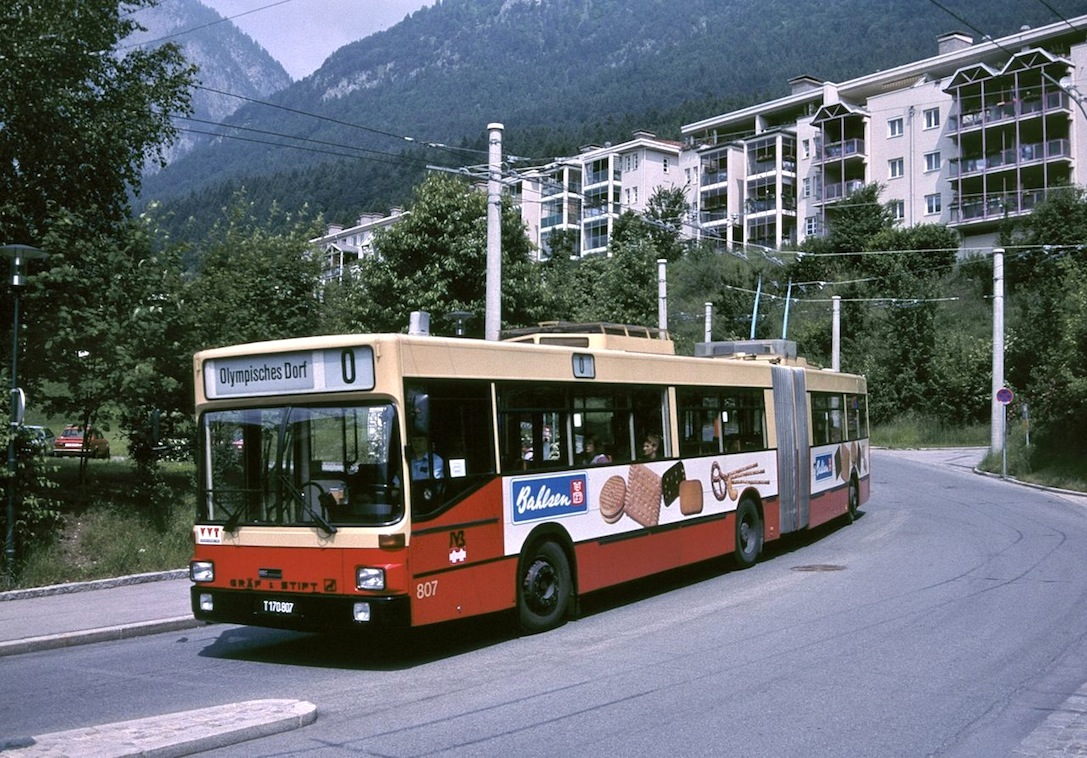
One of the 1988 high-floor trolleybuses on route O's Peerhofsiedlung branch, which opened in 1992 and replaced bus route P. A tram line now serves this location.

In February 1986, the decision was made to reintroduce trolleybuses to Innsbruck and specifically to convert the heavily used bus routes O and R to electric operation. The project replaced an earlier plan to extend the tram system to Reichenau, which was judged to be too expensive. Route O would run from Hauptbahnhof to Olympisches Dorf (Olympic Village) and route R from Hauptbahnhof to Reichenau. In November 1986, IVB placed an order with Gräf & Stift for 16 articulated trolleybuses, and installation of overhead wiring began in spring 1987.

On 17 December 1988, the new trolleybus system was opened, with routes O and R both converted to trolleybuses on that date. Routes O and R were served in the morning peak period with a headway of 5 and 6 minutes, respectively, whereas at all other times both routes operated at the same frequencies: 7 1/2 minutes in the afternoon/evening peak, 10 minutes in the daytime/midday period, and 15 minutes at quieter times.

In 1992, the trolleybus network was expanded. Route O was extended west of the city centre by several kilometres, with the outermost portion of the newly constructed section splitting into two branches, with alternate trips to go to either Allerheiligen or Peerhofsiedlung. The extension opened on 30 November 1992 and replaced motorbus routes L (to Allerheiligen) and P (to Peerhofsiedlung). To operate the expanded service, IVB purchased 10 new low-floor Gräf & Stift trolleybuses, which were among the first low-floor trolleybuses in the world.

Route number	Termini and routing
O	Allerheiligen/Peerhofsiedlung/Technik West – City Centre – Reichenau – Olympisches Dorf
R	Rehgasse – City Centre – Hauptbahnhof (main railway station) – Saggen – Reichenau – Gumppstrasse

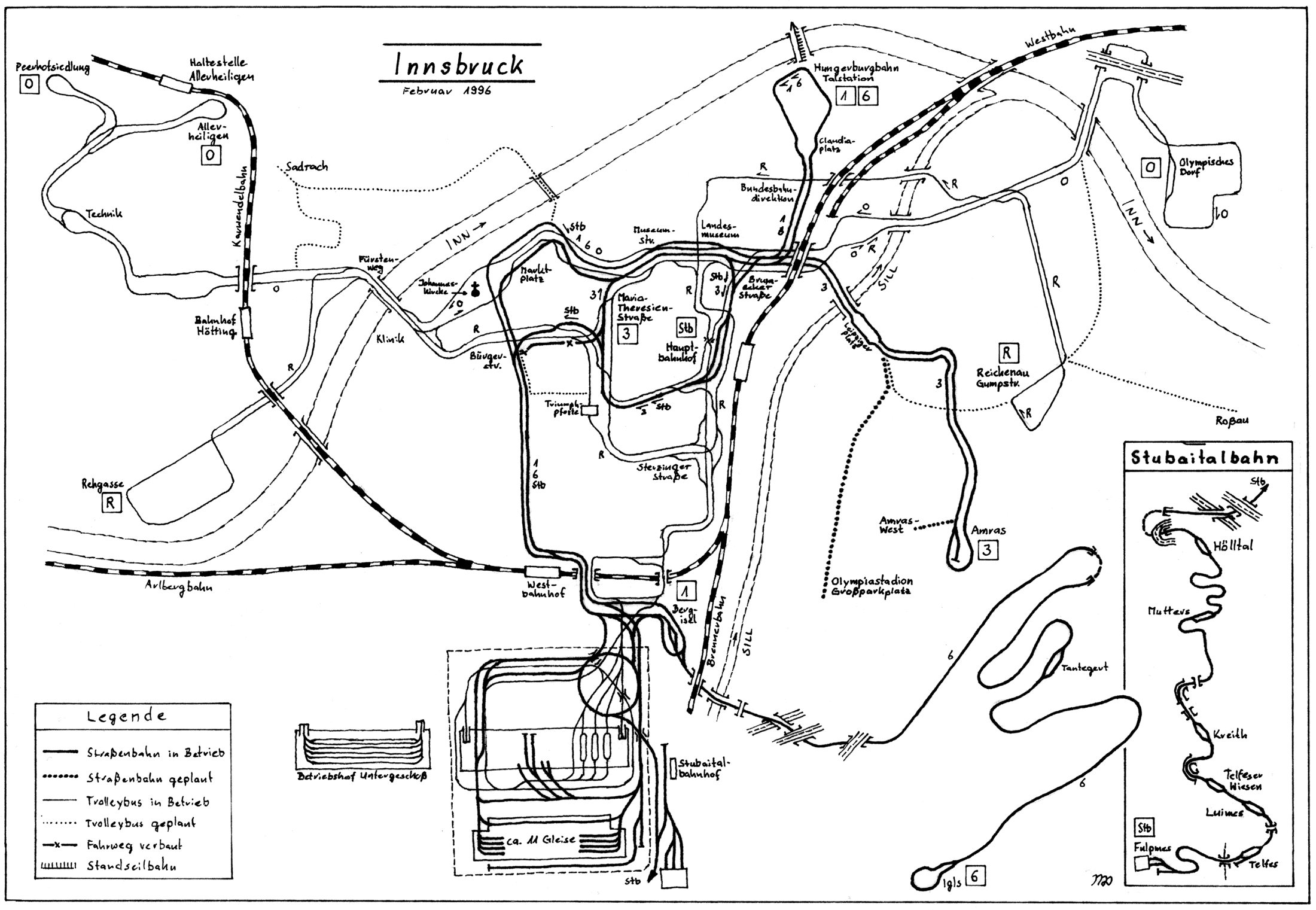
Map of the tram and trolleybus system as of 1996

On 1 December 1995, route R was extended west from the city centre to Höttinger Au (Rehgasse), replacing bus route B and more than doubling route R's length, to 8.4 km (5.2 mi). Route O was 10.5 km (6.5 mi) long at that time. Because IVB did not have enough trolleybuses to cover all service on the expanded network, motorbuses began to be used on some of route R's runs on a regular basis.

On 9 June 2001, a third branch of route O opened in the Hötting West district, to Technik West, to serve a new residential area. With this change, all three branches of route O at its west end were served every 15 minutes, with a 5-minute headway on the route's common section. From the same date, route R was changed to follow Kaiserjägerstrasse and Bienerstrasse in both directions, instead of only when inbound from Reichenau.

In 2000, as part of planning for the future of public transport in the city, it was concluded that a city the size of Innsbruck could no longer justify the higher expense of maintaining three distinct modes of public transport: trams, trolleybuses, and motorbuses. Discussions began on the closure of either the tram system or the trolleybus system, and by the end of 2001 it had been agreed that trolleybus service would be phased-out and the tram system expanded in its place.

Route R closed as a trolleybus line on 27 February 2005. Route O continued for another two years, until that last route of Innsbruck's second trolleybus system also closed, on 23 February 2007, with a farewell tour taking place two days later. As planned, the tram network was expanded to the areas previously served by trolleybuses. Since 2012, trams have run to Höttinger Au and since December 2017 to Peerhofsiedlung and Technik West. In 2019, a tram line to the Olympic Village was opened, thereby extending tram service to all of former route O except for the short Allerheiligen branch. Buses continue to serve former trolleybus route R.

=== Fleet ===
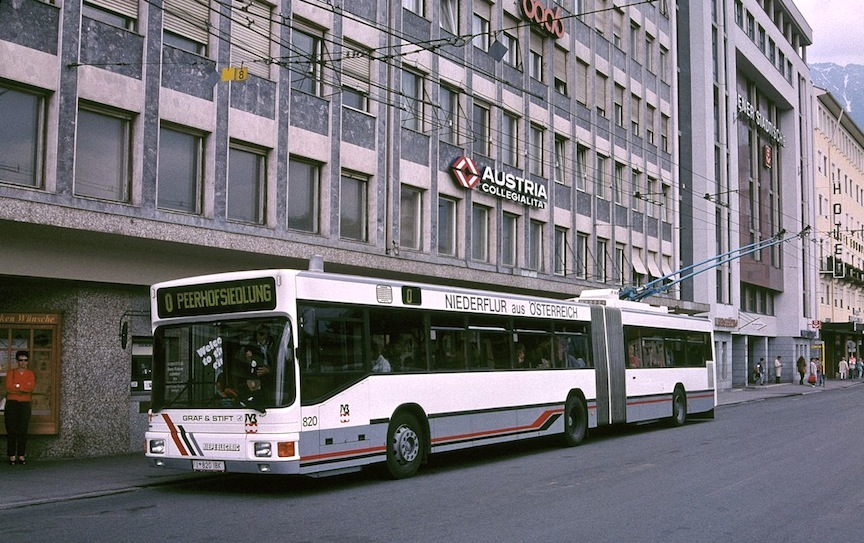
One of the 1992 Gräf & Stift vehicles that were some of the first low-floor trolleybuses anywhere

Numbers	Quantity	Manufacturer	Electrics	Model no.	Configuration	Year built
801–816	16	Gräf & Stift	BBC/ABB	GE150M18P	high-floor, articulated	1988
817–816	10	Gräf & Stift	Kiepe Electric	NGE152M	low-floor, articulated	1992

The fleet of high-floor trolleybuses was delivered in 1988. They were painted in a livery of red-and-cream/beige that was the same as that worn by IVB's trams at that time, and similar to the red-and-white livery worn by vehicles of the previous trolleybus system.

The first of the low-floor trolleybuses was delivered in May 1992, and the new vehicles entered service on or by 30 November 1992, when route O was extended. They introduced a new livery for Innsbruck trolleybuses, of white with light grey lower skirt panels and red and black stripes, which was IVB's livery for low-floor vehicles. In the late 1990s, all-over advertising wraps began to appear on some trolleybuses. In 1998, one of the high-floor trolleybuses (815) was repainted into the mostly white livery previously worn only by high-floor vehicles.

The first two trolleybuses were withdrawn in 2003. By autumn 2003, most of the older (high-floor) trolleybuses had been repainted into the mostly white livery. The remaining high-floor trolleybuses were taken out of service upon the closure of route R in February 2005, but some were returned to service in summer 2005, for use on route O for several weeks starting on 18 July, to replace motorbuses that had been providing some service on that route but were needed for temporary tram-replacement service. The last high-floor trolleybuses were withdrawn on 21 March 2006.

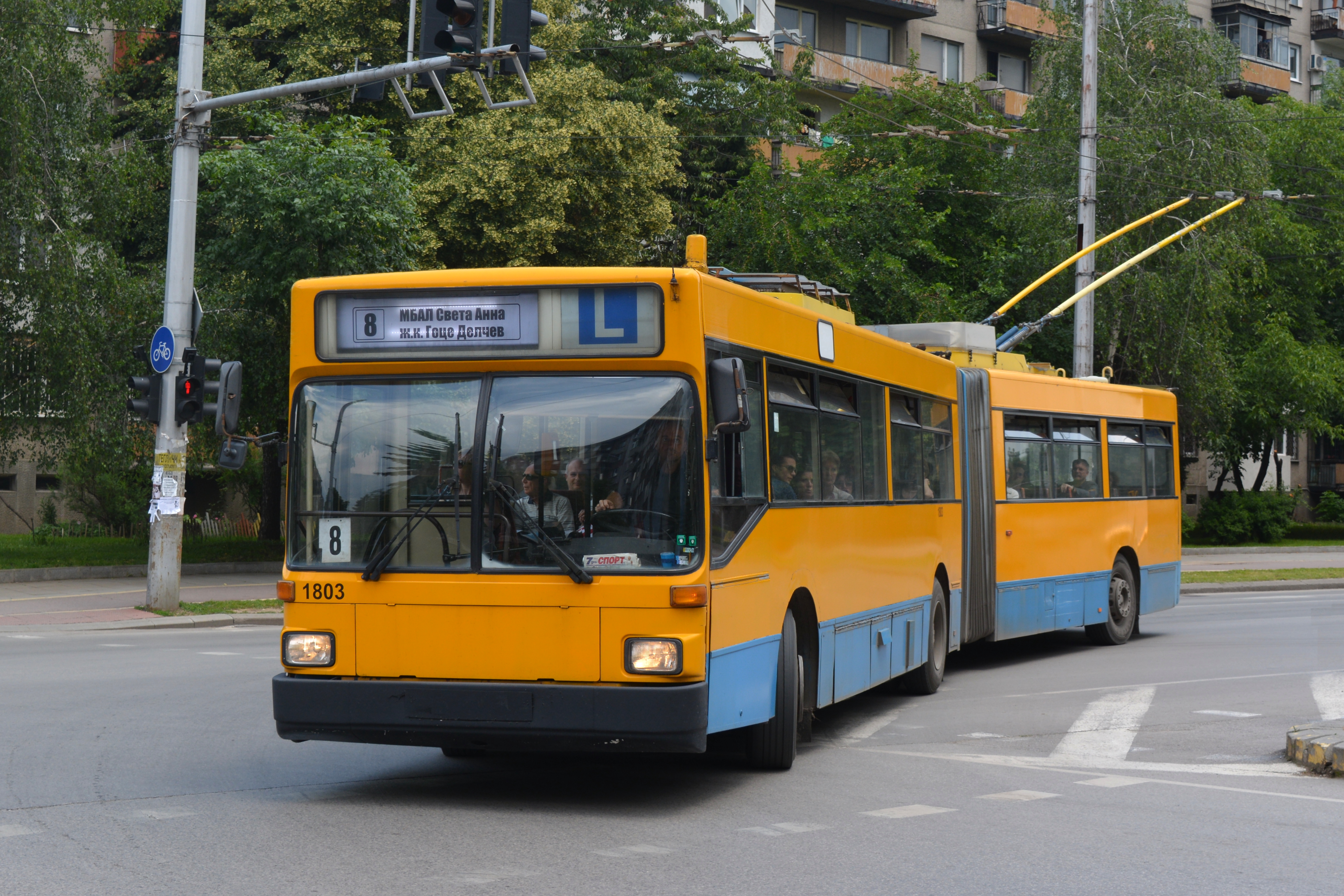
Former Innsbruck trolleybus 815 in service in Sofia in 2016

After their withdrawal, the 16 high-floor trolleybuses passed to trolleybus systems in Eastern Europe for further use. Eight of the 16 went to the Sofia trolleybus system, in Bulgaria (nos. 801, 802, 805, 807, 810, 814, 815 and 816), and the other eight went to Brașov, in Romania (nos. 803, 804, 806, 808, 809, and 811–813). After the system's closure in 2007, the ten low-floor vehicles were sold to Vologda, Russia.

== Planned new system ==
In 2021, city officials announced an intention to convert all public transport in the city to electric vehicles, in order to satisfy a new European Union directive requiring that a minimum of 65 percent of new bus purchases be electric by 2030. As part of this goal, consideration would be given to bringing back trolleybuses. In November 2024, IVB and representatives of the Salzburg trolleybus system jointly signed a framework agreement with manufacturer Carrosserie Hess for the provision of new trolleybuses, with potentially up to 20 for Innsbruck but without any obligation for IVB to purchase any. In April 2026, it was announced that IVB intended to proceed with a purchase of 20 trolleybuses and convert routes C and R to trolleybuses, along with night-time routes N1 and N3. The order was placed on 2 June 2026. Like most new trolleybuses built in the 2020s, the new vehicles will have in-motion charging capability and batteries sufficiently powerful to allow extensive use in passenger service running on battery power only. This will permit both new routes to have sections that lack overhead wires. Only around 50% of the total route length of 18.2 km (11.3 mi) is to be equipped with wires. The overhead trolley wiring that is to be installed will be entirely outside the city centre. The new, third Innsbruck trolleybus system is projected to open in 2029, more specifically December 2029.

The new system will again be operated by IVB, which is 51% owned by the municipal utilities group IKB,^{[DE]} 45% by the city of Innsbruck, and 4% by the state of Tyrol (as of 2019).

== See also ==
- List of trolleybus systems
