= Trams in Innsbruck =

- Logo IVB

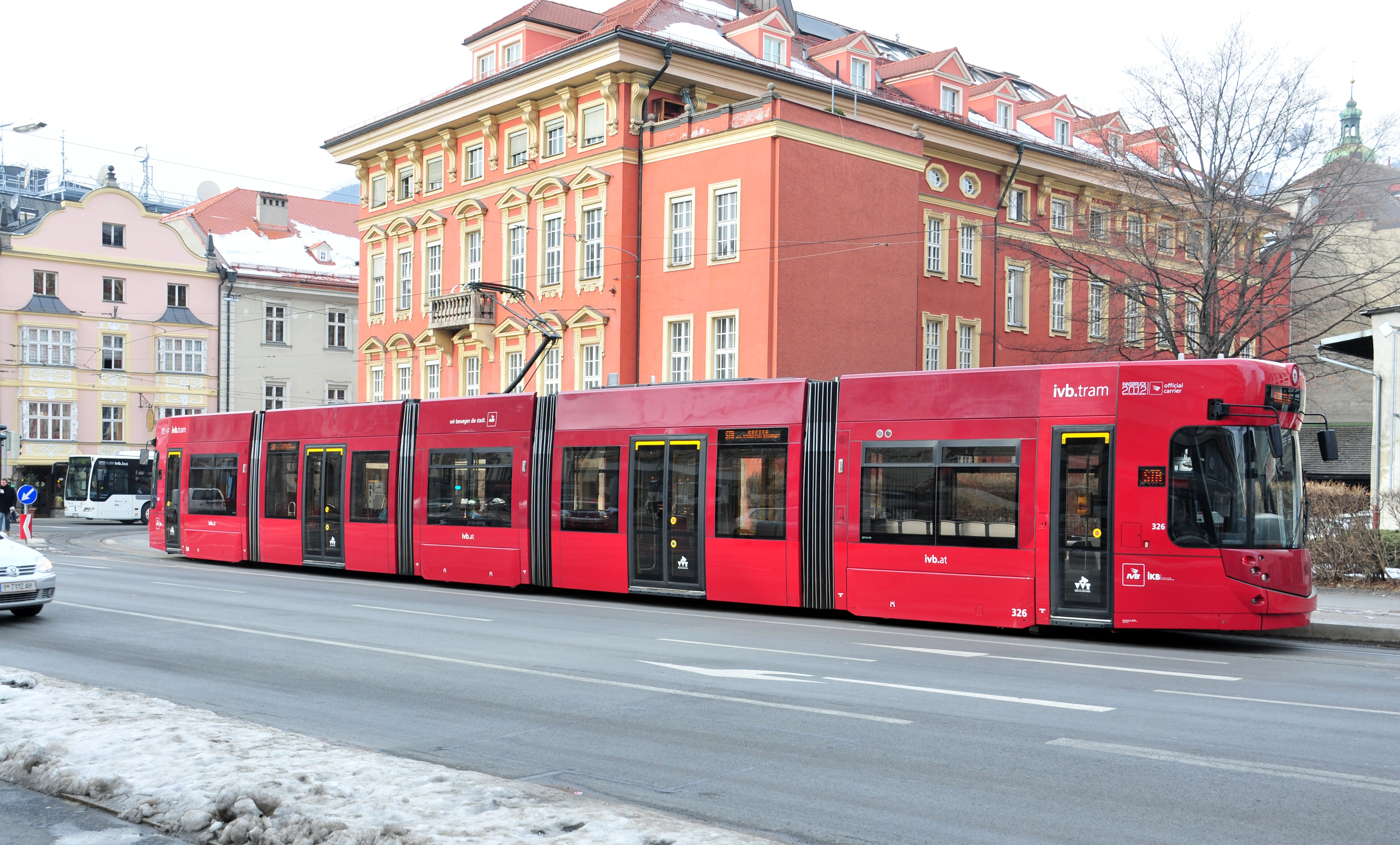
- Innsbruck Bombardier Flexity Outlook tram in 2012

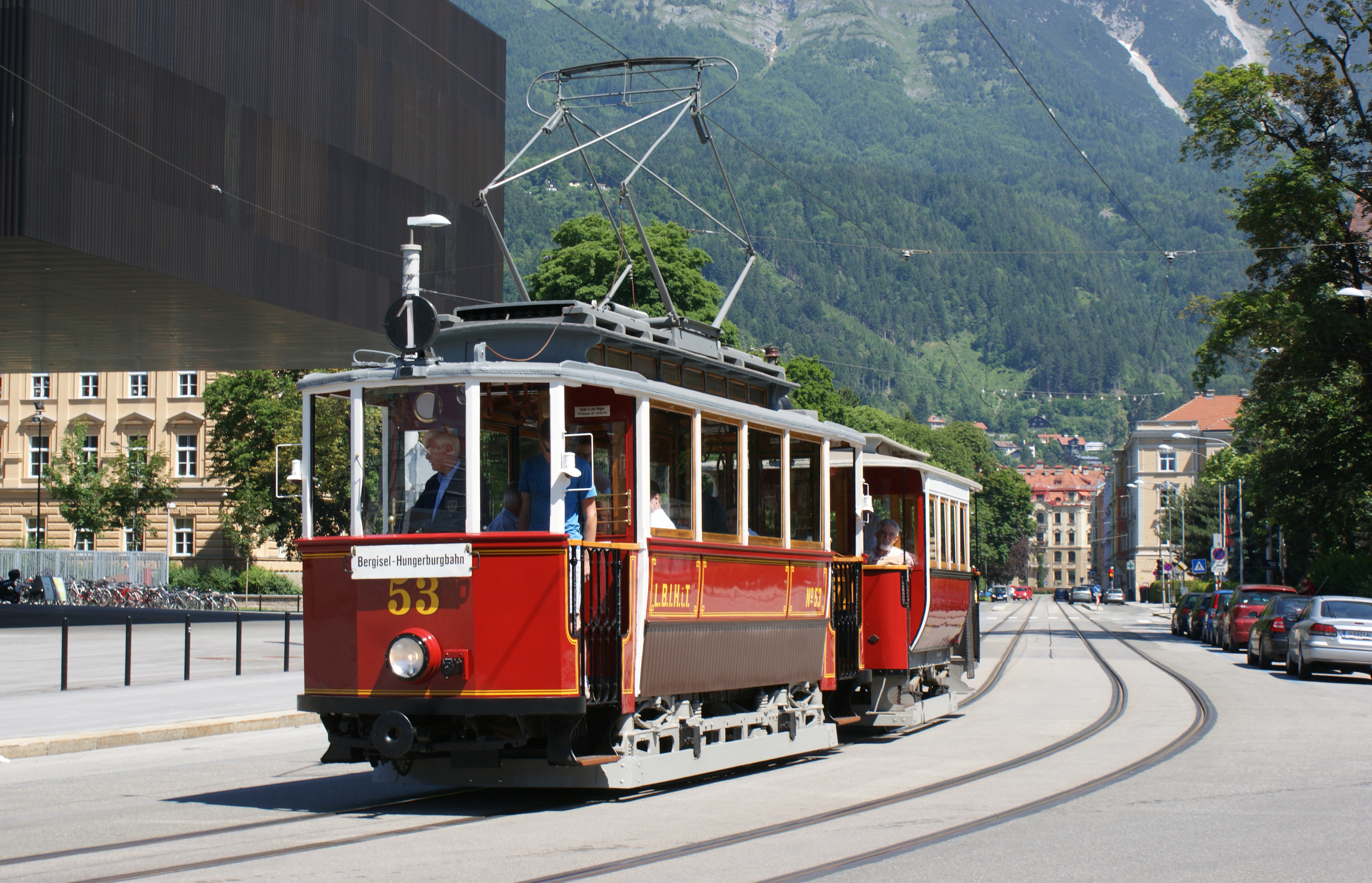
- Tramcar 53 (1910) and trailer 111 (1900), from the Tiroler MuseumsBahnen

Overview
- Locale: Innsbruck, Tirol, Austria
- Transit type: Tram
- Number of lines: 6 (2024)
- Number of stations: 62 (+18 STB )

Operation
- Began operation: 15 July 1905 (electric trams)
- Operators: Localbahn Innsbruck–Hall in Tirol (L.B.I.H.i.T / Local Innsbruck-Hall Rail Company) 1905-1941; Innsbruck Transport Company (Innsbrucker Verkehrsbetriebe und Stubaitalbahn / IVB) (1941 to date)

Technical
- System length: 26.6 km (16.5 mi) (+18.2 km (11.3 mi) STB )
- Track gauge: 1,000 mm (3 ft 3 3/8 in) metre gauge
- Electrification: 900 V DC, Overhead wires
- Average speed: 16.5 km/h (10.3 mph)
- Top speed: 50 km/h (31 mph)
Innsbruck tram network (2023)
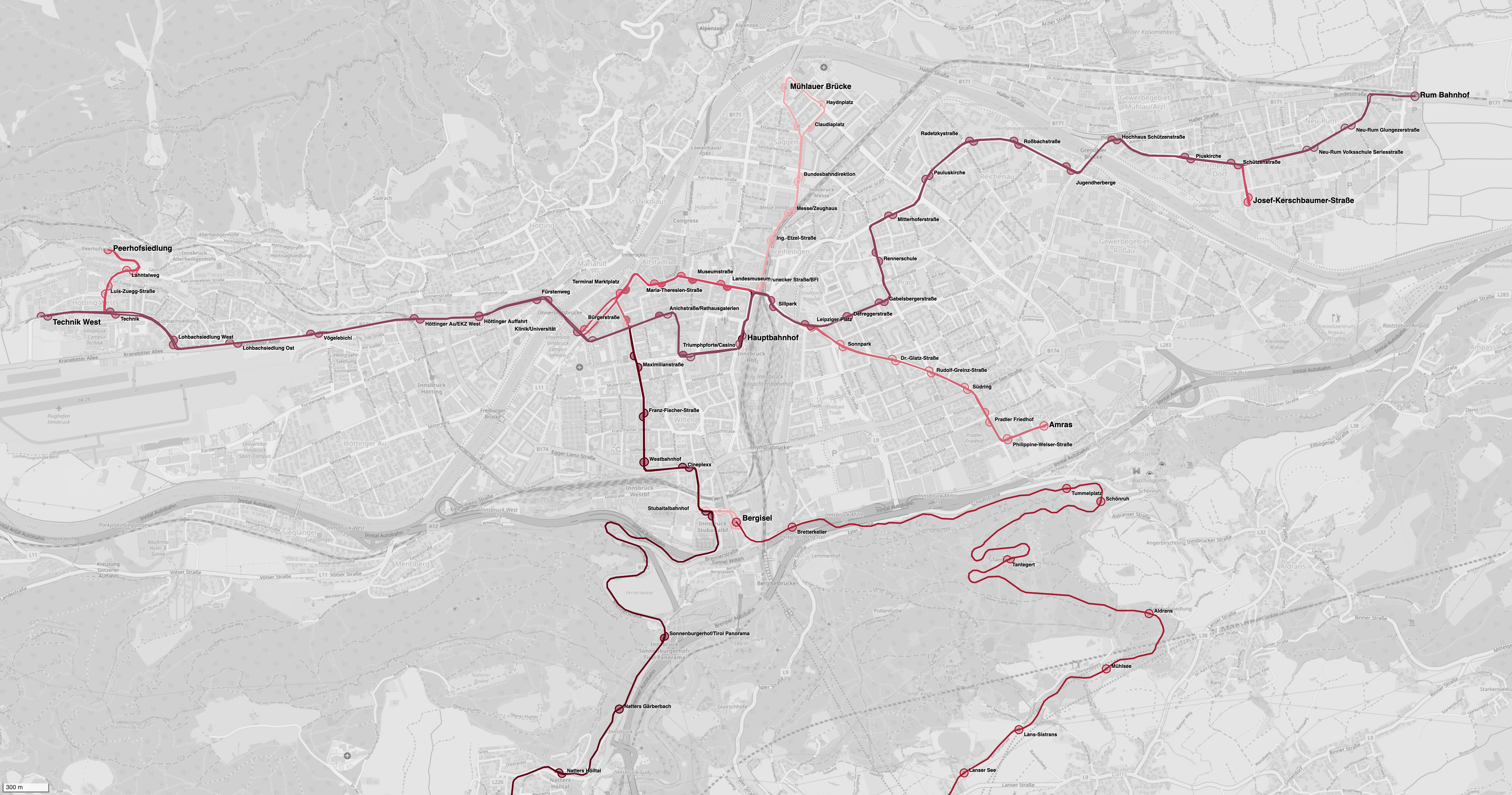

Line 1 Bergisel - Mühlauer Brücke

Overview
- Native name: Linie 1
- Termini: Bergisel; Mühlauer Brücke
- Stations: 18
- Color on map: burnished brown

History
- Current route since: 1995

Technical
- Line length: 4.9 km (3.0 mi)

The Innsbruck tram network is currently organised over six routes (numbered 1, 2, 3, 5, 6, and STB) and has a total length of 44 kilometres (27 mi).

Electrification of the service dates back to 1905, which was rather late by comparison to cities of similar size elsewhere in Austria.

The Stubai Valley Railway (or Stubaitalbahn), which shares the one-meter gauge of the city's tram system, currently is also served by trams and shares some of the city centre tramlines: it uses the same tracks as tram routes 1 and 3 between its former terminus station (known until 1983 as the Stubaitalbahnhof) and Innsbruck's main railway station.

The Innsbruck tram network is operated by the Innsbrucker Verkehrsbetriebe und Stubaitalbahn company.

== History ==
=== 1905–08 ===
The first tramline opened for public service on 15 July 1905. It was in effect an extension of the service provided by the existing L.B.I.H.i.T which had been operating a one-meter gauge steam railway service between the south-western edge of Innsbruck and Hall in Tirol, ten kilometers to the east, since 1891. The new tramline was 2.3 km (1.4 mi) long, connecting the Südbahnhof (south station) with the Staatsbahnhof (main station - today known as the west station). A branch line led from the Staatsbahnhof, over an iron bridge across the Arlberg railway line, to the Bergiselbahnhof on the edge of the city. Initially the tram service operated only between 07:00 and 20:00. The trams were powered by DC electricity from 500 Volt overhead wires.

Even before the first line opened, work was already under way on an extension. The 1.7-kilometre (1.1 mi) long Saggen line opened on 18 November 1905. This section branched off the city tramline at Museum Street, followed the Südbahn viaduct in the direction of the mainline railway, continuing on to Adolf Pichler Street (today Conrad Street). Once the Saggen line had opened, it was operated by a shuttle service, which met up with the city tramline at Museum Street.

Ten two-axle electric tramcars were purchased from the Graz railcar company to operate the new network, and these came into service with the fleet numbers 36–42 for the tramcars serving the city line and 43–45 for the three tramcars operating the Saggen branch shuttle service. Passenger numbers increased rapidly and several small unpowered carriages were taken from the (still at this stage steam powered) L.B.I.H.i.T railway, to be used in combination with the new tramcars for the city tram services. The L.B.I.H.i.T service between Innsbruck and Hall in Tirol (Solbad Hall) could not easily spare these cars, and in 1906 the company acquired four new unpowered-trailer tramcars. Additionally, two open-ended summer cars were transferred from another local one-meter mountain railway and adapted for use with the trams. These were already kitted-out with electric lighting and electric heating.

The opening in 1906 of the Hungerburg funicular provided a reason for a further extension of the tram network and also the occasion for arguments involving the city council over the route to be followed. In the end a new line was constructed, which opened in 1908, between the Andreas Hofer Street, along Maximilian Street, to the South Station, effectively incorporating the former Saggen line from Museum Street. Two additional powered tramcars (46 and 47) were acquired to serve the extended line.

=== 1909–11 ===
In 1909 work finally started on electrification of the Innsbruck–Hall in Tirol line. At the same time there was a more general reconfiguration involving the routes into the city of other local meter gauge mountain railways, which also involved an expansion of the city tram network. A new tram line was constructed linking local termini of mountain railways with the city centre. This line ran from the Staatsbahnhof (main station) to the Dollinger Inn at the Chain Bridge.

With the opening of the new line, the network acquired route numbers. The new line was Line 2, while the Saggen line from Museum Street became Line 1. The original city line became Line 3 and the meter gauge railway to Hall in Tirol was integrated into the tram network as Line 4, although it continued to be known locally as The Haller line, Haller being the adjective form of the placename Hall. For the newly electrified Line 4, eight four-axle powered tramcars were ordered from the Graz railcar company, and these took over the identity numbers 1–8 from the steam locomotives which they replaced. For Line 2 a further six powered two-axle city tramcars were acquired. These used the numbers 48–54. (Tramcar 53 can be seen at the nearby railway museum.) This latest batch used so-called Fast running motors (Schnellläufermotoren) which were more powerful than the motors of the existing twin axle city trams.

By the start of 1910 the electrification of Line 4 had been completed. The last steam train ran on the line on 6 January 1910, to be replaced with a 1000 V direct current electric traction. Then 29 carriages that had served the line were adapted for use as unpowered-trailer-tramcars on the same route. Within the city centre the tram service was ever more popular, and Line 1, originally the Saggen line, was often operated with a three-tramcar train.

=== 1911–14: The Pradl extension and other enhancements ===
In 1911, detailed planning for an extension of Line 3 to Amras, the south-eastern quarter on Innsbruck, resumed. The idea dated back at least to 1908 but had then been deferred, partly due to a lack of suitable street layout, but this was a period of urban expansion and renewal on the eastside of the city. The preferred route for the extension started from Museum Street, and passed over the river at the Gas Works Bridge, and along Defregger Street, Pradler Street and the Amraser Street to Amras. The streets along the entire route were still not suitable, so initially work was started only on a line extension as far as Pradl, on the eastern side of the city centre. The new Gas Works Bridge had been built to an extra strong specification in order to be able to take the weight of a tram, but after the bridge it turned out that, due to miscalculations at the design stage, although the bridge was indeed strong enough to take the weight of a tram, it was not strong enough to support the greater weight of a tram with people on it. What resulted, therefore, was a shuttle service between the Gas Works Bridge and the tram terminus at Pradl on one side of the bridge, and the rest of Line 3 running from the other side of the Gas Works Bridge along Maximilian Street. In the middle, passengers had to quit the tram and cross the bridge on foot.

Nevertheless, for the extra length of line four more city tramcars with the numbers 32–35 were purchased. As matters turned out, this would be the city's last significant purchase of new tramcars for fifty years.

In 1911, a new tramcar numbering scheme was introduced. Powered tramcars retained their existing numbers. Unpowered-trailer-tramcars were each allocated a three-digit number starting with a 1. Some trailer-tramcars taken over from local mountain railway systems retained their existing numbers which already conformed to this scheme, while trailer-tramcars acquired for the city tramway or for the old Innsbruck-Hall railway (Now Line 4) had their numbers changed. The goods wagons operating on the tram network were all renumbered with a new three-digit code, starting with a 2.

In 1912, the L.B.I.H.i.T was operating four single-track tramlines, using 31 powered tramcars, 33 unpowered trailer-tramcars, 6 goods wagon and a snow plow wagon. In 1913, a new bridge was planned over the River Sill, strong enough to take the weight of a tram and its passengers, so that Line 3 could run all the way to Pradl without a break: the bridge was ready in 1914. By 1914 work had also been completed on the first stage of replacing the single-track city tram lines with twin tracks.

=== 1914–18: War ===
Line 2 Josef-Kerschbaumer-Straße - Peerhofsiedlung

Overview
- Native name: Linie 2
- Termini: Josef-Kerschbaumer-Straße; Peerhofsiedlung
- Stations: 29
- Color on map: dark indian red

History
- Current route since: January 26, 2019

Technical
- Line length: 9.9 km (6.2 mi)

For the Innsbruck trams, the immediate impact of the outbreak of war in July 1914 was economic. It became hard to obtain replacement parts. There was a shortage of working-age people to operate the trams, and there were difficulties with regard to funding. In 1914, many workers were taken off the trams to work on railways of greater strategic importance, and for two months Lines 2 and 3 had to stop running. Also in 1914 an extra siding was built at the South Station to facilitate the transfer of wounded soldiers, and in 1916 Line 3 was lengthened in order to provide a tram link from this station to the health facility (today the Conrad Barracks) at Amras. In 1916 two additional tram trailer-cars were purchased second hand from the Lana-Merano mountain railway. Maintenance staff became ever more inventive at finding ways to keep the trams operating despite the absence of replacement parts.

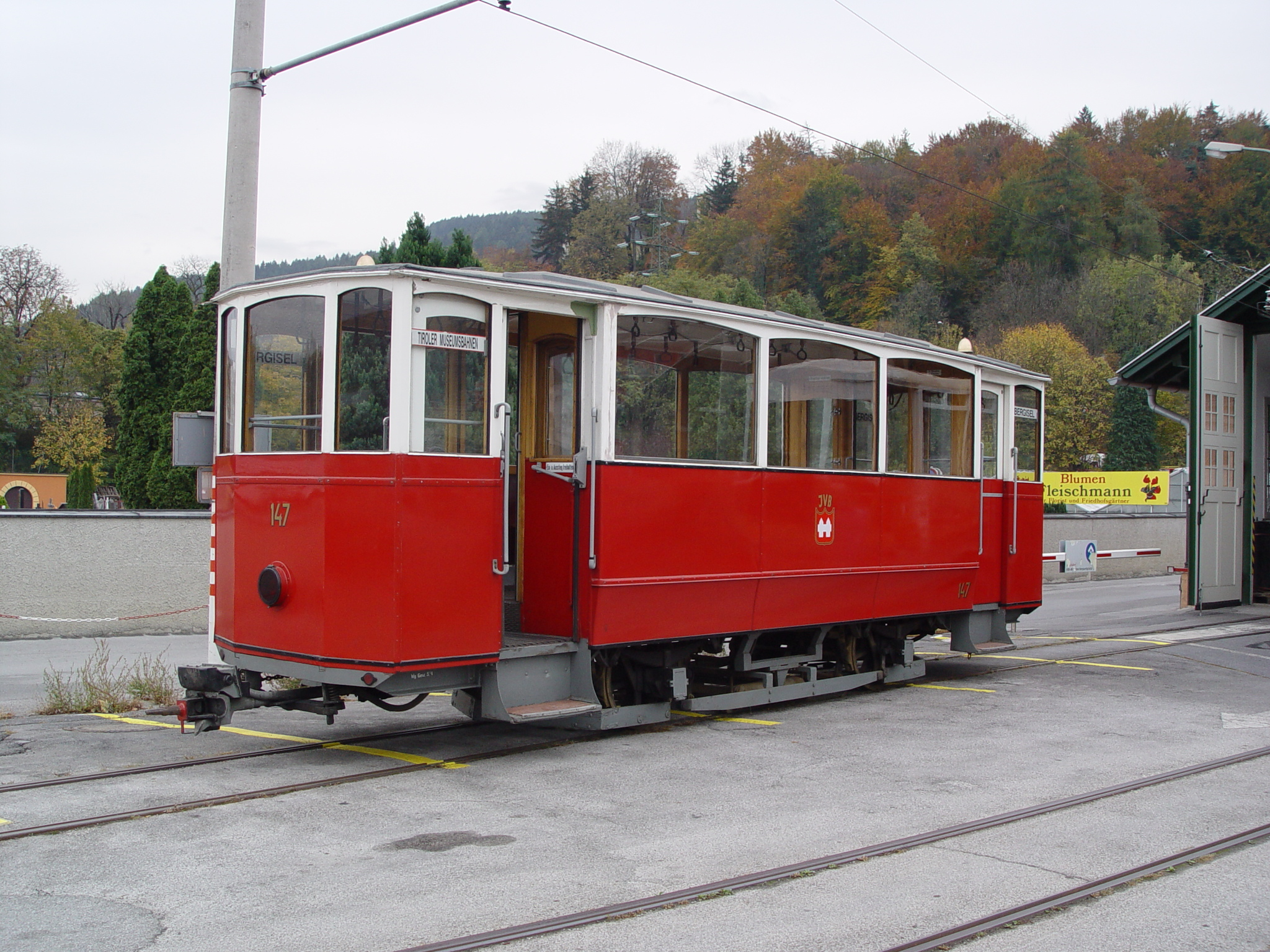
Non-powered tram trailer-car 147, no longer with a roof lantern, and now featuring a sliding door to make it suitable for legal city centre use in the 21st century

In 1918, the L.B.I.H.i.T. purchased four secondhand steam-powered tram engines from Geneva in order to free up more electric tramcars for transporting wounded soldiers in the city centre. However, beyond a few trial runs on the Hall line these were little used before the war ended at the end of 1918.

=== 1919–38: Between wars ===
Despite acute financial austerity following the war, talk of expanding the Innsbruck tram network resurfaced. Line 3 was extended to the Pradler Cemetery, and more of the remaining single-track stretches of tramline in the city centre were replaced with double track. At the end of 1920 parts of the track along Line 2 had to be replaced due to the use of defective parts during the years of parts shortages. From 1921, the route taken by Line 3 was shortened again, no longer going all the way to the Cemetery. On 27 June 1923, the L.B.I.H.i.T. opened a new line, identified as Line 0. This was a ring line round the central part of Innsbruck, sharing track with existing lines and opened in response to demands from the city council for a permanent uninterrupted tram connection from the main station to the city centre. However, for some reason the line was not a success and two months later services on Line 0 were withdrawn, and alternative options were considered. Line 0 services returned on 1 May 1924, but the subject of the ring route continued to generate disagreement, and there followed further withdrawals and restorations of the service. 1924 was also the year in which Line 1 - once known as the Saggen branch line - was extended and integrated with Line 3, reducing the need for people to change trams. In 1925, Line 5 was introduced which partly compensated for the withdrawal (again) of the Line 0 service, and in this year it was also possible to return Line 2 to operation, briefly, before the frequency of technical breakdowns led to it being suspended again. New track was installed extending Line 3 from the Regional Court Building (Landesgericht) to Wiltener Square, and the next year an as necessary service replaced the scheduled service on the route of Line 5.

In 1928, the city end terminus halt of Line 4 was repositioned from Bergisel to Wiltener Square. In 1930, traffic in Innsbruck switched to driving on the right side of the road, which necessitated numerous costly adaptations to the tram network. A reconfiguration in 1930/31 involved the removal of Line 5 and a compensating forking for Line 1, with the branch from Bergisel to the main station now designated as Line 1B. Further reconfigurations followed in 1932 in the backwash from the world economic crisis.

=== 1939–45: More war ===
Line 3 Amras - Anichstraße (Rathausgalerien)

Overview
- Native name: Linie 3
- Termini: Amras; Anichstraße (Rathausgalerien)
- Stations: 12
- Color on map: dark cuban rhythm

History
- Current route since: January 26, 2019

Technical
- Line length: 4.8 km (3.0 mi)

The rebuilding of the Mühlauer Bridge was completed during the Nazi years, creating a major new road approach for the city. In 1939 the rails for the local line to Solbad Hall (as Hall in Tirol had recently been renamed) were added to the new road over the bridge, and from now Line 4 used the rails of Line 1 to approach the Mühlauer Bridge. In 1941, old rails were recycled to double the rest of Line 3 and build a new double-track section for it, now extending to Rudolf Greinz Street where a turning loop was created. 1941 was also the year in which the Innsbruck Transport Company (Innsbrucker Verkehrsbetriebe), incorporating the former L.B.I.H.i.T. along with several local bus operations, was founded.

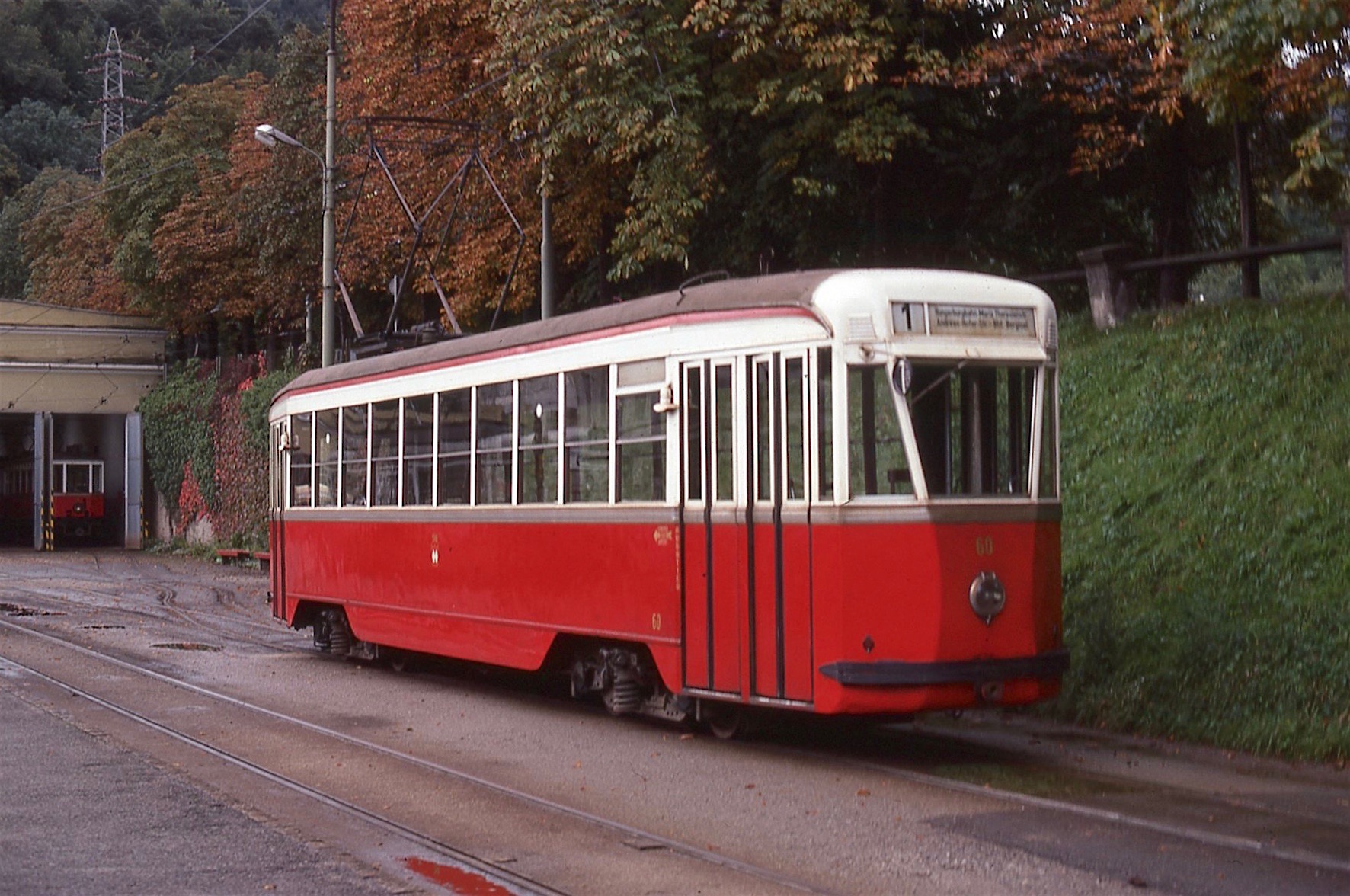
The tramcar built by Ernesto Breda of Milan, originally for Belgrade but delivered instead to Innsbruck in 1944

The war years saw a sharp increase in passenger numbers, with 14.5 million tram journeys recorded annually by 1942. Plans to purchase new tramcars had to be abandoned, however, because armaments production took priority for the manufacturers. Nevertheless, supplies of replacement parts continued to be available. In 1944, a tramcar joined the fleet that had been intended for the Belgrade tram network. This high-capacity tram produced by the Ernesto Breda company of Milan entered service as tramcar No.60; its modern features quickly made it a particular favourite with drivers and passengers alike.

During the war years the route of Line 6 was on several occasions badly damaged by bombers. Towards the end of the war a growing number of tramcars were damaged by the fighting, and non-availability of replacement parts became more of a problem. One powered tramcar had to be rebuilt as an unpowered trailer-tramcar. Nevertheless, four powered cars and five trailer cars were destroyed during the bombing.

=== 1945–60: Reconstruction during austerity ===
After the war the destroyed sections of line were rapidly reconstructed, so that trams were again operating on all lines by August 1945. Restoring a complete tram fleet took longer however. In 1947, Winterthur donated a powered tramcar to Solbad Hall, which was its Swiss partner city; this started a necessary increase in the stock of usable powered tramcars. There were plans to buy new tramcars in 1949, but these had to be deferred due to lack of money. In 1950, however, seven powered tramcars were purchased from Basel, which eased the pressure. For the next two years the green ex-Basel trams stood out from the rest because there were no funds available for paint to paint them in the livery of the Innsbruck tram fleet. Two more trams came from Basel in 1952, and in 1953 several more secondhand Swiss tramcars were purchased, this time from Thun. However, these were found unsuitable for the longer Line 4 (the Hall line), so the unpowered trailer-trams were used on the local Stubai Valley Railway, and the powered tramcars were used chiefly for shunting work. In 1955, it was possible to get hold of another four powered tramcars: these came from Zürich. Little by little during the 1950s the newer tramcars from Switzerland were used to replace Innsbruck's original tram fleet, much of which still dated back to the early decades of the 20th century. As they were acquired the newer trams were themselves modernised, being fitted with up-to-date compact coupling mechanisms. Brakes were fitted to any unbraked axles. Less- antiquated tramcars in the Innsbruck fleet that were not scheduled to be pensioned-off received similar upgrades to their coupling mechanisms and brakes.

In 1956, the new Concert Bridge was ready, and it was possible to remove the old iron tram bridge that had crossed over the Arlberg railway line, all of which allowed for further minor rationalisation of the tramline layout in this part of the city centre.

=== 1960–75: Further modernisation and more buses ===
The 1960s were years of strong economic growth supported by (relatively) stable oil prices. The IVB continued to upgrade the tram fleet. In 1960, six high-capacity tramcars from the Vienna Lohner were purchased and placed in service. company entered service, allocated the tramcar numbers 61–66. At the Bergisel terminus halt a triangular platform was installed in June 1960 in order to enable trams to turn around: four months later, in October, the triangular platform was replaced by a more conventional terminal loop. Further detailed reconfiguration and rationalisation of the network in the city centre took place, and Line 4 now terminated at the Main Railway station rather than Wiltner Place. In 1964, the track along Leopold Street to Wiltener Place was lifted, after which Line 3 also traveled by way of the Main station. The last network expansion for thirty years took place in 1965 with the extension of Line 3 to what is still its terminus halt at Amras. The acquisition in 1966 and 1967 of seven Lohner articulated trams, similar to those being introduced in Vienna around the same time, and numbered 71–77, made it possible to retire the last of the old pre-war Innsbruck powered tramcars.

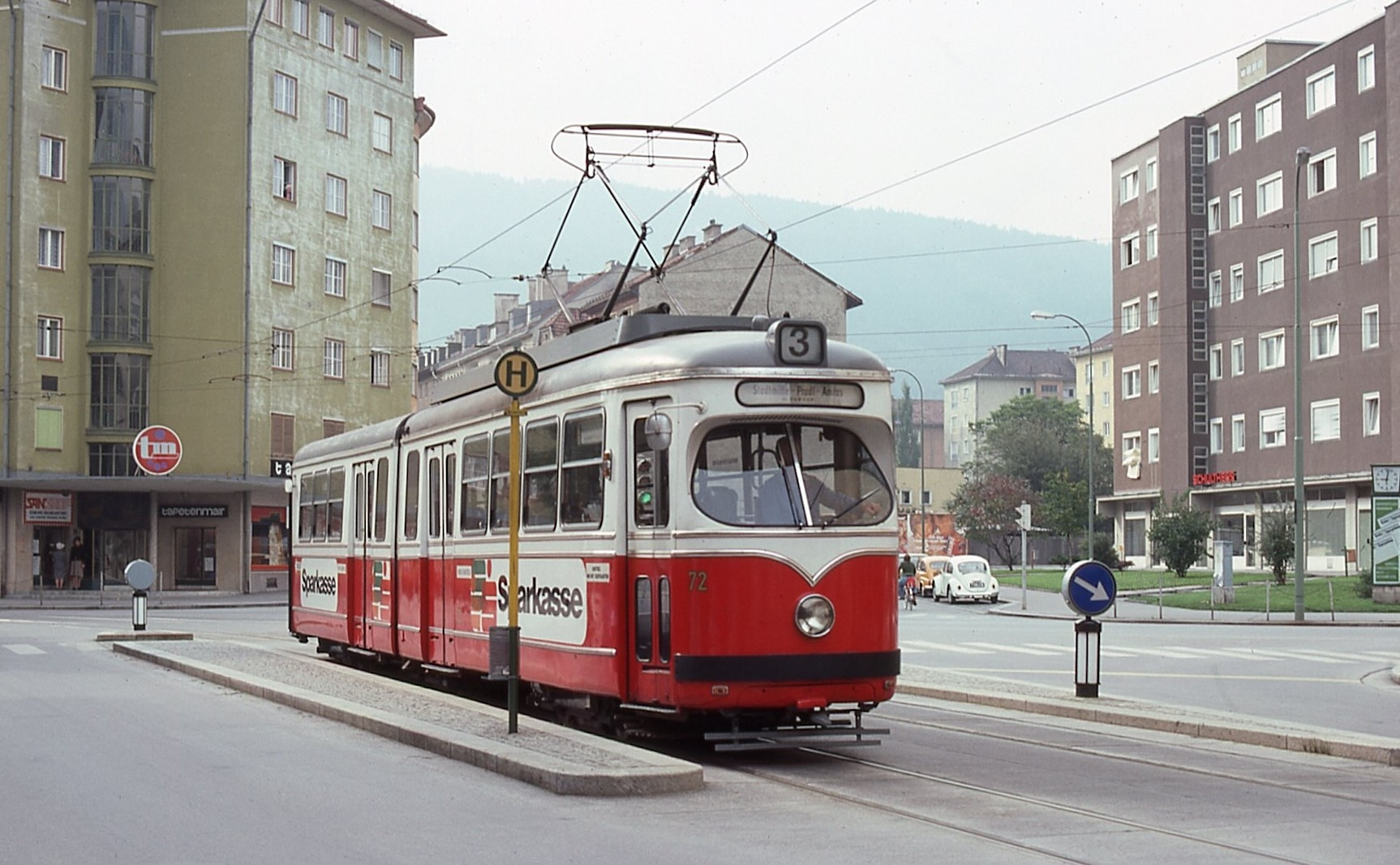
One of the seven Lohner articulated trams purchased in 1966/67

Plans for the 1976 Winter Olympics placed the future of Line 4 (the Hall-in-Tirol line) in question. The Reichenauer Bridge had to be renewed and the Haller Street widened to four lanes, which would require a major rebuild for the tramlines using it. The decision was instead taken to remove the rail tracks from the road and operate the service with buses. The last tram ran on Line 4 on 6 June 1974 and the bus service along the route was inaugurated on 7 June 1974. Much of the rolling stock used for the former Hall-in-Tirol line had become very old and was now retired. Other tramcars were reallocated to Line 6, while one had already been rendered inoperable when one of its bogies had been cannibalised to replace a damaged sub-assembly on another vehicle.

=== 1976–83: Winter Olympics and aftermath ===
Line 6 Bergisel - Igls

Overview
- Native name: Linie 6
- Termini: Bergisel; Igls
- Stations: 10
- Color on map: dark maroon

History
- Current route since: 1900

Technical
- Line length: 8.4 km (5.2 mi)
- Num of tracks: single track

A major review of transport led, in 1976, to the publication of a General Transport Plan for Innsbruck (Generalverkehrsplans). The detailed improvements to the street layouts which the plan envisaged involved a costly list of track rearrangements and realignments: consideration was given to replacing Innsbruck's trams with articulated buses. Line 6 and the Stubai Valley Railway would need to be repositioned on the south side of the city because of the route selected for the Inn Valley Autobahn extension. In the end the city council decided to fund the construction projects necessary to incorporate the trams into the city's updated streetscape. The necessary changes were implemented during the summer of 1976, following which the network was configured as follows:

* Line 1: Bergisel – Hungerburgbahn
* Line 3: Amras – City centre loop – Amras
* Line 3/1: Bergisel – Amras (during morning rush-hour, covering extra stops usually serviced only by Lines 1 and 6)
* Linie 6: Igls – Bergisel

The urban transport administrative offices at the Bergisel Station were considered badly outdated. For the 1976 Winter Olympics a nearby Press centre was built nearby, and the decision was taken to design and construct the press centre so that after the Olympics were over, the IVB (city transport administration) should take it over. In 1977, the IVB moved in, and some of the buildings at the Bergisel Station could be taken down.

1976 was also the year in which eight secondhand bi-directional powered tram cars were purchased from Hagen in northern Germany. This made it possible, in 1977, to retire the last of the timber-frame tramcars from the network. The only old-style tramcars remaining were two powered cars originally from Zürich, one unpowered-trailer-tram originally used on the nearby Merano mountain railway, which remained available for special duties including festive/Christmas work, two powered motor cars and eleven trailers on route 6.

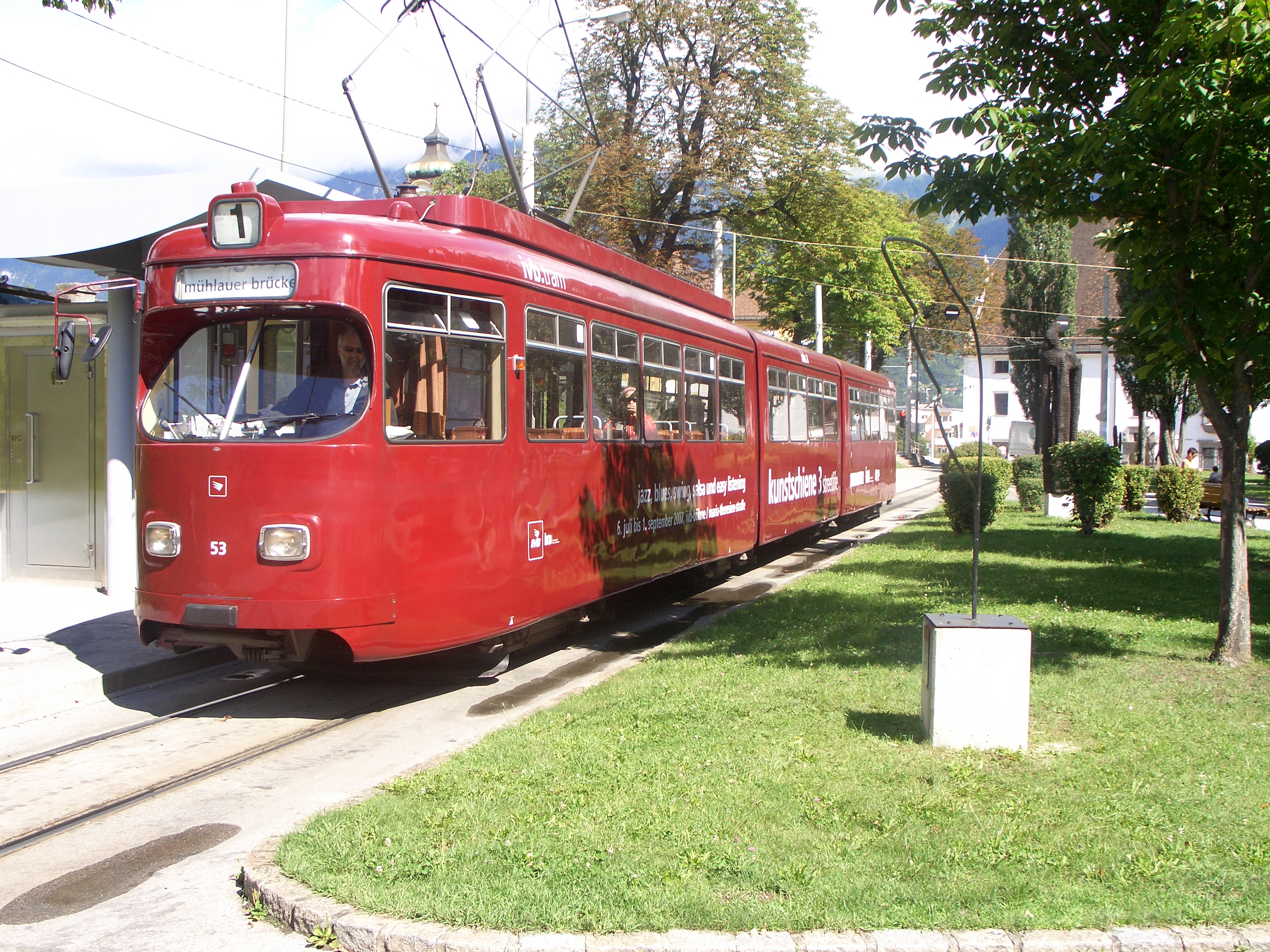
One of fourteen eight-axle articulated trams purchased second-hand from Bielefeld to replace the 1960-built bogie cars and prepare for future expansion of the system

By 1980, the launch of the city's Transport concept (Verkehrskonzept) signaled a realisation that oil prices could not be expected to return to 1960s levels: trams were no longer so readily to be written off as yesterday's solutions. There was talk of a new line for the Olympic Village and another for the Reichenau quarter. There was also a plan for reinstating Line 4 which had been replaced by a bus service in 1976 in response to the widening of the Haller Street. To service this expansion new six- and eight-axle articulated tramcars were purchased from Bielefeld, and a large new tram depot would be built.

In 1980, therefore, the transport authority decided to buy fourteen second-hand trams from Bielefeld, some for use on Line 6 and to support its extension to the Hungerburg funicular. In 1985 the line and its tram halts were modified for use with uni-directional trams (with passenger access possible from one side). Three of the trams bought from Bielefeld were modified for use on the service. Because of the lower passenger numbers on Line 6, this also now became the first Innsbruck tramline to be adapted for driver-only operation.

=== 1983–99: Modern times ===
In 1983, the cars bought from Hagen in 1976 were lengthened and adapted for use on the Stubai Valley Railway. The original ac powered trams were replaced by the Hagen trams on 2 July 1983. The Transport concept (Verkehrskonzept) was revised in 1986 following a decision by the city authorities to use trolleybuses rather than trams in the eastern part of the city. Several of the former Bielefeld trams were used to replace the short-bodied Lohner trams in 1989.

In 1995, after thirty years during which no new tramlines had actually been constructed in Innsbruck, there was a modest investment in new tracks. This involved returning a second track to the Museum Street section which again became a twin track line, and a loop round the market place. In 1996, Line 6 was threatened with closure not for the first time, but the financial support needed to keep it running was found following a deluge of signatures targeting the city authorities. In order to sustain passenger involvement at a time when nostalgia was becoming a mainstream marketing tool, two former powered cars that had operated on the line until 1981 were operated twice each day with trailers in tow.

Questions about the future for trams in Innsbruck returned at the end of the 1990s. Using three different types of vehicle for inner city mass transportation – trams, trolleybuses and motor buses – was seen as unnecessarily costly, and there was talk of abandonment: either the trolleybus system or the tram system. The discussions led to a new regional rail (1999) and trams (2001) strategy (Straßenbahnkonzept und Regionalbahnkonzept) which broadly favoured of the trams, however.

=== 1999–present: The regional strategy and low-floor trams ===
The decision of the city authorities, in 1999, to retain and expand the tram network triggered an ongoing programme of construction and renovation. This involved a certain amount of disruption during summer months because of extensive upgrades of track beds and tracks, involving much pouring of concrete. Part of the strategy called for wider tramcars: new trams would be 2.4 m (94 in) wide. Hitherto, tram widths in Innsbruck had been restricted to 2.2 m (87 in). While the track gauge was unaffected, the loading gauge was not, so that twin tracks had to be farther apart and greater clearance was needed for buildings and street furniture. This necessitated the largest re-laying of track since 1911. Some of the depots were also to be renewed, rescaled, and brought up to date.

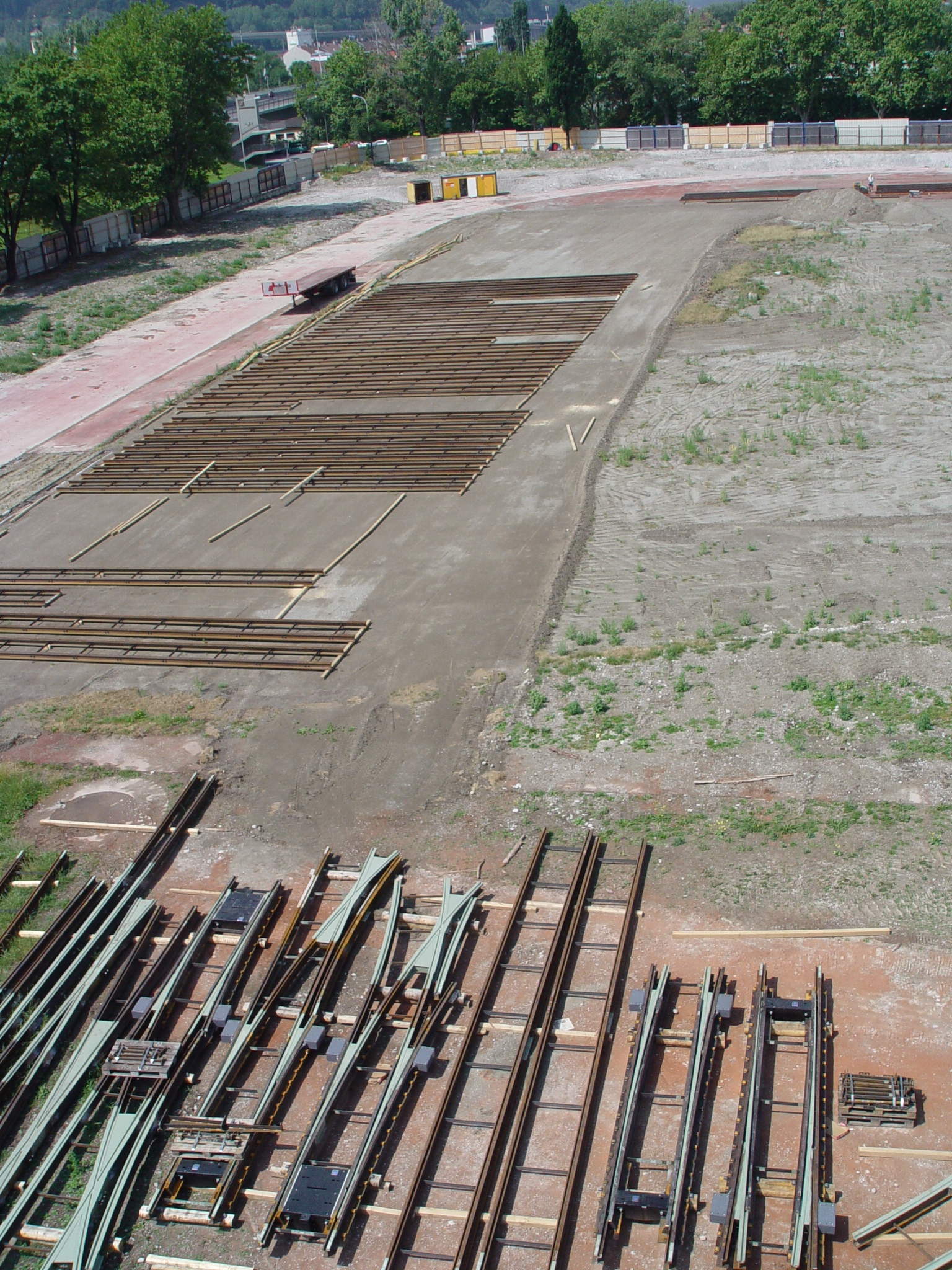
Preparing the ground for wider heavier trams at Innsbruck's former Tivoli Sports Stadium in 2005

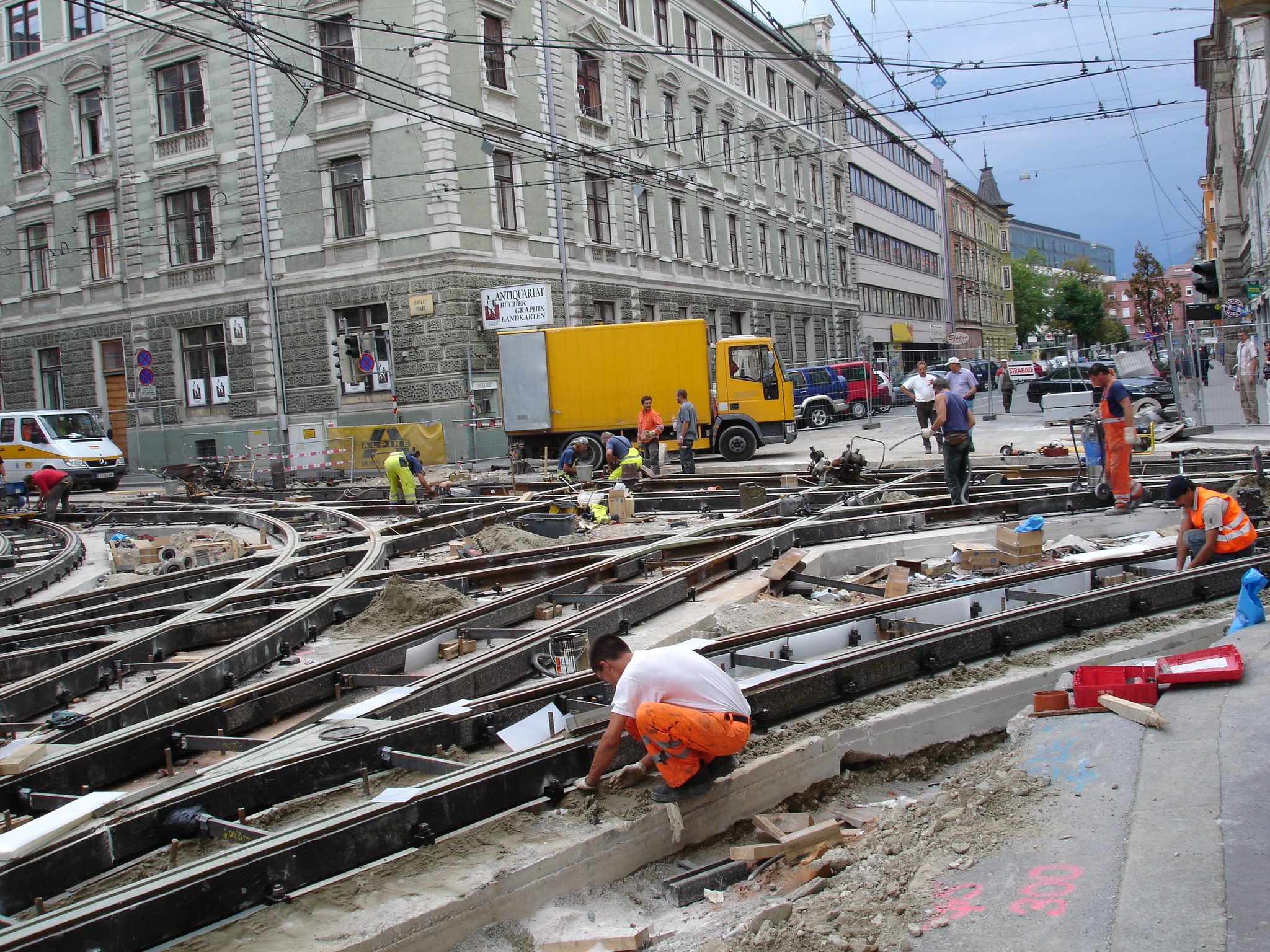
Preparing the crossroads of Anich Street and Bürger Street to accommodate lines of the regional mountain railway, in 2005

The new trams strategy was formally adopted by the Innsbruck City Council in September 2001. By 2004, the tram terminus in front of the main station had been reconstructed, with the terminus for the Stubai Valley Railway and other regional meter-gauge mountain railways. In 2005 a new workshop-tramcar and two new trailer trucks were acquired, removing dependency on the vehicles used for line construction work over almost a century. In 2005, work was completed on preparing the tracks in Andreas Hofer Street and Anich Street for the wider trams, and the first tram halts were adapted for use with low-floor trams so that, for the first time, passengers would be able to access new trams without having to negotiate one or more steps. At the end of 2005 Innsbruck ordered 22 new tram sets from Bombardier, who had taken over the city's Vienna-based tram supplier 35 years earlier. Further tram halt changes, manhole cover renewals and other track adaptions for increased axle weights followed during 2006. During 2007 nearly all the city trams were equipped with new radio control units. (Radio communication had previously depended on a system that used the overhead wires themselves). By 2007, almost all the tram halts had been adapted for use in combination with the new low-floor trams.

The first low-floor tram was delivered on 17 October 2007. A few weeks later services ceased on the stretch of line in the northern part of Maria-Theresia Street, one of the oldest continually operated stretches of line on the network. At the end of 2007 the authorities issued the final version of their plan for the reconstruction of the city and regional tram and rail networks, and this was agreed by the city council at the start of 2008. At the start of July 2008 the first old-style Innsbruck tramcar, Number 53, was taken away to Bielefeld During 2008/2009 a further eleven of the former Bielefeld tramcars found new work in Arad, Romania, while five of the tramcars previously acquired second-hand from Hagen now found their way to Łódź. After this, there remained in Innsbruck only four of the old DÜWAG articulated trams which had formed the backbone of the city fleet during the closing years of the 20th century.

The first of the low-floor Bombardier trams was certified on 11 March 2008 and entered service on Line 1 on 27 March 2008. Frequency on the Stubai Valley Railway was improved, with departures on the busy part of the line as far as Kreith every 30 minutes. Further service improvements and further retirements of the old stock followed, so that by July 2009 all the tramlines were operated exclusively by low-floor tramcars. At the same time the voltage was increased to 900 V. For Lines 1, 3 and 6 this involved replacing the transformers in all the sub-stations.

In 2010, work began on tackling further upgrades on the lines at the heart of the old network, with new tracks at the interchange area around Brunecker Street and Museum Street. Brunecker Street again received a second usable track. In 2012, steps were also taken to prepare Anich Street and along the Uni Bridge to strengthen the underpinnings for further track extensions, and steps were taken to adapt the 900 V electric power supply so that energy could be recovered during braking.

== Passenger numbers ==
Tram transport gained rapid acceptance in Innsbruck after 1905 and passenger growth was strong, requiring investment in additional new tramcars. The positive trends continued till the outbreak of the First World War.

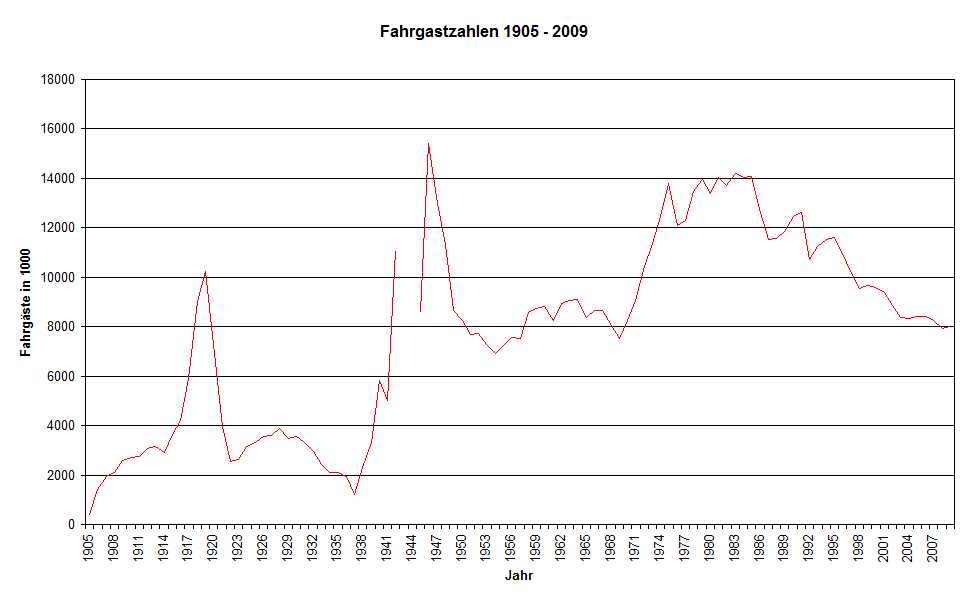
Innsbruck tram passenger numbers, by year, 1905-2009

Staff shortages were caused by personnel being called up for military service in 1914, which enforced an initial falling off in tram use, but once new staff, including women, had been recruited the staffing issue was addressed, while increasingly inventive solutions were found for the shortages of replacement parts caused by the military redeployment of heavy industry. By the end of the war, in 1918, passenger numbers had more than doubled when set against their pre-war peak.

After the war there was no longer massive tram-use in connection with transporting wounded soldiers back from the front line and overall tram usage fell back, but through the 1920s and 1930 the trams were nevertheless the heart of Innsbruck's transport provision, although during the middle part of the 1920s motor bus operators appeared on the scene, and started to undercut the trams on price. During the middle 1930s passenger numbers sank in response to the reduced living standards and incomes that followed the economic crash at the start of the decade. Following the union with Germany early in 1938 prosperity returned, however, and passenger numbers recovered to pre-crisis levels.

Innsbruck became popular as a tourist destination, and nearby health resorts such as Igls and Solbad Hall boomed. In 1940, it was necessary to order a new batch of tramcars. However, war had resumed the previous year: wartime materials shortages meant that the trams ordered in 1940 could not be delivered. Nevertheless, the early years of the war saw a rapid increase in tram use. During the final years of the war air raids and the deteriorating availability of replacement parts caused cut-backs, and passenger numbers probably declined, but data for 1944 and 1945 has not been accessed.

After the war tram use fell back. During the 1950s and 1960s there was a massive surge in private car ownership, and with almost all of the city's tramcars fifty or more years old it was hard to attract investment in the network. Higher oil prices and growing city centre traffic congestion changed minds in the 1970s, and the major modernisation programme launched at the time of the 1976 Winter Olympics triggered a sustained increase in passenger numbers during the 1970s, which then reached a plateau in the early 1980s.
