= Balthasar Ferdinand Moll =

Austrian sculptor (1717–1785)

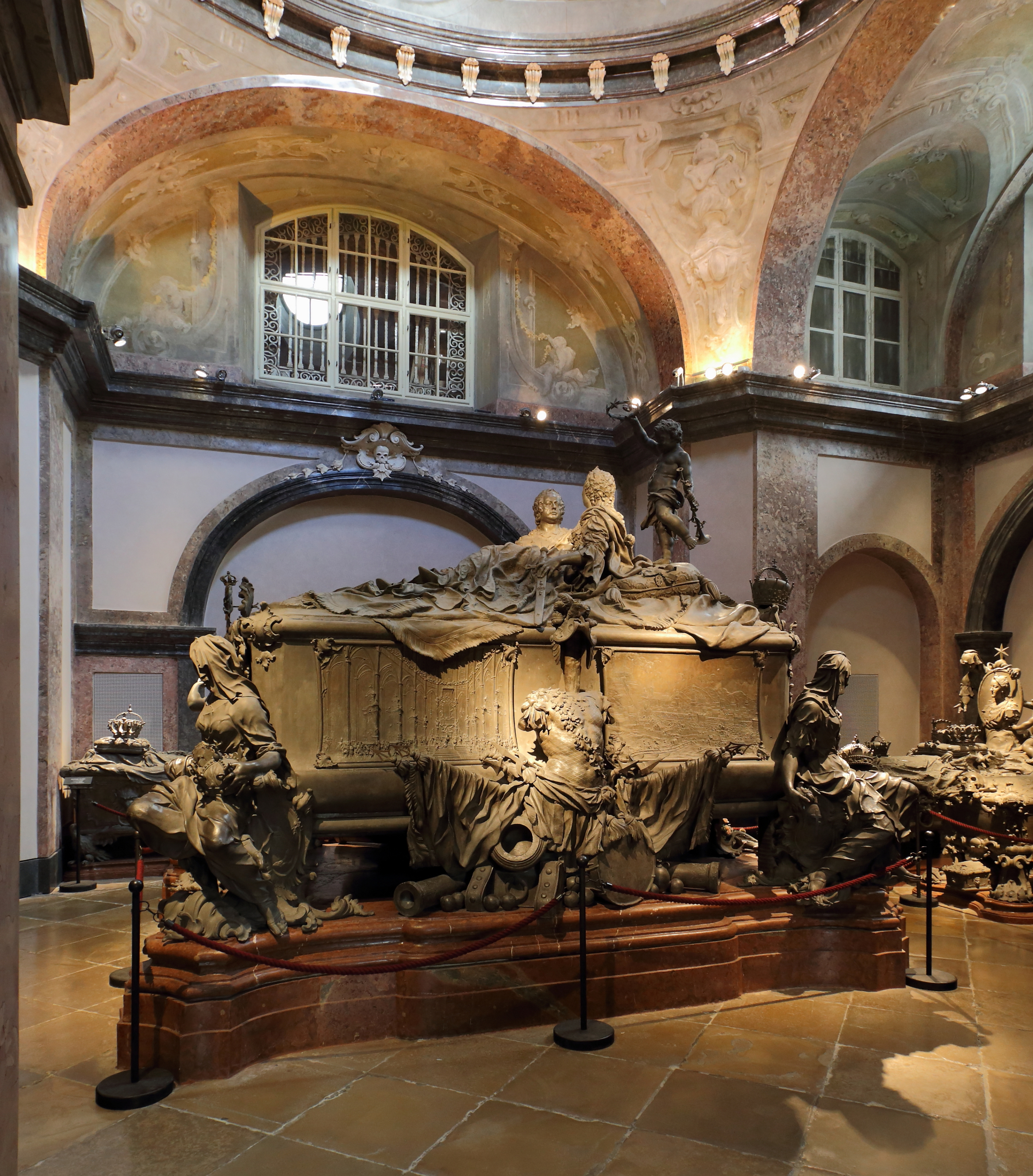
Sarcophagus of Empress Maria Theresia and Emperor Franz I Stephan

Balthasar Ferdinand Moll (Innsbruck, Tirol 4 January 1717 – Vienna 3 March 1785) was an Austrian sculptor.

== Biography ==
He came from a Tyrolean family of sculptors. His first training was from his father Nikolaus Moll. He went to the Vienna Academy in 1738, but his artistic inheritance is really from the great Viennese sculptor Georg Raphael Donner (1693–1741). He taught at the Vienna Academy from 1751 to 1754. One of his pupils at the Vienna Academy was Franz Xaver Messerschmidt (1736–1783). His later work possesses classical character.

In 1739, he decorated the pulpit of the Church of the Servites in Vienna with monumental figures, representing the virtues of Faith, Love and Hope. The statuettes in walnut and stained ivory, now on display in the Metropolitan Museum in New York, served as model for the pulpit, and show already his virtuosity. He made a funeral monument for general count Leopold Daun (died 1766) at the wall of the George chapel in the Augustinian church in Vienna.

He was used initially at the Viennese court for the design and manufacture of floats and showy sledges. He was soon to become the leading sculptor in the Late Baroque art of courtly representation.

His work in Vienna includes about twenty tombs of the Habsburg imperial family in the Imperial Crypt, especially his masterpiece, the elaborate double sarcophagus in Rococo style of Empress Maria Theresa and her husband Emperor Franz I Stephan on which Moll worked from 1751 to 1772. The life-size imperial pair lie on the tin lid, awakened from their sleep of death by the Trumps of Doom. The two look at each other while a putto behind them holds a garland of stars above them. The reliefs on the sides of the sarcophagus depict important scenes of their lives : the ceremonial entrance in Florence as archduke of Tuscany, his coronation in Frankfurt am Main, his coronation in Prague as King of Bohemia, and Maria Theresa's coronation ceremony in Pressburg as Queen of Hungary. Of the four corners of the sarcophagus, grieving statues show the crowns and blasons of their most important titles : Holy Roman Empire, Hungary, Bohemia and Jerusalem.

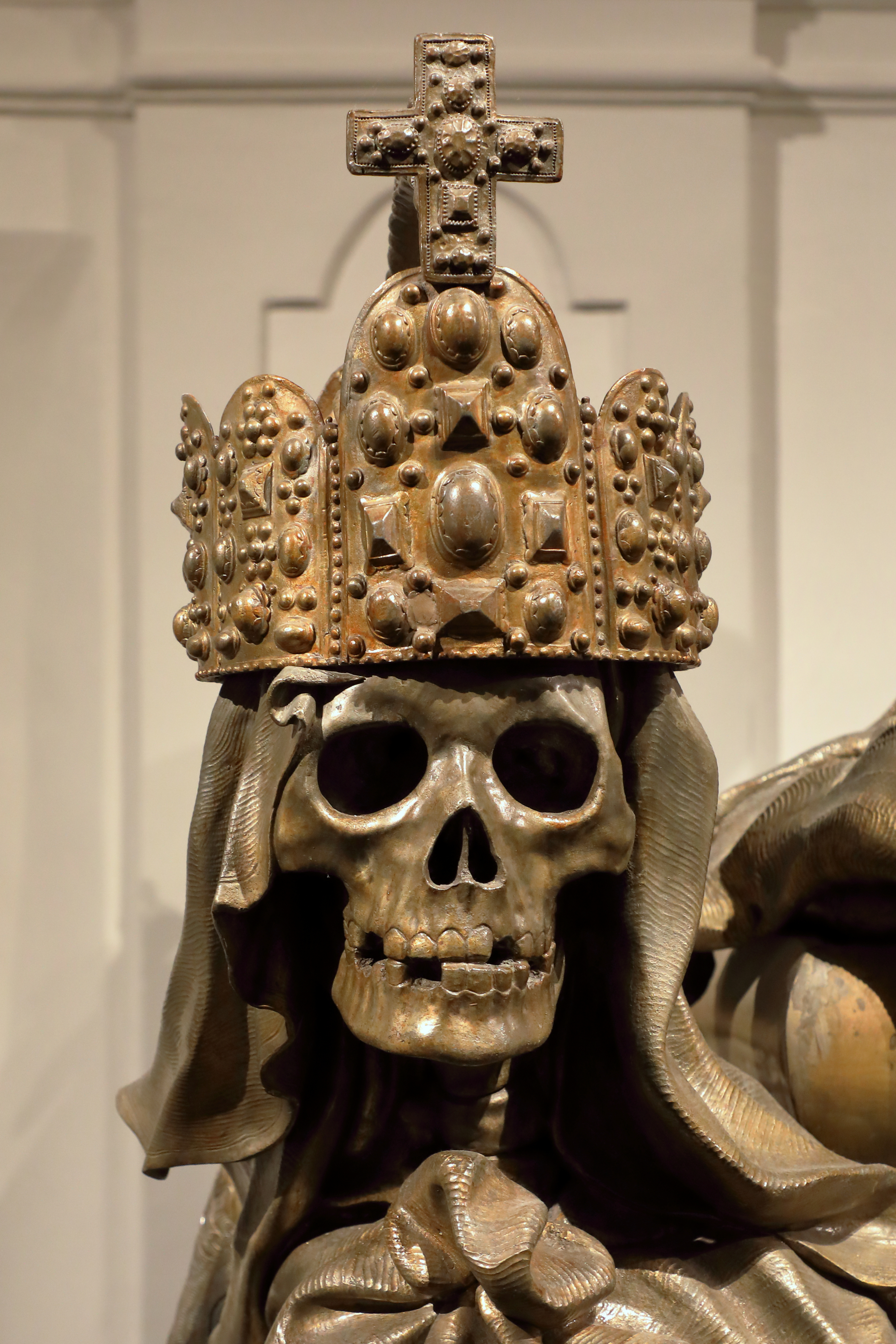
Sarcophagus of emperor Karl VI (detail with the Imperial Crown of the Holy Roman Empire)

He also worked on the sarcophagi of emperor Karl VI (with the famous skull with the crown of the Holy Roman Empire), his wife the empress Elisabeth Christine, and emperor Joseph I.

He decorated numerous Austrian churches, palaces and castles with statues, bas-reliefs and crucifixes. He also participated at the decoration with statues of the Triumphal Arch for Emperor Leopold II at Innsbruck.

He produced the 1781 equestrian statues of that emperor Franz II that stands in the Burggarten and of field marshal Joseph Wenzel Fürst Liechtenstein. The marble statue of emperor Franz Stephan von Lotharingen in the Belvedere is also attributed to him. He is also the sculptor of some gravestones in the Stephansdom cathedral.
