= Triumphal Arch, Innsbruck =

Austrian triumphal arch

Coordinates: 47°15′45″N 11°23′41″E

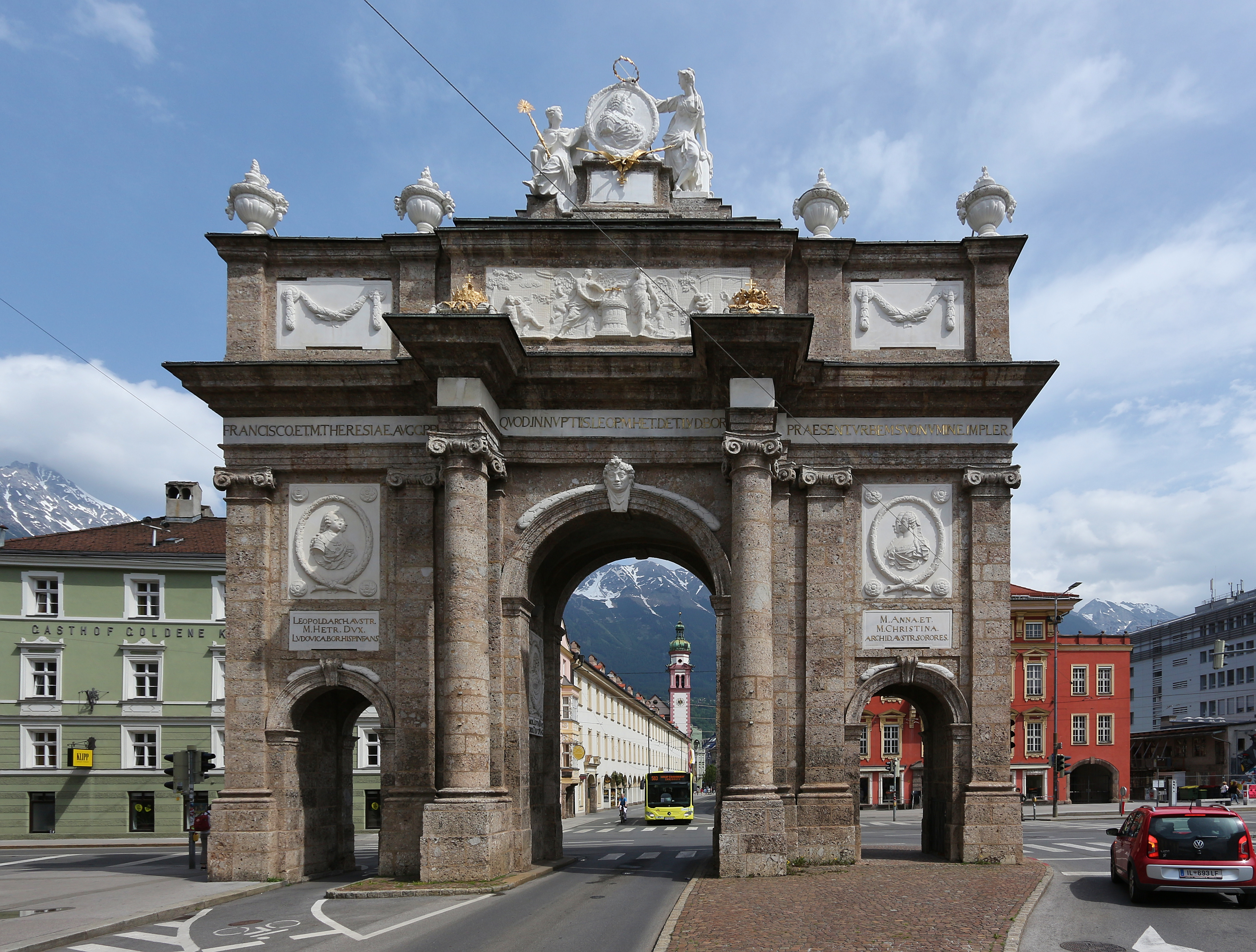
Triumphal Arch from the south

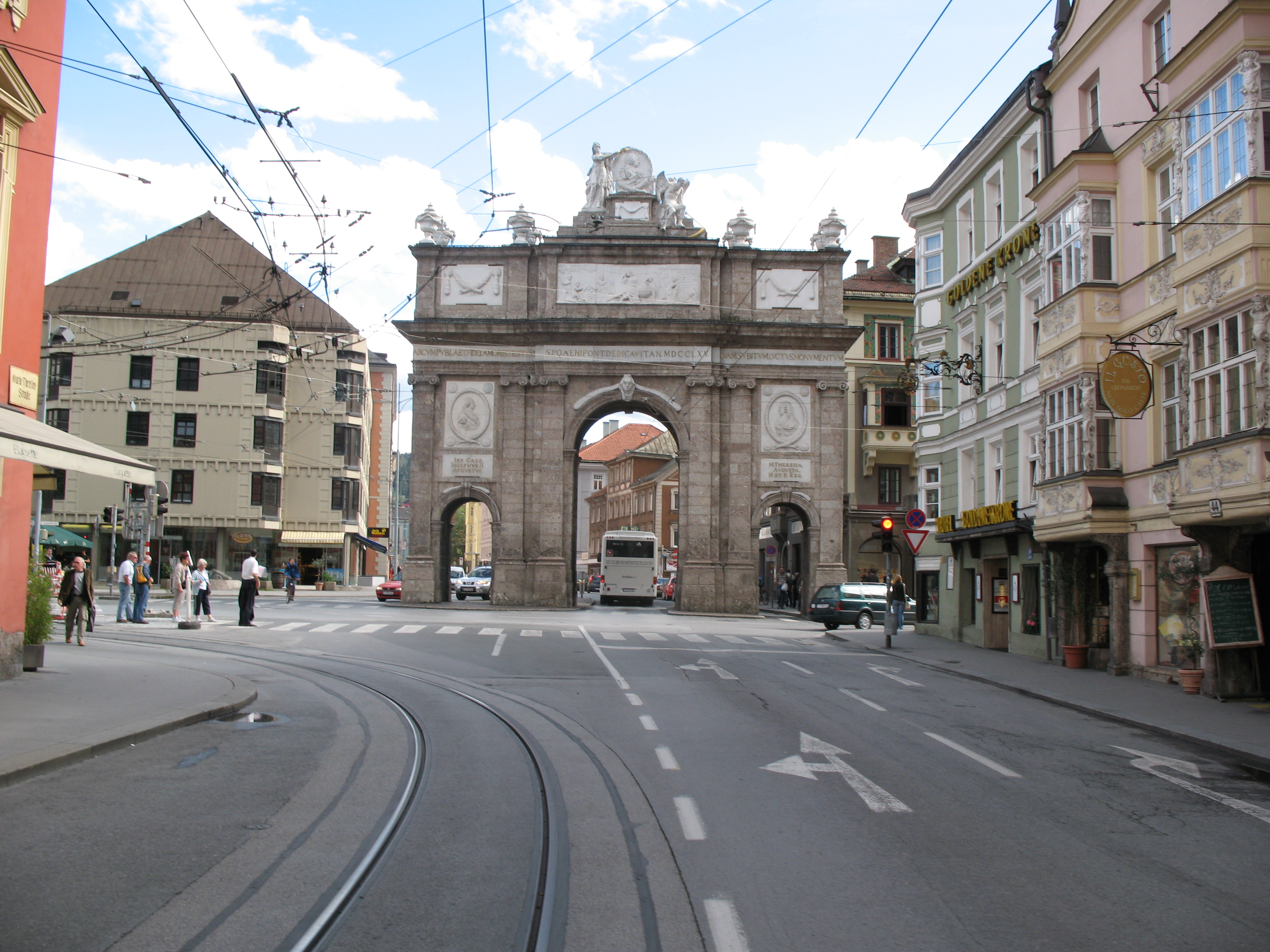
Triumphal Arch from the north

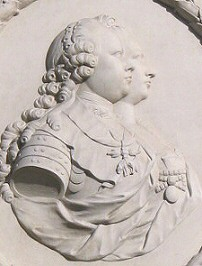
The wedding couple

The Triumphal Arch (German: Triumphpforte) is one of the best known sights in the Austrian city of Innsbruck. It is located at the southern end of the present Maria-Theresien-Straße, once the southern road out of the city.

== History ==
This triumphal arch was built in 1765 on the occasion of the wedding of Archduke Leopold, the second son of Empress Maria Theresa and Francis Stephen of Lorraine, to the Spanish princess, Maria Luisa, on 5 August 1765. Because Leopold’s father, Francis Stephen, died unexpectedly shortly after the wedding on 18 August 1765, a memorial motif was worked into the Triumphal Arch when he died. Its south side portrays motifs of the wedding of the young couple; its north side commemorates the death of the emperor.

In Innsbruck, contrary to normal practice, it was decided to build the Triumphal Arch from stone rather than wood. So ashlars of Höttinger Breccia, which originated from the demolished outer city gate at the exit of the old town into today's Maria-Theresien-Straße, were reused. The work was carried out by Constantin Walter and Johann Baptist Hagenauer. In 1774, the reliefs made out by Hagenauer in stucco were worked by Balthasar Ferdinand Moll in Sterzing into marble.

== Architecture ==
The relief ornamentation depicts the state symbols of the Habsburg monarchy as well as people and events:

- The Austrian archducal hat with the Order of the Golden Fleece
- The Bohemian Wencelas crown with the Hungarian Order of St. Stephen, patronised by Maria
- A portrayal of Empress Maria Theresa and Francis Stephen wearing a laurel wreath and portrait medallions of the couple
- A profile portrait of the wedding couple, Archduke Leopold and Princess Maria Luisa
- Portraits of Duchess Caroline of Lorraine and Duke Charles of Lorraine, cousins of the Emperor

== Gallery ==
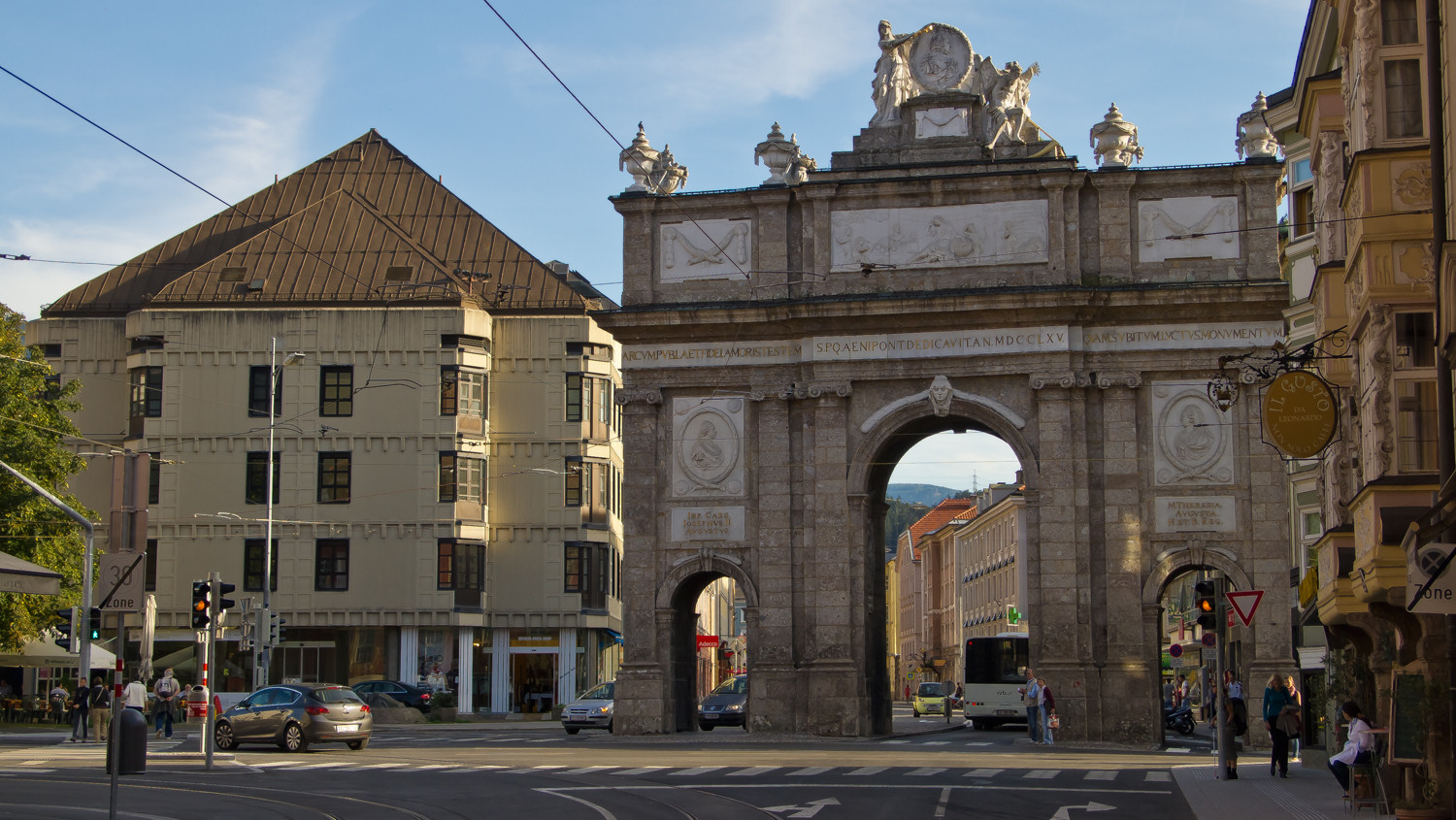

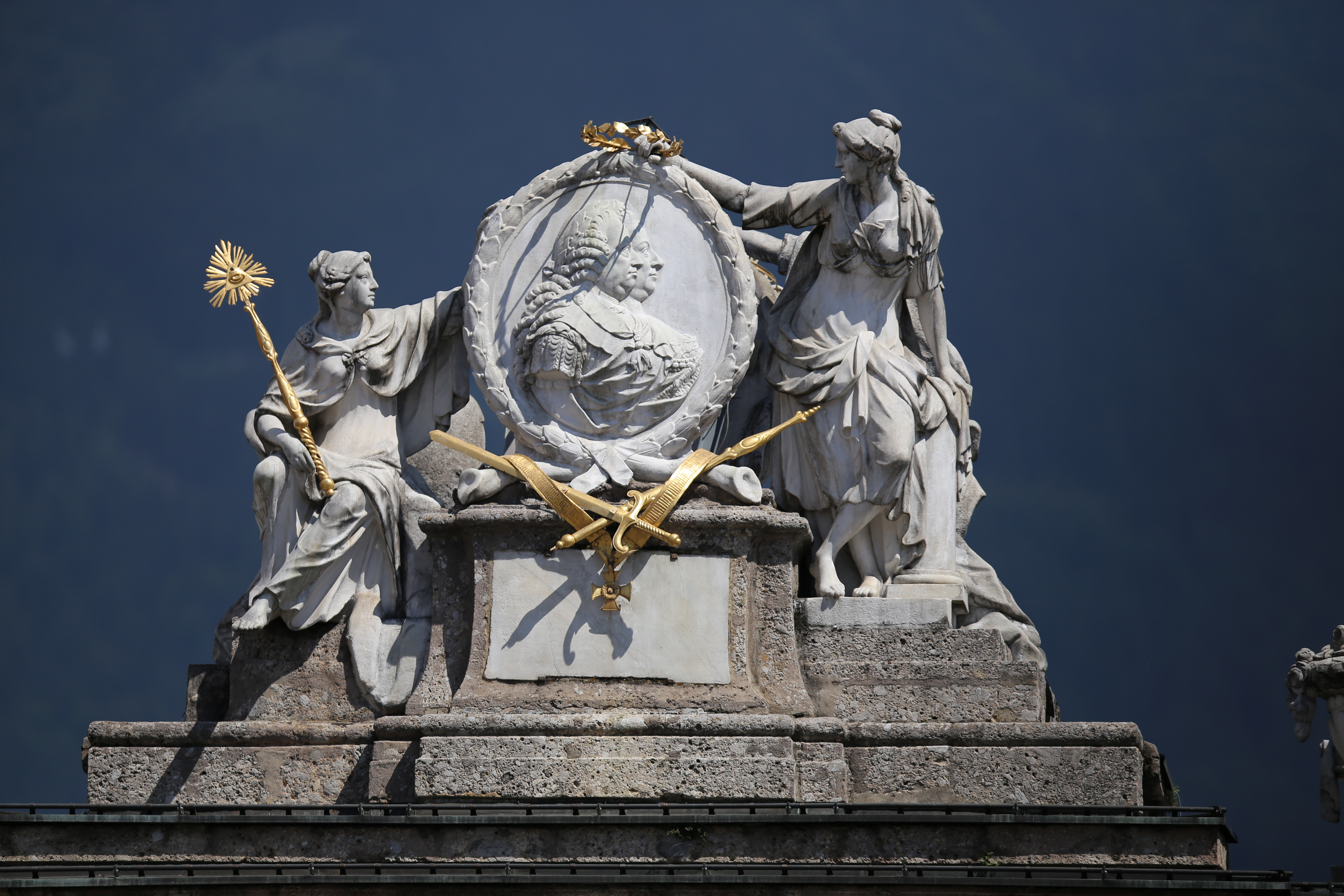

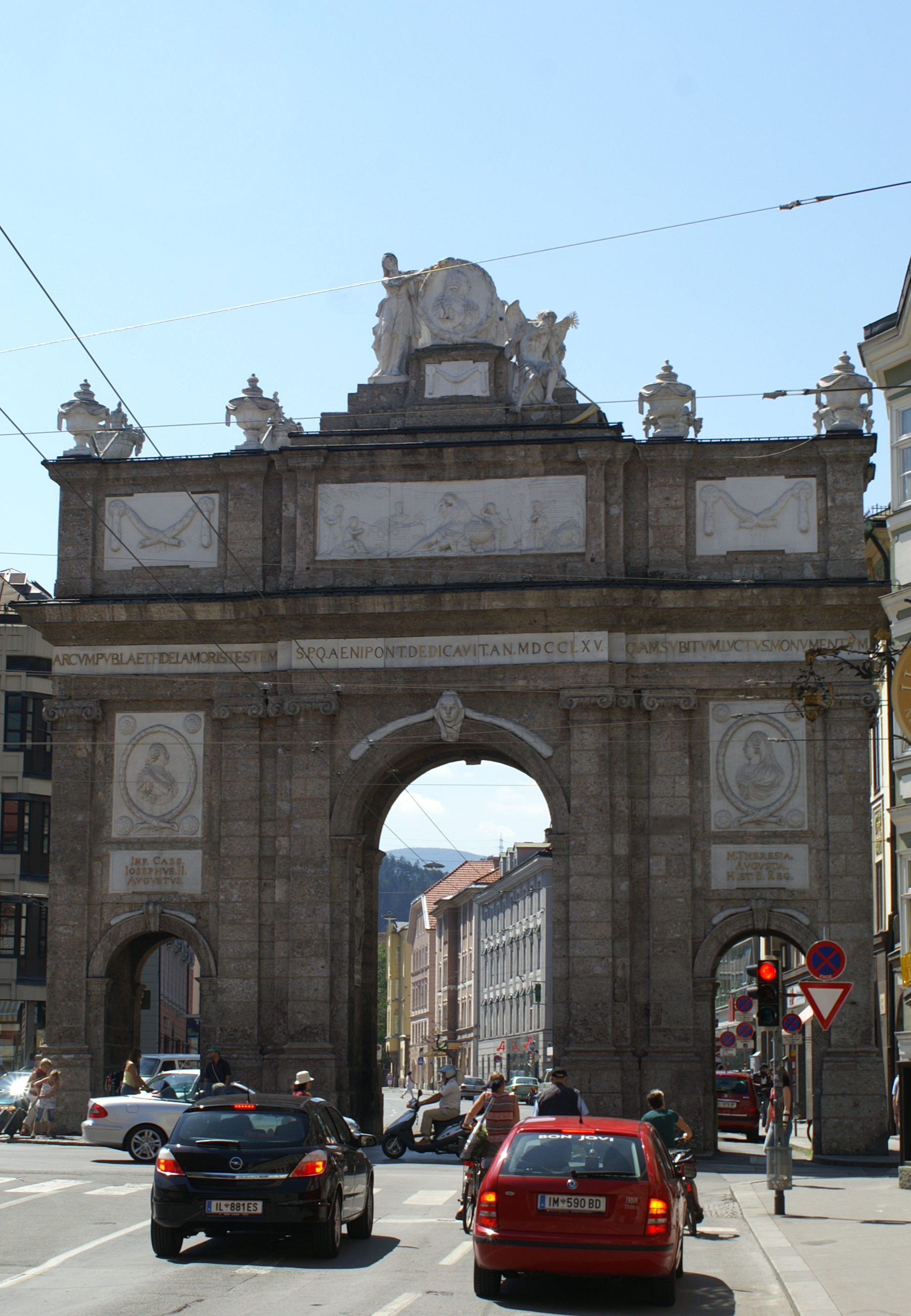

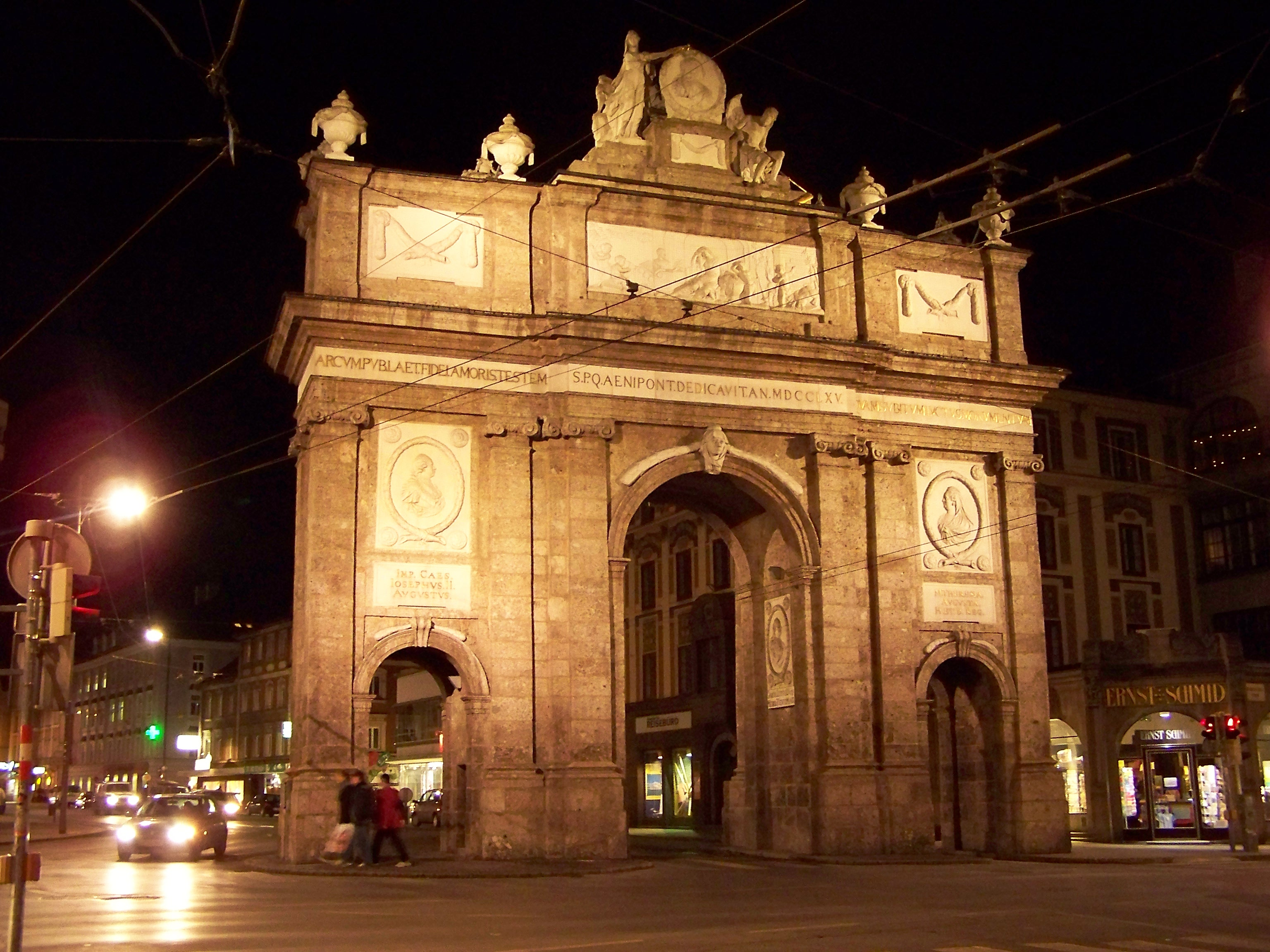

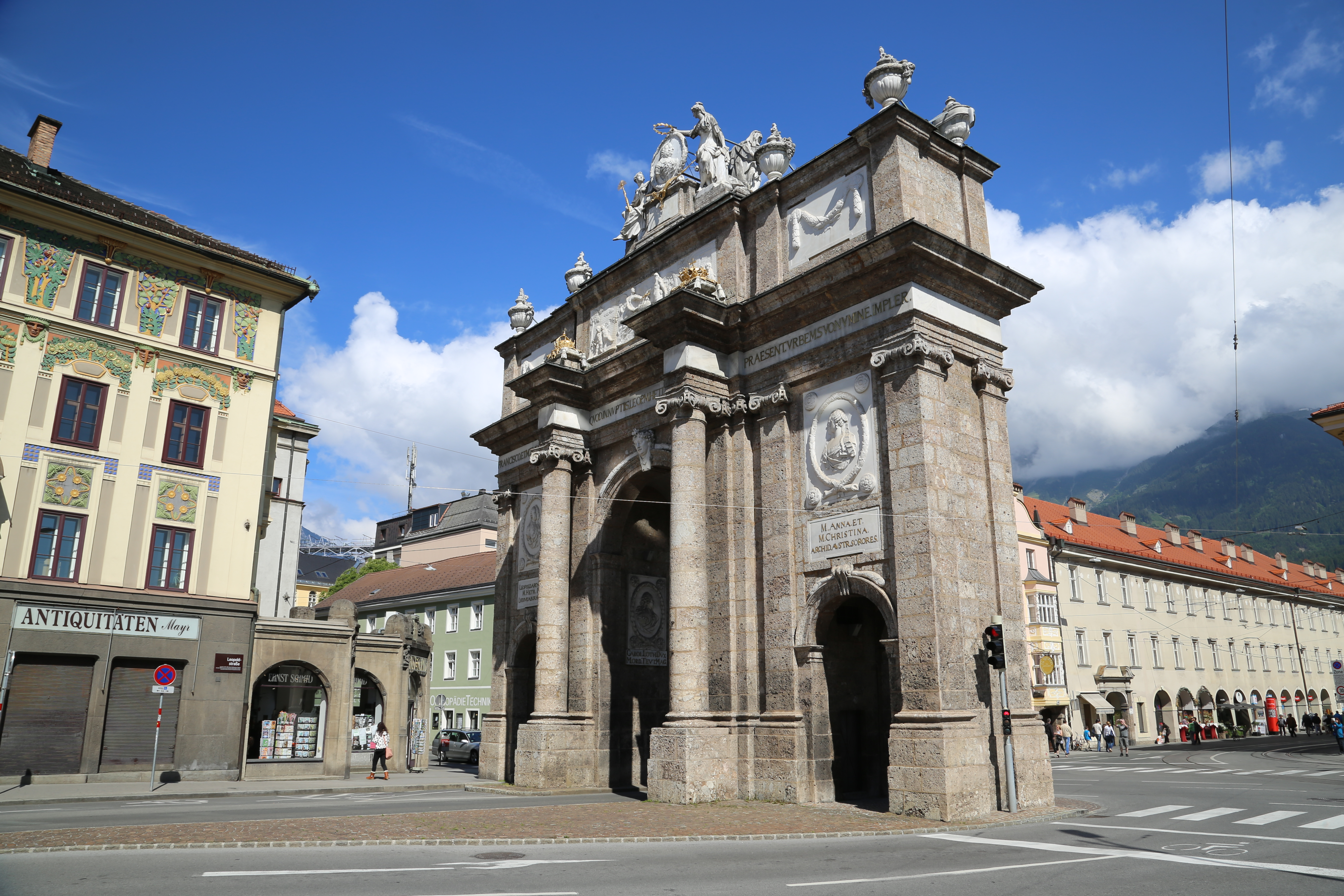
