= List of rivers of Austria =

Drainage basins of Austria: Rhine Danube Elbe

The rivers (or tributaries thereof) listed here are those at least partially located in Austria. Nearly all of Austria is drained by the Danube into the Black Sea; the remaining rivers flow into the North Sea. Each river is listed twice: first by basin, then alphabetically.

Within basins, rivers that flow into the sea are listed alphabetically. Rivers that flow into other rivers are sorted by the proximity of their points of confluence to the sea (the lower in the list, the more upstream). Rivers which themselves do not flow through Austria, but have tributaries that do so (e.g. Vltava) are listed in italics. The Austrian namens are given in brackets, (e.g. Rhine (Rhein)).

== By basin ==
=== Draining into the Black Sea ===
- Danube (Donau) (in Sulina, Romania)
  - Drava (Drau) (near Osijek, Croatia)
    - Mur (near Legrad, Croatia)
      - Ledava (near Muraszemenye, Hungary)
      - Sulm (south of Leibnitz, between Retznei and Obervogau)
      - Kainach (in Wildon)
      - Mürz (in Bruck an der Mur)
    - Pesnica (Pößnitz) (near Ormož, Slovenia)
    - Meža (Mieß) (near Dravograd, Slovenia)
    - Lavant (at Lavamünd)
    - Gurk (near Völkermarkt)
      - Glan (near Klagenfurt)
        - Glanfurt (near Ebenthal)
      - Metnitz (near Althofen)
    - Gail (in Villach)
      - Gailitz (at Arnoldstein)
    - Möll (near Möllbrücke)
    - Gailbach (at Strassen)
  - Rába (Raab) (near Győr, Hungary)
    - Pinka (in Körmend, Hungary)
    - Lafnitz (in Szentgotthárd, Hungary)
    - Rabnitzbach (in Gleisdorf)
  - Rabnitz (near Győr, Hungary)
    - Einserkanal (near Rábcakapi, Hungary)
      - Wulka (into Lake Neusiedl)
  - Leitha (near Mosonmagyaróvár, Hungary)
    - Schwarza (converging at Haderswörth in the parish of Lanzenkirchen)
    - Pitten (converging at Haderswörth in the parish of Lanzenkirchen)
  - Morava (March) (in Bratislava-Devin, Slovakia)
    - Thaya (near Hohenau)
      - German Thaya (Deutsche Thaya) (converging at Raabs an der Thaya)
      - Moravian Thaya (Mährische Thaya) (converging at Raabs an der Thaya)
  - Fischa (in Fischamend)
    - Piesting (in Gramatneusiedl)
      - Myrabach (in Pernitz)
  - Schwechat or Schwachat (at Schwechat)
    - Triesting (at Achau)
    - Liesing
  - Wien (in Vienna)
  - Krottenbach (into Vienna's severage)
    - Arbesbach (in Vienna)
  - Gießgraben (into an old branch of the Danube near Utzenlaa, Königsbrunn am Wagram)
  - Traisen (in Grafenwörth)
    - Gölsen (in Traisen)
  - Krems (Lower Austria) (in Grafenwörth)
    - Kamp (in Grafenwörth)
  - Erlauf (in Pöchlarn)
  - Ybbs (in Ybbs an der Donau)
  - Gießenbach (between Grein and Sankt Nikola an der Donau)
  - Aist (between Mauthausen and Au an der Donau, Naarn im Machlande)
  - Enns (in Enns)
    - Steyr (in Steyr)
    - Erzbach (in Hieflau)
    - Salza (in Großreifling, Landl)
    - Northern Taurach (near Radstadt)
  - Gusen (at Langenstein)
  - Traun (in Linz)
    - Krems (Upper Austria) (in Traun)
    - Alm (near Lambach)
      - Laudach (north of Vorchdorf)
    - Ager (in Lambach)
      - Aurach (at Wankham)
      - Vöckla (at Vöcklabruck)
        - Dürre Ager (at Timelkam, Vöcklabruck)
      - Fornacher Redlbach (west of Vöcklamarkt)
      - Seeache (into the Attersee that is drained by the Ager)
        - Zeller Ache (into the Mondsee which is drained by the Seeache)
          - Zeller Bach (into the Irrsee which is drained by the Zeller Ache)
  - Innbach (in Wilhering)
    - Aschach (near Alkoven)
  - Ranna (in Rannamühl (Pfarrkirchen im Mühlkreis))
  - Inn (in Passau, Germany)
    - Lindenbach (at Wernstein am Inn)
    - Antiesen (near Antiesenhofen)
      - Oberach (near Ried im Innkreis)
    - Hartbach (east of Obernberg am Inn)
    - Salzach (in Haiming, Germany)
      - Saalach (in Freilassing, Germany)
        - Grabenbach (at Bad Reichenhall, Germany)
          - Weißbach (at Bad Reichenhall, Germany)
        - Steinbach (between Schneizlreuth, Germany, and Unken)
        - Leoganger Ache (northwest of Saalfelden)
      - Fischach (near Bergheim)
      - Klausbach (in Elsbethen)
      - Berchtesgadener Ache (near Anif)
      - Almbach (in Hallein)
        - Taugl (into the lake Hintersee)
      - Lammer (at Golling an der Salzach)
      - Fuscher Ache (at Bruck an der Großglocknerstraße)
      - Krimmler Ache (in Vorderkrimml, Wald im Pinzgau)
    - Alz (in Marktl, Germany)
      - Traun (near Altenmarkt an der Alz, Germany)
        - Weiße Traun (confluence with the Rote Traun near Siegsdorf, Germany)
          - Fischbach (Weiße Traun) (confluence with the Seetraun near Ruhpolding, Germany)
      - Chiemsee (in Seebruck, Germany)
        - Tiroler Achen (in Grabenstätt, Germany)
          - Großache (in St. Johann in Tirol)
            - Schwarzlofer (near Kössen)
            - Brunnbach (between Kössen and Kirchdorf in Tirol)
    - Kieferbach (near Kiefersfelden, Germany)
    - Kaiserbach (in Kufstein)
    - Weißache (in Kufstein)
    - Brixentaler Ache (near Wörgl)
      - Kelchsauer Ache (in Hopfgarten)
      - Windauer Ache (in Hopfgarten)
    - Brandenberger Ache (in Rattenberg)
    - Ziller (in Münster)
    - Vomperbach (between Vomp and Terfens)
    - Wattenbach (near Wattens)
      - Mölsbach (confluence with the Lizumbach)
      - Lizumbach (confluence with the Mölsbach)
    - Fallbach (Inn, Baumkirchen) (at Baumkirchen)
    - Weißenbach (at Mils)
    - Lanser Bach (in Innsbruck)
      - Aldranser Bach (in Innsbruck)
      - Sistranser Bach (in Innsbruck)
    - Sill (in Innsbruck)
      - Ruetz (near the Europa Bridge)
      - Viggarbach (near Schönberg)
      - Navisbach (north of Steinach am Brenner)
      - Gschnitzbach (at Steinach am Brenner)
      - Obernberger Seebach (at Gries am Brenner)
    - Mühlauer Bach (in Mühlau, a district of Innsbruck)
    - Tuffbach (in Innsbruck)
    - Weiherburgbach (in Innsbruck)
    - Fallbach (Inn, Innsbruck) (in Innsbruck)
    - Höttinger Bach (in Innsbruck)
    - Lohbach (in Innsbruck)
    - Geroldsbach (in the district Sieglanger of Innsbruck)
    - Melach (between Unterperfuss and Kematen in Tirol)
      - Fotscherbach (in Sellrain)
    - Schlossbach (in Zirl)
    - Ötztaler Ache (east of Imst)
    - Pitze (near Imst)
    - Gurglbach (near Imst)
    - Sanna (at Landeck)
  - Isar (near Deggendorf, Germany)
    - Ammer (in Moosburg, Germany)
      - Linder (near Oberammergau, Germany)
        - Fischbach (Linder) (confluence with the Neualmbach between Oberammergau, Germany and Reutte)
        - Neualmbach, also called Neualpbach (confluence with the Fischbach between Oberammergau, Germany and Reutte)
    - Loisach (in Wolfratshausen, Germany)
    - Rißbach (in Vorderriß, Lenggries, Germany)
    - Leutascher Ache (near Mittenwald, Germany)
    - Gleirschbach (at the exit of the Hinterau valley)
  - Lech (near Donauwörth, Germany)
    - Vils (near Füssen, Germany)
    - Archbach (in Pflach)
  - Iller (in Ulm, Germany)
    - Breitach (near Oberstdorf, Germany)

=== Draining into the North Sea ===
- Elbe (near Cuxhaven, Germany)
  - Vltava (Moldau) (in Mělník, Czech Republic)
    - Lužnice (Lainsitz) (in Týn nad Vltavou, Czech Republic)
    - Malše (Maltsch) (in České Budějovice, Czech Republic)
- Rhine (Rhein) (main branch at Hook of Holland, Netherlands)
  - Lake Constance (Bodensee)
    - Leiblach (into Upper Lake Constance between Lindau, Germany, and Lochau)
    - Bregenzer Ach (into Upper Lake Constance in Bregenz)
      - Weißach (near Doren)
        - Bolgenach (at Krumbach)
          - Leckner Ach (east of Hittisau)
      - Subersach (below Egg)
    - Dornbirner Ach (into Upper Lake Constance near Bregenz)
  - Alpine Rhine
    - Frutz (at Koblach)
    - Ill (near Feldkirch)
      - Samina (at Frastanz)
      - Galina (between Frastanz and Feldkirch)
      - Meng (at Nenzing)
        - Gampbach (near Nenzing)
      - Alvier (at Bürs)
      - Alfenz (east of Bludenz)
      - Litz (in Schruns)
        - Gaflunerbach

== Alphabetical list ==
=== A–E ===
- Ager
- Aist
- Aldranser Bach
- Alfenz
- Alm
- Almbach
- Alpine Rhine
- Alvier
- Antiesen
- Arbesbach
- Archbach
- Aschach
- Aurach
- Berchtesgadener Ache
- Bolgenach
- Brandenberger Ache
- Bregenzer Ach
- Breitach
- Brixentaler Ache
- Brunnbach
- Danube
- Dornbirner Ach
- Drava
- Dürre Ager
- Enns
- Erlauf
- Erzbach

=== F–K ===
- Fallbach (Inn, Innsbruck)
- Fallbach (Inn, Baumkirchen)
- Fischa
- Fischach
- Fischbach (Linder)
- Fischbach (Weiße Traun)
- Fornacher Redlbach
- Fotscherbach
- Frutz
- Fuscher Ache
- Gaflunerbach
- Gail
- Gailbach
- Gailitz
- Galina
- Gampbach
- German Thaya
- Geroldsbach
- Gießenbach
- Gießgraben
- Glan
- Glanfurt
- Gleirschbach
- Gölsen
- Großache
- Gschnitzbach
- Gurglbach
- Gurk
- Gusen
- Hartbach
- Höttinger Bach
- Ill
- Inn
- Innbach
- Isar
- Kainach
- Kaiserbach
- Kamp
- Kelchsauer Ache
- Kieferbach
- Kitzbühler Ache
- Klausbach
- Krems (Lower Austria)
- Krems (Upper Austria)
- Krimmler Ache
- Krottenbach

=== L–O ===
- Lafnitz
- Lammer
- Lanser Bach
- Laudach
- Lavant
- Lech
- Leckner Ach
- Ledava
- Leiblach
- Leitha
- Leoganger Ache
- Leutascher Ache
- Lindenbach
- Litz
- Lizumbach
- Lohbach
- Loisach
- Lužnice
- Malše
- Melach
- Meng
- Metnitz
- Mieß
- Möll
- Mölsbach
- Morava
- Moravian Thaya
- Mühlauer Bach
- Mur
- Mürz
- Myrabach
- Navisbach
- Neualmbach (Neualpbach)
- Northern Taurach
- Oberach
- Obernberger Seebach
- Ötztaler Ache

=== P–S ===
- Pesnica
- Piesting
- Pinka
- Pitten
- Pitze
- Rába
- Rabnitzbach
- Ranna
- Rhine
- Rißbach
- Ruetz
- Saalach
- Salza
- Salzach
- Samina
- Sanna
- Schlossbach
- Schwarza
- Schwarzlofer
- Schwechat
- Seeache
- Sill
- Sistranser Bach
- Steinbach
- Steyr
- Subersach
- Sulm

=== T–Z ===
- Taugl
- Thaya
- Tiroler Achen
- Traisen
- Traun
- Triesting
- Tuffbach
- Viggarbach
- Vils
- Vöckla
- Vomperbach
- Wattenbach
- Weiherburgbach
- Weißach
- Weißache
- Weißbach
- Weißenbach
- Wien
- Windauer Ache
- Wulka
- Ybbs
- Zeller Ache
- Zeller Bach
- Ziller

== See also ==
- Geography of Austria
  - List of lakes of Austria
- Rivers of Europe
- Valleys of the Alps
