= Ranna (Danube) =

River in Germany and Austria

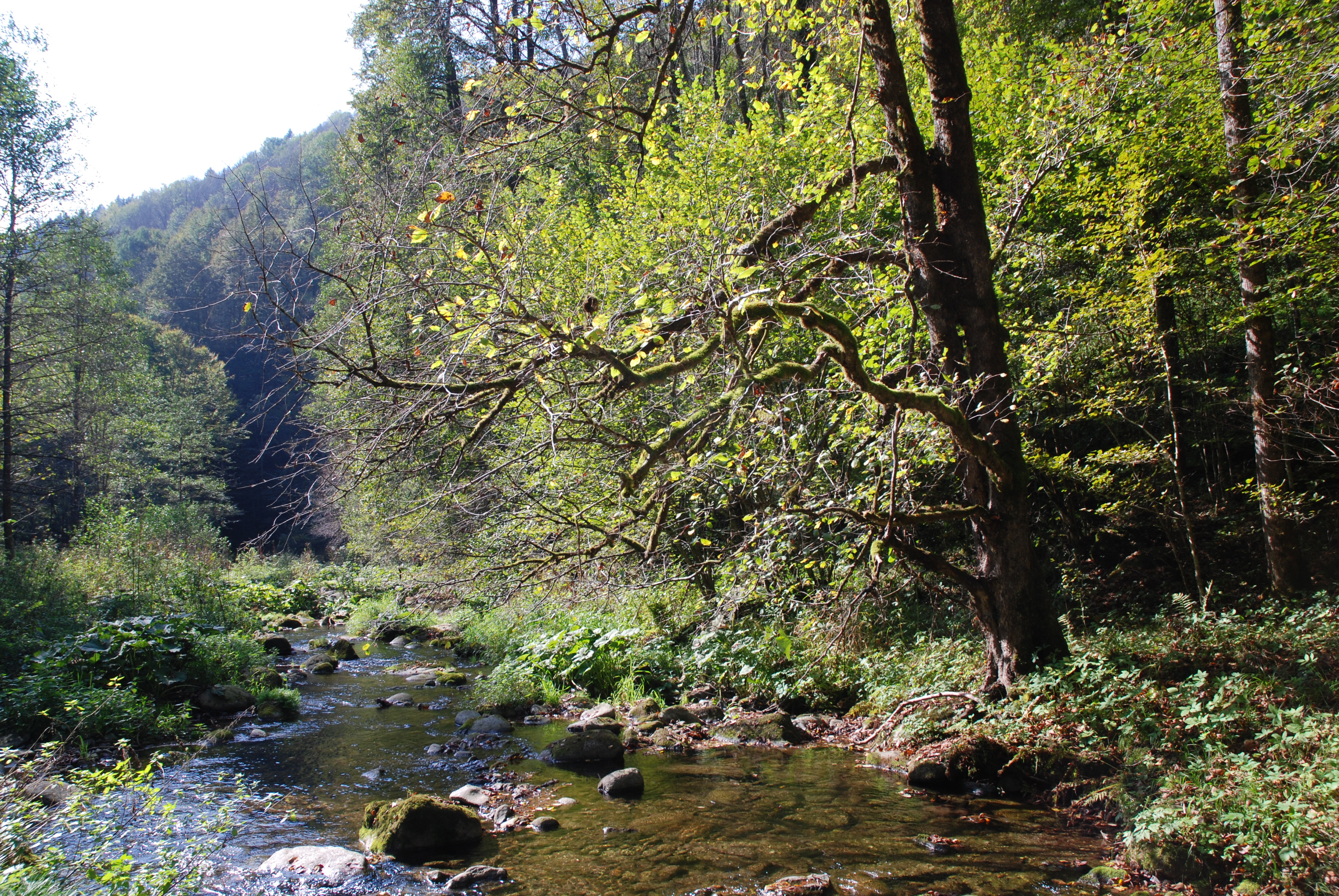
- The lower reaches of the Ranna in the Ranna Valley Nature Reserve

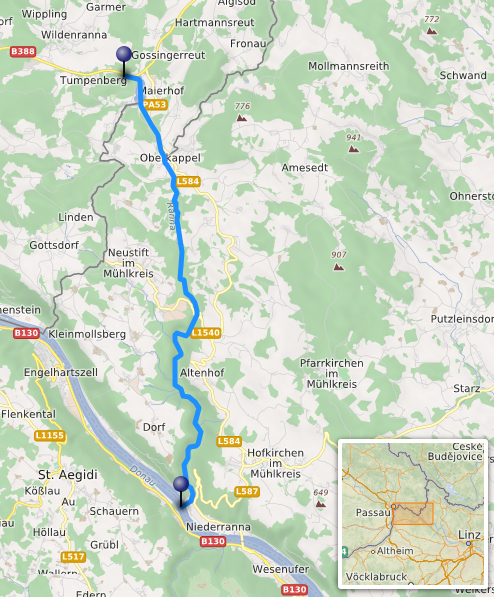

Location
- Countries: Germany / Austria
- States: Bavaria / Upper Austria

Physical characteristics
- Source
  - location: Southeast of Sonnen
  - coordinates: 48.6786°N 13.7338°E
- Mouth
  - location: At Rannamühl (Pfarrkirchen im Mühlkreis) into the Danube
  - coordinates: 48.4741°N 13.7759°E

Basin features
- Progression: Danube→ Black Sea

Ranna is a river of Bavaria, Germany and of Upper Austria, Austria.

The Ranna springs southeast of Sonnen in Bavaria. It discharges at Rannamühl (Pfarrkirchen im Mühlkreis) from the left into the Danube.

== See also ==
- List of rivers of Bavaria
- List of rivers of Austria
