= Litz =

Litz can refer to:

== People ==
- A. Walton Litz (1929–2014), American historian and educator
- Deacon Litz (1897–1967), American racecar driver.
- John Litz (born 1961), American politician.
- Nadia Litz (born 1976), American actress.
- Thomas Litz (born 1945), American figure skater.

== Other ==
- Litz wire - a braided wire used in electronics.
- Litz, Oise, a commune in northern France
- Litz (Austria), a river in Austria
- Litz (group), Filipino girl group
- "LITZ", a band from Baltimore, Maryland
