= Klausbach =

Klausbach may refer to:

- Klausbach (Ramsau), a river of Bavaria, Germany, main headwater of the Ramsauer Ache
- Klausbach (Salzach), a river of Salzburg, Austria, tributary of the Salzach
