= Devil's Pulpit =

Devil's Pulpit may refer to:

== Places ==
- The end of a gorge on the Mühlauer Bach, Tyrol, Austria
- A rock formation and golf course in Caledon, Ontario, Canada
- Devil's Pulpit, Gloucestershire, England
- A rock formation in Finnich Glen, Stirlingshire, Scotland

=== Germany ===
Various features named Teufelskanzel

- A rock formation in the Bode Gorge, Saxony-Anhalt
- A rock formation on the Brocken, Saxony-Anhalt
- A rock formation in the Frickenhofer Höhe, Baden-Württemberg
- A rock formation on the mountain Kandel, Baden-Württemberg

=== United States ===
- A rock formation in Bedford, New Hampshire
- A rock formation on Monument Mountain (Berkshire County, Massachusetts)
- A rock formation at Lehigh Gap, Pennsylvania
- A rock formation on Mount Diablo, Contra Costa County, California

== Other ==
- The Devil's Pulpit, a book of sermons by the English Radical Robert Taylor
