= Lohbach =

Lohbach may refer to:

- Lohbach, a small river of North Rhine-Westphalia, Germany, tributary of the Wupper
- Lohbach (Elbbach), a river of Hesse, Germany
- Lohbach (Inn), a stream in Innsbruck, Austria
