= Hintersee, Austria =

Hintersee
- Municipality
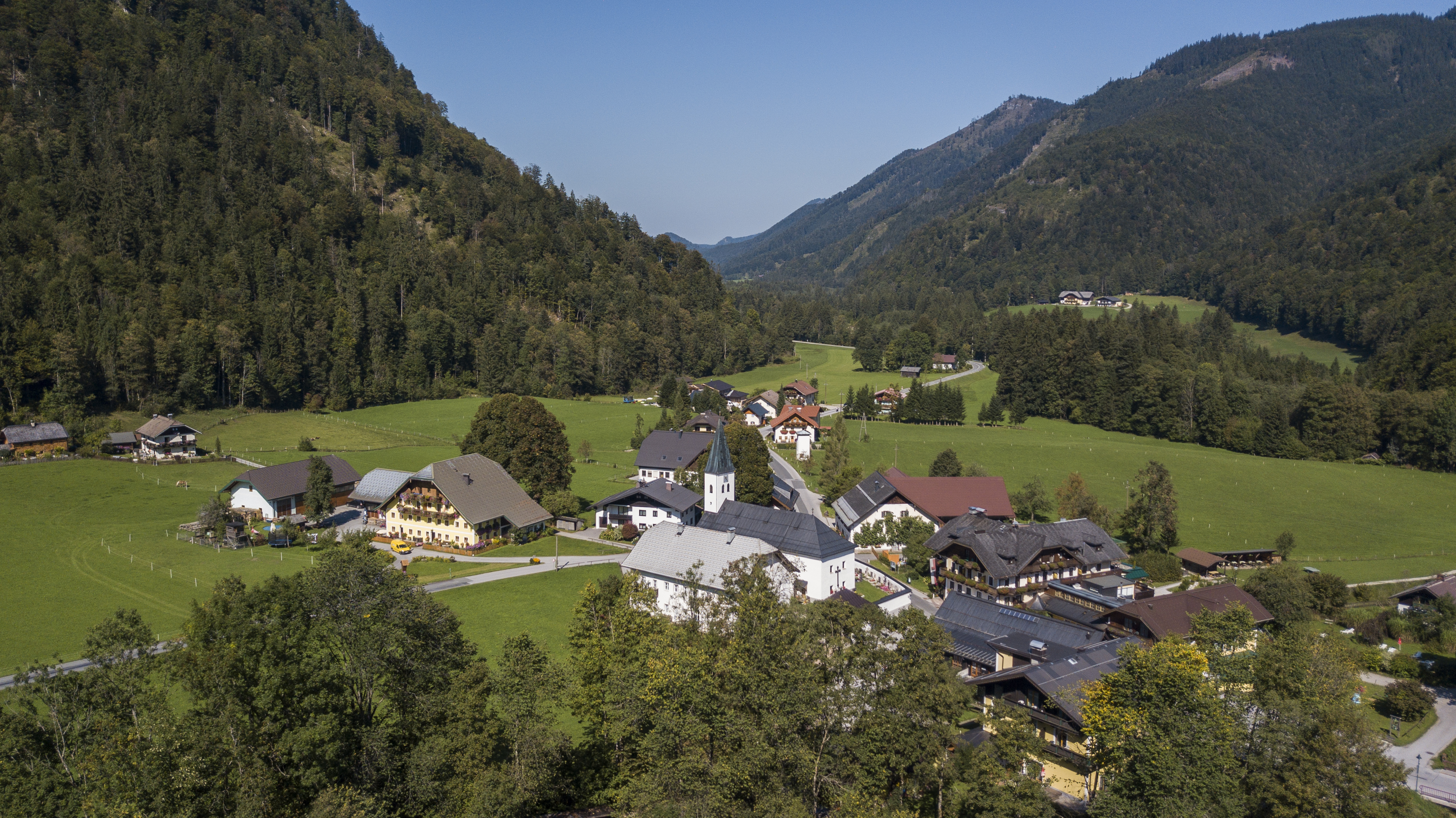
- Hintersee

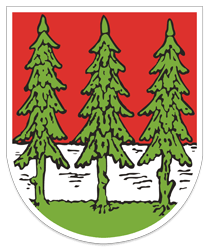
- Coat of arms

- Location within Austria
- Coordinates: 47°43′00″N 13°16′00″E
- Country: Austria
- State: Salzburg
- District: Salzburg-Umgebung

Government
  - Mayor: Paul Weissenbacher (ÖVP)

Area
  - Total: 47.44 km^{2} (18.32 sq mi)
- Elevation: 746 m (2,448 ft)

Population (2018-01-01)
  - Total: 443
  - Density: 9.34/km^{2} (24.2/sq mi)
- Time zone: UTC+1 (CET)
  - Summer (DST): UTC+2 (CEST)
- Postal code: 5324
- Area code: 06224
- Vehicle registration: SL
- Website: www.hintersee.salzburg.at

Hintersee is a municipality in the district of Salzburg-Umgebung in the state of Salzburg in Austria.

== Geography ==
The municipality lies in the Flachgau on the Tauglbach (Lämmerbach).
