= Sonnen (disambiguation) =

Sonnen is a municipality in Bavaria, Germany. Sonnen may also refer to

- Sonnen GmbH, a German renewable energy company
- Chael Sonnen (born 1977), American mixed martial artist and analyst
- Marc Sonnen (born 1988), American basketball player
- Sønnen fra Amerika, a 1957 Danish family film
