= Strassen =

Strassen may refer to:

- Volker Strassen, mathematician
- Strassen algorithm
- Strassen, Luxembourg, town and commune
- Strassen, Tyrol, town in the district of Lienz in Tyrol, Austria
