= Leckner Ach =

River in Germany

Leckner Ach Lecknerbach
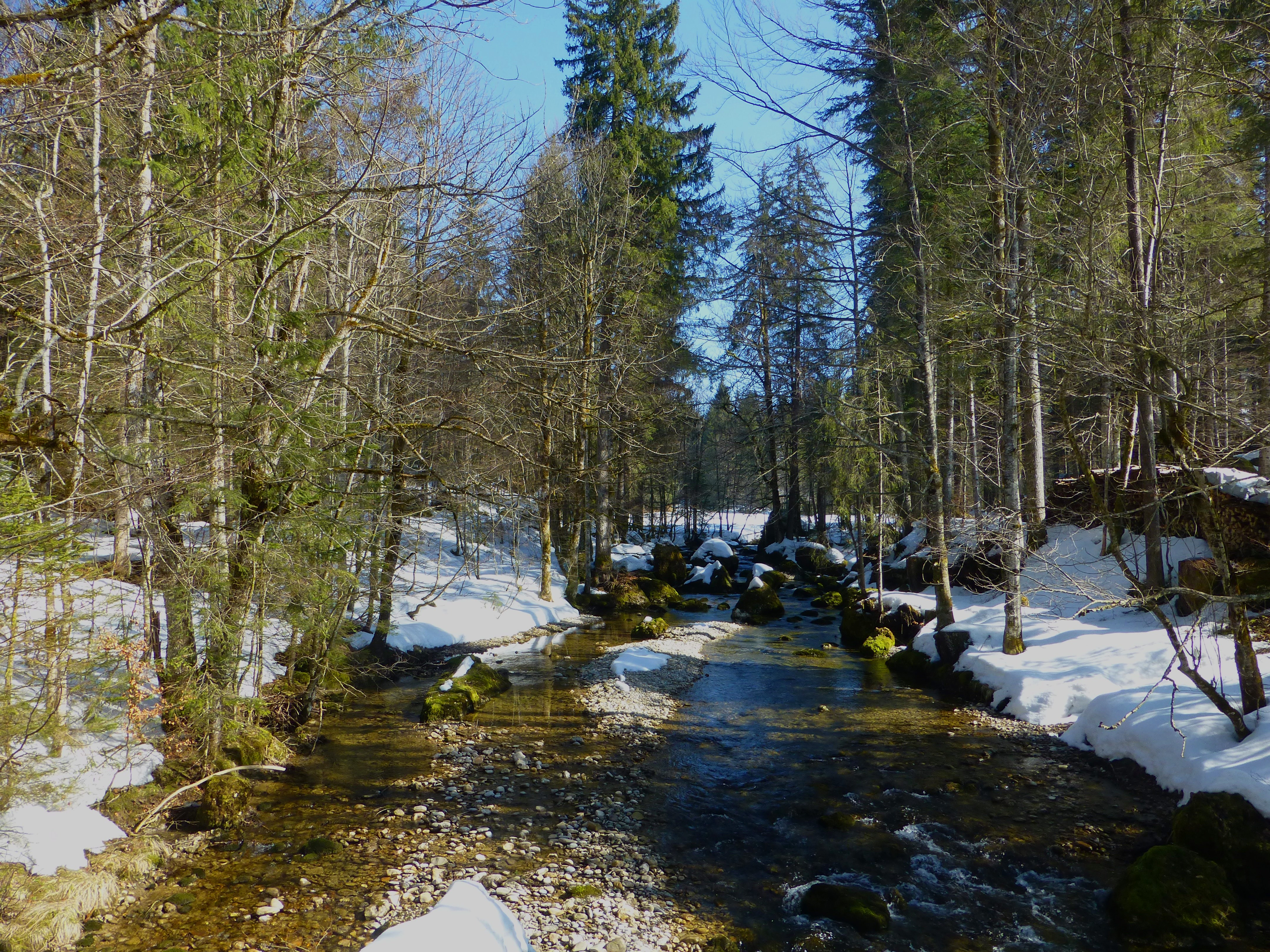
- The Leckner Ach near Hittisau

Location
- Countries: Austria and Germany
- States: Vorarlberg and Bavaria
- Reference no.: DE: 214622, AT: 8111441422

Physical characteristics
- Source
  - location: On the northwest slopes of the Girenkopf
  - coordinates: 47°28′51″N 10°06′11″E
  - elevation: ca. 1,600 m above sea level (NN)
- Mouth
  - location: East of Hittisau into the Bolgenach
  - coordinates: 47°27′34″N 9°59′48″E
  - elevation: ca. 790 m (AA)
- Length: 10.0 km (6.2 mi)

Basin features
- Progression: Bolgenach→ Weißach→ Bregenzer Ach→ Lake Constance→ Rhine→ North Sea

The Leckner Ach, also called the Lecknerbach, is a river of Vorarlberg, Austria and of Bavaria, Germany. It is a right-hand tributary of the Bolgenach east of Hittisau, and about 9 kilometres (5.6 mi) long.

== See also ==
- List of rivers of Austria
- List of rivers of Bavaria
