= Gailbach (Drava) =

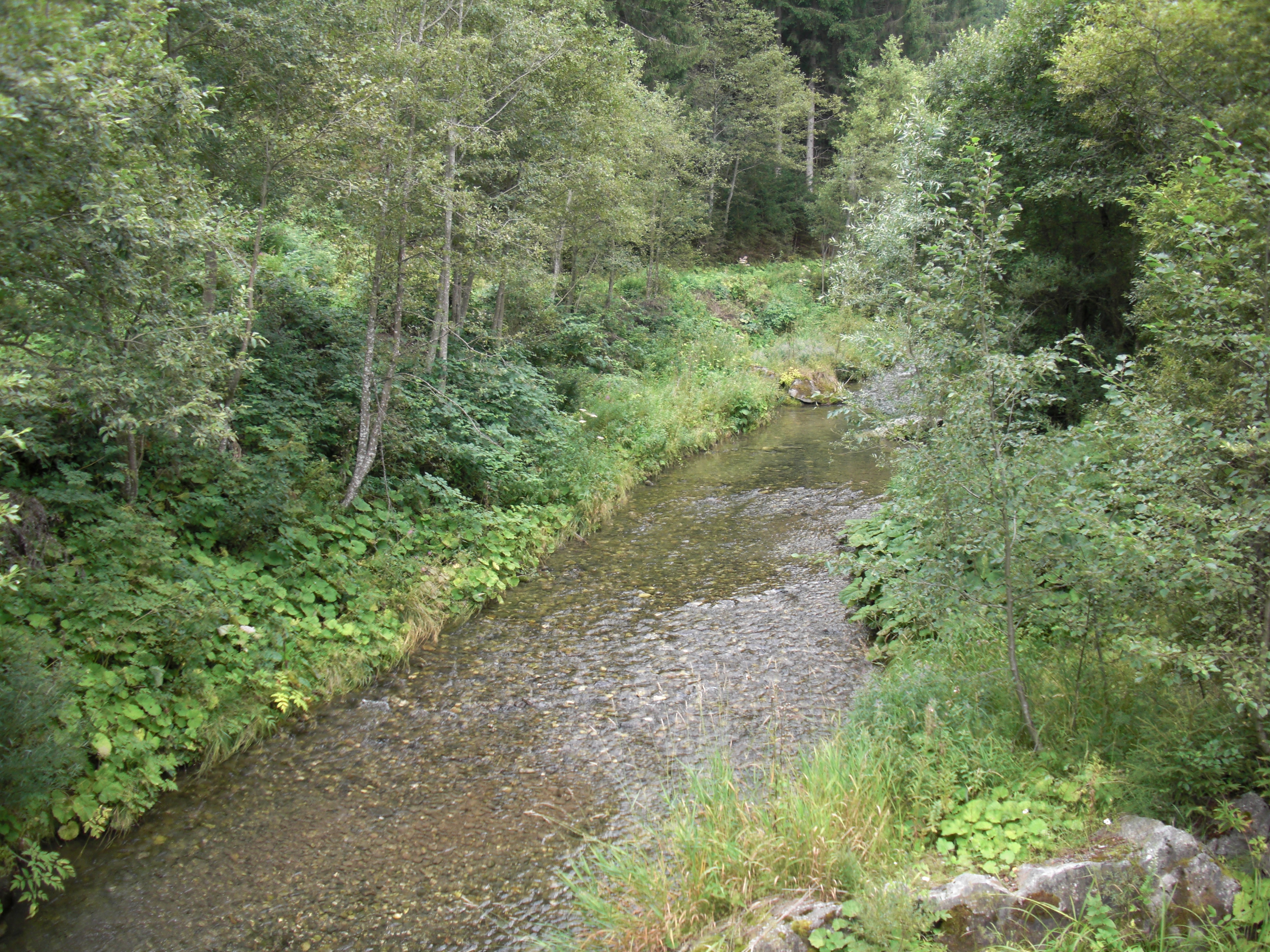

Location
- Countries: Austria
- State: Tyrol

Physical characteristics
- Source
  - location: Kartitsch Saddle
  - coordinates: 46.7235°N 12.5413°E
- Mouth
  - location: at Tassenbach, a district of Strassen
  - coordinates: 46.7453°N 12.4833°E
- Basin size: 45 km^{2} (17 sq mi)

Basin features
- Progression: Drava→ Danube→ Black Sea

Gailbach is a river of East Tyrol, Austria. It is a right tributary the Drava. Its drainage basin is 45 km^{2} (17 sq mi).
