= Gleirschbach =

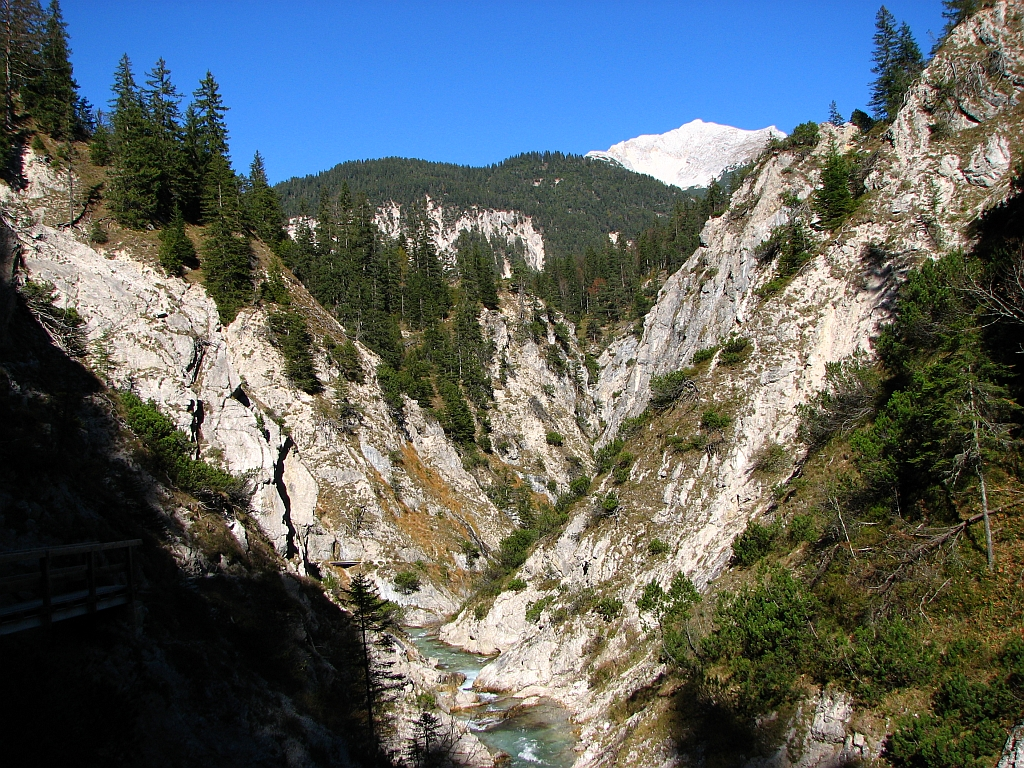

Location
- Country: Austria
- State: Tyrol

Physical characteristics
- Source
  - location: north of the alpine hut Pfeishütte
  - coordinates: 47.3357°N 11.4278°E
- Mouth
  - location: at the exit of the Hinterau valley into the Isar
  - coordinates: 47.3759°N 11.3084°E
- Length: ~ 12 km (7.5 mi)

Basin features
- Progression: Isar→ Danube→ Black Sea

The Gleirschbach is a river of Tyrol, Austria, a tributary of the Isar.

The Gleirschbach originates north of the alpine hut Pfeishütte. It has a length of app. 12 km (7.5 mi), 7.40 km (4.60 mi) of these on the city area of Innsbruck. At the "Möslalm" the Gleirschbach picks up the 1.40 km (0.87 mi) long Angerbach, which originates on the northern side of the Nordkette. At the exit of the Hinterau valley the Gleirschbach merges with the Isar. The water possesses A grade quality and is popular among rafting-fans.
