= Erzbach =

Erzbach may refer to:

- Erzbach (Enns), a river of Styria, Austria, tributary of the Enns
- Erzbach (Osterbach), a river of Hesse, Germany, tributary of the Osterbach
- Erzbach, a part of the community Reichelsheim (Odenwald), Hesse, Germany
