= Brandenberger Ache =

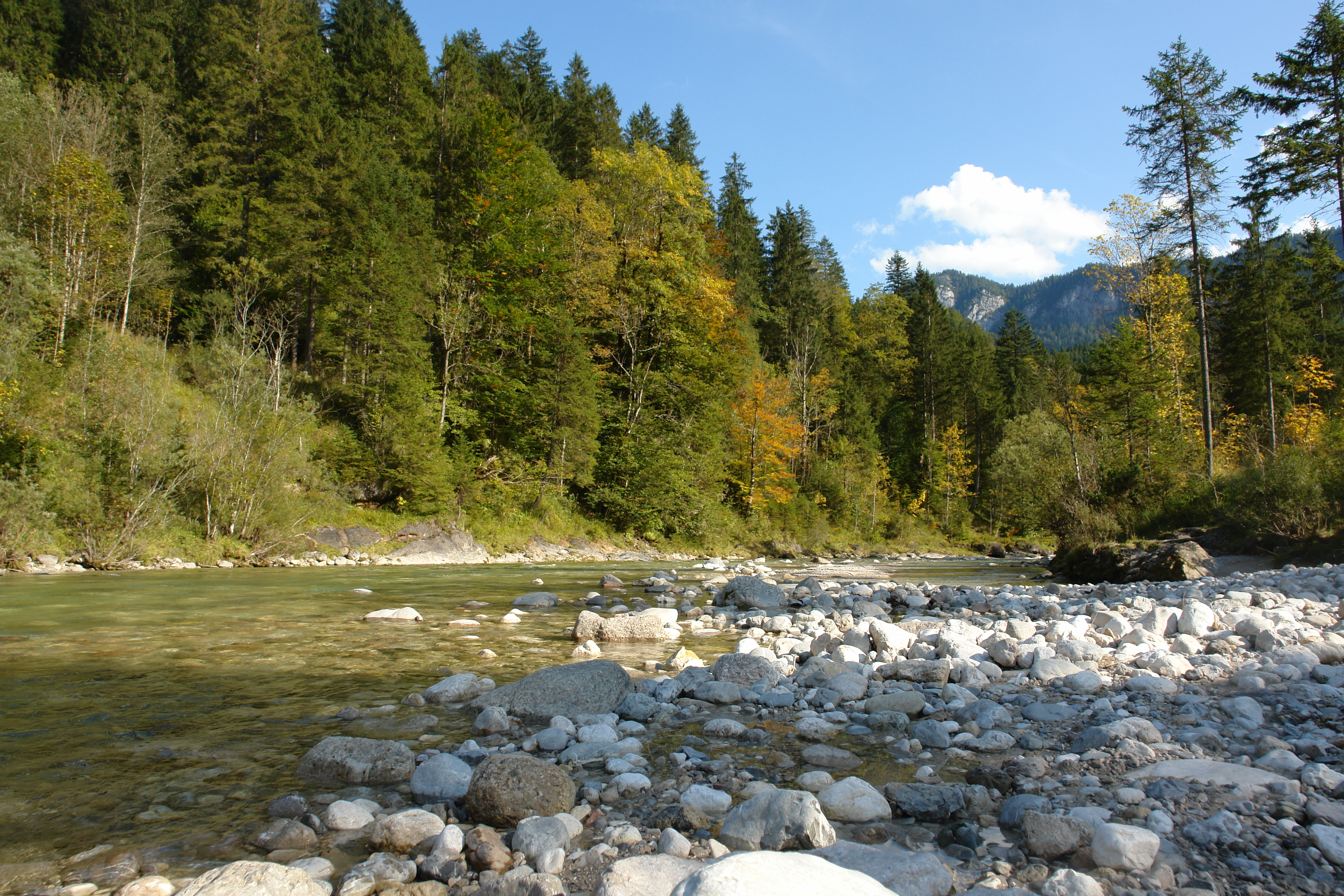
- The Brandenburger Ache before it flows into the slot canyon Kaiserklamm

Location
- Countries: Germany and Austria
- States: Bavaria and Tyrol

Physical characteristics
- Source
  - location: Spitzingsee
- Mouth
  - location: Inn
  - coordinates: 47.4468°N 11.8977°E
- Length: 37.8 km (23.5 mi)
- Basin size: 283 km^{2} (109 sq mi)

Basin features
- Progression: Inn→ Danube→ Black Sea

The Brandenberger Ache is a river of Bavaria, Germany, and of the Kufstein District, Tyrol, Austria.

It is a 38 km (24 mi) long left tributary of the Inn. It starts as the outflow of the Spitzingsee in southern Bavaria, and flows from north to south to the town of Rattenberg where it merges with the Inn.

== See also ==
- List of rivers of Bavaria
- List of rivers of Austria
