= Steinbach (Saalach) =

River in Germany

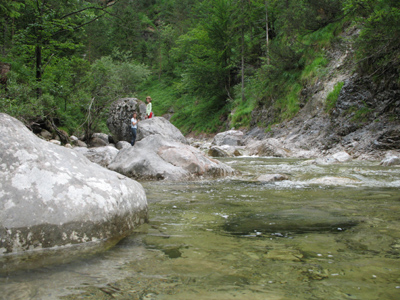
- The Steinbach at Schneizlreuth

Location
- Countries: Germany and Austria
- States: Bavaria and Salzburg

Physical characteristics
- Mouth
  - location: Saalach
  - coordinates: 47.6633°N 12.7568°E

Basin features
- Progression: Saalach→ Salzach→ Inn→ Danube→ Black Sea

Steinbach is a river of Bavaria, Germany and of Salzburg, Austria. It is a tributary of the Saalach between Unken and Schneizlreuth.

== See also ==
- List of rivers of Bavaria
