= Lindenbach (Inn) =

Location
- Country: Austria
- State: Upper Austria

Physical characteristics
- Source
  - location: Southwest of Schardenberg
  - coordinates: 48.5192°N 13.4902°E
- Mouth
  - location: At Wernstein am Inn into the Inn
  - coordinates: 48.5086°N 13.4576°E

Basin features
- Progression: Inn→ Danube→ Black Sea

Lindenbach is a river of Upper Austria.

The Lindenbach springs southwest of Schardenberg. It is a right tributary of the Inn at Wernstein am Inn.
