= Meng (river) =

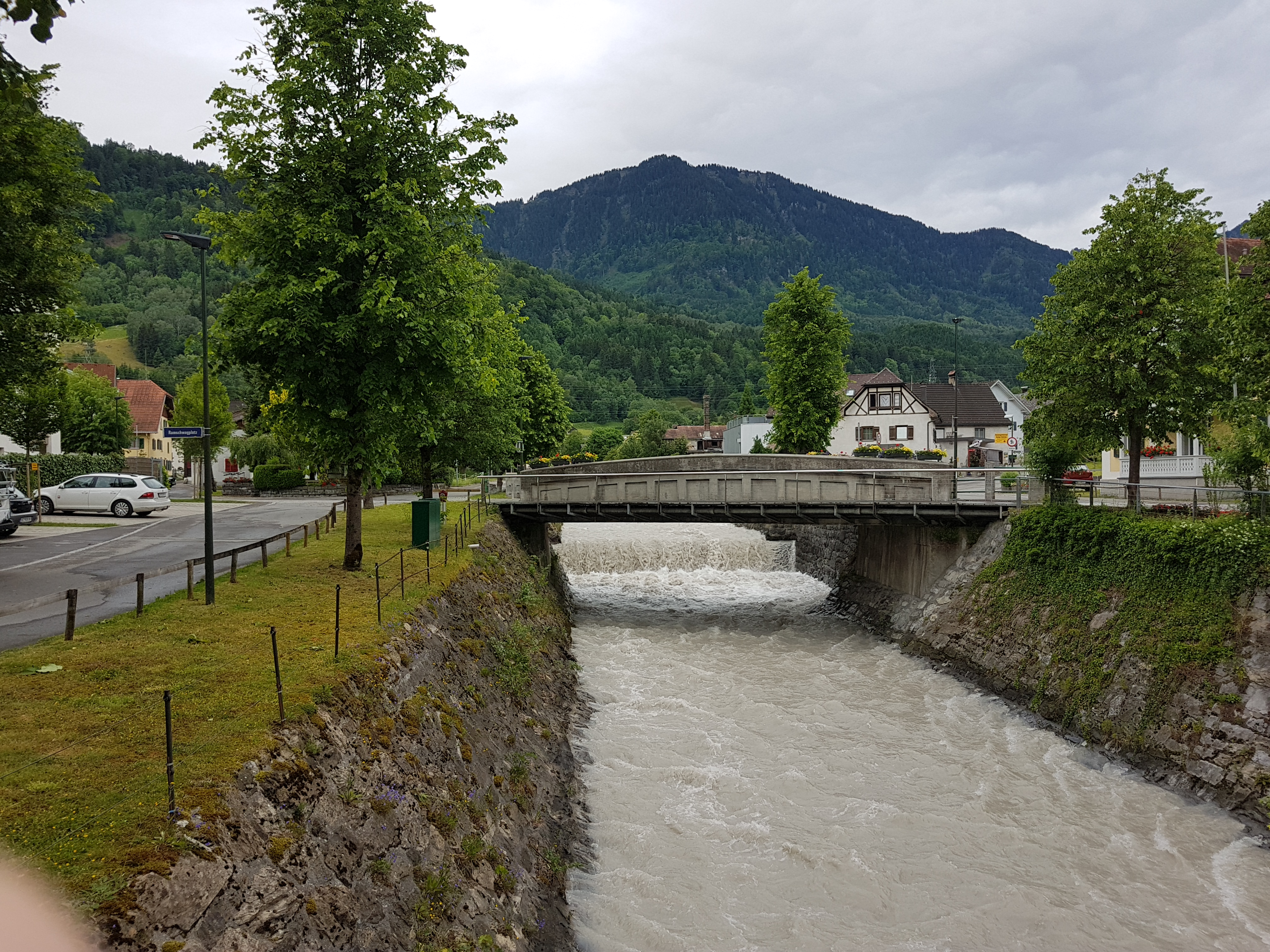
- The Meng in Nenzing

Location
- Country: Austria
- State: Vorarlberg

Physical characteristics
- Source
  - location: Near the Naafkopf mountain
  - coordinates: 47.0550°N 9.6309°E
  - elevation: about 2,390 metres (7,840 ft)
- Mouth
  - location: At Nenzing into the Ill
  - coordinates: 47.1913°N 9.7142°E
- Length: 18 km (11 mi)

Basin features
- Progression: Ill→ Rhine→ North Sea

The Meng is a river in Vorarlberg, Austria.

The Meng is 18 kilometres (11 mi) long. It originates near the Naafkopf mountain. It flows through the valley Gamperdonatal in a northern direction. At the municipality of Nenzing, it discharges into the Ill.

The Gampbach, a river of 5 kilometres (3.1 mi) length, flows from the right side into the middle section of the Meng.
