= Höttinger Bach =

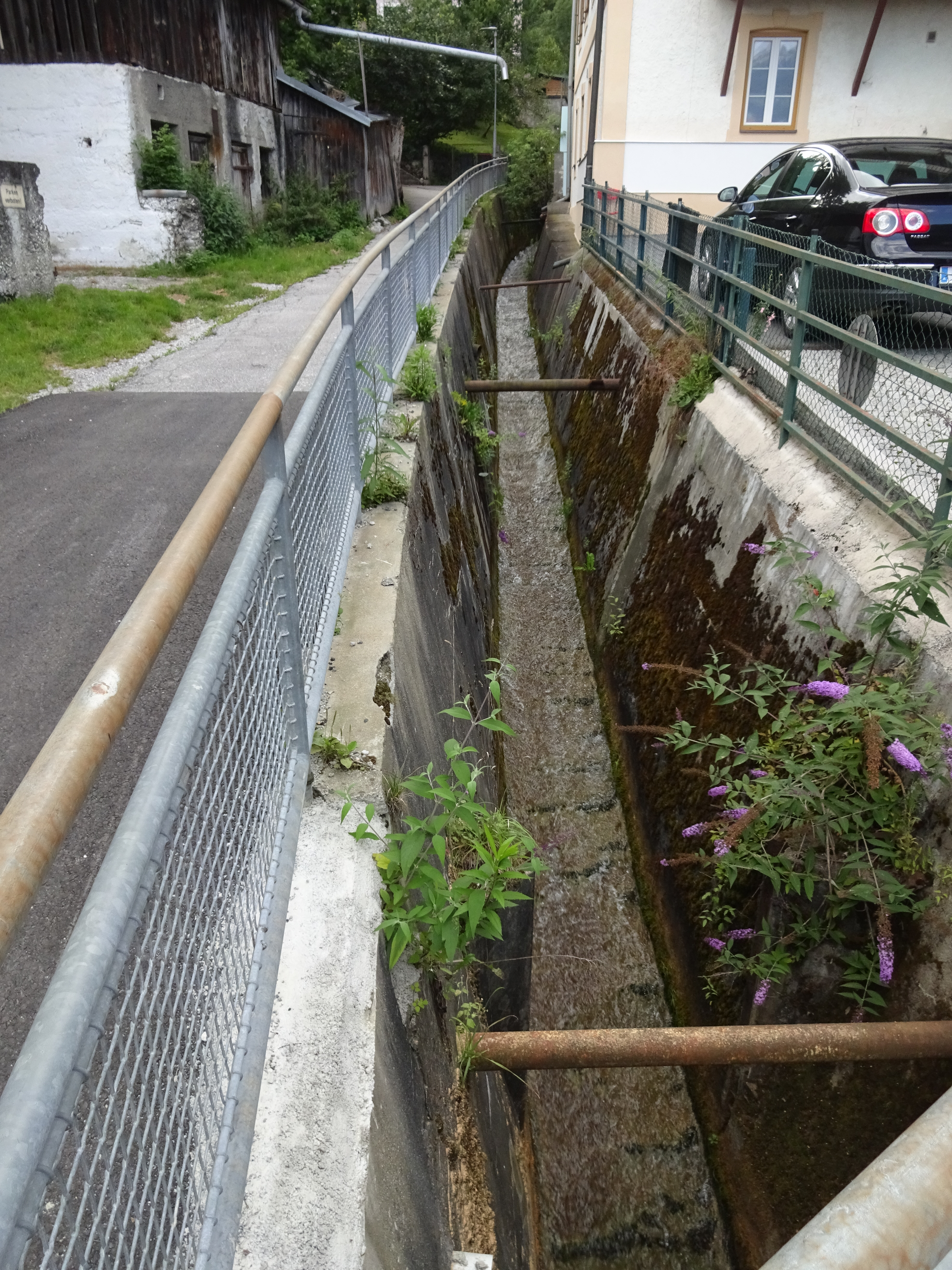

Location
- Country: Austria
- State: Tyrol

Physical characteristics
- Source
  - location: Umbrückler Alm above Innsbruck
  - elevation: 1,100 m (3,600 ft)
- Mouth
  - location: Inn River near Innsbruck-Mariahilf
  - coordinates: 47.2675°N 11.3878°E
- Length: 4.0 km (2.5 mi)

Basin features
- Progression: Inn→ Danube→ Black Sea

The Höttinger Bach is a river of Tyrol, Austria. It is a 4 km (2.5 mi) long left tributary of the Inn in Innsbruck and its entire length lies in the Innsbruck city area.

The Höttinger Bach originates on 1,100 m (AA) below the Umbrückler Alm and runs straight in southern direction to the city district Mariahilf where it merges with theInn. In the course of time it created a small ravine called Höttinger Graben. The overground part is visible until the street Kirschentalgasse.

Near its origin the city erected a drinking water reservoir, which mainly supplies the Hungerburg region additionally. Its excellent A grade quality is kept by the river in the whole course.

The small river may look like a harmless water but can quickly get flooded due to high water or strong rain. Hötting had to suffer from this already several times.
