= Taugl =

Taugl Tauglbach
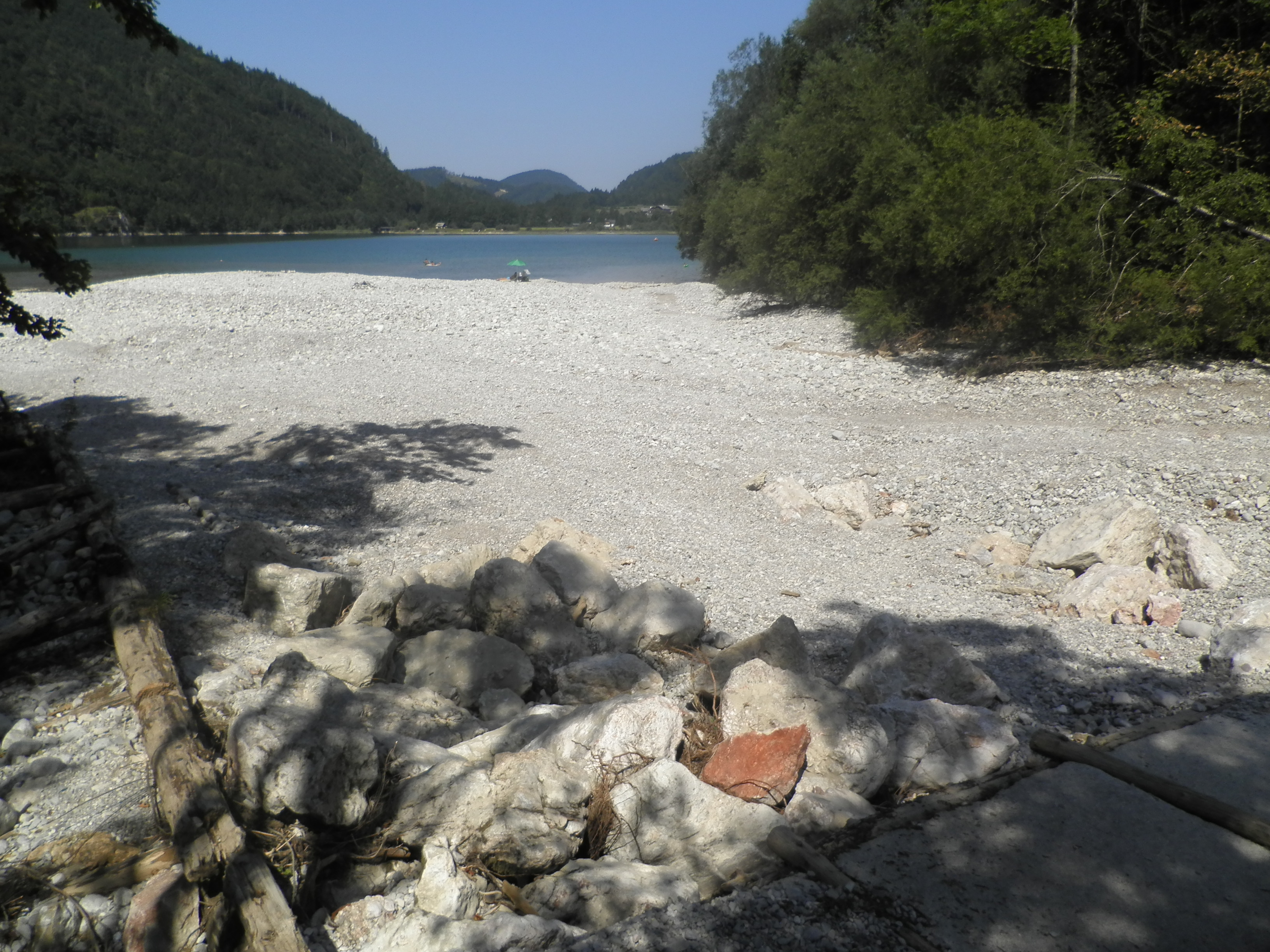
- Gravel bank of the Tauglbach discharging into the Hintersee

Location
- Country: Austria
- State: Salzburg

Physical characteristics
- Source
  - location: Near the mountains Gennerhorn and Gruberhorn
- Mouth
  - location: Lake Hintersee
  - coordinates: 47.7469°N 13.2525°E
- Length: ~ 10 km (6.2 mi)

Basin features
- Progression: Almbach→ Salzach→ Inn→ Danube→ Black Sea

The Taugl or also Tauglbach is a river of the State of Salzburg, Austria.

The Taugl rises near the mountains Gennerhorn and Gruberhorn (in the Salzkammergut Mountains) at a height of approx. 1,700 m (AA). The river flows from south to north into the lake Hintersee, which is drained by the Almbach. The river has a length of approx. 10 km (6.2 mi), of which 8 km (5.0 mi) is through a ravine. It is therefore classified as a dangerous white water river. The water quality is classified as A grade.
