= Rabnitzbach =

Rabnitzbach Rabnitz
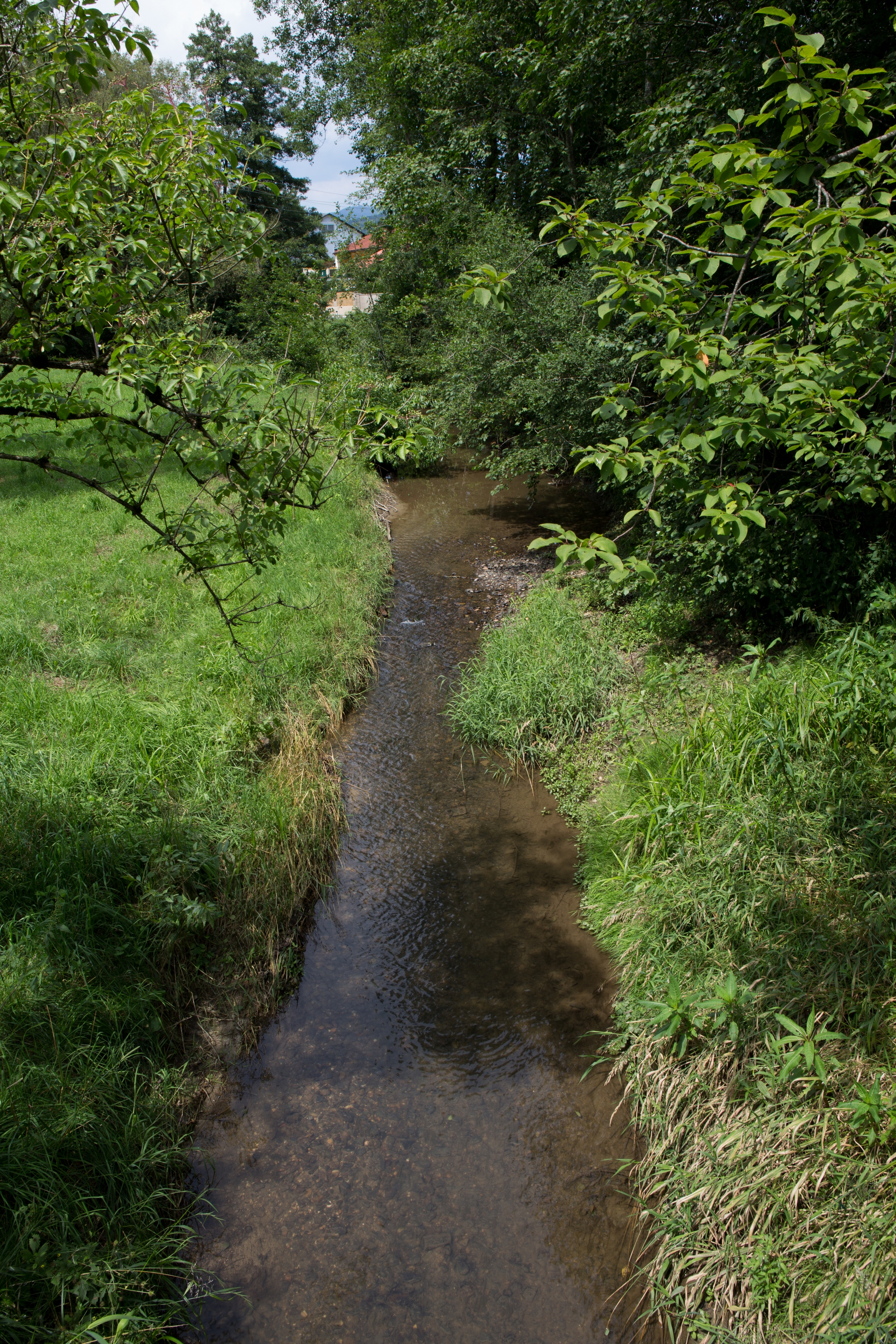
- The Rabnitzbach at Kumberg

Location
- Country: Austria
- State: Styria

Physical characteristics
- Source
  - location: near mount Schöckl
- Mouth
  - location: Rába near Gleisdorf
  - coordinates: 47.0971°N 15.7008°E
- Length: 28.3 km (17.6 mi)
- Basin size: 131 km^{2} (51 sq mi)

Basin features
- Progression: Rába→ Danube→ Black Sea

The Rabnitzbach (also Rabnitz) is a river of Styria, Austria, one of the source rivers of the Rába (Raab).

The Rabnitzbach originates near mount Schöckl and flows in south-east direction to Gleisdorf where it merges with the Rába. The river reaches a length of 28.3 km (17.6 mi). Its basin area is 131 km^{2} (51 sq mi).

The water has Grade A quality and is one cleaner waters of Styria. It is rich on fishes. The normally harmless river can very quickly become a flood hazard and has already been a threat several times. Dangerous points have been mitigated without causing significant damage to nature.
