= Geroldsbach =

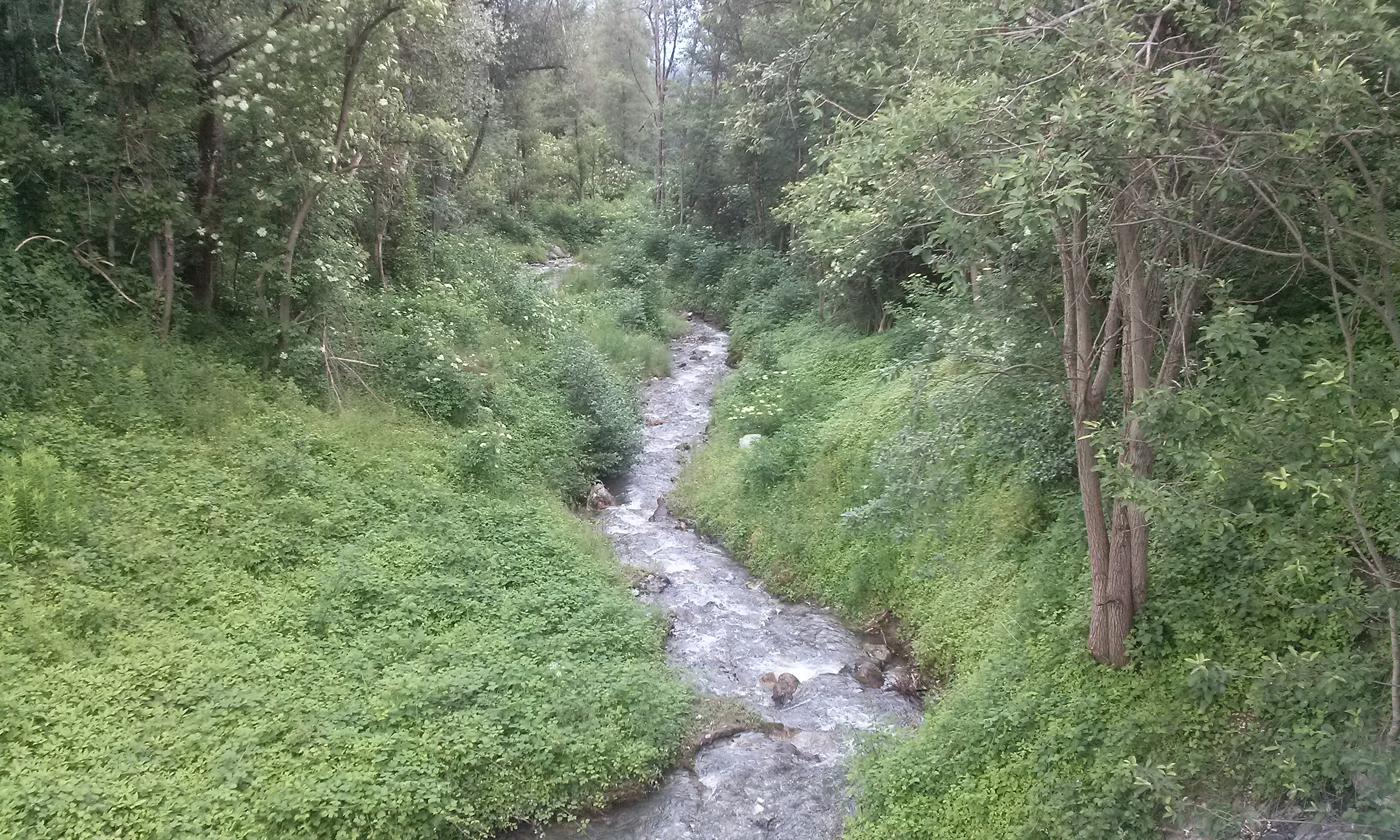
- The Geroldsbach downstream of the street Neu-Götzener Straße

Location
- Country: Austria
- State: Tyrol

Physical characteristics
- Source
  - location: near Axamer Lizum
  - coordinates: 47.1981°N 11.3170°E
  - elevation: 1,900 m (AA)
- Mouth
  - location: Inn at Sieglanger, Innsbruck
  - coordinates: 47.2545°N 11.3527°E
- Length: 8 km (5.0 mi)

Basin features
- Progression: Inn→ Danube→ Black Sea

The Geroldsbach is a river of Tyrol, Austria.

It originates from five fan-like source streams near Axamer Lizum at 1,900 m (6,200 ft) (AA). It flows through Götzens where it changes its direction to northeast and passes through the district Neu-Götzens. It flows further through Wilten, a district of Innsbruck. Finally, it discharges in the district Sieglanger of Innsbruck into the Inn. The Geroldsbach has a length of 8 kilometres (5.0 mi) whereof 3.9 kilometres (2.4 mi) lie in the Innsbruck city area.

The Geroldsbach provides four water reservoirs for the region Götzens and two in Wilten with drinking water, which is mainly used for supplying the prisons Innsbruck and Sieglanger. As a result, the lower course carries slightly less water; it retains Grade A water quality throughout its entire course.

In the event of flooding or heavy rainfall, the river proved to be a danger several times, so it was straightened in places in the local areas.
