= Tuffbach (Inn) =

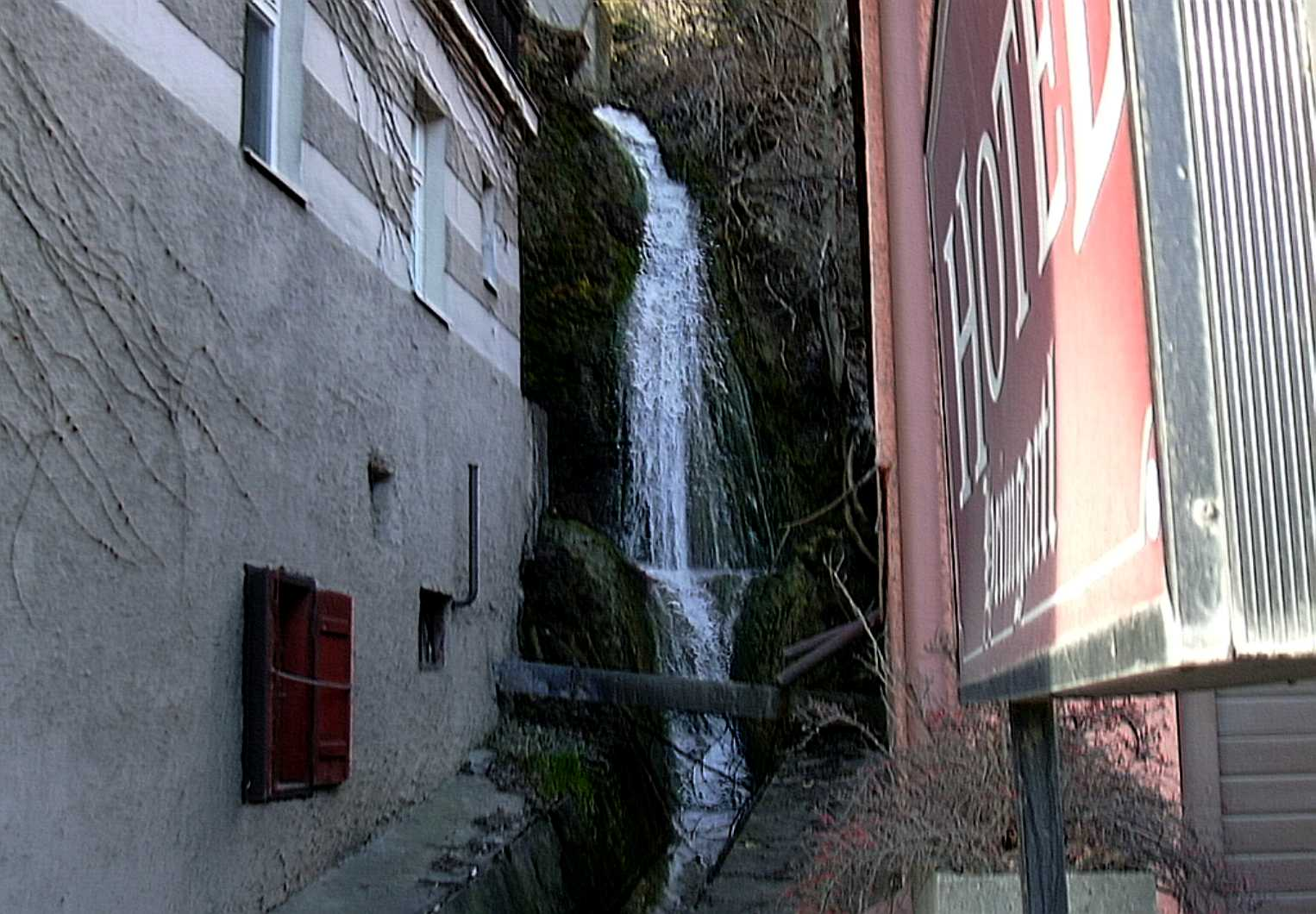
- Weissbach Fall

Location
- Country: Austria
- State: Tyrol

Physical characteristics
- Source
  - location: Lepsius-Stollen
  - elevation: 720 m (2,360 ft)
- Mouth
  - location: Inn
  - coordinates: 47.2796°N 11.4013°E
- Length: 1.5 km (0.93 mi)

Basin features
- Progression: Inn→ Danube→ Black Sea

The Tuffbach, also known locally as the Weissbach, is a river of Tyrol, Austria, a tributary of the Inn.

The Tuffbach originates in the Lepsius-Stollen (a gallery at the abandoned quarry in Hötting, Innsbruck) at 720 m (AA). It runs in a southerly direction past the Engländergrab to the Hoher Weg where it merges near the old Hungerburg railway bridge with the Inn. The Tuffbach lies entirely within the municipal territory of Innsbruck.

Although the river is only 1.5 kilometres (0.93 mi) long, it has an interesting feature: At one point its waters drop through a height of 12 metres (39 ft) forming the Weissbach Fall, which is audible and visible from the nearby street. A small hotel has built a power plant there and uses the electricity generated for domestic requirements. Around the basin are canals, which divert the water in case of emergency.

Another feature is the high water speed near the mouth (~120 km/h (75 mph)).

The water is usually of grade B quality.
