= Aist (river) =

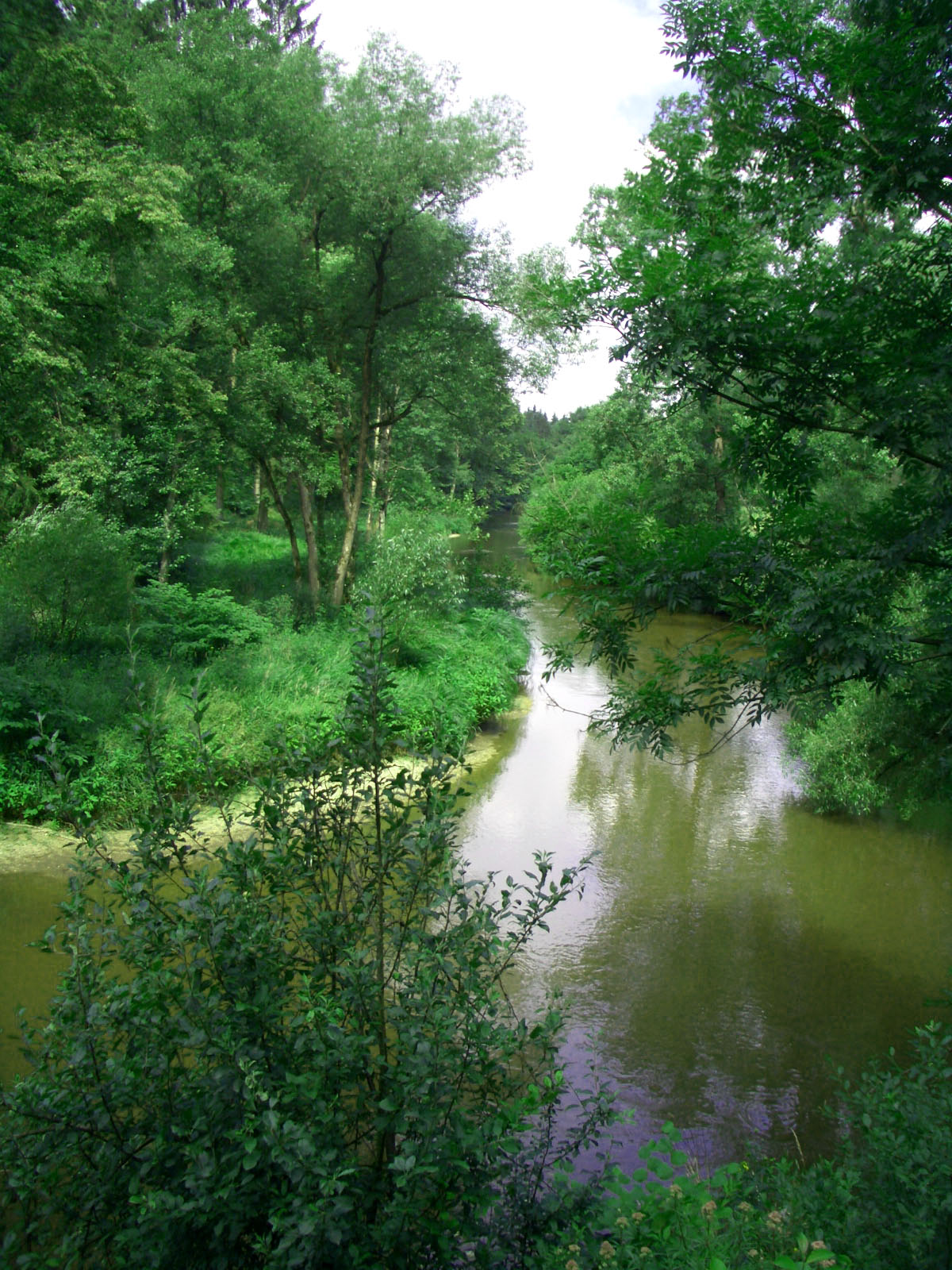
- The Aist near Hohensteg (Schwertberg/Upper Austria)

Location
- Country: Austria

Physical characteristics
- Source: confluence of Feldaist and Waldaist
  - coordinates: 48°19′14″N 14°33′56″E
- Mouth: Danube
  - coordinates: 48.2311°N 14.5648°E
- Length: 13.7 km (8.5 mi)
- Basin size: 636 km^{2} (246 sq mi)

Basin features
- Progression: Danube→ Black Sea

The Aist is a river in Upper Austria, a left tributary of the Danube. It drains an area of 636 km^{2} (246 sq mi).

The Aist is formed in Hohensteg (south of Pregarten) by the confluence of its source rivers the Feldaist (52 km) and the Waldaist (58 km). The Aist proper is 13.7 km (8.5 mi) long. The Aist, Feldaist and Waldaist flow through the protected Natura 2000 site Waldaist-Naarn (Fauna-Flora-Habitat Area).

== History ==
The name "Aist" was derived from a Slavic river designation, recorded in ancient documents such as the Wilhelmine deed. Upper Austria, as well as many other parts of Europe, were at that time inhabited by Slavic peoples. The river appeared for the first time in 853 in a deed as "Agasta". In 983 it is called "Agesta". The prefix "ag" means "drive" or "fast". The name of Dietmar von Aist (1140–1171), a Minnesänger, may be related to the Aist.

In the August 2002 flood, the entire Aist area was devastated.
