= Hartbach =

River of Upper Austria

Hartbach Reichersberger Bach
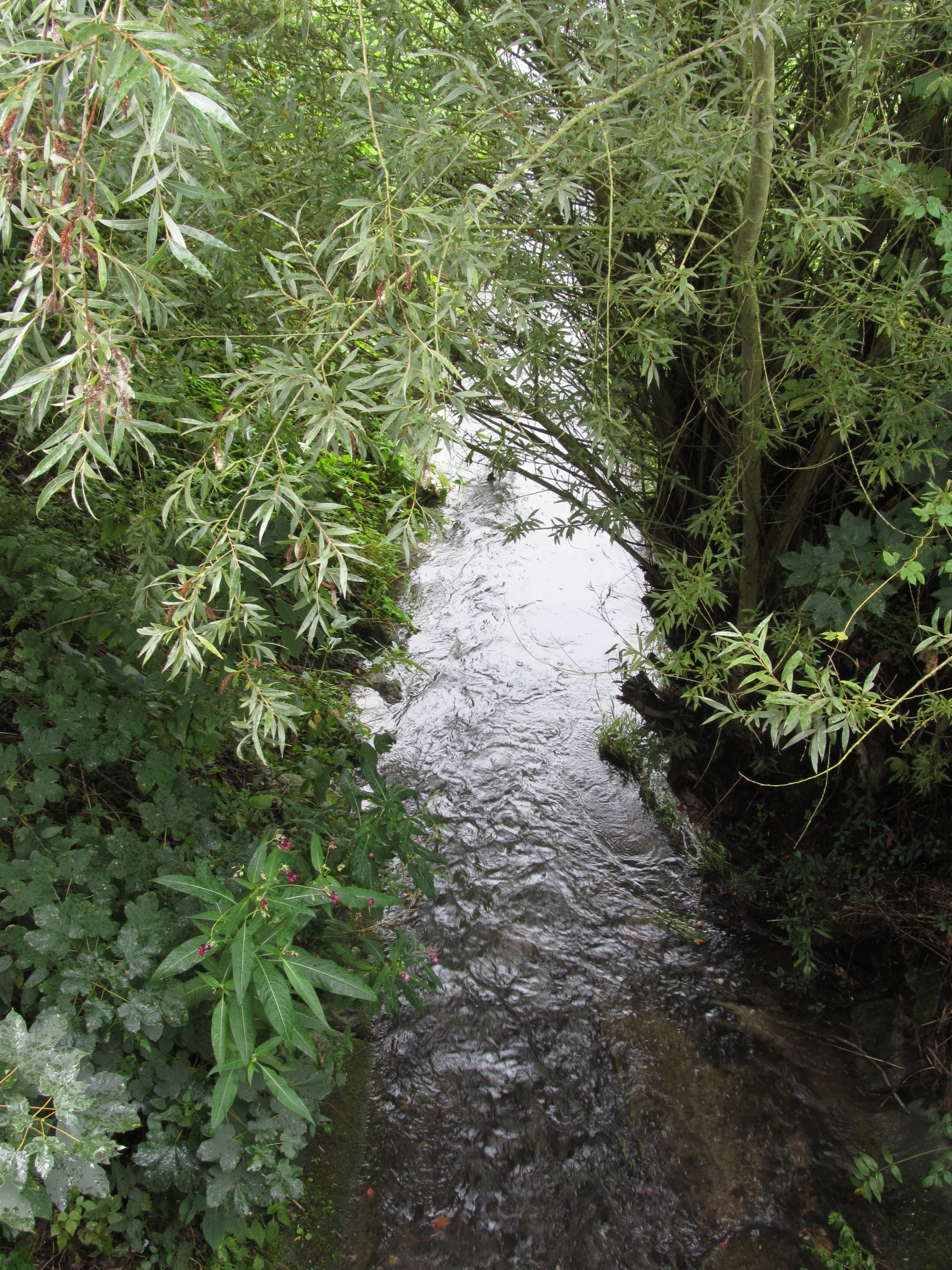

Location
- Country: Austria
- State: Upper Austria

Physical characteristics
- Source
  - location: near Senftenbach
- Mouth
  - location: Inn
  - coordinates: 48.3400°N 13.3602°E
- Length: 22.4 km (13.9 mi)

Basin features
- Progression: Inn→ Danube→ Black Sea

The Hartbach (also called Reichersberger Bach) is a river of Upper Austria, a small, right tributary of the Inn.

The Hartbach originates in the Senftenbach area. It flows from south to north to the Inn and merges with it 2 km (1.2 mi) east of Obernberg am Inn.
