= Weißenbach (Inn) =

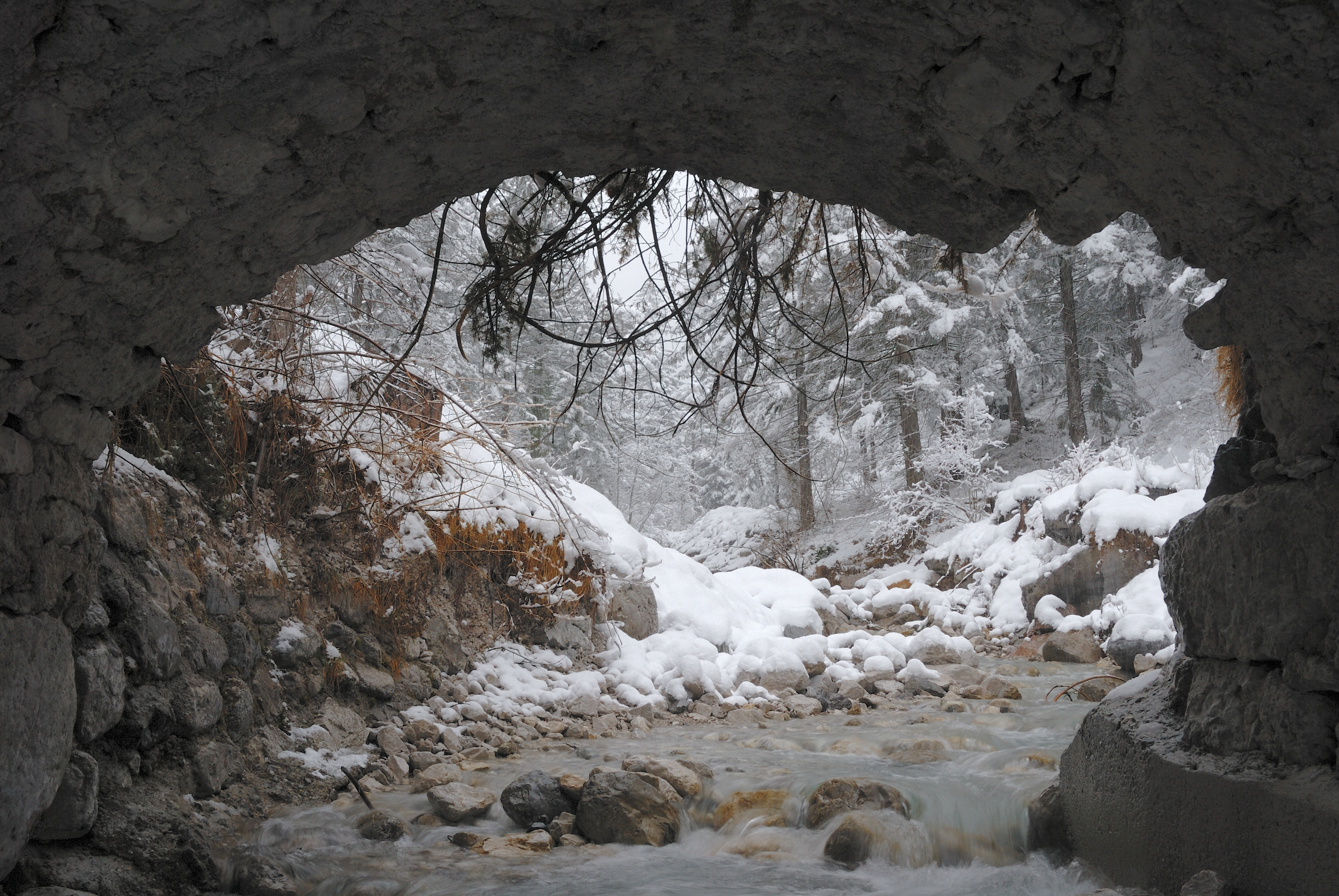

Location
- Country: Austria
- State: Tyrol

Physical characteristics
- Source
  - location: In the valley Halltal
- Mouth
  - location: Inn
  - coordinates: 47.2786°N 11.5283°E
- Length: 9.4 km (5.8 mi)

Basin features
- Progression: Inn→ Danube→ Black Sea

The Weißenbach is a river of Tyrol, Austria, a tributary of the Inn.

The Weißenbach rises in the valley Halltal and flows near Absam from Gnadenwald to the south to the village of Mils, which is located 12 km (7.5 mi) east of Innsbruck. In Mils just after the Lower Inn Valley Railway bridge it discharges into the Inn. The river has a gradient of 8 - 9%. It divides into three parts:

- The main part passes through Mils in a large gravel layer with a water quality between A and B grade. The river has already been channelised several times but is still a danger for the village.
- Side arm 1: As the Amtsbach this arm flows through Absam as far as the Münzturm of Hall in Tirol where it changes its direction eastward to Mils. This is the larger one of the two arms and provides Absam with its drinking water supply as well as water for a saw mill. The grade fluctuates between A and B grade.
- Side arm 2: As the Baubach the second arm flows through Eichat to Hall in Tirol where it merges with the Amtsbach and then flows further east to rejoin the main part. In Eichat the river is often misused as a rubbish dump which reduces the water quality to B grade.

From Hall in Tirol to Mils the water quality is B grade due to the wastewater of the city and the facilities which use the water. In the larger undercurrents there are few fish anyway.
