= Fallbach (Inn, Baumkirchen) =

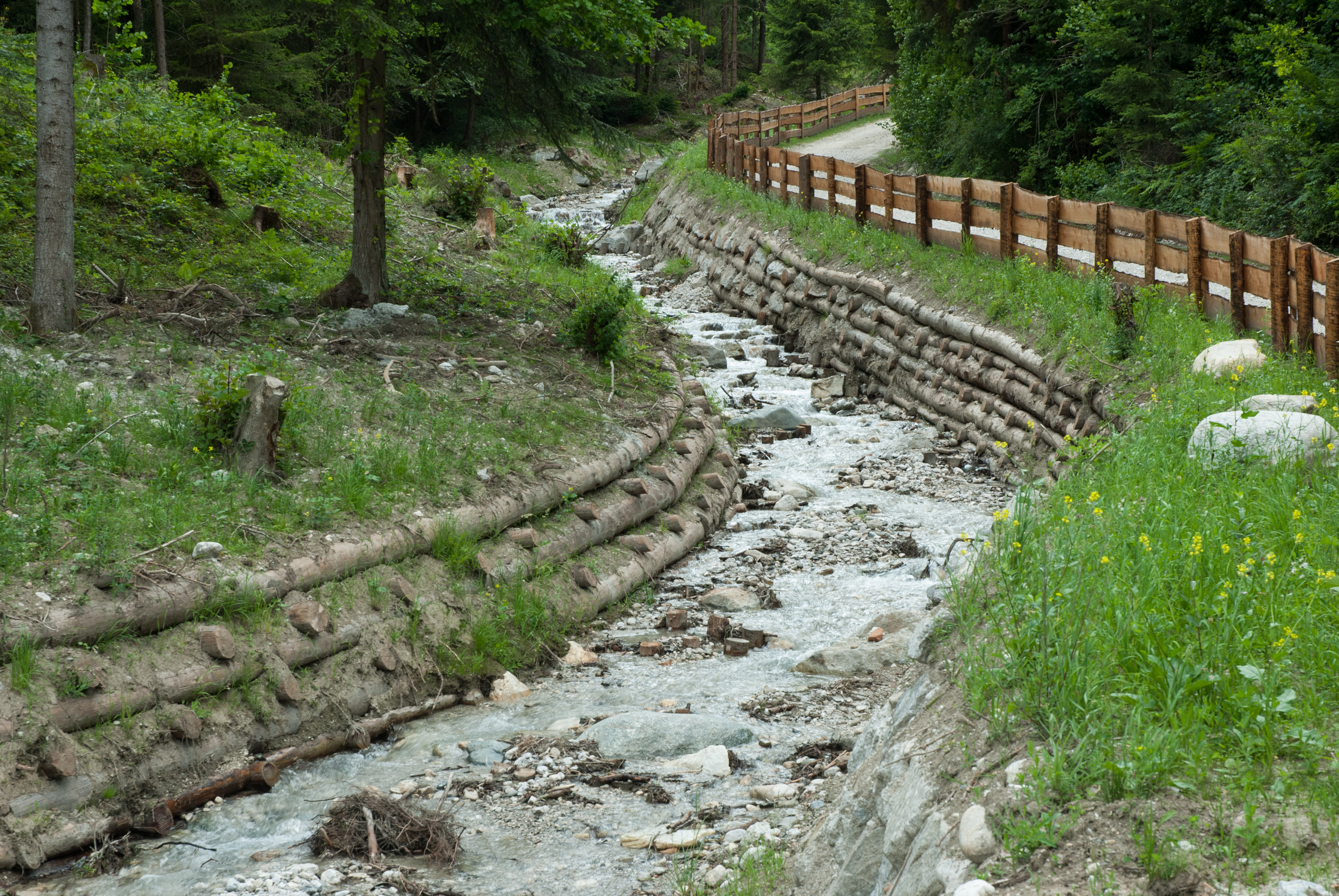
- The Fallbach at Baumkirchen

Location
- Country: Austria
- State: Tyrol

Physical characteristics
- Source
  - location: north of Absam
  - coordinates: 47.3294°N 11.5307°E
- Mouth
  - location: at Baumkirchen into the Inn
  - coordinates: 47.2970°N 11.5663°E

Basin features
- Progression: Inn→ Danube→ Black Sea

Fallbach is a river of Tyrol, Austria, a left tributary of the Inn at Baumkirchen. It should not be confused with the similarly named river, a left Inn tributary in Innsbruck.

The source of the Fallbach is north of Absam in the Gleirsch-Halltal Chain.
