= Litz (Austria) =

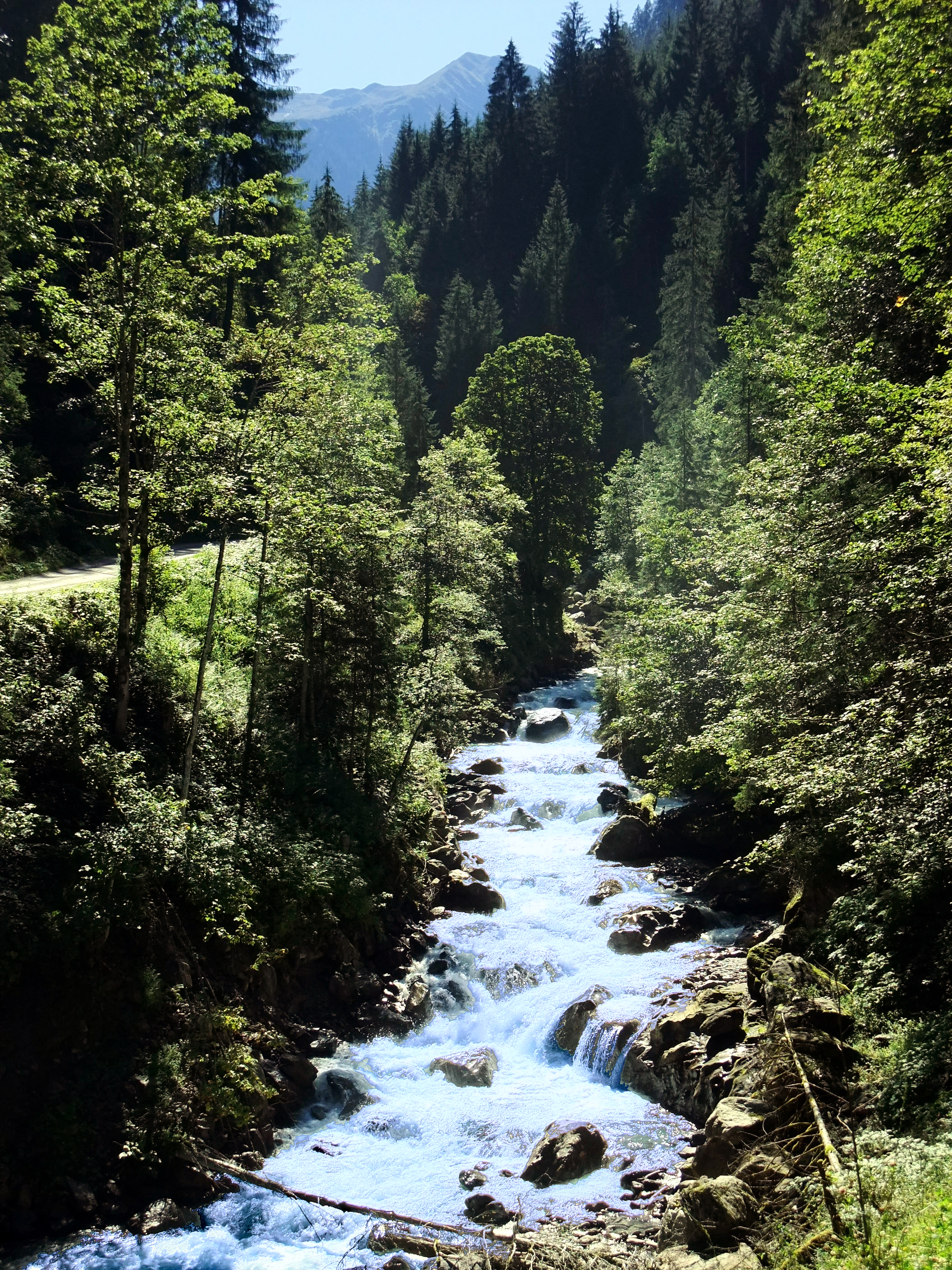
- The Litz in its lower reaches near Silbertal

Location
- Country: Austria
- State: Vorarlberg

Physical characteristics
- Source
  - location: Alpe Fresch
  - elevation: 1,800 m (5,900 ft)
- Mouth
  - location: Ill
  - coordinates: 47.0792°N 9.9027°E
- Length: 22 km (14 mi)

Basin features
- Progression: Ill→ Rhine→ North Sea

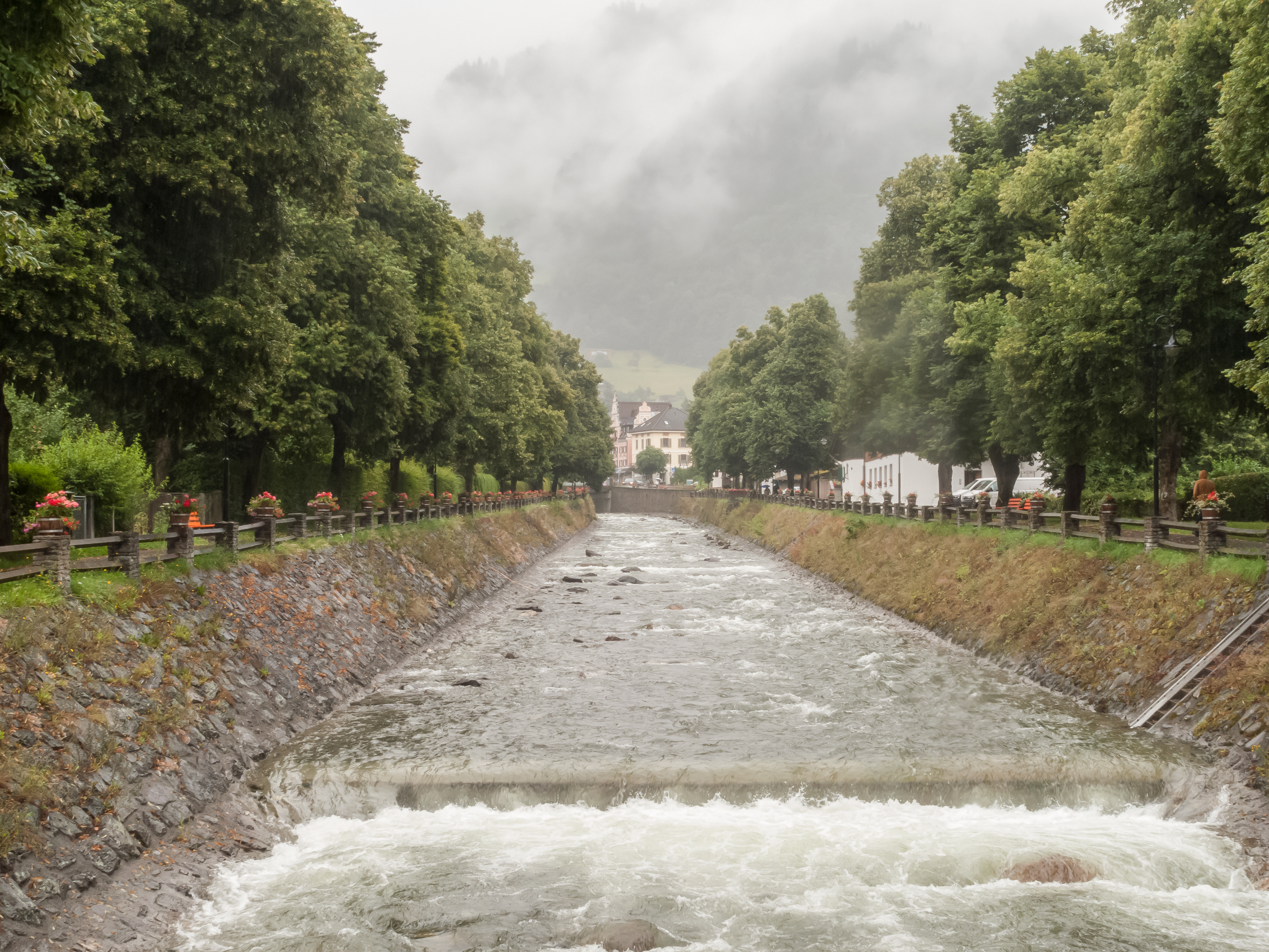
The Litz in Schruns

The Litz is a river of Vorarlberg, Austria.

The Litz has a length of about 22 km (14 mi). It originates from a 7-fold spring near the Alpe Fresch (alpine pasture Fresch) on approximately 1,800 m (5,900 ft) above sea level. Another part of the water comes from the lake Langsee, which seeps subterraneously into the Litz.

In the course of time the Litz created the valley Silbertal in a slightly bellied river course. The Gaflunerbach (length: 6.5 km (4.0 mi)) comes from the valley Gaflunertal and discharges into the Litz from the right. The Litz passes Silbertal, traverses the area of Bartholomäberg and of Schruns, where it finally discharges into the Ill.

== See also ==
- List of rivers of Austria
