= Metnitz (river) =

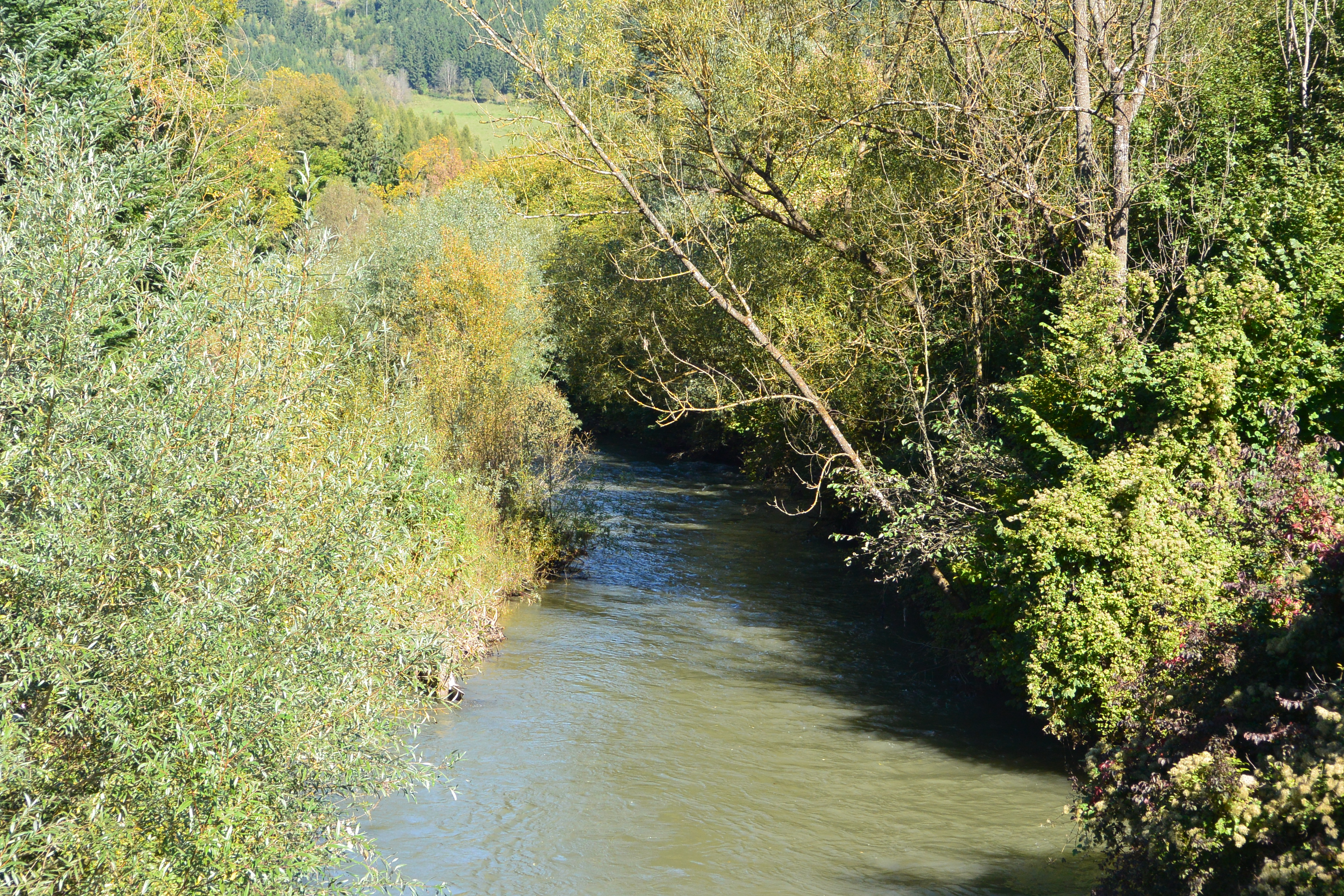

Location
- Country: Austria
- State: Carinthia

Physical characteristics
- Source
  - location: near the Flattnitz Pass
  - coordinates: 46.9425°N 14.0530°E
- Mouth
  - location: north of Althofen into the Gurk
  - coordinates: 46.8908°N 14.4391°E
- Basin size: 471 km^{2} (182 sq mi)

Basin features
- Progression: Gurk→ Drava→ Danube→ Black Sea

Metnitz is a river of Carinthia, Austria.

The Metnitz springs near the Flattnitz Pass. It is a left tributary of the Gurk north of Althofen. Its drainage basin is 471 km^{2} (182 sq mi).
