= Mühlauer Bach =

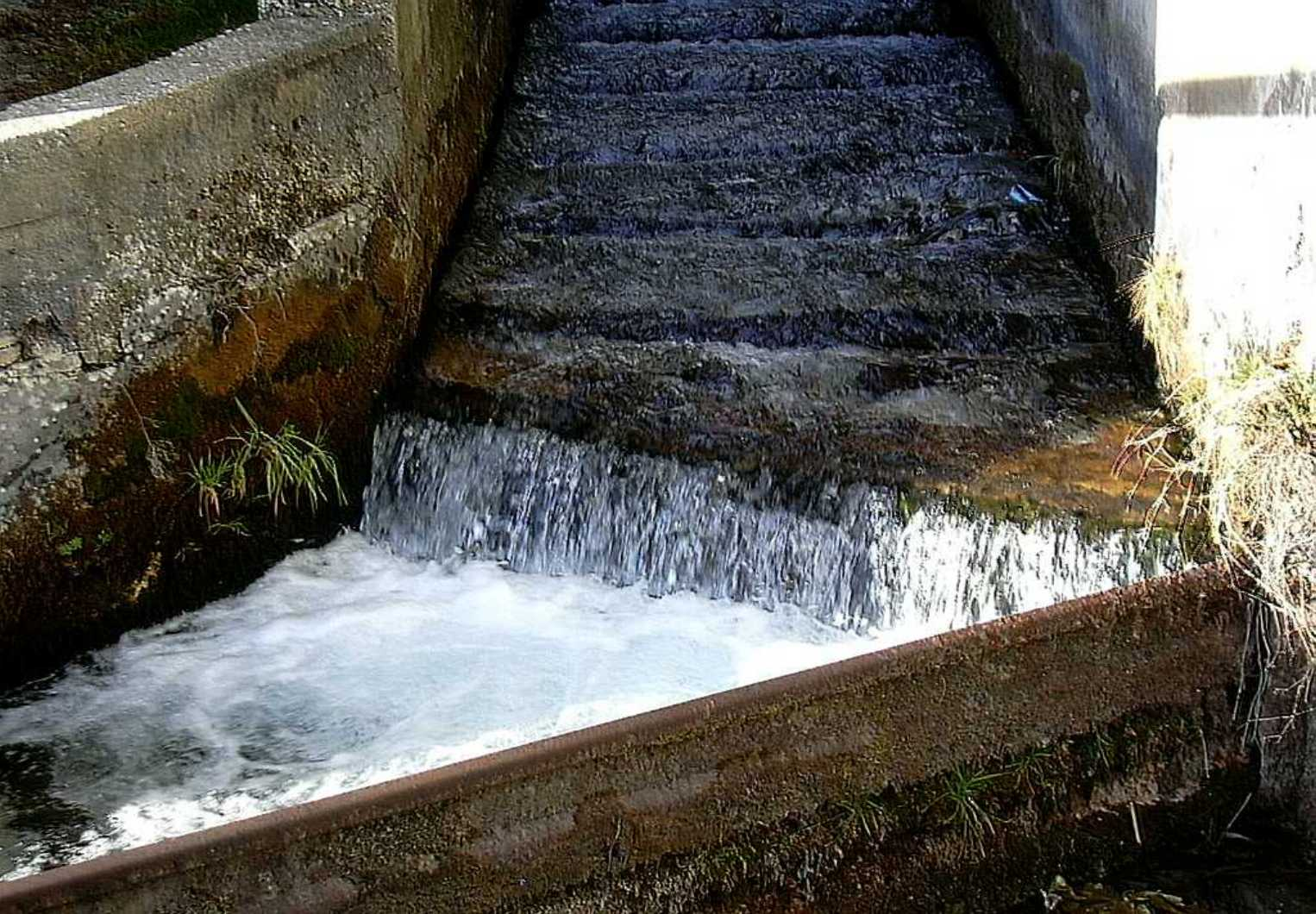
- Bend of river at Mühlau

Location
- Country: Austria
- State: Tyrol

Physical characteristics
- Source
  - location: on the Arzler Reise above Innsbruck
  - elevation: 1,138 m (3,734 ft)
- Mouth
  - location: Inn
  - coordinates: 47.2802°N 11.4107°E
- Length: 2.9 km (1.8 mi)

Basin features
- Progression: Inn→ Danube→ Black Sea

The Mühlauer Bach is a river of Tyrol, Austria. It is a left tributary of the Inn.

The Mühlauer Bach originates at an elevation of 1,138 m (AA) on the Arzler Reise, the cirque below the Arzler Scharte. It flows in southern direction through Mühlau, a district of Innsbruck, where it discharges into the Inn. Next to the Inn, the Mühlauer Bach is the richest flowing waters of the city. It has a length of just under 3 km (1.9 mi). With the exception of the source, it lies in full in the Innsbruck city area.

== Usage ==
The upper course until the Schillersiedlung has Grade A quality. There is also the main water reservoir of the entire city. The Mühlauer Bach is also important for industrial purposes because a power plant in Mühlau provides the nearby commercial district with electricity. In the lower course the quality remains constantly at B even though the service water. Small fish population can be found in the broad sections.

== Myth ==
The end of the gorge Mühlauer Klamm, where the Mühlauer Bach flows, is called "Devil’s pulpit“. It is said that a Tatzelwurm was defeated here and its blood turned into water.
