= Klausbach (Salzach) =

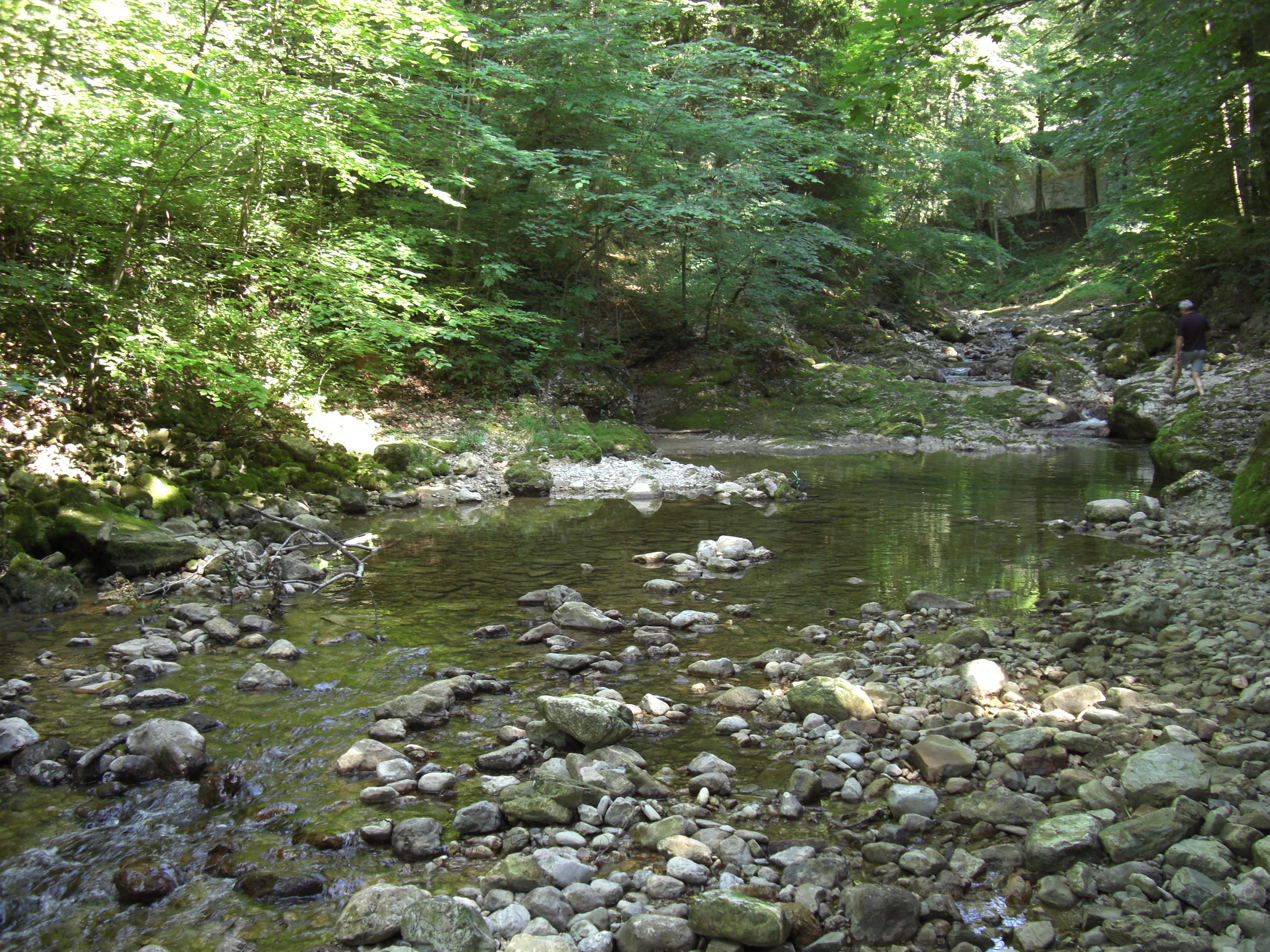
- The Klausbach in the Glasenbachklamm

Location
- Country: Austria
- State: Salzburg

Physical characteristics
- Mouth
  - location: in Elsbethen into the Salzach
  - coordinates: 47°46′01″N 13°04′31″E

Basin features
- Progression: Salzach→ Inn→ Danube→ Black Sea

The Klausbach is a small river of the Austrian state of Salzburg. It discharges from the right into the Salzach in Elsbethen.
