= Almbach (Salzach) =

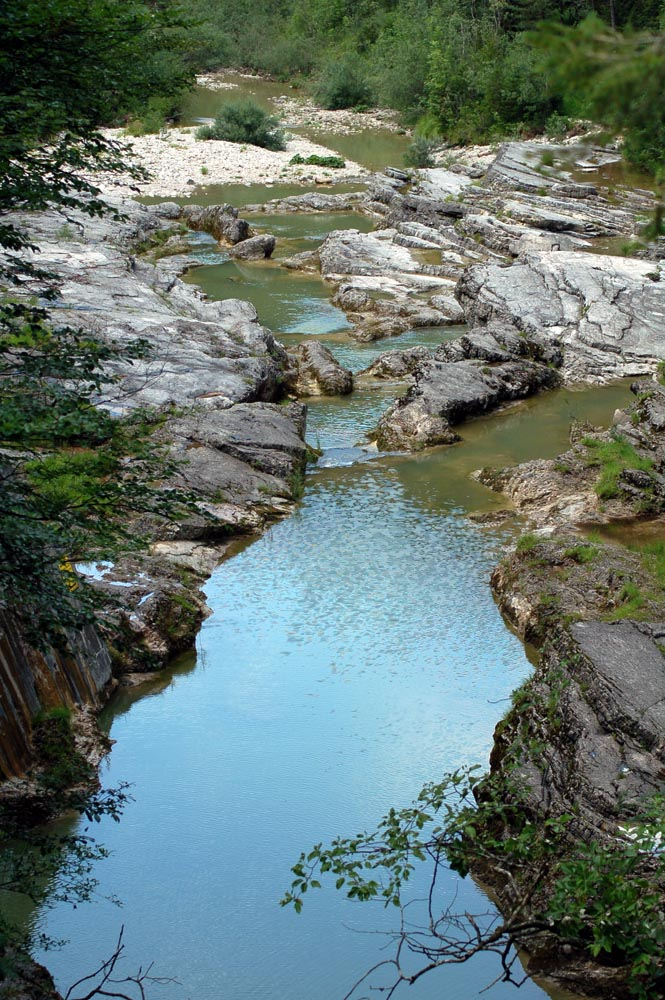
- The Almbach, flowing through the Felsenbad at Faistenau

Location
- Country: Austria
- State: Salzburg

Physical characteristics
- Source
  - location: Lake Hintersee
  - coordinates: 47.7525°N 13.2394°E
- Mouth
  - location: Salzach
  - coordinates: 47.6856°N 13.0944°E
- Length: ~ 17 km (11 mi)

Basin features
- Progression: Salzach→ Inn→ Danube→ Black Sea

The Almbach is a river of the state Salzburg, Austria.

The Almbach is approximately 17 km (11 mi) long. It drains the lake Hintersee. In its middle course it is dammed by the reservoir Wiestalstausee. The river flows into the Salzach at Hallein.
