= Hinterau valley =

Valley in Austria

Hinterautal
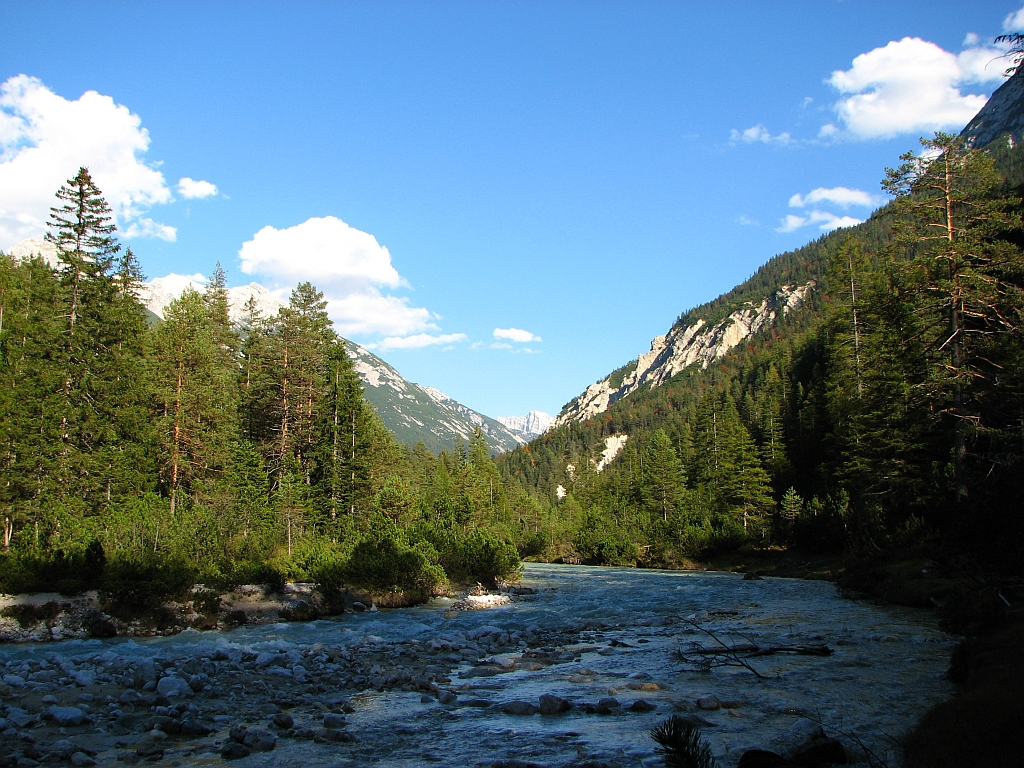
- Isar in Hinterau valley
- Floor elevation: 970 m (3,180 ft) (up to 1,500 m (4,900 ft))
- Length: 14 km (8.7 mi)

Geography
- Location: Tirol, Österreich
- Coordinates: 47°22′33″N 11°22′16″E
- Mountain range: Karwendel
- Traversed by: Isar
- Interactive map of Hinterautal

The Hinterau valley (Rear Meadow Valley, German: Hinterautal) is a valley crossing the Karwendel range from east to west. The Isar has its official source in the Hinterau valley.

The valley stretches from its western end at Scharnitz to its upper eastern end called Rossloch over 14 km from west to east. Starting from Scharnitz the mountain ranges of the Northern Karwendel range and the Hinterautal-Vomp chain limit the valley to the north, just interrupted by the Karwendel valley. To the south the Gleisch-Hall chain limits the valley.

From the western side the valley first is deeply cut into by the waters of river Isar, after that part the valley follows more smoothly to the source of river Isar. After that the valley ends at an alpine bowl called Rossloch.

== Huts ==
After the farms of Scharnizer Alm and Wiesenhof at the western part of the valley there are no more huts until the Kastenalm at the eastern part. From here only the Halleranger hut offers accommodation. All other huts require at least alpine hikes to be reached.

== Activities ==
The valley is closed to public traffic. Due to its length and small average inclination the route to the Kastenalm is a classic Karwendel mountain-bike tour. From the eastern end many Karwendel peaks can be reached, for example the Birkkarspitze from the south. Mountaineers often use mountain-bikes for fast access through the valley.

Kayaking is also common at river Isar in the valley.

== Gallery ==
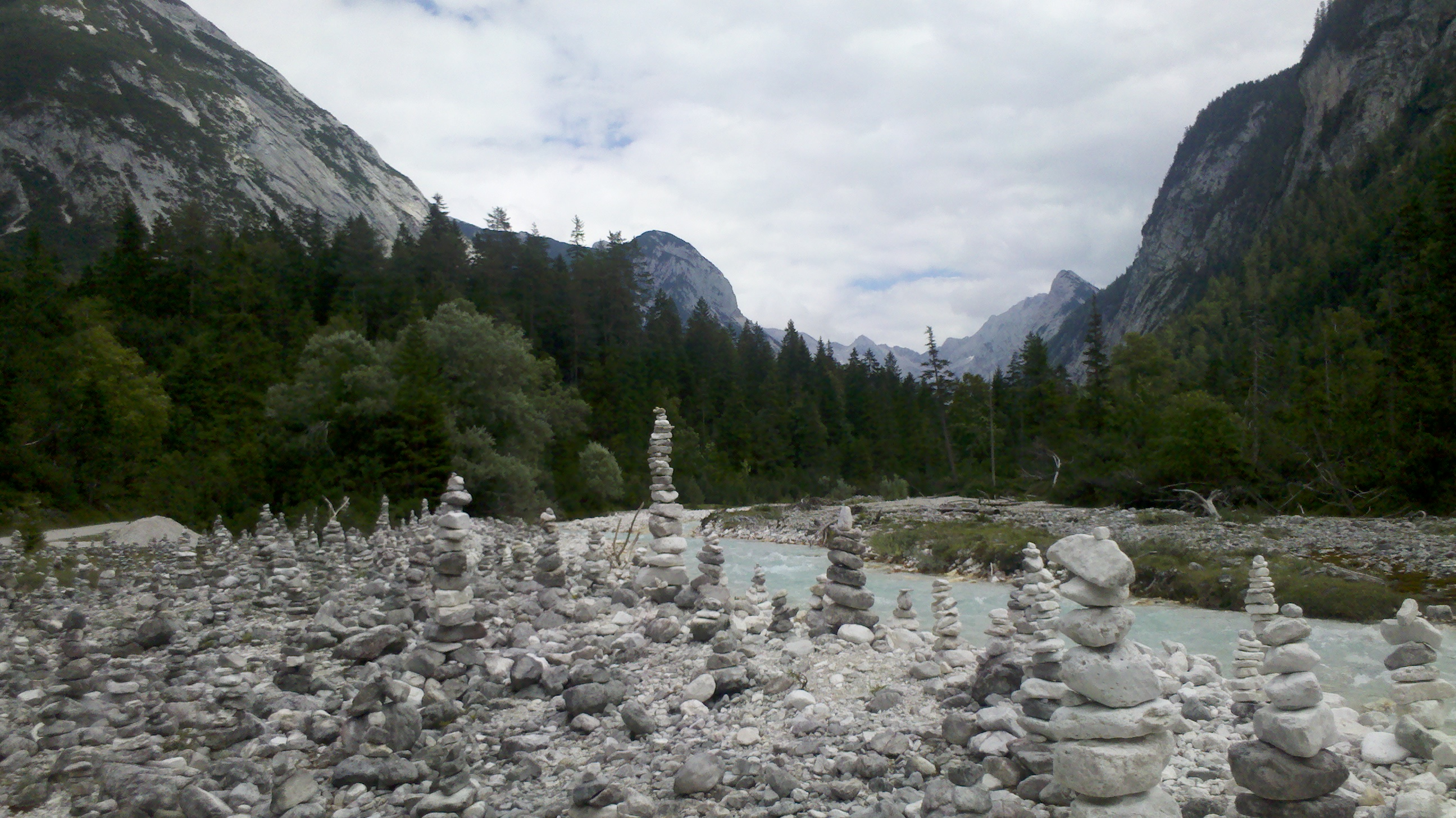
Steinmandl at the Isar

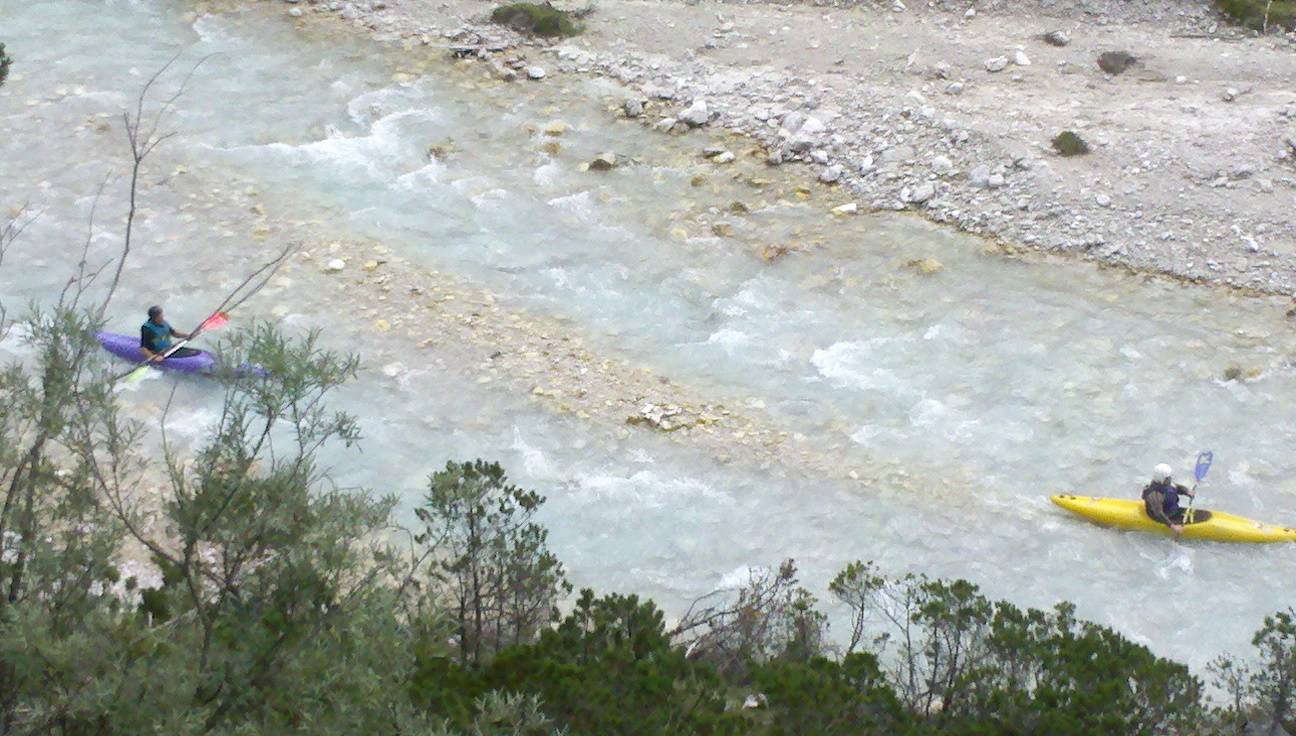
Canoeing the Isar Hinterau valley
