= Pfarrkirchen im Mühlkreis =

- Municipality
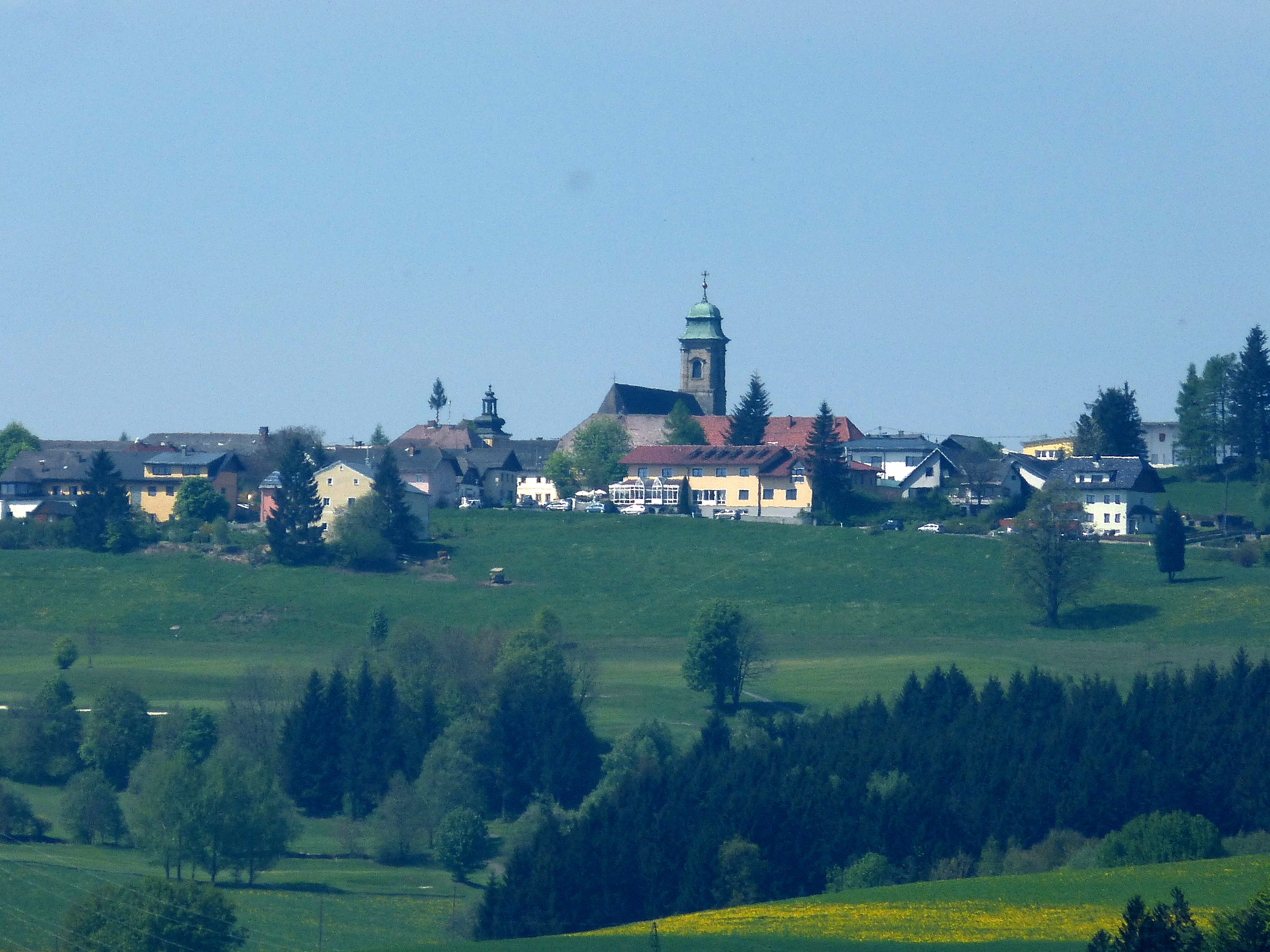

- Coat of arms

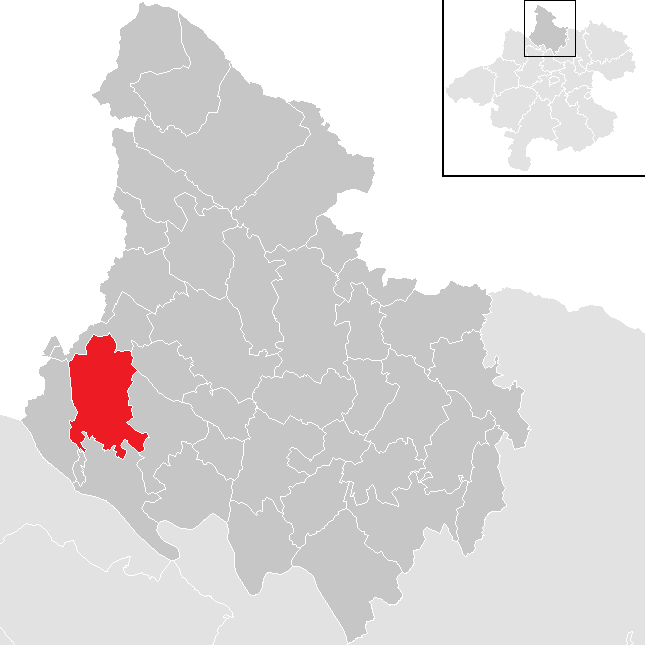
- Location in the district

- Location within Austria
- Coordinates: 48°30′16″N 13°49′32″E
- Country: Austria
- State: Upper Austria
- District: Rohrbach

Government
  - Mayor: Hermann Gierlinger (ÖVP)

Area
  - Total: 31.15 km^{2} (12.03 sq mi)
- Elevation: 819 m (2,687 ft)

Population (2018-01-01)
  - Total: 1,474
  - Density: 47.32/km^{2} (122.6/sq mi)
- Time zone: UTC+1 (CET)
  - Summer (DST): UTC+2 (CEST)
- Postal code: 4141
- Area code: 07285
- Vehicle registration: RO
- Website: www.pfarrkirchen.at

Pfarrkirchen im Mühlkreis is a municipality in the district of Rohrbach in the Austrian state of Upper Austria.

== Population ==
Historical population
Year	Pop.	±%
1869	1,754	—
1880	1,717	−2.1%
1890	1,620	−5.6%
1900	1,485	−8.3%
1910	1,528	+2.9%
1923	1,481	−3.1%
1934	1,485	+0.3%
1939	1,415	−4.7%
1951	1,541	+8.9%
1961	1,462	−5.1%
1971	1,496	+2.3%
1981	1,517	+1.4%
1991	1,512	−0.3%
2001	1,551	+2.6%
2011	1,525	−1.7%
2017	1,479	−3.0%

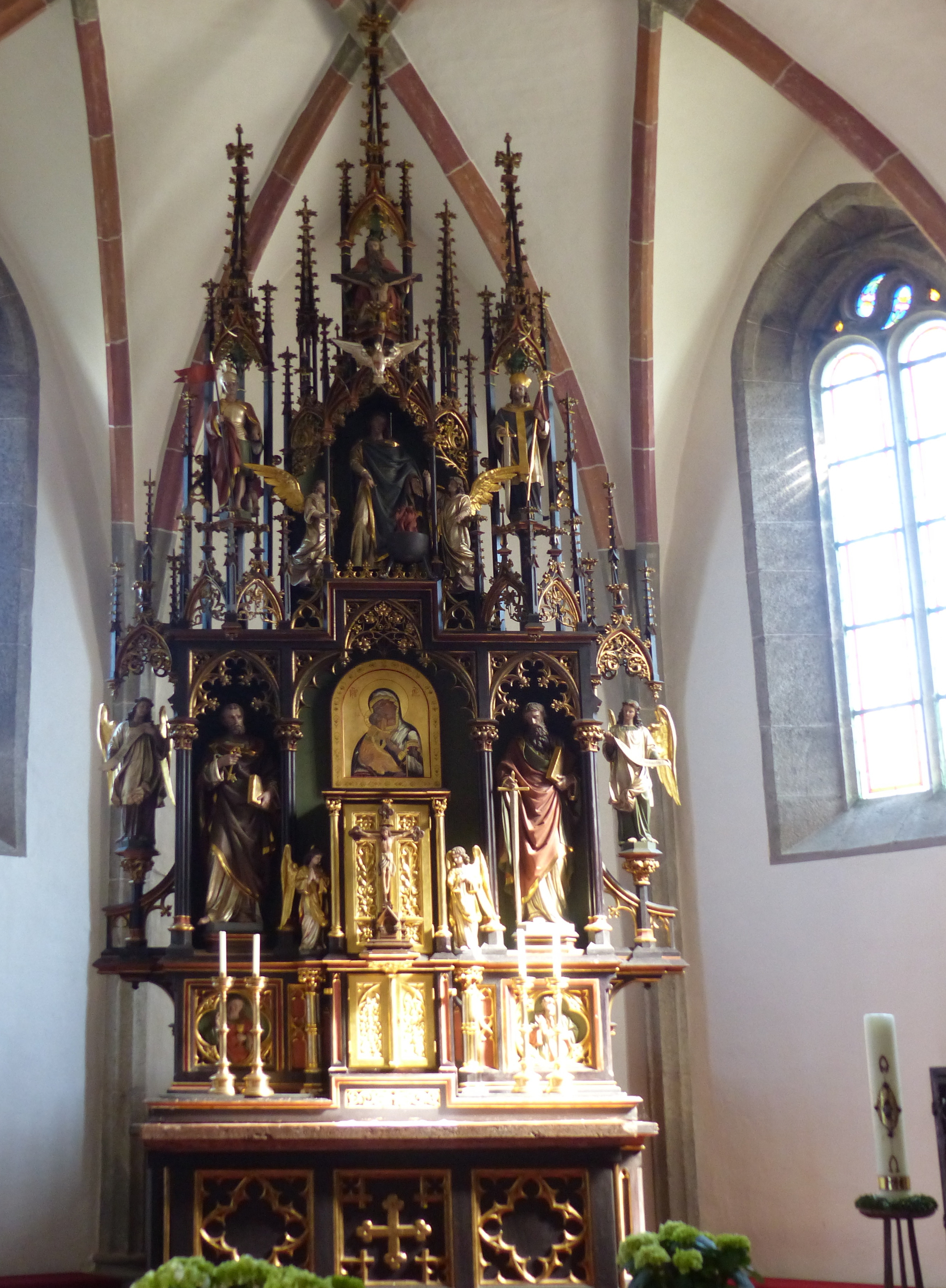
Municipality's Gothic Revival high altar (1911) at the Saint Vitus Parish Church by Ludwig Linzinger
