= Lohbach (Inn) =

Lohbach Gießenbach
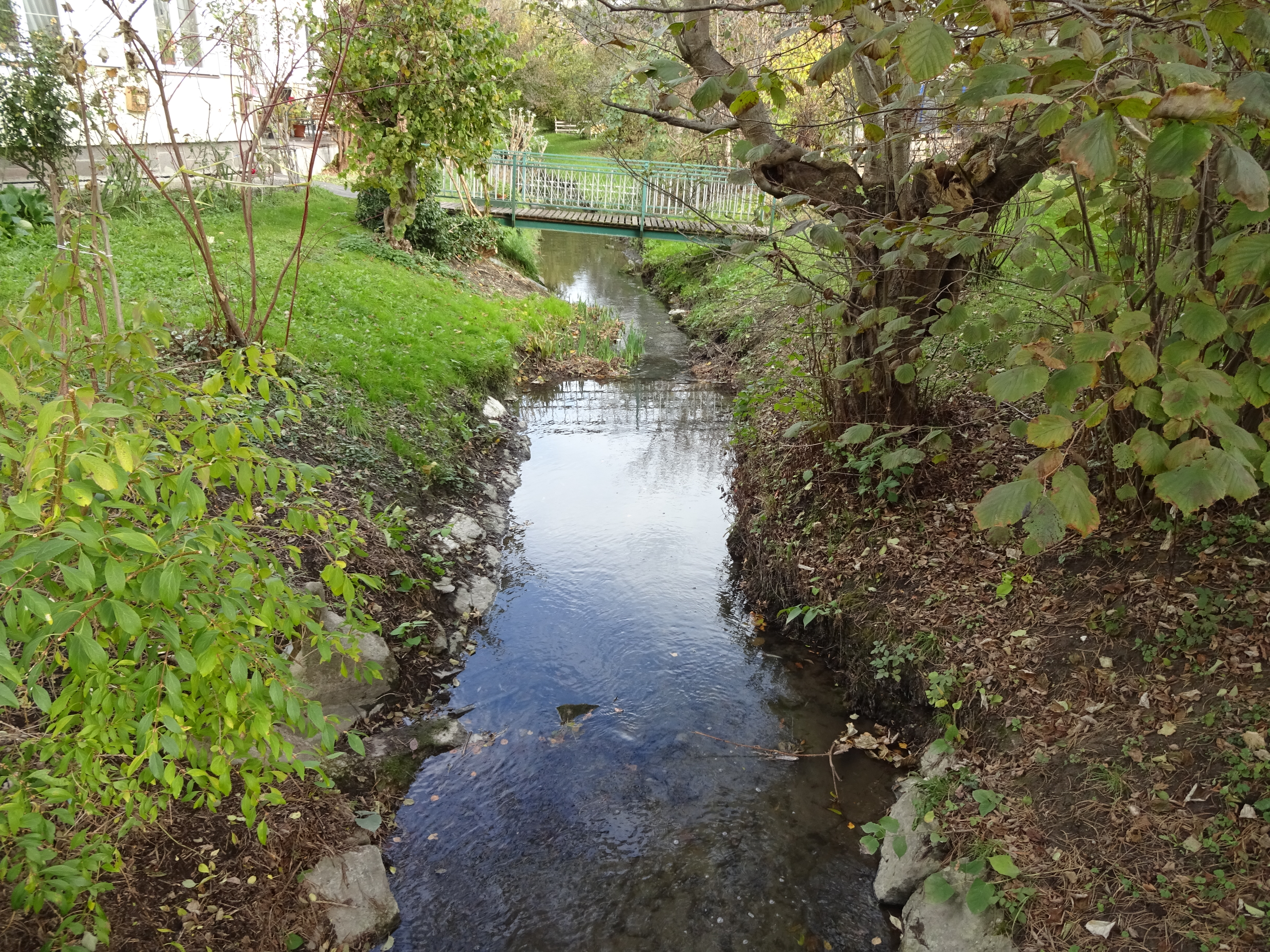

Location
- Country: Austria
- State: Tyrol

Physical characteristics
- Source
  - location: Near Kranebitten
- Mouth
  - location: Inn at University bridge of Innsbruck
  - coordinates: 47.2658°N 11.3853°E
- Length: 4.5 km (2.8 mi)

Basin features
- Progression: Inn→ Danube→ Black Sea

The Lohbach (in its lower range Gießenbach) is a river of Tyrol, Austria, in the municipal area of Innsbruck, a tributary of the Inn.

The Lohbach originates from a spring at the eastern edge of the Kranebitter ravine. It runs in eastern direction along Hötting-West and Lohbachsiedlung, further to Vögelebichl. At the street Fischerhäuslweg its name changes to Gießenbach and it runs under ground until it discharges into the Inn. A part of the river branches off and flows into the airport area. The length of the Lohbach is 4.5 kilometres (2.8 mi).
