= Sonnen =

- Municipality
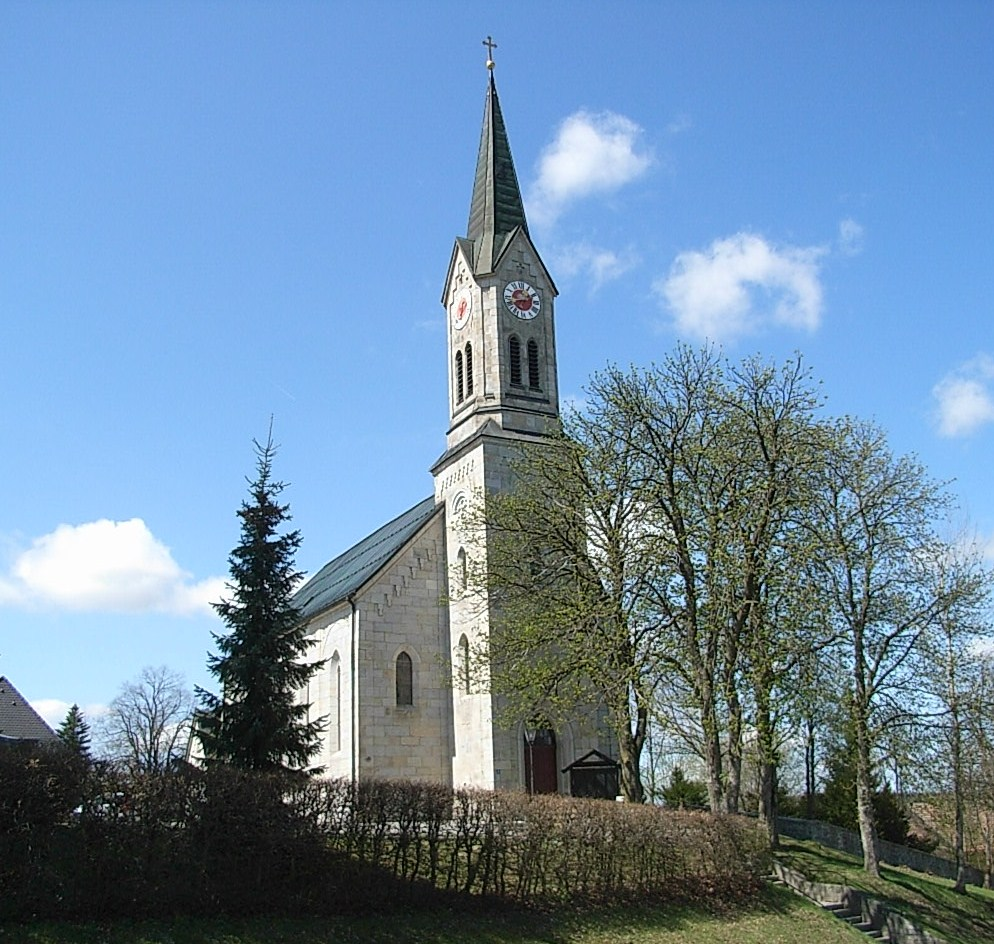
- Church of the Assumption of the Virgin Mary

- Coat of arms

- Location of Sonnen within Passau district
- Interactive map of Sonnen
- Location within Germany Location within Bavaria
- Coordinates: 48°41′N 13°43′E
- Country: Germany
- State: Bavaria
- Admin. region: Niederbayern
- District: Passau

Government
  - Mayor (2020–26): Klaus Weidinger (CSU)

Area
  - Total: 16.48 km^{2} (6.36 sq mi)
- Elevation: 836 m (2,743 ft)

Population (2025-12-31)
  - Total: 1,432
  - Density: 86.89/km^{2} (225.1/sq mi)
- Time zone: UTC+01:00 (CET)
  - Summer (DST): UTC+02:00 (CEST)
- Postal codes: 94164
- Dialling codes: 08584
- Vehicle registration: PA
- Website: www.gemeinde-sonnen.de

Sonnen (German pronunciation: [ˈzɔnən]) is a small municipality in the district of Passau in Bavaria in Germany. It is located in the Danube forest, lower Bavarian forest and is located mostly in the district Passau at a height of 700 to 900 meters. Sonnen lies 28 km from Passau, 9 km from Hauzenberg and from the forest itself 13 km. Sonnen borders with upper Austria which lies only 8 km away.

Sonnen has been able to possess a rather secured boundary since the Middle Ages. Max Heuwieser writes in "The Tradition of Passau", that Sonnen received its official name somewhere between the years 1130AD and 1150AD by Baron Von Falkenstein.

Sonnen was settled in Bavaria, Passau district, at the end of a trade-route from Vienna, Austria. Gustav Wasmayrs in his "History of the Market Ulrichsberg" writes, "in the document over the award of market privileges, King the Heinrich IV plans on 11/07/1349 to secure a free road issued after Passau. This road, coming from upper plan, will lead from upper Austria to Bavaria's sunny mountain town of Sonnen."

The village now boasts unique natural energy systems, being nearly fully solar powered.

== The Sonnen Crest ==
Due to this historical past of the Sun in the description of the coat of arms, the Sonnen municipality describes the crest in this manner: In green, a silver bar with a flying silver falcon above, and a silver horseshoe below, justifies the meaning of this emblem: The falcon is taken from the coat of arms of Baron Von Falkenstein, who exercised ruled over the Sonnen municipality during the high Middle Ages. The silver bar symbolizes the important road connection between Austria and Bavaria. The horseshoe denotes the merchant trade route traveled by loaded horse and caravan. The green background speaks to the times before the old-growth forest landscape surrounding Sonnen was deforested.
