= Strassen, Tyrol =

Strassen
- Municipality
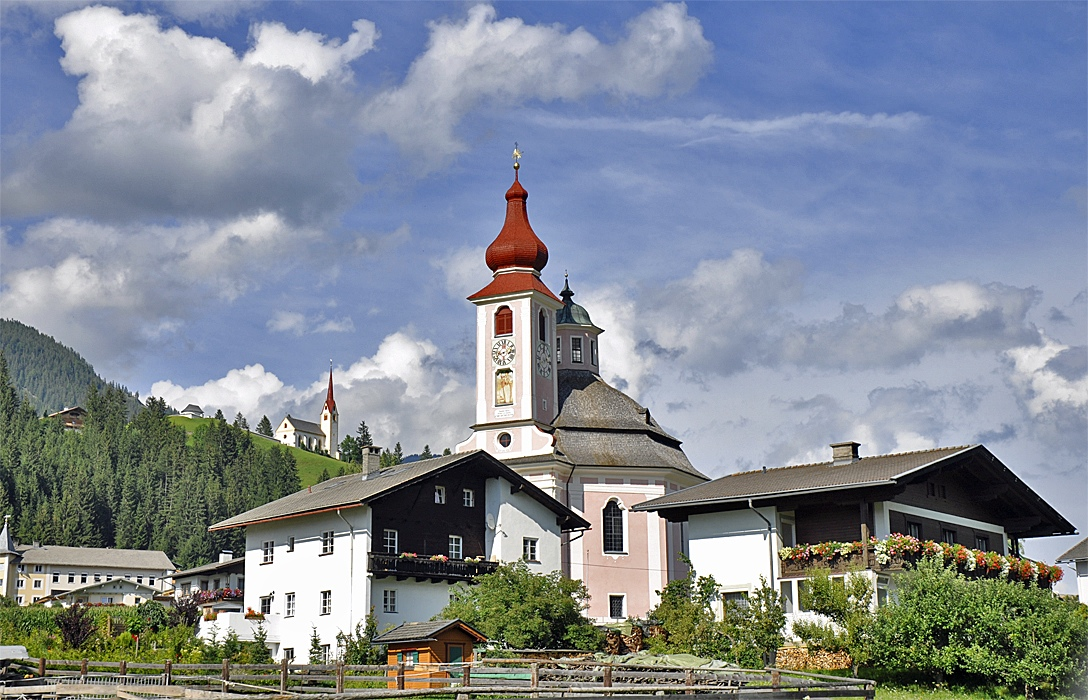
- Holy Trinity Church and Saint James Church (in the background) in Strassen

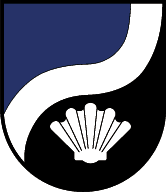
- Coat of arms

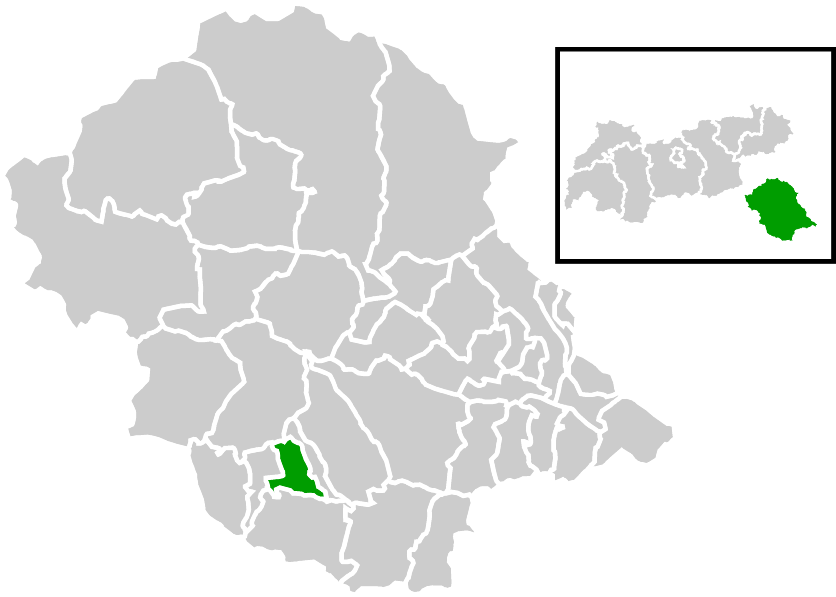
- Location within Lienz district

- Location within Austria
- Coordinates: 46°44′58″N 12°29′17″E
- Country: Austria
- State: Tyrol
- District: Lienz

Government
  - Mayor: Franz Webhofer

Area
  - Total: 17.04 km^{2} (6.58 sq mi)
- Elevation: 1,099 m (3,606 ft)

Population (2018-01-01)
  - Total: 808
  - Density: 47.4/km^{2} (123/sq mi)
- Time zone: UTC+1 (CET)
  - Summer (DST): UTC+2 (CEST)
- Postal code: 9918
- Area code: 04846
- Vehicle registration: LZ
- Website: www.gemeinde-strassen.at

Strassen (German pronunciation: [ˈʃtʁasn̩]) is a municipality in the district of Lienz in the Austrian state of Tyrol.

== Geography ==
Strassen has scattered settlements that lie either on the valley floor or on the sunny side of the valley.
