= Tyrol Schistose Alps =

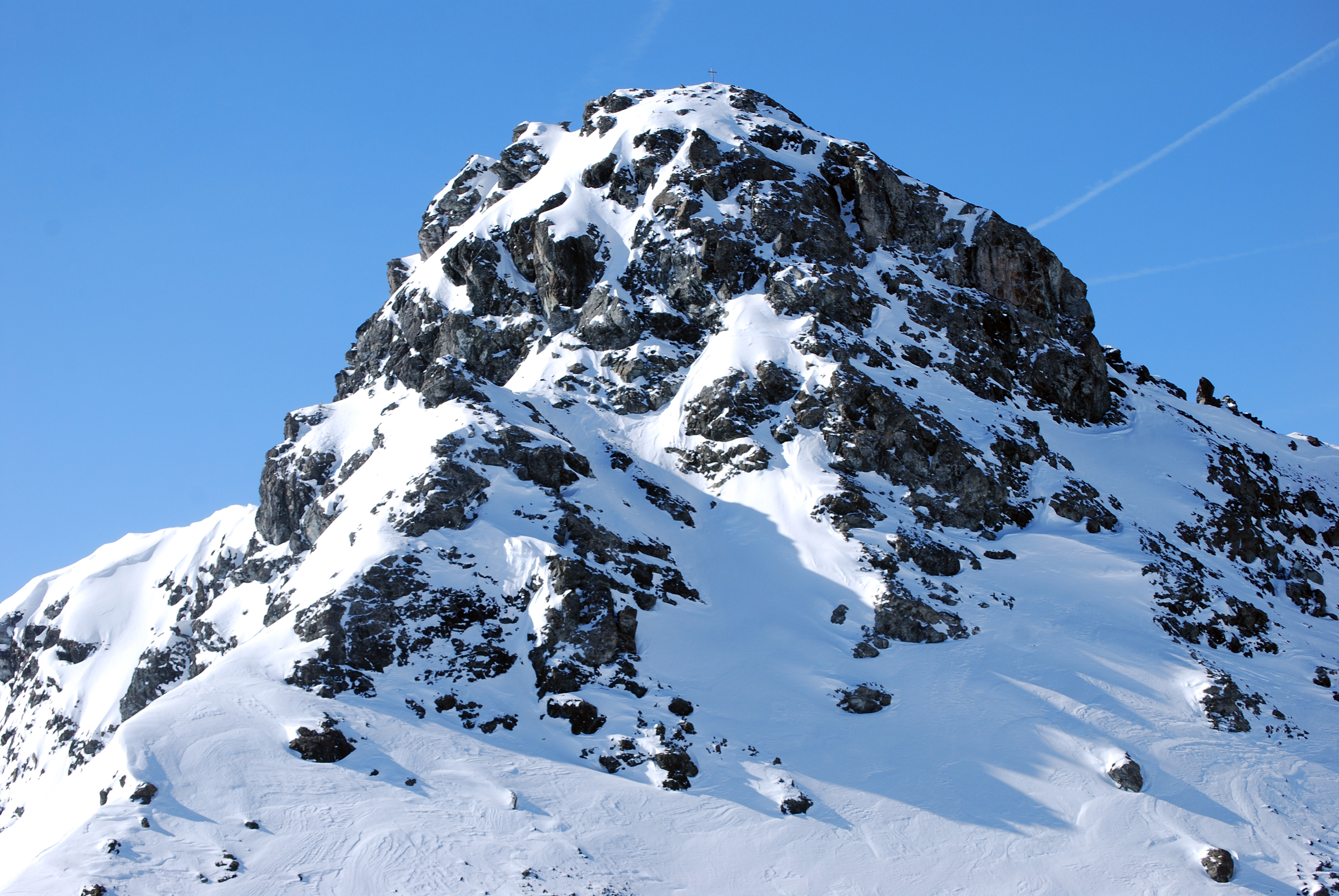
- Lizumer Reckner from North

Highest point
- Peak: Lizumer Reckner
- Elevation: 2,886 m (9,469 ft)
- Coordinates: 47°08′39″N 11°37′50″E

Naming
- Native name: Tiroler Schieferalpen (German)

Geography
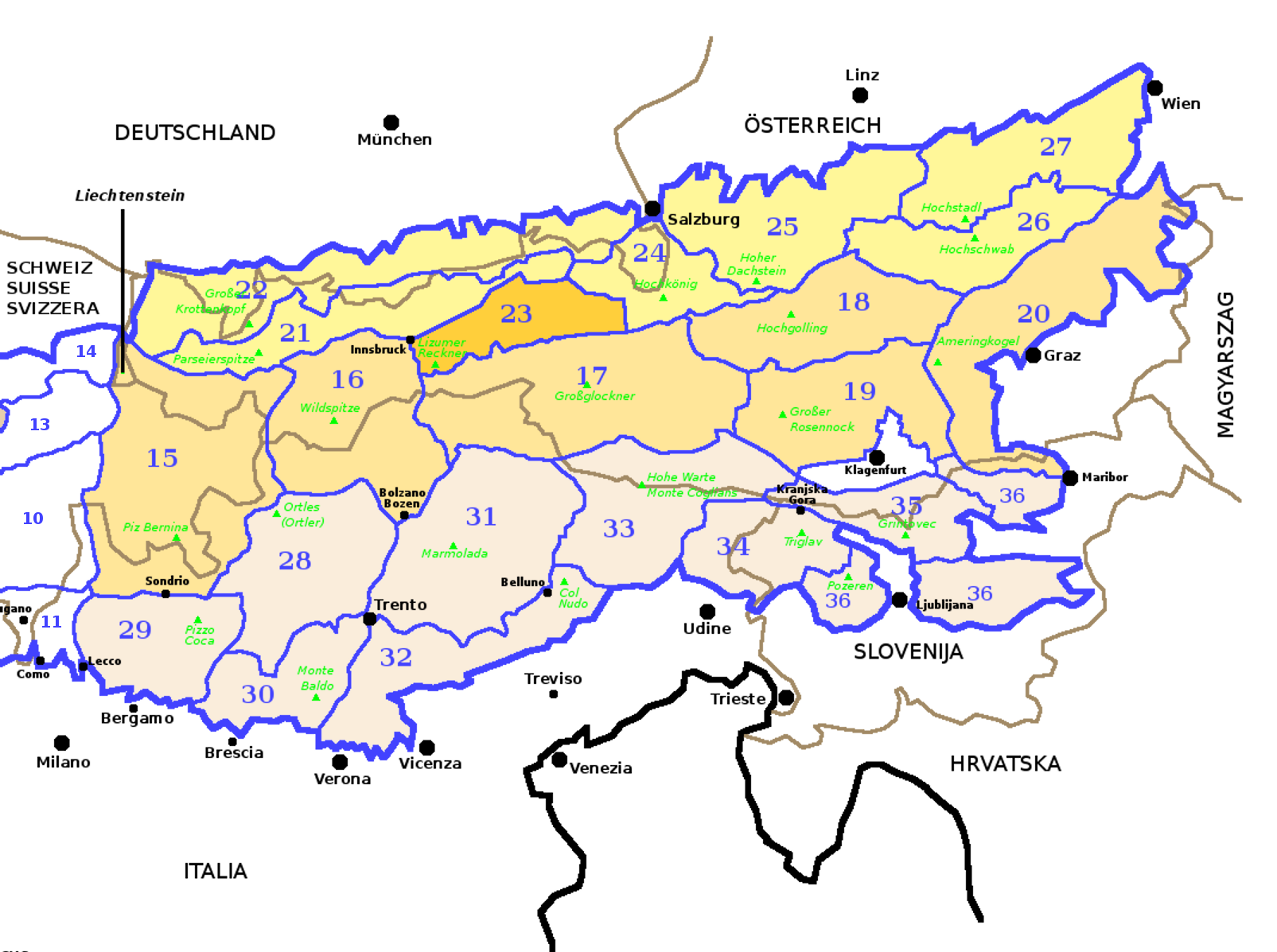
- Tyrol Schistose Alps (section nr.23) within Eaestern Alps
- Country: Austria
- States of Austria: Salzburg, Tyrol
- Parent range: Alps
- Borders on: North Tyrol Limestone Alps, Bavarian Alps, Northern Salzburg Alps, Western Tauern Alps and Eastern Rhaetian Alps

Geology
- Orogeny: Alpine orogeny
- Rock type: Sedimentary rocks

The Tyrol Schistose Alps (Tiroler Schieferalpen in German) is the proposed name for a subdivision of mountain ranges in a new, and as yet unadopted, classification of the Alps, located in Austria.

== Geography ==
Administratively the range belongs to the Austrian state of Tyrol and, marginally, of Salzburg. The whole range is drained by the tributaries of the Danube river.

=== SOIUSA classification ===
According to SOIUSA (International Standardized Mountain Subdivision of the Alps) the mountain range is an Alpine section, classified in the following way:

- main part = Eastern Alps
- major sector = Northern Limestone Alps
- section = Tyrol Schistose Alps
- code = II/B-23

=== Subdivision ===
The range is divided in two Alpine subsections:

- Tux Alps (DE:Tuxer Alpen) - SOIUSA code:II/B-23.I;
- Kitzbühel Alps (DE:Kitzbüheler Alpen) - SOIUSA code:II/B-23.II.

== Notable summits ==
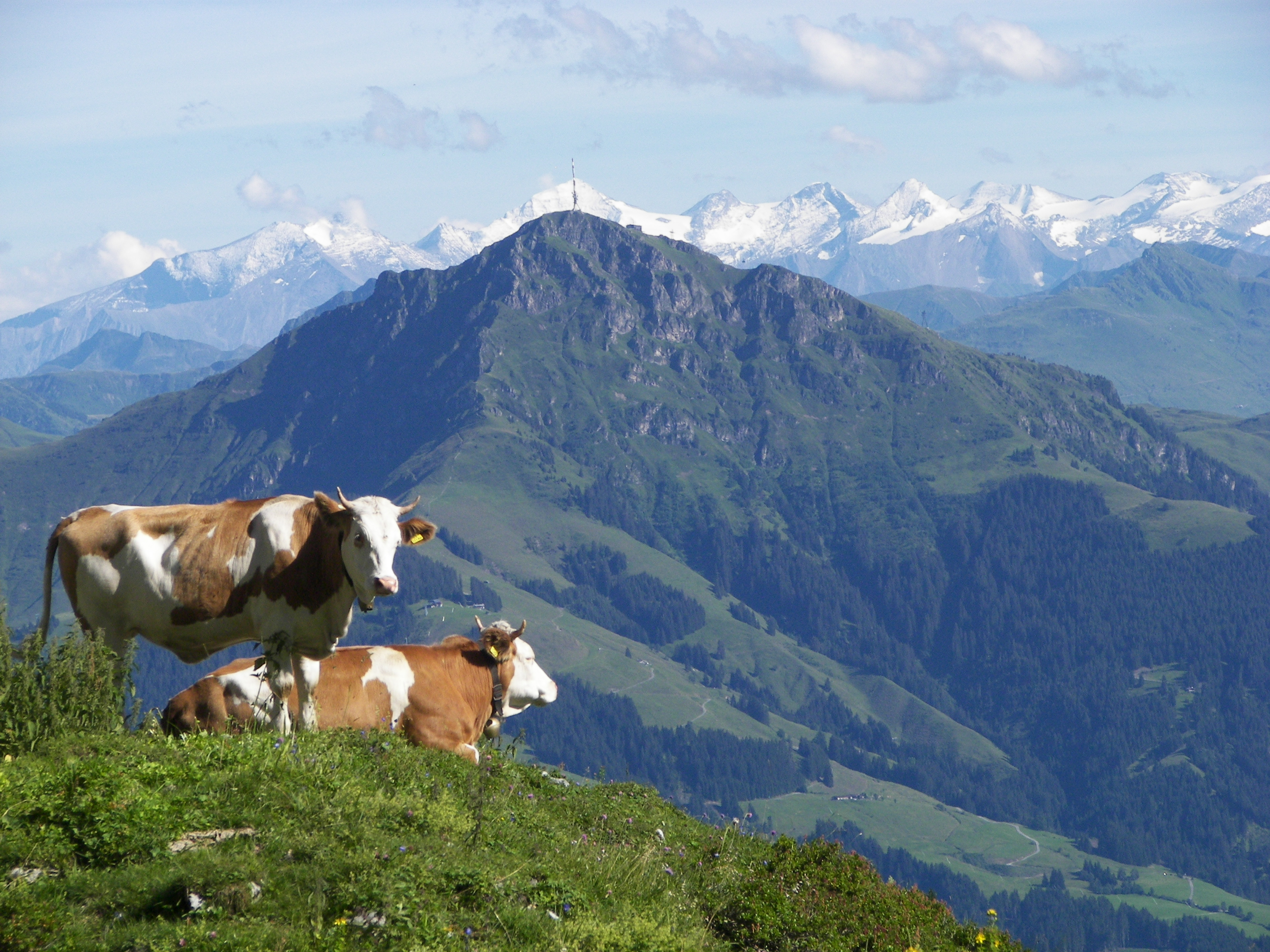
Kitzbüheler Horn, in the Kitzbühel Alps

Some notable summits of the range are:

Name	metres	feet
Lizumer Reckner	2,886	9,469
Glungezer	2,677	8,783
Kreuzjoch	2,588	8,392
Torhelm	2,494	8,182
Salzachgeier	2,469	8,100
Großer Galtenberg	2,424	7,953
Kellerjoch	2,344	7,690
Patscherkofel	2,246	7,369
Kitzbüheler Horn	1,996	6,549
