= Geier (Tux Alps) =

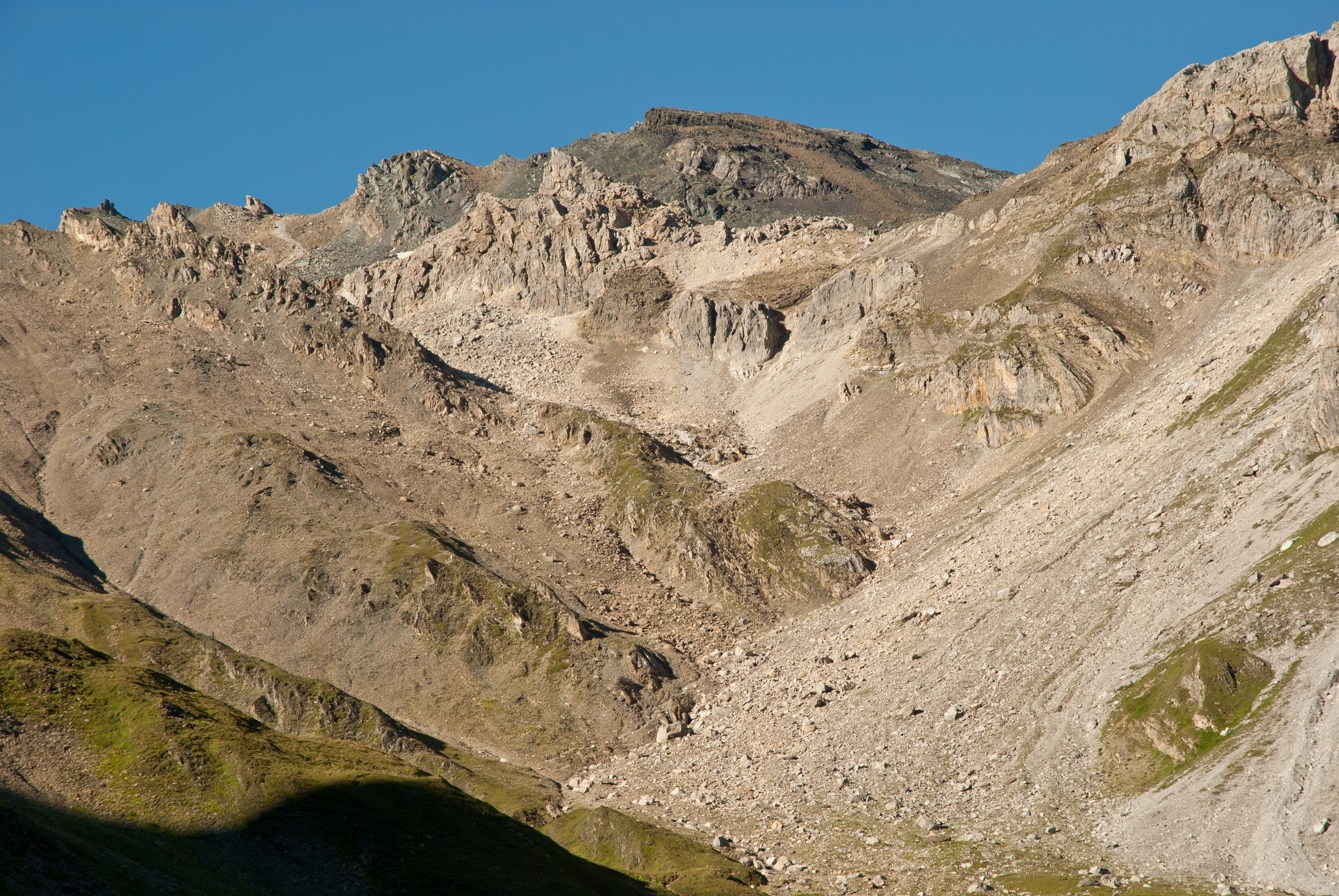
- The Geier from the northeast

Highest point
- Elevation: 2,857 m (AA) (9,373 ft)
- Coordinates: 47°8′24″N 11°37′58″E

Geography
- Location within Austria
- Location: Tyrol, Austria
- Parent range: Tux Alps

Geology
- Mountain type: rock summit
- Rock type: serpentinite

The Geier, at 2,857 m above sea level (AA), is the second highest mountain in the Tux Alps in the Austrian state of Tyrol.

The Geier lies in the center of the Tux Alps, where the south-west Schmirntal, the west Navistal, the east Tuxer Tal and the north Wattental come together. 450 meters north of the Geier lies the much more rugged Lizumer Reckner, the highest mountain in the Tux Alps. About 400 meters southeast of the Geier at about 2660 m is the Junssee, which is about 200 by 100 meters in size. With the exception of the south-west flank, the Geier belongs to the Lizum-Walchen military training area. Like the Lizumer Reckner, it can also be climbed from all four adjacent valleys. From the Lizumer Hütte in the Wattental, it is often climbed as a ski tour, even in winter. At the summit of the Geier there is a tin vulture, based on the name of the mountain.

== Geology ==
The summit area is mainly composed of serpentinites of the Reckner complex, mainly lherzolites, with subordinate harzburgites and dunites. The Reckner complex consists of former oceanic crust, so-called ophiolites. The Reckner Complex is located in the border area between the Lower East Alps in the north and the Tauern Window in the south and is assigned to either the Penninic or the Lower East Alps.

== History ==
The 2016 Geier avalanche took place at this mountain.
