= 2016 Geier avalanche =

Avalanche in Austria

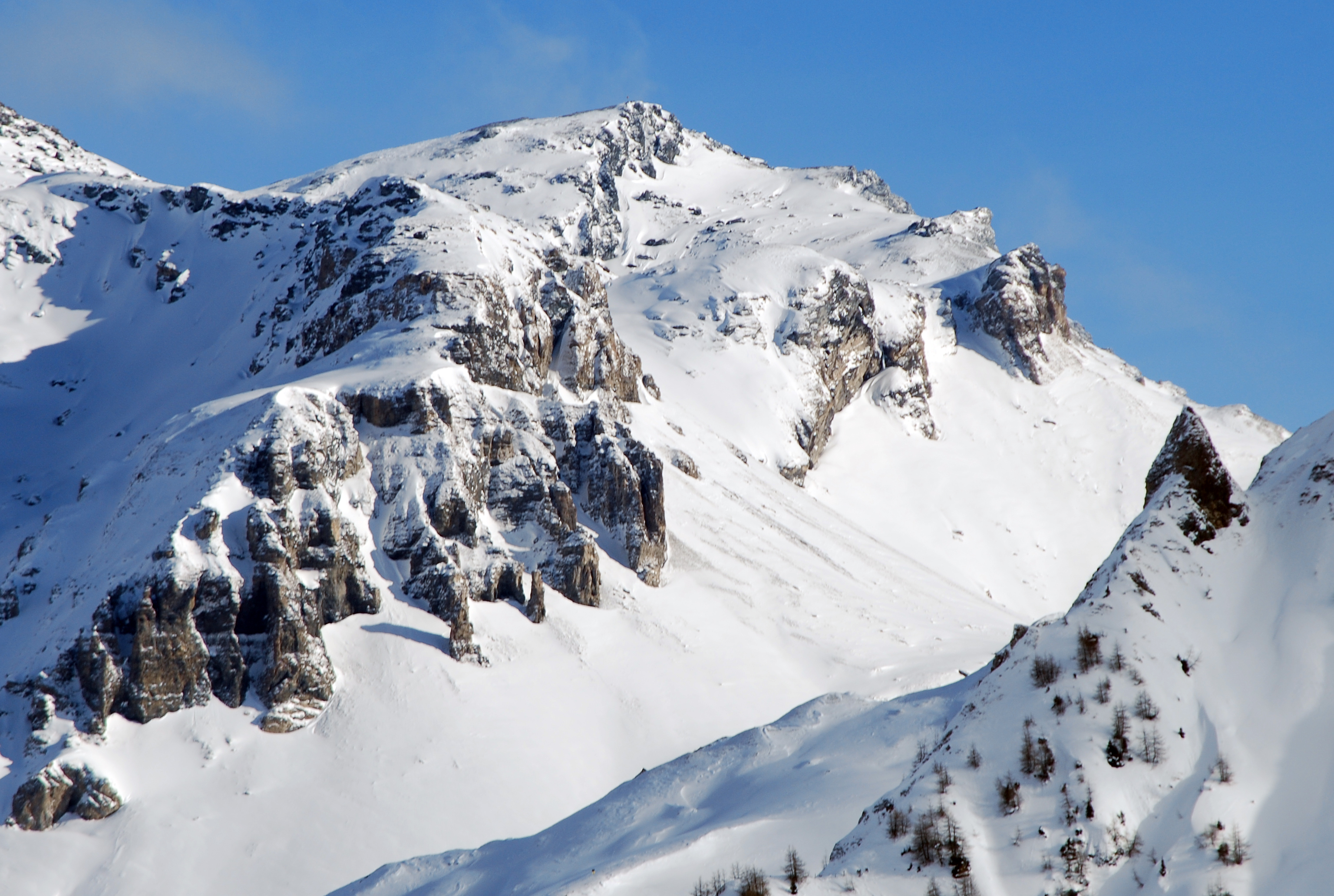
Geier as seen from the northwest

The 2016 Geier avalanche was an avalanche which occurred in Wattenberg, Austria, on 6 February 2016. Five people were killed (all Czechs), when the disaster struck in the 2,800-metre (9,200 ft) Geier mountain range. The avalanche occurred shortly after midday near the mountain hut Lizumer Hütte. This was one of 19 avalanches reported in Tyrol on 6 February. The avalanche risk level in Tyrol was three out of a possible five, deemed "considerable".

== Avalanche ==
The avalanche spread over a 2 km wide area, in the Wattental Valley in the Western Apline region of Tirol, burying 17 skiers from the Czech Republic who were taking part in a "free ride camp" and had been previously warned about the danger of an avalanche by locals. Martin Waldhart of Mountain Rescue stated at a press conference that the group had been skiing in an area that had been classified as an "absolute risk zone". Resucue workers used dogs and helicopters to search for the groups and at the time of locating them, some of the skiers had already freed themselves.

== Victims ==
There were two ski groups from the Czech Republic caught up in the snowslide, including two guides. The avalanche killed 5 skiers of the parties, and injured two, with the remaining members of the party uninjured. There were no other fatalities, but several people were reported injured.
