= Lizumer Reckner =

Highest mountain in the Tux Alps

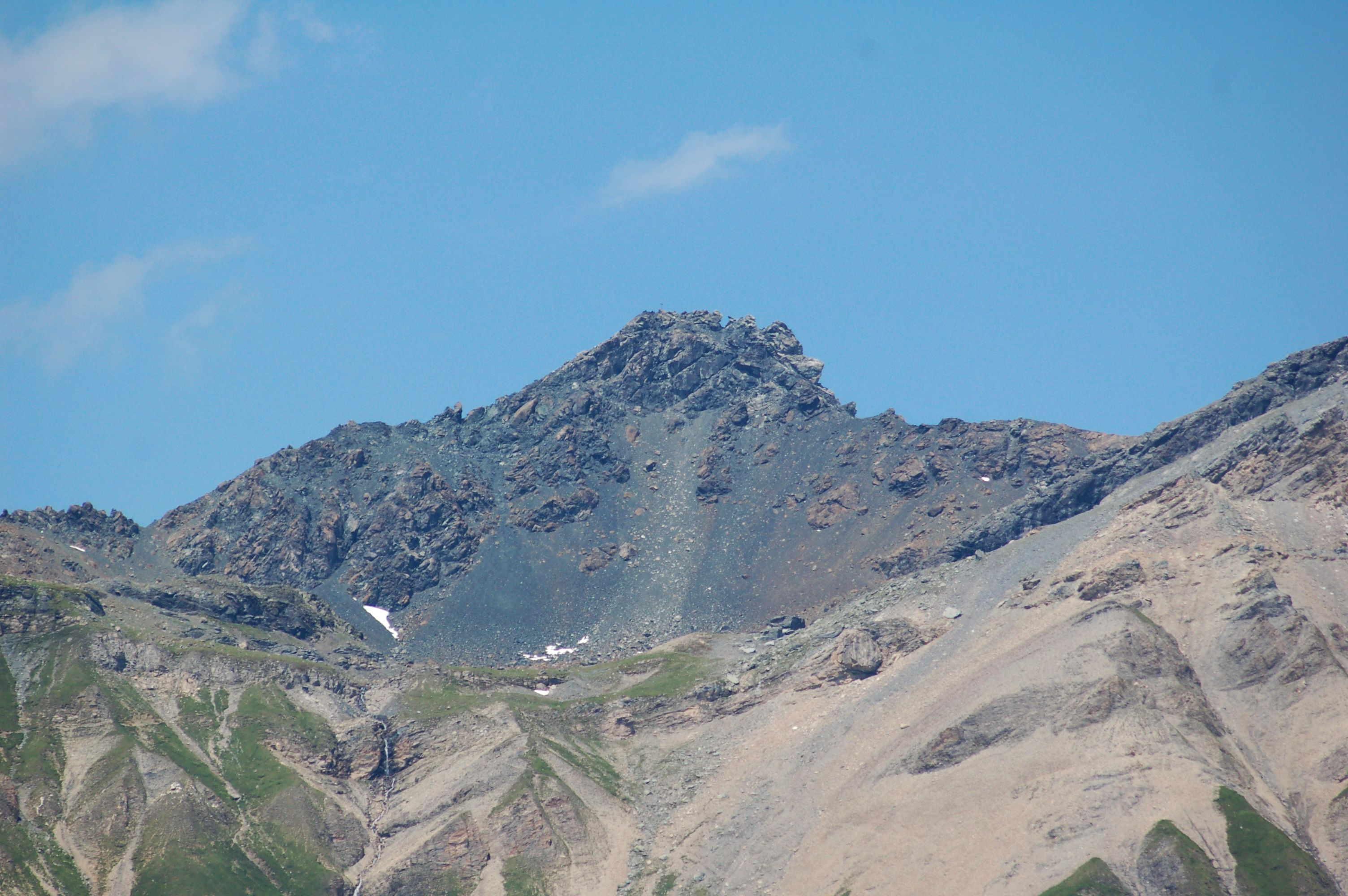
- The Lizumer Reckner from the south

Highest point
- Elevation: 2,886 m (AA) (9,469 ft)
- Coordinates: 47°08′39″N 11°37′50″E

Geography
- Location within Austria
- Location: Tyrol, Austria
- Parent range: Tux Alps

Geology
- Mountain type: rock summit
- Rock type: serpentinite

The Lizumer Reckner is, at 2,886 m above sea level (AA), the highest mountain in the Tux Alps in the Austrian state of Tyrol.

== Location and area ==
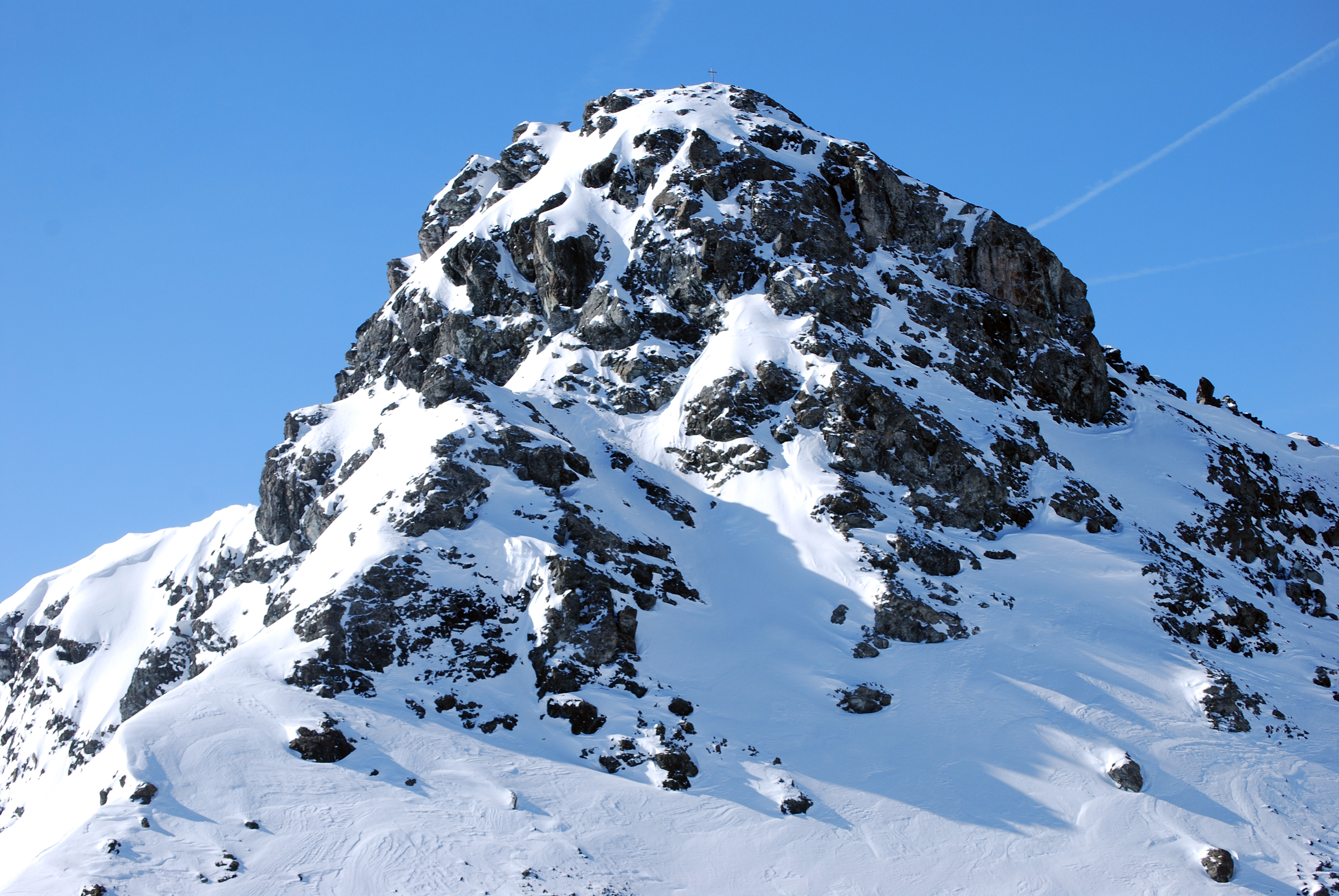
The Lizumer Reckner from the north

The Lizumer Reckner lies in the centre of the Tux Alps, about 20 kilometres southeast of Innsbruck within the Lizum Walchen Training Area (Truppenübungsplatz Lizum Walchen). To the west lies the Navis valley, to the southeast the Schmirn valley and to the east the Wattener Lizum. The Tuxertal valley lies not far to the southeast. Its neighbouring mountain to the south is the Geier. To the north a mountain crest runs to the Lizumer Sonnenspitze, the Tarntaler Köpfe and eventually as far as the Mölsberg. To the west of the Lizumer Reckner is the 2,824 m high Naviser Reckner (47°08′39″N 11°37′27″E).

== Geology ==
The Reckner lies on the edge of the Tauern window, a region of the Eastern Alps, in which Penninic nappes and possibly also Helvetic nappes are exposed. The summit block of the Reckner consists of serpentinite, which is mainly embedded in radiolarite. Furthermore, in the geologically diverse surrounding area dolomite breccias, kalkschiefer and other rocks of the Jurassic period.

Below the summit block of the Reckner there are stone runs, that are seen as the remains of a former rock glacier. Traces of dead ice may also be found here.

== Bases and trails ==
From the Navis valley the mountain may be climbed inter alia from the hut Naviser Hütte (1,767 m) or the Peeralm (1,663 m). In the Schmirn valley the hamlet of Obern acts as a departure point. From the Tuxertal the Reckner can be ascended from the 1,984 m high Junsbergalm or from Hintertux. The most important base in the Wattener Lizum is the hut Lizumer Hütte (2,019 m).

The southern foot of the summit block can be reached from all these bases over a number of marked hiking trails. The climb from the Lizum is also possible in winter as a ski tour. The final climb to the summit requires some easy climbing and is partly secured as a Klettersteig.

Due to its location within the military training area, ascents of the mountain are banned from time to time.

== Sources ==
Sepp Brandl, Gerhard Hirtlreiter (2006), Kitzbüheler Alpen, Tuxer und Zillertaler Alpen: Brixental, Spertental, Windau, Kelchsau, Wildschönau, Alpbachtal, Zillertal, Tuxer Tal, Hochfügen, Weerberg, Wattener Lizum : 50 Skitouren im Tiroler Unterland, zwischen Inntal und Pass Thurn, Hochfügen und Gerlos (in German), Bergverlag Rother, p. 95, ISBN 978-3-7633-5910-3
