= Lizumer Hütte =

Alpine club hut

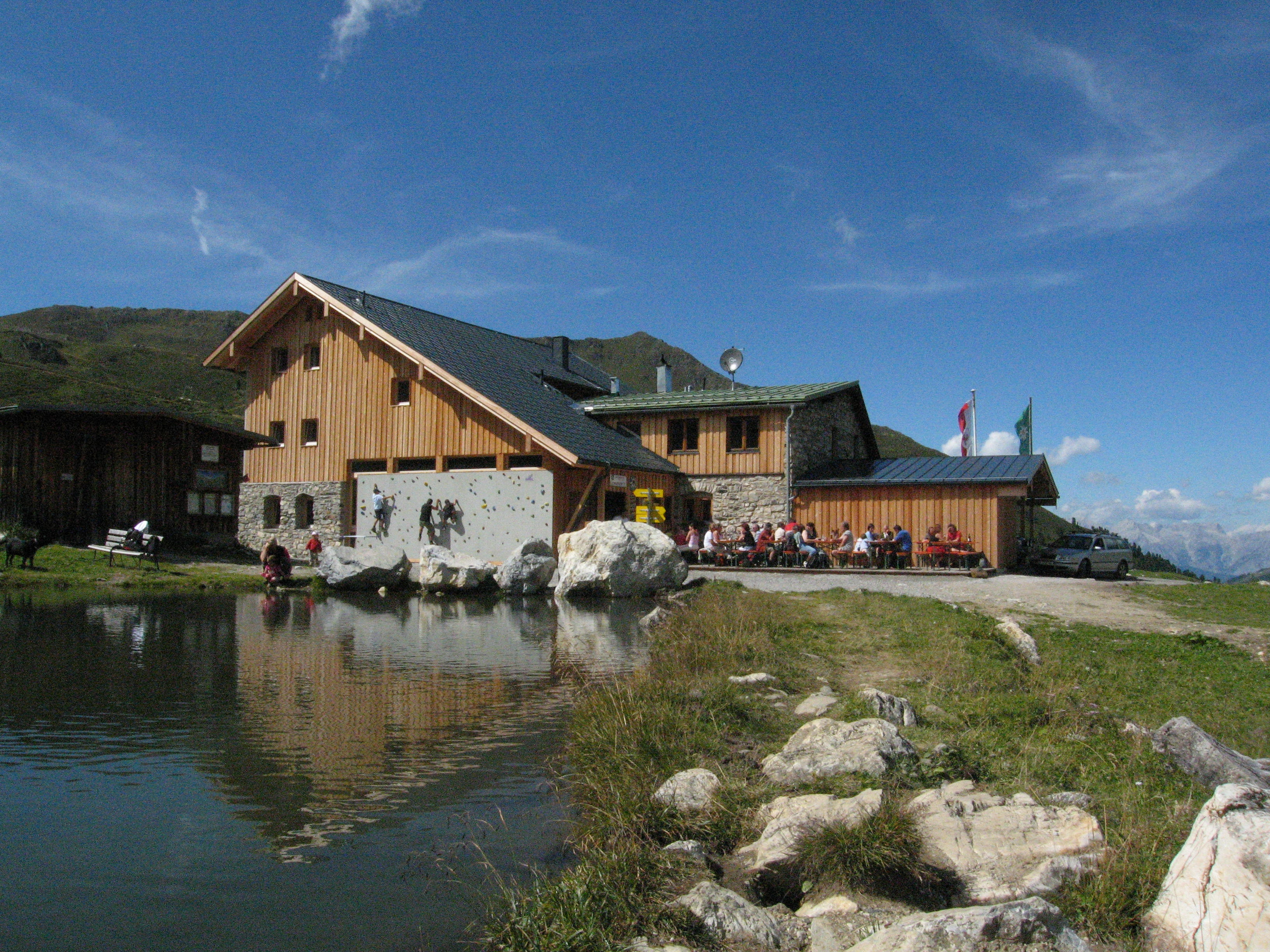
- Interactive map of the Lizumer Hütte area

General information
- Location: Wattentaler Lizum
- Coordinates: 47°9′59.9″N 11°38′26.3″E
- Elevation: 2,019 m (6,624 ft)
- Year built: 1912
- Owner: Austrian Alpine Club - Hall in Tirol Section

Website
- dav-main-spessart.de/gaudeamus.html

The Lizumer Hütte is an Alpine club hut of the Hall in Tirol section of the Austrian Alpine Club in the Tux Alps in the Austrian state of Tyrol. The hut is located in the rear Wattental in the middle of the extensive ski touring and hiking area of the Wattentaler Lizum. Due to its location and size, the hut is also used for a wide variety of alpine courses and seminars.

== History ==
Lizumer Hütte was built in 1912 by members of the Haller Alpenverein as a base for ski tours and was expanded in 1932. In the years 1938/39 the hut was expropriated by the German Reich. After the war, it became the property of the French occupation before being transferred to the Austrian government in 1955, which owns it to this day. In 2006, the hut was completely renovated by the Hall section of the Alpine Club, equipped with climbing walls inside and out, and in 2007 it was awarded the hut quality seal of the Austrian Alpine Club.

== Ascents ==
Lizumer Hütte can be reached in two hours from the parking lot at the Walchen camp. You can either take the military road on the western side of the valley or the Zirbenweg on the opposite side of the valley. Access by mountain bike via the military road is not permitted.

As a way to the Lizumer Hütte there are also some yoke crossings, namely the Klammjoch from the Navistal, the Torjoch from the Tuxer Tal and the Grafensjoch from Weerberg. The transition from the Lizumer Hütte to the Glungezerhütte via the Navisjoch and the Rosenjoch takes seven to nine hours of walking. It takes about five hours to walk to the Weidener Hütte.

The Lizumer Hütte is a base on a number of long-distance hiking trails, such as variant 02A of the Central Alpine Trail, the Via Alpina, the Munich-Venice route (Munich-Venice dream trail) or the Tyrolean Eagle Walk.

== See also ==
- Gaudeamus
