= British Eagle International Airlines Flight 802/6 =

1964 aviation accident

Coordinates: 47.2086°N 11.5281°E

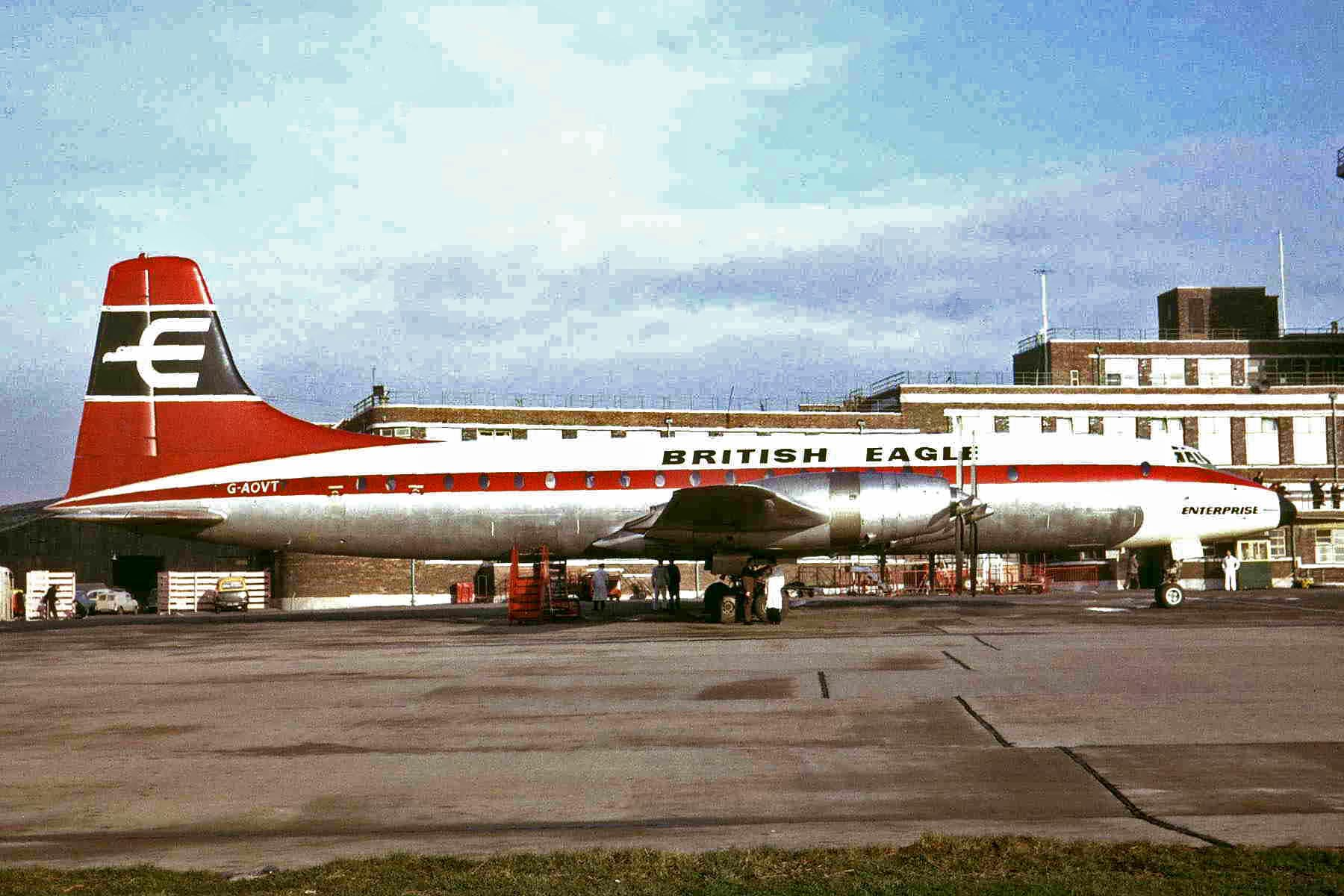
- A Bristol Britannia of British Eagle International Airlines, similar to the one involved

Accident
- Date: 29 February 1964
- Summary: Controlled flight into terrain
- Site: Glungezer mountain, Austria

Aircraft
- Aircraft type: Bristol Britannia
- Operator: British Eagle International Airlines
- Registration: G-AOVO
- Flight origin: London Heathrow Airport
- Destination: Innsbruck Kranebitten Airport
- Passengers: 75
- Crew: 8
- Fatalities: 83
- Survivors: 0

On Saturday, 29 February 1964, British Eagle International Airlines Flight 802/6 crashed into the Glungezer mountain near Innsbruck, Austria. The aircraft, a Bristol Britannia registered G-AOVO, had taken off from London Heathrow Airport, England, destined for Innsbruck Kranebitten Airport in Austria. All 75 passengers and 8 crew died in the crash.

== The crash ==
Flight 802/6 was an international scheduled passenger flight which took off from London Heathrow Airport at 12:04 p.m. bound for Innsbruck. The aircraft was a Bristol Britannia 312 which had previously been owned by B.O.A.C.. At approximately 1:35 p.m., the flight crew contacted Munich Air Traffic control. Nine minutes later the pilot of Flight 802/6 changed flight plans from Instrument Flight Rules (IFR) to Visual Flight Rules (VFR). Innsbruck had no instrument approach procedures and Flight described it as "generally regarded as one of the most difficult airports in Europe". As it passed over Innsbruck VHF omnidirectional range station, the aircraft was still unable to break through the clouds. Snow flurries were falling.

At 2:12 p.m., the crew of Flight 802/6 reported that they were at 10,000 ft (3,000 m). This was the last communication received from the aircraft. Several minutes later, Flight 802 flew into the eastern slope of the Glungezer mountain at a height of approximately 8,500 ft (2,600 m). Everyone on board the aircraft – 81 Britons (most of whom were on a ski holiday), one Austrian, and one Canadian – was killed in the crash.

== Aftermath ==
An avalanche caused crash debris to move approximately 400 metres downhill. Due to the weather and lack of light, the crash site was not found by aircraft until the day after. The recovery of the bodies and wreckage was hampered by the location, which was accessible only by helicopter.

The British government protested when the Austrian authorities made a preliminary statement three days after the incident, when the enquiry had barely started, and the BALPA journal criticised a statement from the airport that its equipment was working and not the cause of the accident.

The crash of British Eagle International Airlines Flight 802/6 is the worst aviation disaster in Austrian history.

== Cause ==
It was concluded that the pilot of Flight 802/6 had intentionally descended below the minimum safe altitude of 11,000 ft (3,400 m) in an attempt to penetrate the overcast. Just before the crash, the crew was flying without visual contact with the ground in violation of Austrian regulations concerning Innsbruck Kranebitten Airport. Despite the weather, other aircraft were operating in and out of Kranebitten Airport and this may have been a factor in why 802/6's pilot decided to continue the descent.
