= Tuxer Joch =

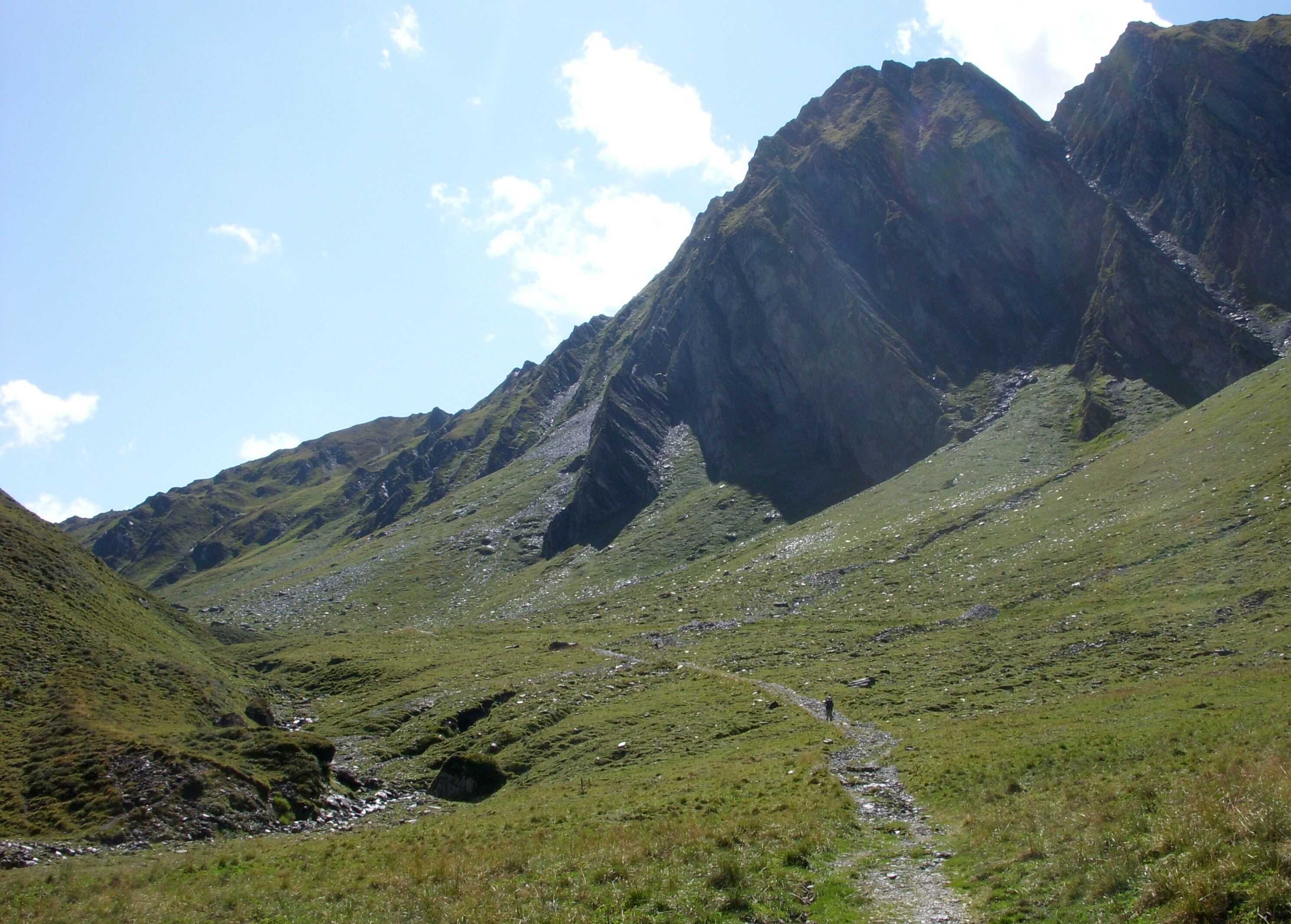
- The Tuxer Joch from the Weitental looking south

- Location within Austria
- Elevation: 2338AT
- Traversed by: hiking trail

Third Approach
- Location: Tyrol, Austria
- Range: Zillertal Alps
- Coordinates: 47.095°N 11.64389°E

The Tuxer Joch is a mountain pass in the Zillertal Alps in Austria at an altitude of 2,338 m (AA) that links the lower Zillertal valley with the Brenner route just north of the Brenner Pass. To the northeast just below the summit lies the Tuxer Joch-Haus.

== History ==
In early times there was a busy bridle path over the Tuxer Joch from the Brenner route into the Zillertal valley. As early as prehistoric times the saddle was known to humans. Finds of tools made of hornstein and south Alpine flints indicate that the Tuxer Joch was crossed by Stone Age peoples. A decorative pin from the Bronze Age was found at the pass. Farmers drove their cattle over the saddle, and farmers and traders also crossed the pass bearing local products. Occasionally funeral processions also passed this way, because the village of Tux once belonged to the parish of Schmirn on the other side of the saddle, so the dead had to be carried there. Later this parochial structure was changed, but the secular administrative arrangement was not altered until 1926. But the Tuxer Tal had long been oriented towards the Zillertal and when it was subsequently linked by a road in the 19th century, the Tuxer Joch lost its importance for local traffic and has since acted merely as a transit path for walkers.

In 1940/41 a plan emerged to build a tourist road over the Tuxer Joch, and a full-blown project was developed. This project was not just set up for tourist purposes, because a side road to the Brenner Pass was of considerable military-strategic importance to the Wehrmacht.

== See also ==
- List of highest paved roads in Europe
- List of mountain passes
