= Wattental =

Coordinates: 47°13′48″N 11°37′07″E

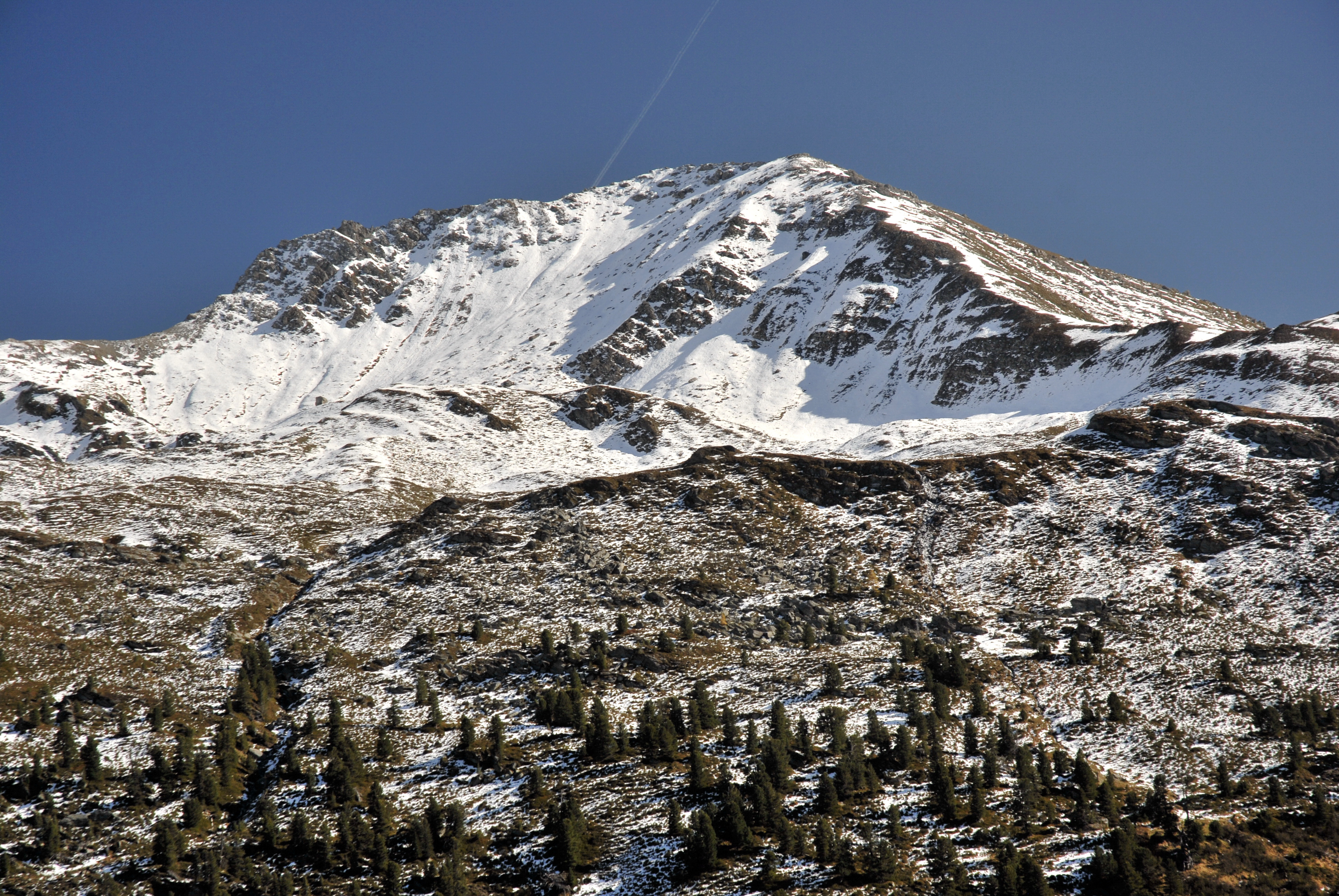
Graue Wand (2594m) in the Wattental

The Wattental is a southern side valley of the Inn valley.

The valley, through which the Wattenbach stream flows, is incised deeply into the quartz-phyllite rock of the Tux Prealps. The two dispersed settlements of Wattenberg and Vögelsberg (in the municipality of Wattens) sprawl across the outer part of the valley. At the head of the valley is the Wattentaler Lizum and its military training area of Lizum Walchen which is run by the Austrian Armed Forces. The Wattentaler Lizum lies entirely on the territory of Wattenberg.

The Wattental produces a high level of water power thanks to its large catchment area which is why internationally successful firms such as Swarovski, and Wattenspapier have been established in the village of Wattens by the River Inn. The Wattental was and is therefore the reason behind the economic boom of the market village of Wattens which has made it one of the wealthiest municipalities in Austria.

The valley is a popular recreation area. The summits of the Rotwandspitze, Hirzer and Hahneburger have outstanding views and can be climbed from bases in the valley. In the upper part of the valley (Mölsberg) access is limited by the military training area. On the first Sunday after the Assumption a service, the Mölsberg Mass (Mölsbergmesse) takes place at the summit cross of the Mölsberg in the middle of the Wattentaler Lizum, which is a memorial service to those from the valley who fell in the two world wars. On that day the training area is opened to private vehicles; normally it is out-of-bounds.

At the head of the valley is a small lake, the Mölssee.
