= Rosenjoch =

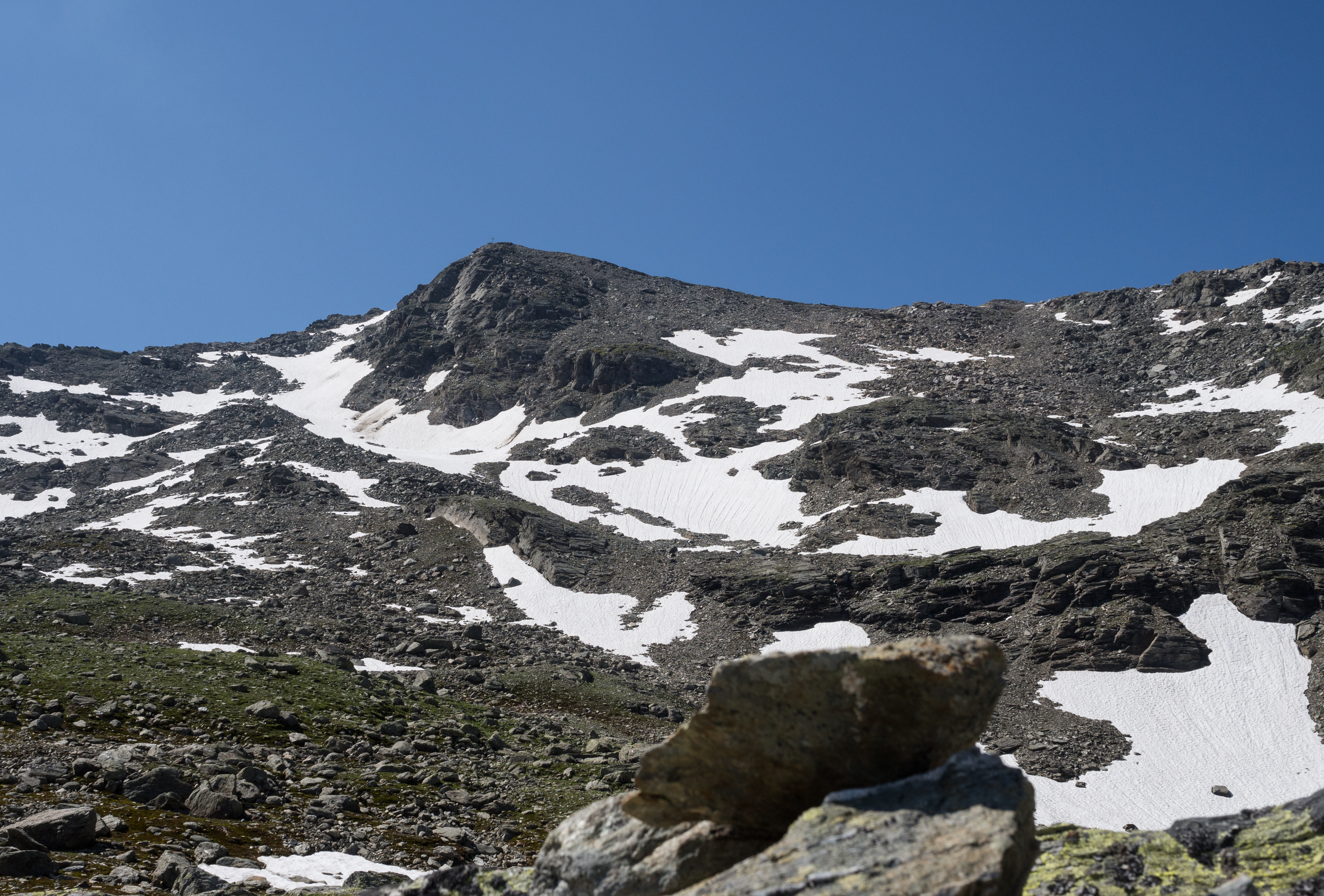
- The Rosenjoch from the north

Highest point
- Elevation: 2,796 m (AA) (9,173 ft)
- Prominence: 466 m ↓ Mölsjoch
- Isolation: 7.2 km → Lizumer Sonnenspitze
- Coordinates: 47°10′48″N 11°32′36″E

Geography
- Location within Austria
- Location: Tyrol, Austria
- Parent range: Tux Alps

Geology
- Rock age: Palaeozoic
- Rock type: Metamorphic rocks of the Innsbruck quartz-phyllite complex

The Rosenjoch is a mountain, 2,796 m (AA), and the highest point of the Voldertal and Arztal in the western Tux Alps. The top which bears a summit cross lies on the Inn Valley Mountain Trail (Inntaler Höhenweg) between the Glungezer Hut and Lizumer Hut in the Wattentaler Lizum and is thus frequently climbed in summer. The Rosenjoch may also be reached from the Voldertal Hut.

In late winter and early spring, the Rosenjoch is popular with skiers. Nevertheless, its ascent requires safe conditions.

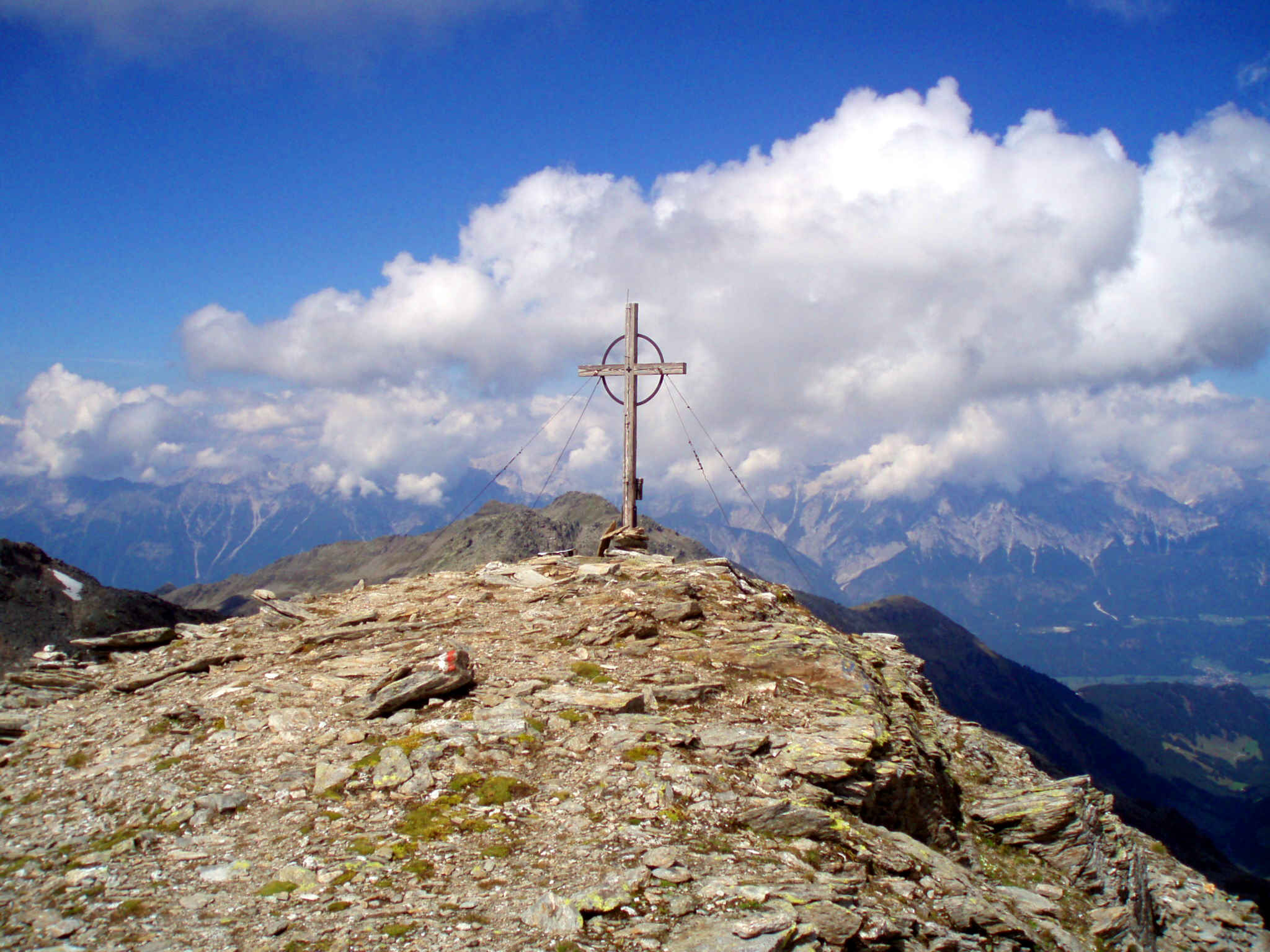
Summit cross on the Rosenjoch
