= Wattens =

- Municipality
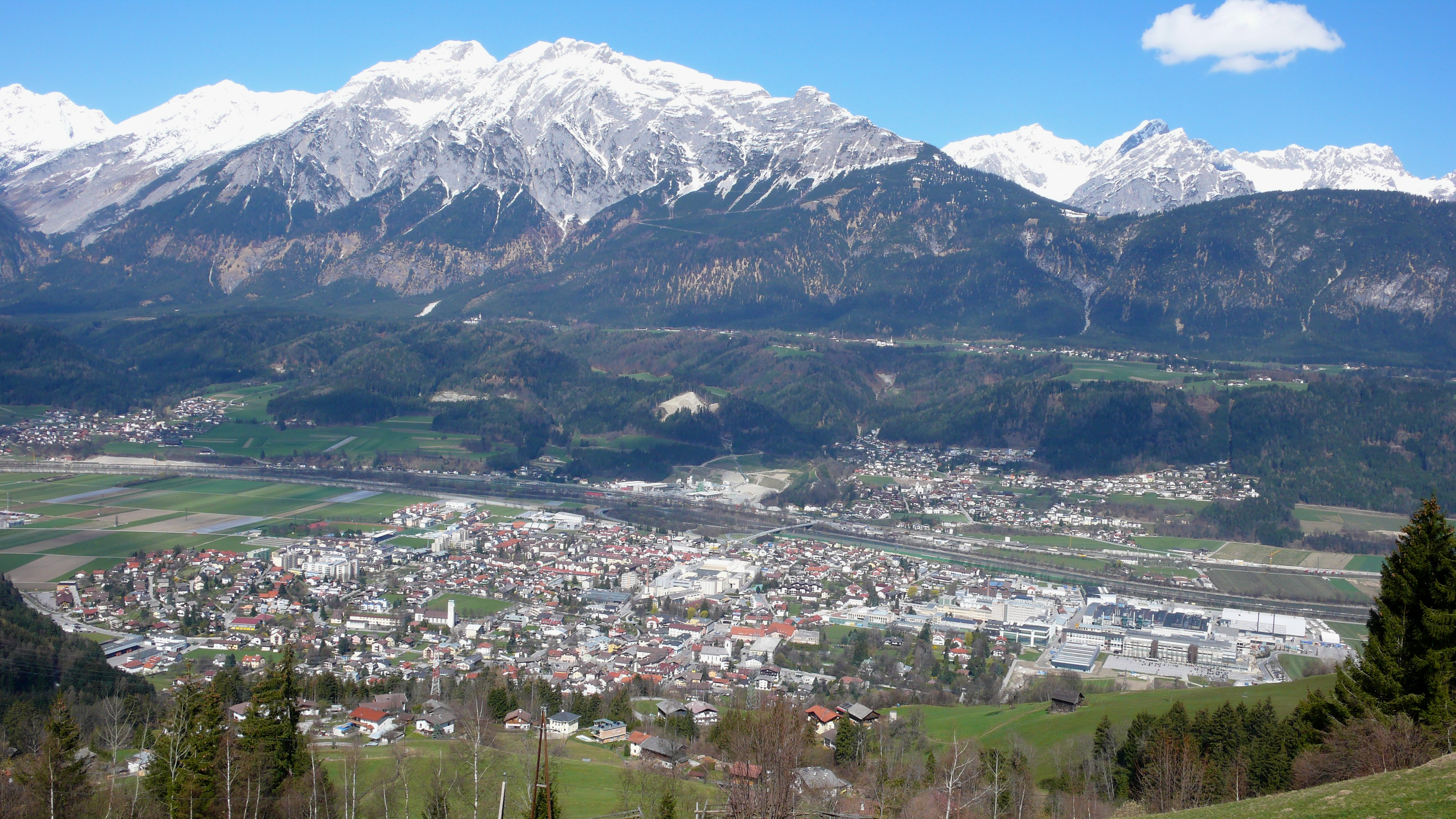
- View over Wattens and the Inn Valley to the Karwendel mountains

- Coat of arms

- Location within Austria
- Coordinates: 47°17′N 11°35′E
- Country: Austria
- State: Tyrol
- District: Innsbruck Land

Government
  - Mayor: Lukas Schmied (neu – Buergerliste Wattens)

Area
  - Total: 10.84 km^{2} (4.19 sq mi)
- Elevation: 564 m (1,850 ft)

Population (2020)
  - Total: 8,010
  - Density: 739/km^{2} (1,910/sq mi)
- Time zone: UTC+1 (CET)
  - Summer (DST): UTC+2 (CEST)
- Postal code: 6112
- Area code: 05224
- Vehicle registration: IL
- Website: www.wattens.com

Wattens is a market town of the Innsbruck-Land District in the Austrian state of Tyrol. It is chiefly known as home of the Swarovski crystal glass company.

== Geography ==
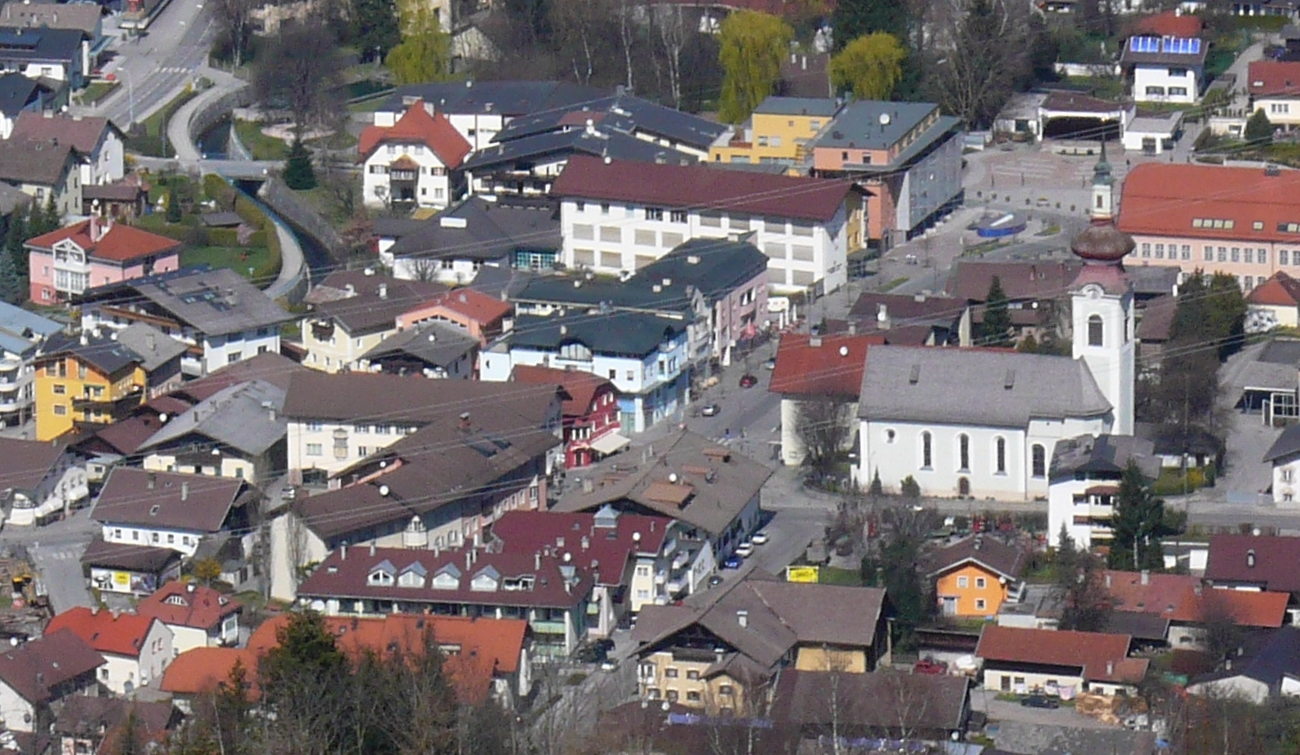
Main square with St Lawrence Church

Wattens is located in the Lower Inn Valley of North Tyrol, about 13 km (8 miles) east of Innsbruck. The municipal area stretches from the southern shore of the Inn River into the Wattental side valley, leading to the Wattentaler Lizum head within the Tux Alps range.

It has access to the Inn Valley Autobahn (A 12) and is served by ÖBB trains at Fritzens-Wattens station on the Lower Inn Valley Railway line.

== History ==
Archaeological settlement traces date back to the La Tène era; the name Wattens was first mentioned as Vuattanes in a 930 deed, when the area was part of the German stem duchy of Bavaria. The region was held by the Counts of Tyrol from the 12th century onwards and acquired by the Austrian House of Habsburg in 1363.

In 1559 a paper mill was established at Wattens, the first in the Austrian lands. The local economy was further promoted, when in 1895 Daniel Swarovski (1862–1956), a glass cutter from Jiřetín pod Bukovou in Bohemia, settled here to start the production of crystal jewelry. Wattens received market rights in 1895.

== Population ==
Historical population
Year	Pop.	±%
1869	838	—
1880	816	−2.6%
1890	874	+7.1%
1900	968	+10.8%
1910	2,000	+106.6%
1923	2,300	+15.0%
1934	3,233	+40.6%
1939	3,372	+4.3%
1951	4,364	+29.4%
1961	5,402	+23.8%
1971	6,249	+15.7%
1981	6,300	+0.8%
1991	6,804	+8.0%
2001	7,291	+7.2%
2011	7,625	+4.6%

== Economy ==
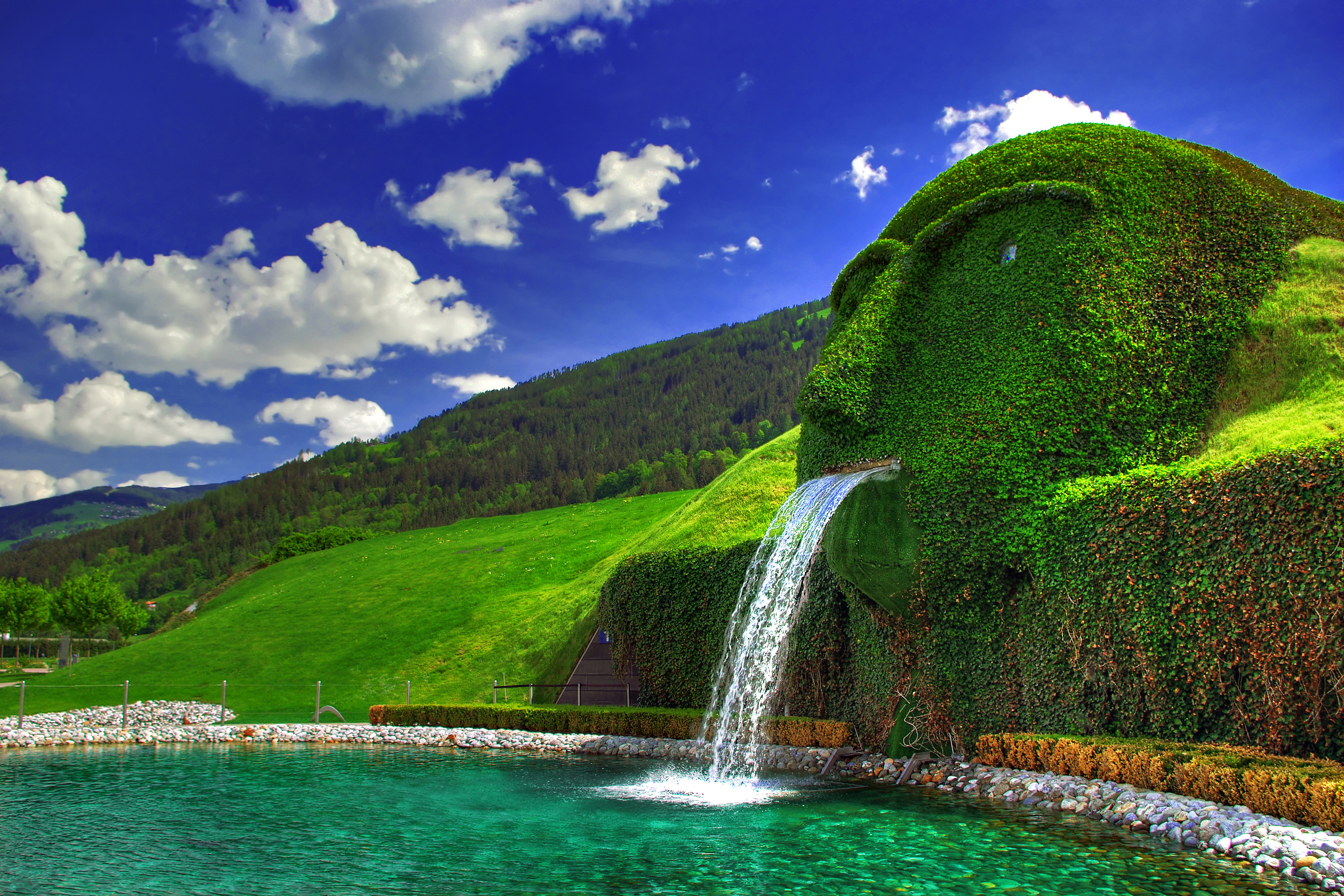
Giant waterspout at the entrance of ''Swarovski Kristallwelten

The Swarovski company is Wattens' main employer. In 1995, it celebrated its one-hundred-years jubilee by the establishment of the Swarovski Kristallwelten museum. André Heller designed several cabinets of curiosities modelled on the historic chambers of Ambras Castle. The museum features the history of crystal manufacturing, the life of Daniel Swarovski and a large collection of crystals including works by notable artists like Brian Eno and Niki de Saint Phalle. It is today one of the major tourist destinations in Austria, attracting visitors from all over the world.

Other museums are the typewriter museum and the Museum Wattens, dedicated to the history of Swarovski, the paper mill and excavations (Prehistory, Classical antiquity) in Wattens, as well as in neighbouring Volders and Fritzens.

The historic paper mill is the predecessor of the Wattenspapier factory, one of the leading manufacturers of rolling paper, since 1980 owned by the Finnish Delfort Group. 97% of the tobacco paper is exported to over 90 countries.

== Notable people ==
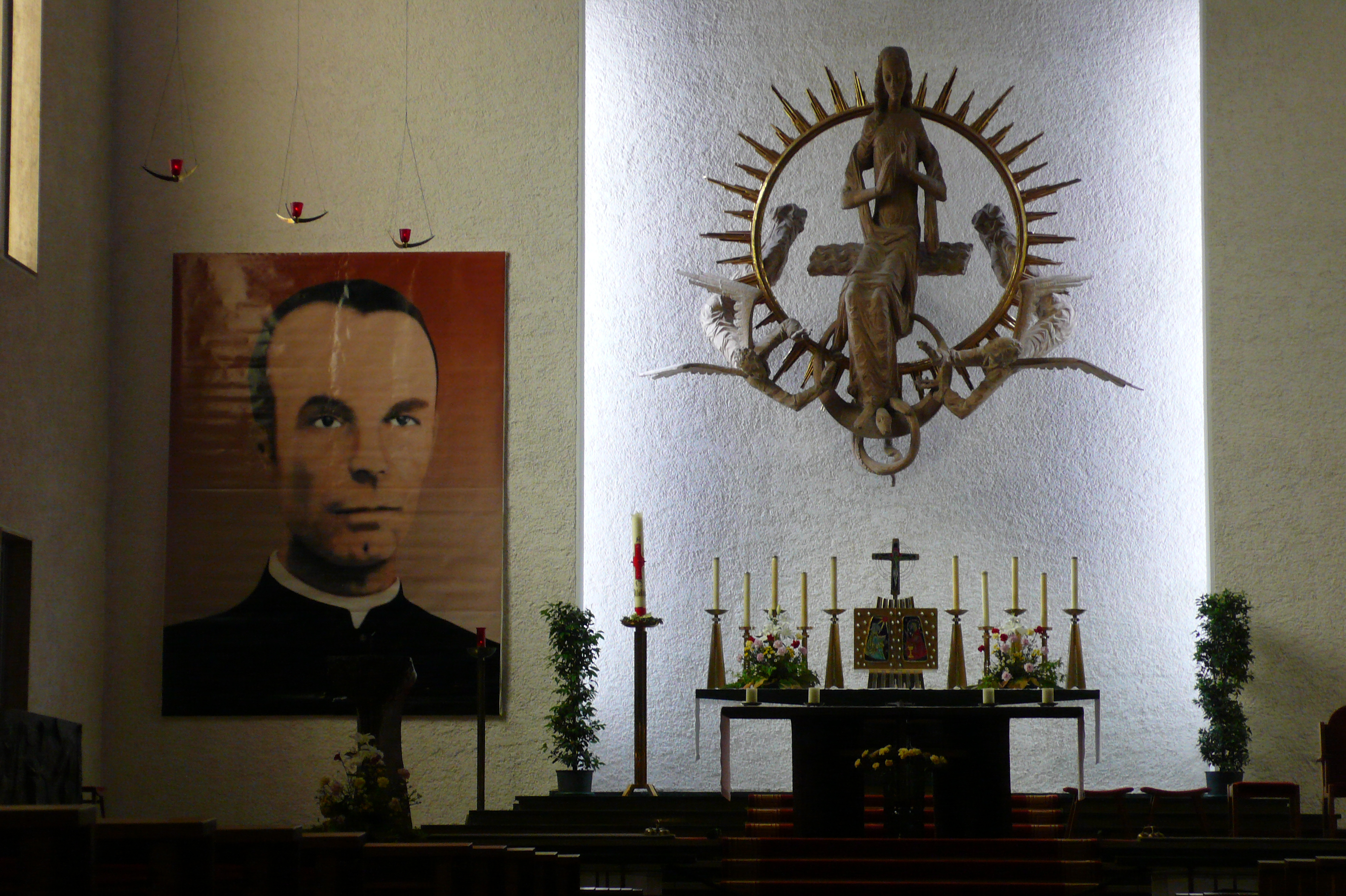
Portrait of Jakob Gapp at the St Mary's parish church

Wattens is the birthplace of the Marianist priest Jakob Gapp (1897–1943). Openly rejecting the Austrian Anschluss to Nazi Germany in 1938, Gapp fled to France and upon the French defeat in 1940 to Valencia in Spain, where he preached against the persecution of Catholic resistance fighters by the Nazi authorities. In November 1942 he was captured by Gestapo agents in German-occupied France and deported to Berlin. At trial of the People's Court led by President Roland Freisler, he was sentenced to death and was executed at Plötzensee Prison. A Christian martyr of the Catholic Church, Gapp was beatified by Pope John Paul II in 1996.

== Climate ==
Climate type is dominated by the winter season, a long, bitterly cold period with short, clear days, relatively little precipitation mostly in the form of snow, and low humidity. The Köppen Climate Classification subtype for this climate is Dfc (Continental subarctic climate).
