= Kellerjoch =

Mountain in the Tux Alps in Tyrol

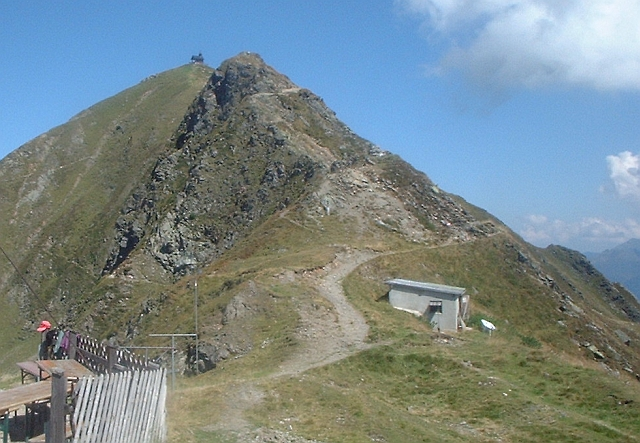
- The summit seen from the Kellerjoch Hut to the WSW.

Highest point
- Elevation: 2,344 m (AA) (7,690 ft)
- Coordinates: 47°19′08″N 11°46′15″E

Geography
- Location within Austria
- Location: Tyrol, Austria
- Parent range: Tux Alps

Geology
- Mountain type(s): gneiss and phyllite

The Kellerjoch is a 2,344 m-high mountain above the Inn valley near Schwaz in Tyrol, Austria.
