= Tux Alps =

Subgroup of Austrian Central subgroup of Eastern Alps, Central Europe

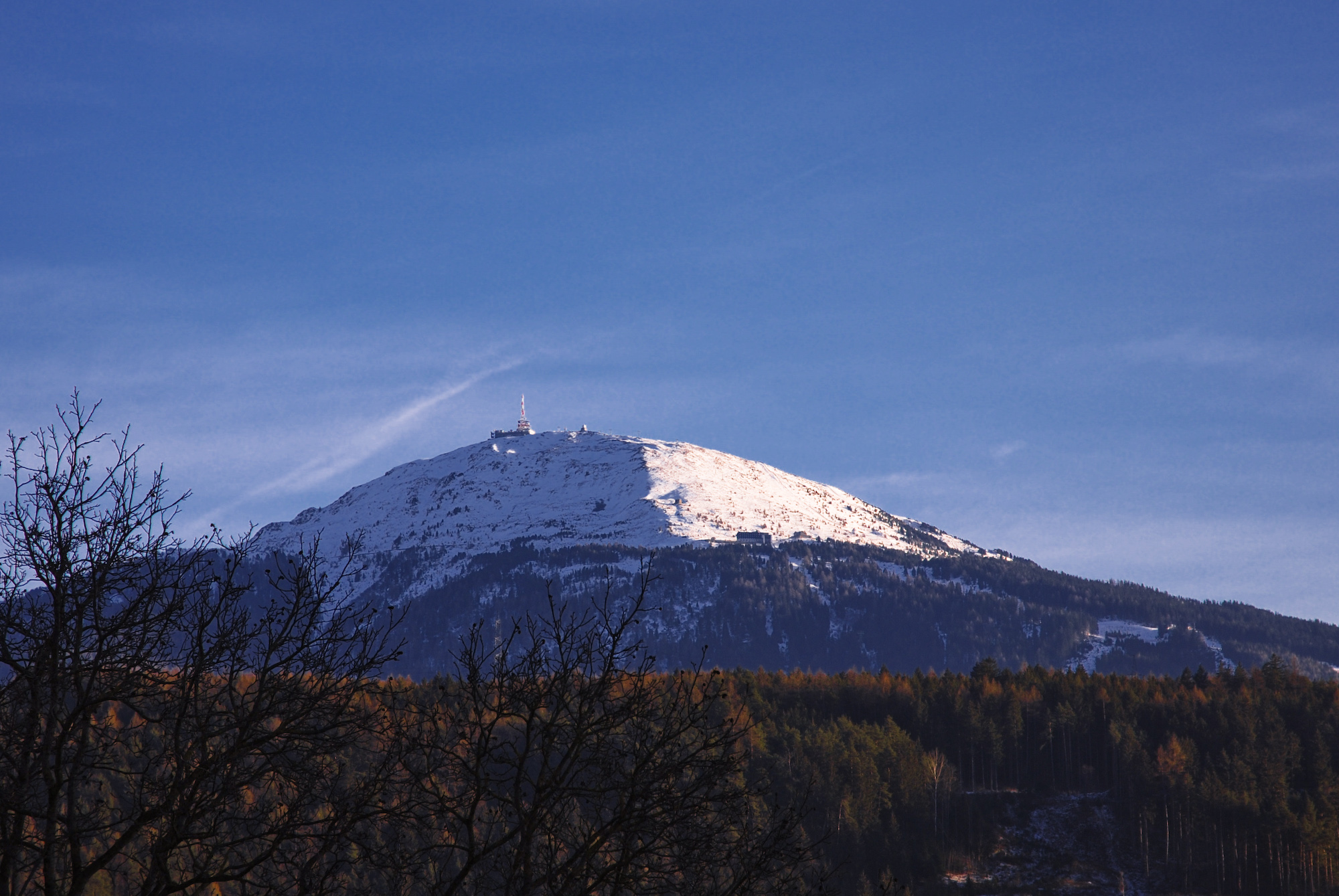
- Patscherkofel (2,246m/7,369ft)

Highest point
- Peak: Lizumer Reckner
- Elevation: 2,886 m (9,469 ft)
- Coordinates: 47°10′N 11°38′E

Geography
- Country: Austria
- State: Tyrol
- Parent range: Central Eastern Alps

The Tux Alps (German: Tuxer Alpen) or Tux Prealps (Tuxer Voralpen) are a sub-group of the Austrian Central Alps, which in turn form part of the Eastern Alps within Central Europe. They are located entirely within the Austrian state of Tyrol. The Tux Alps are one of three mountain ranges that form an Alpine backdrop to the city of Innsbruck. Their highest peak is the Lizumer Reckner, 2,886 m (AA), which rises between the glen of Wattentaler Lizum and the valley of the Navisbach. Their name is derived from the village of Tux which is tucked away in a side valley of the Zillertal.

The Alpine Club classification of the Eastern Alps (AVE) calls this range the Tux Alps. The name Tux Prealps was declared in the 1984 edition of the AVE as outdated and not longer applicable. The reality is that the mountain range can hardly be described as "prealps" in view of their sheer extent and height. The description only makes any sense when the range is seen in the context of the Zillertal Alps to the south, which are considerably higher than the Tux Alps and permanently covered in glaciers.

== Neighbouring ranges ==
The Tux Alps are surrounded by the following other ranges in the Alps:

- Karwendel (to the north)
- Brandenberg Alps (to the northeast)
- Kitzbühel Alps (to the east)
- Zillertal Alps (to the south)
- Stubai Alps (to the west)

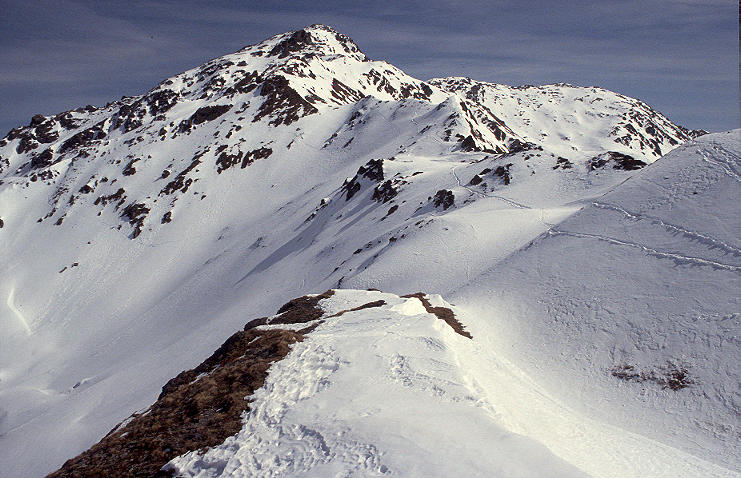
The Rastkogel (2,762 m), a popular ski touring goal

== Boundary ==
To the north the lower Inn valley forms the boundary of this range from Innsbruck downstream to the Inn's confluence with the Ziller. The Ziller valley (Zillertal) borders the range in the east from the mouth of the Ziller on the Inn upstream as far as Mayrhofen. In the south the Tuxertal valley outlines the range from Mayrhofen to Hintertux. From there the boundary continues up to the saddle of the Tuxer Joch and through the Schmirntal valley to Sankt Jodok. To the west the Tux Alps are bounded by the Wipptal valley from Sankt Jodok downstream to Innsbruck.

The Tuxer Joch saddle links the Tux Alps to the Zillertal Alps.

The Tux Alps are a popular ski touring and hiking area. Its ski resorts are Glungezer, Lizum im Wattental, Hochfügen-Hochzillertal, Penken and Kellerjoch, Patscherkofel. The Patscherkofel mountain was a venue for the 1964 and 1976 Winter Olympics held in nearby Innsbruck.

== Major peaks ==
- Lizumer Reckner, 2,886 m
- Geier, 2,857 m
- Kalkwand, 2,826 m
- Rosenjoch, 2,796 m
- Rastkogel, 2,762 m
- Malgrübler, 2,749 m
- Hirzer, 2,725 m
- Glungezer, 2,677 m
- Gilfert, 2,506 m
- Grüblspitze, 2,395 m
- Kellerjoch, 2,344 m
- Patscherkofel, 2,246 m

== Geology ==
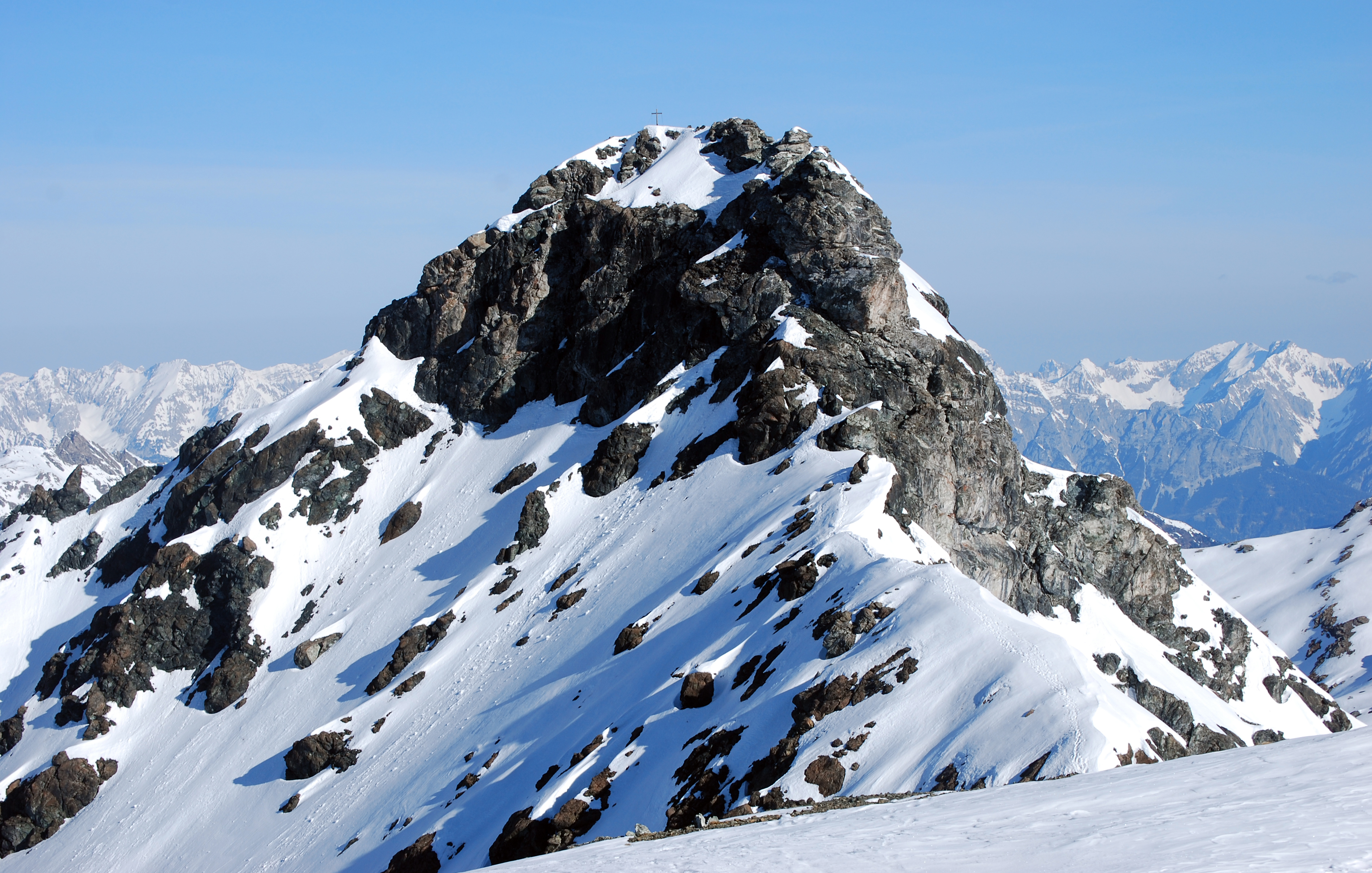
The highest mountain in the Tux Alps, the Lizumer Reckner, is made of serpentinite.

The largest part of the Tux Alps comprises low grade metamorphic rocks, that are classified as part of the Innsbruck quartz-phyllite complex (quartzitic phyllite slate). Next to this zone of Paleozoic rocks to the south there is a localised zone of various Mesozoic rocks, the so-called Tarntal Mesozoic. This complex zone belongs, like the quartz-phyllite zone, to the tectonic unit of the Lower Eastern Alps. Amongst the rocks of Tarntal Mesozoic may be found dolomite and limestones that are the basis of rock faces (Kalkwand and Torwand) in the area of the Wattentaler Lizum. On the other hand, there are also elements of the former ocean bed, in the shape of serpentinite that make up the Lizumer Reckner. The southern perimeter of the Tux Alps belongs to the tectonically deeper-lying Penninic Hohe Tauern window. Here in the Tux Alps these are mainly rocks of the Penninic Glockner Nappe (calc-schist envelope of the Tauern). The northeasternmost corner of the Tux Alps, from the area of Schwaz to Fügen im Zillertal, belongs to the Upper Eastern Alpine greywacke zone, which consists of Paleozoic rocks. Silver and copper were once extensively mined in this zone in the area around Schwaz.

== Long-distance hiking trails ==
The long-distance hiking trail known as the "Munich to Venice Dream Path" (Traumpfad München-Venedig) runs through the Tux Alps. This is not an official long-distance trail. Nevertheless, the route, which was first proposed in 1977, has achieved a greater profile than many of the other trails officially established and maintained by states or rambling clubs.

The 9th day leg of the dream trail runs from Hall in Tirol up to the Glungezer Hut; the next stage over the seven tuxer summits and the Naviser Jöchl to the Lizumer Hut which is operated by the Austrian Alpine Club section at Hall.

The 10th and 11th days run from the Lizumer Hut to the Tuxer Joch Haus, then over the Pluderling Saddle and the Gschützspitze Saddle.

Other long-distance trails in the Tux Alps are the Eagle Way (Adlerweg), the Via Alpina (red), Olympic Way (Olympiaweg), Glungezer & Geier Way No. 335 (Glungezer&Geier-Weg 335), and Central Alpine Way No. 02a.

== Huts ==
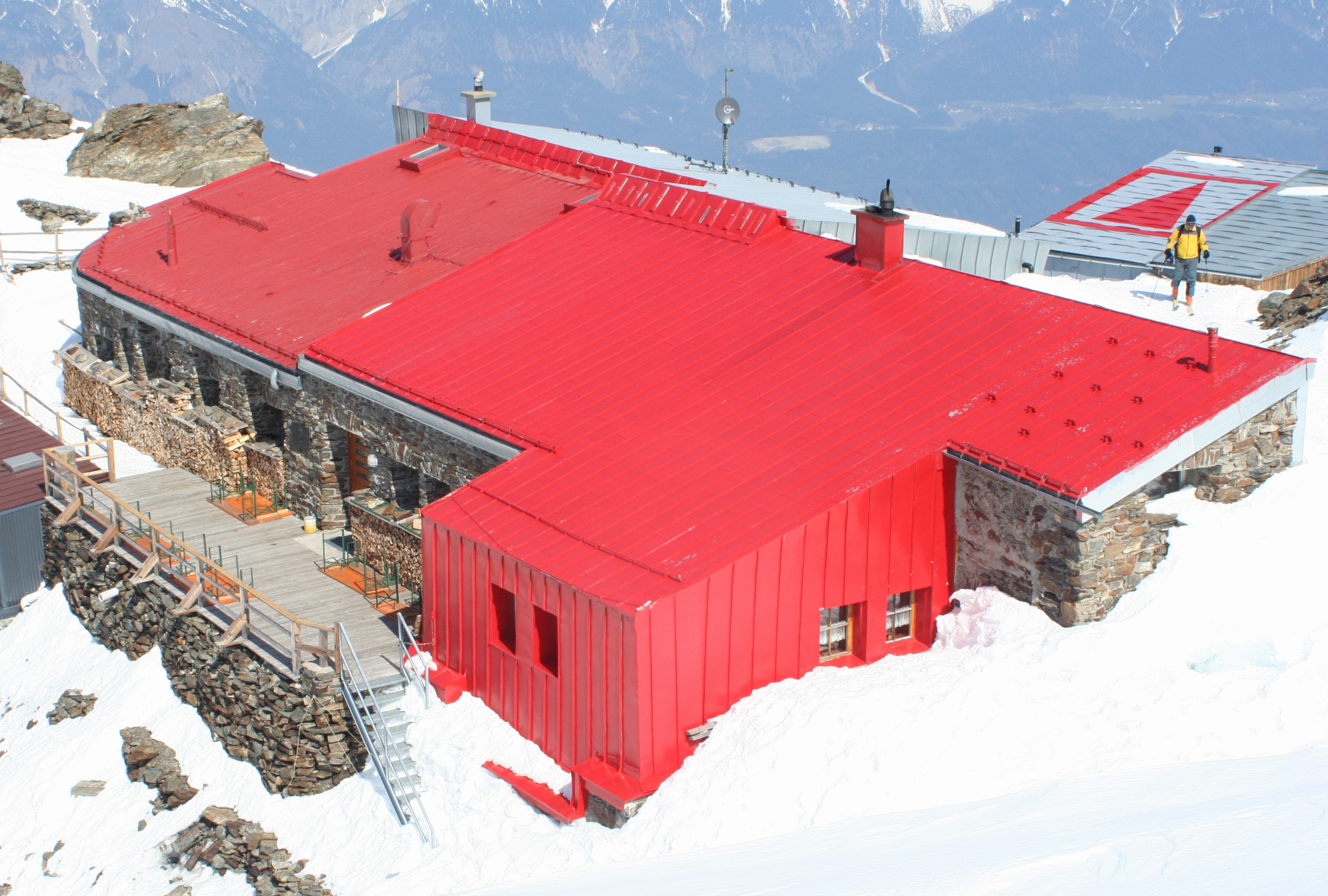
The Glungezer Hut

The following Alpine Club huts are located in the Tux Alps:

- Glungezer Hut
- Kellerjoch Hut
- Lizumer Hut
- Meißner Haus
- Navis Hut
- Patscherkofelhaus
- Rastkogel Hut
- Vinzenz Tolling Hut
- Voldertal Hut
- Weertal Hut
- Weiden Hut
