= Wattenberg, Tyrol =

Wattenberg
- Municipality
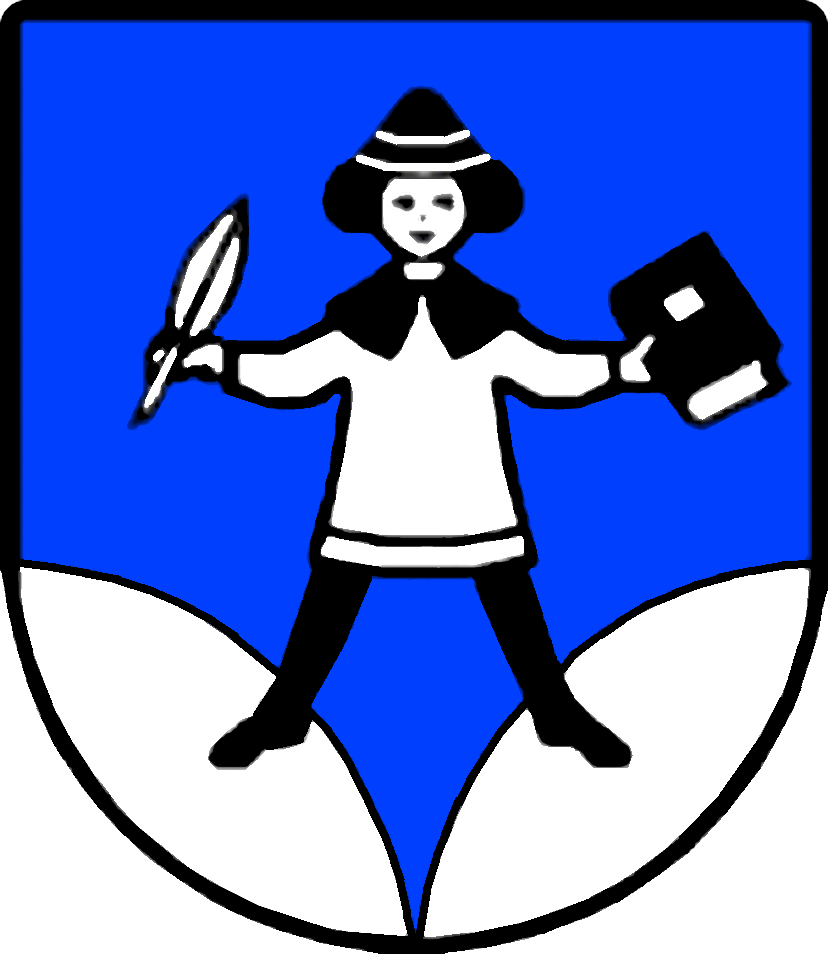
- Coat of arms

- Location within Austria
- Coordinates: 47°16′24″N 11°36′21″E
- Country: Austria
- State: Tyrol
- District: Innsbruck Land

Government
  - Mayor: Johann Geißler (ÖVP)

Area
  - Total: 67.71 km^{2} (26.14 sq mi)
- Elevation: 1,050 m (3,440 ft)

Population (2018-01-01)
  - Total: 739
  - Density: 10.9/km^{2} (28.3/sq mi)
- Time zone: UTC+1 (CET)
  - Summer (DST): UTC+2 (CEST)
- Postal code: 6113
- Area code: +43 5224
- Vehicle registration: IL
- Website: http://www.wattenberg.tirol.gv.at

Wattenberg is a municipality in the district of Innsbruck-Land in the Austrian state of Tyrol located 15 km east of Innsbruck and 2.50 km above the Swarovski crystal town Wattens.

== Population ==
Historical population
Year	Pop.	±%
1869	380	—
1880	373	−1.8%
1890	341	−8.6%
1900	394	+15.5%
1910	402	+2.0%
1923	425	+5.7%
1934	430	+1.2%
1939	523	+21.6%
1951	498	−4.8%
1961	442	−11.2%
1971	486	+10.0%
1981	518	+6.6%
1991	562	+8.5%
2001	715	+27.2%
2011	721	+0.8%

== Gallery ==
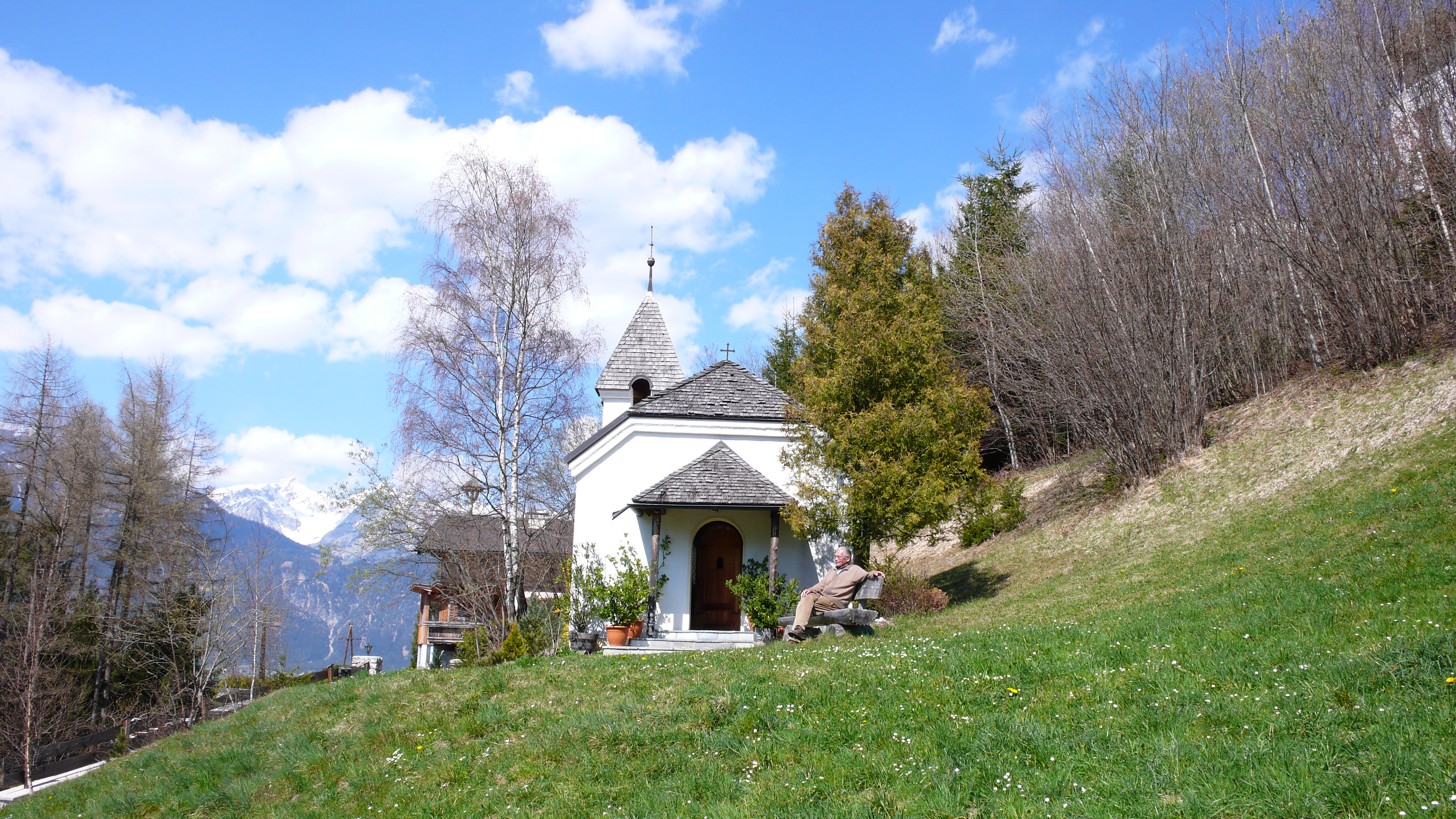
Wattenberg.

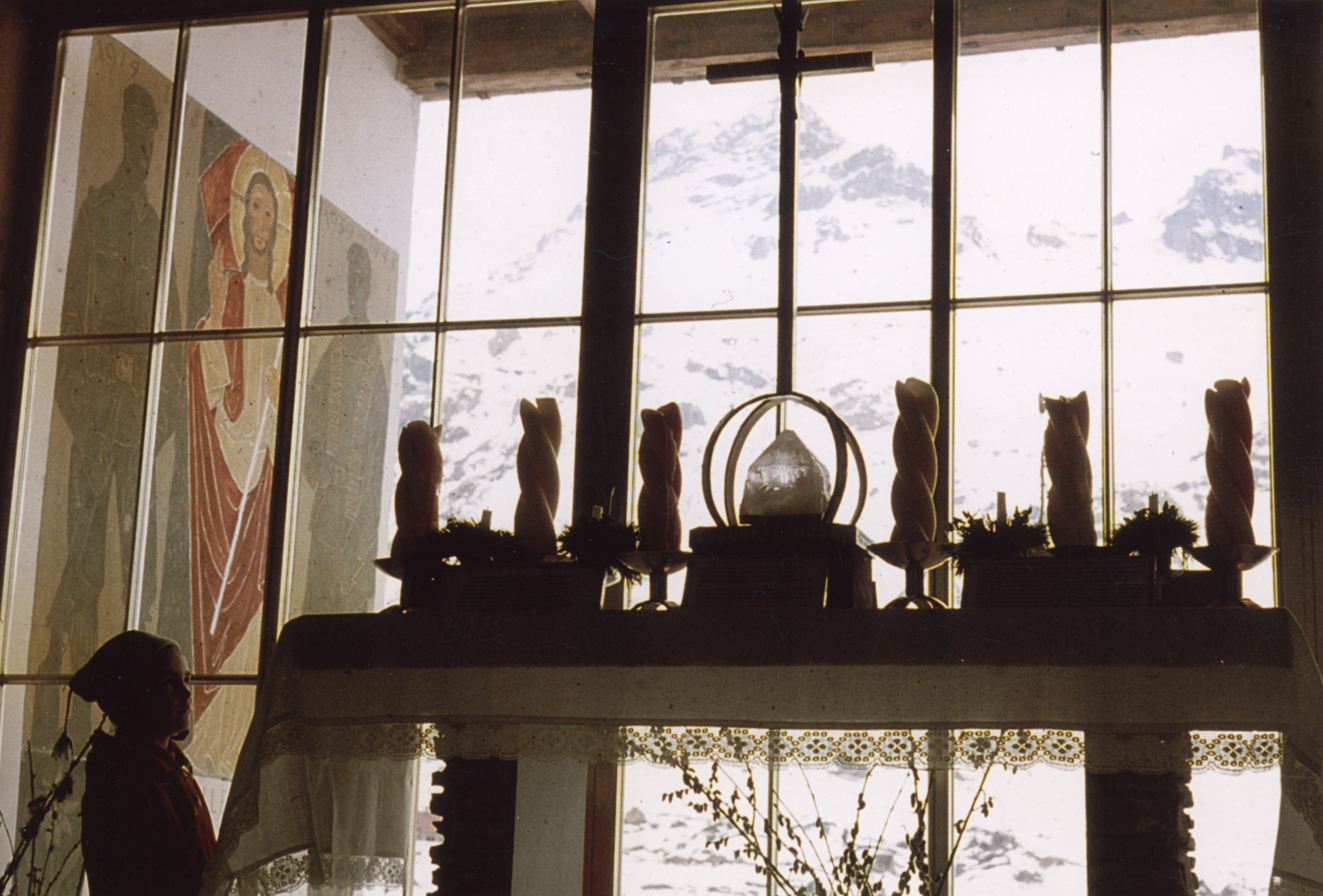

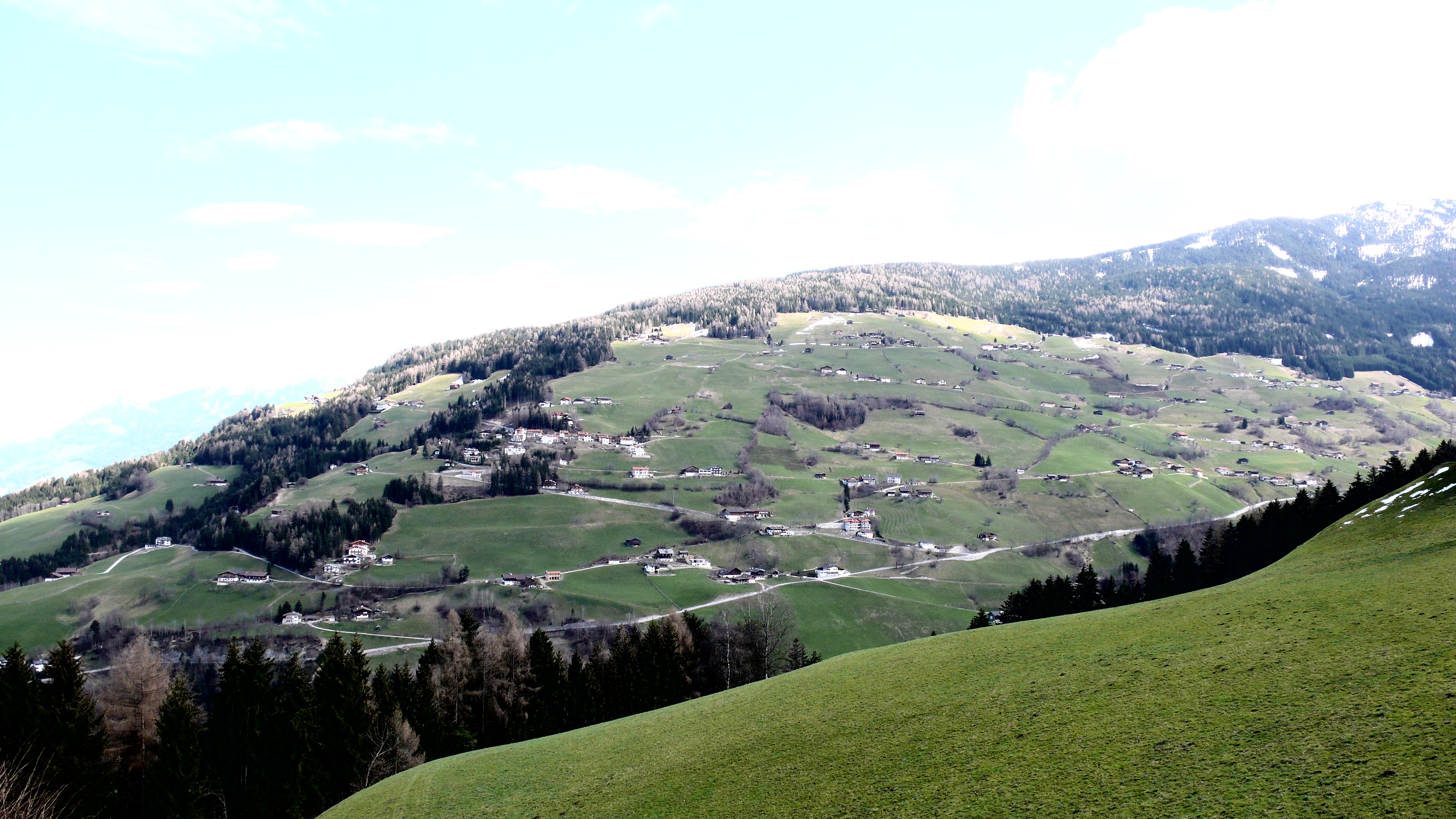
Wattenberg Tyrol.
