= Glungezer =

Mountain in the Austrian Tyrol

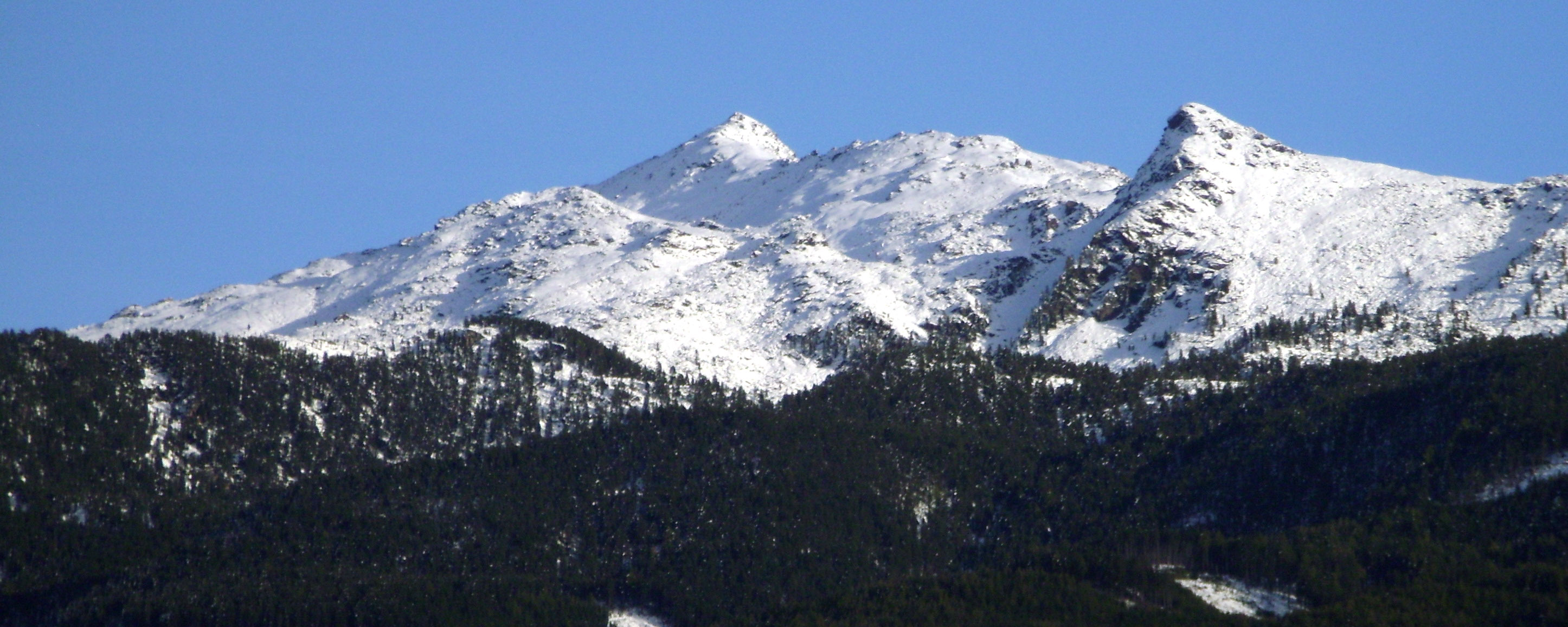
- The Glungezer (high peak in centre of photo) and Sonnenspitze (high peak right of centre, w/ less snow coverage) seen from Innsbruck. Left foreground: the Bärenbader Jöchl, right: the Neunerspitze (2,285 m)

Highest point
- Elevation: 2,677 m (AA) (8,783 ft)
- Coordinates: 47°12′31″N 11°31′41″E

Geography
- Location within Austria
- Location: Tyrol, Austria
- Parent range: Tux Alps

Geology
- Rock age: Paläozoikum
- Mountain type: quartz-phyllite

The Glungezer is a mountain in the Tux Alps in Tyrol southeast of Innsbruck in Austria.

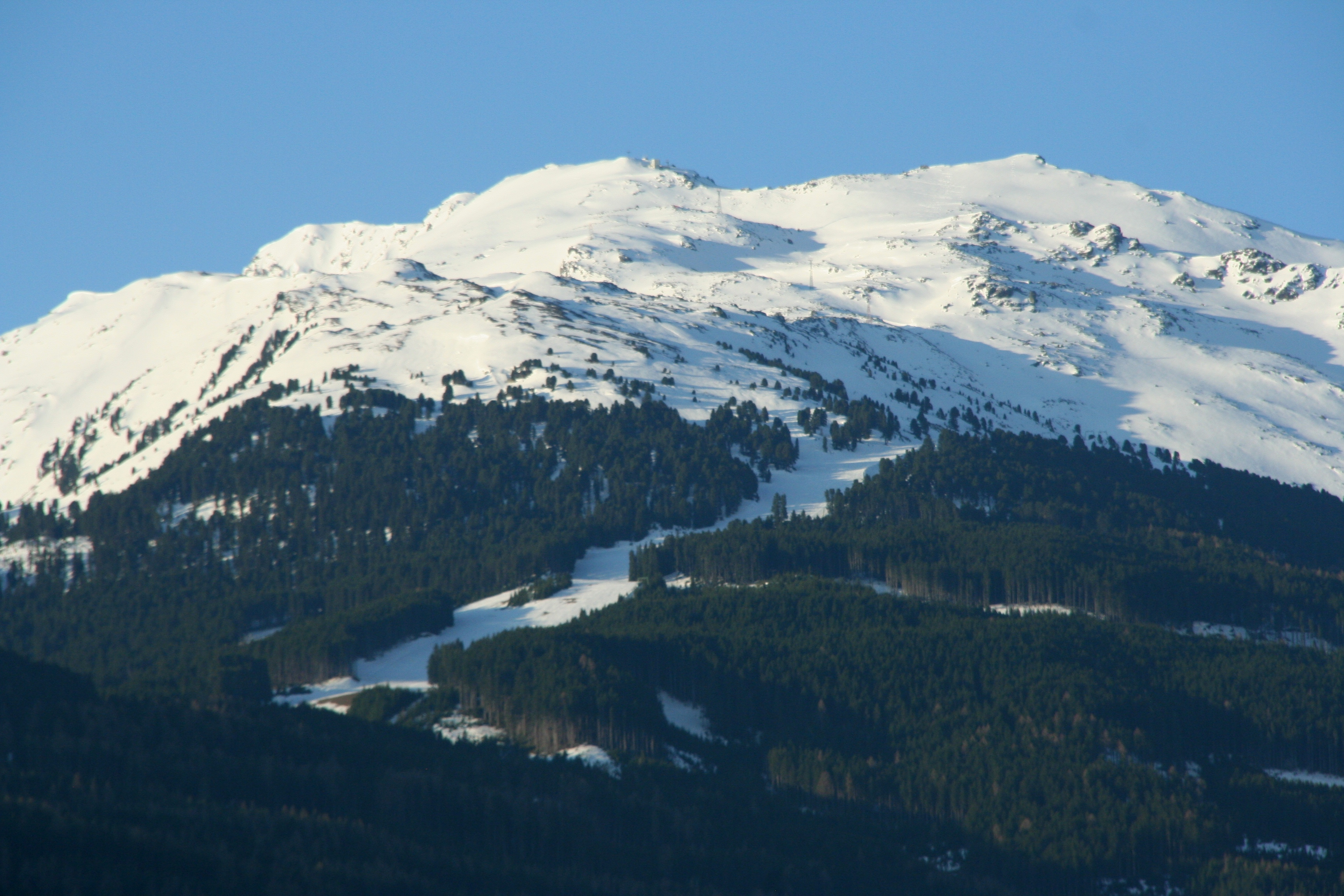
Glungezer from NNE (Baumkirchen). Right: the Sonnenspitze; left: Glungezergipfel

== History ==
=== Origin of the name ===
The name "Glungezer" (historical spelling also Glunggezer) probably goes back to an onomatopoeic imitation of gurgling water. In a hollow above the Tulfeinalm, but also in other places, the water flows invisibly between and under the boulders.

=== Aircraft accident ===
On 29 February 1964, a British Eagle Bristol Britannia 312 collided with the eastern slopes of the Glungezer at a height of 2,600 metres above sea level. The aeroplane was on the approach to Innsbruck and was flying under Visual Flight Rules. However, the pilots failed to break through the clouds. All 75 passengers and eight crew members were killed. The plane that flew into the mountain triggered an avalanche that carried most of the debris 400 metres further down the mountain. Even the innkeepers of the Glungezer Hut, which was only a few hundred metres from the crash site, did not notice the crash because of the raging storm.
