= Wattentaler Lizum =

Head of the Wattental Valley

Coordinates: 47°10′21″N 11°38′16″E

The Wattentaler Lizum (locally also Wattener Lizum) is the name of the head of the Wattental valley which branches off the lower Inn valley near Wattens. Lizum means "alpine pasture at the head of the valley" in Tyrolese. The Wattentaler Lizum lies at the eastern end of the valley in the municipality of Wattenberg.

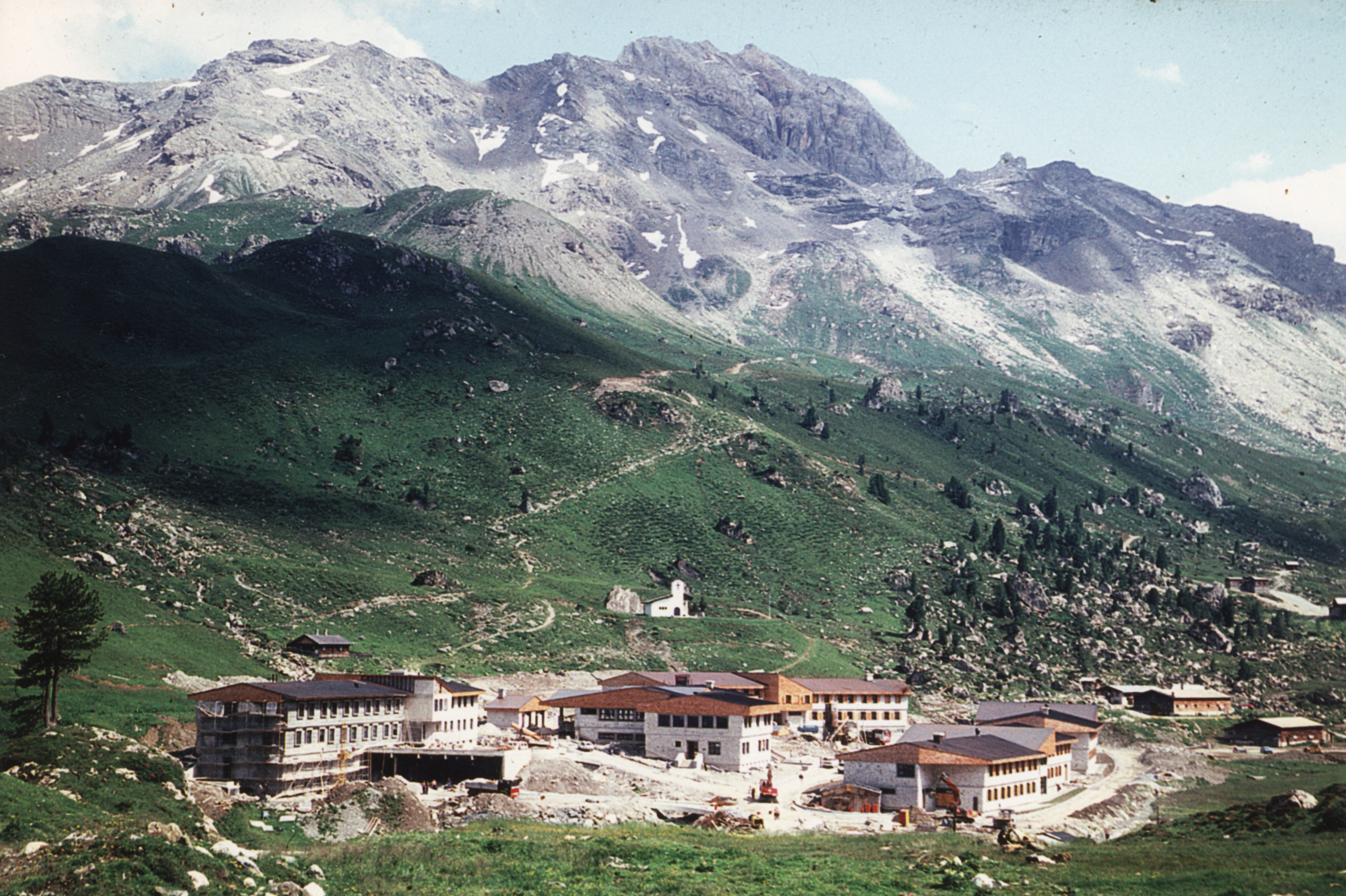
The Hochlager Lizum during construction in 1983

== Lizum-Walchen Training Area ==
The military training area of Lizum-Walchen has an area of over 50 km² and is the second largest in Austria after the Allentsteig Training Area. It covers the area of the Wattentaler Lizum and the Mölstal valley to the west. It belongs to the Austrian Armed Forces and puts up to 40,000 soldiers each year through military Alpine training. There are two military camps in the training area: Lager Walchen (1,410 m) and, four kilometres further south, Lager Lizum (1,995 m).

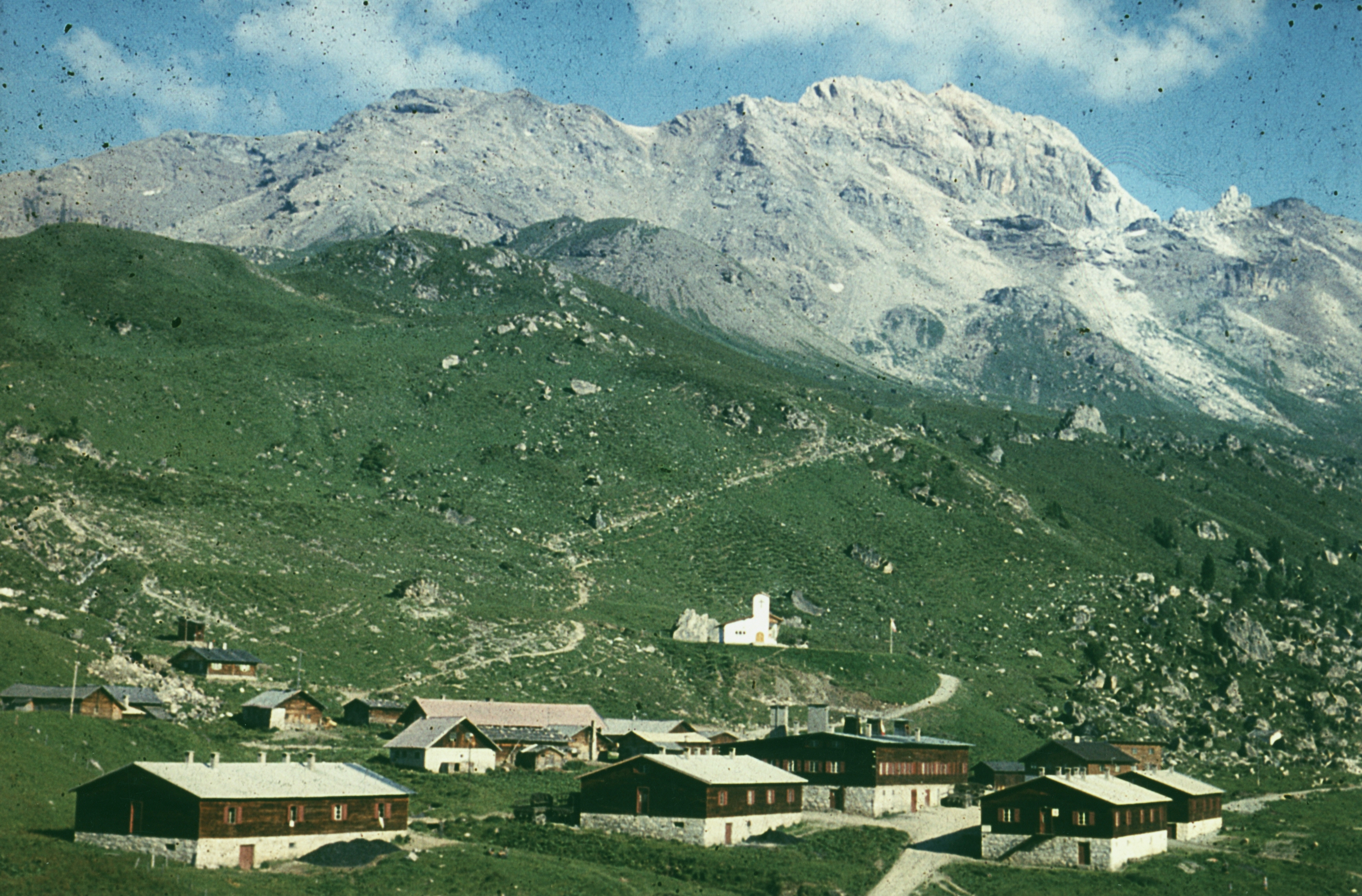
Lizum Camp (historic photo)

== Tourism ==
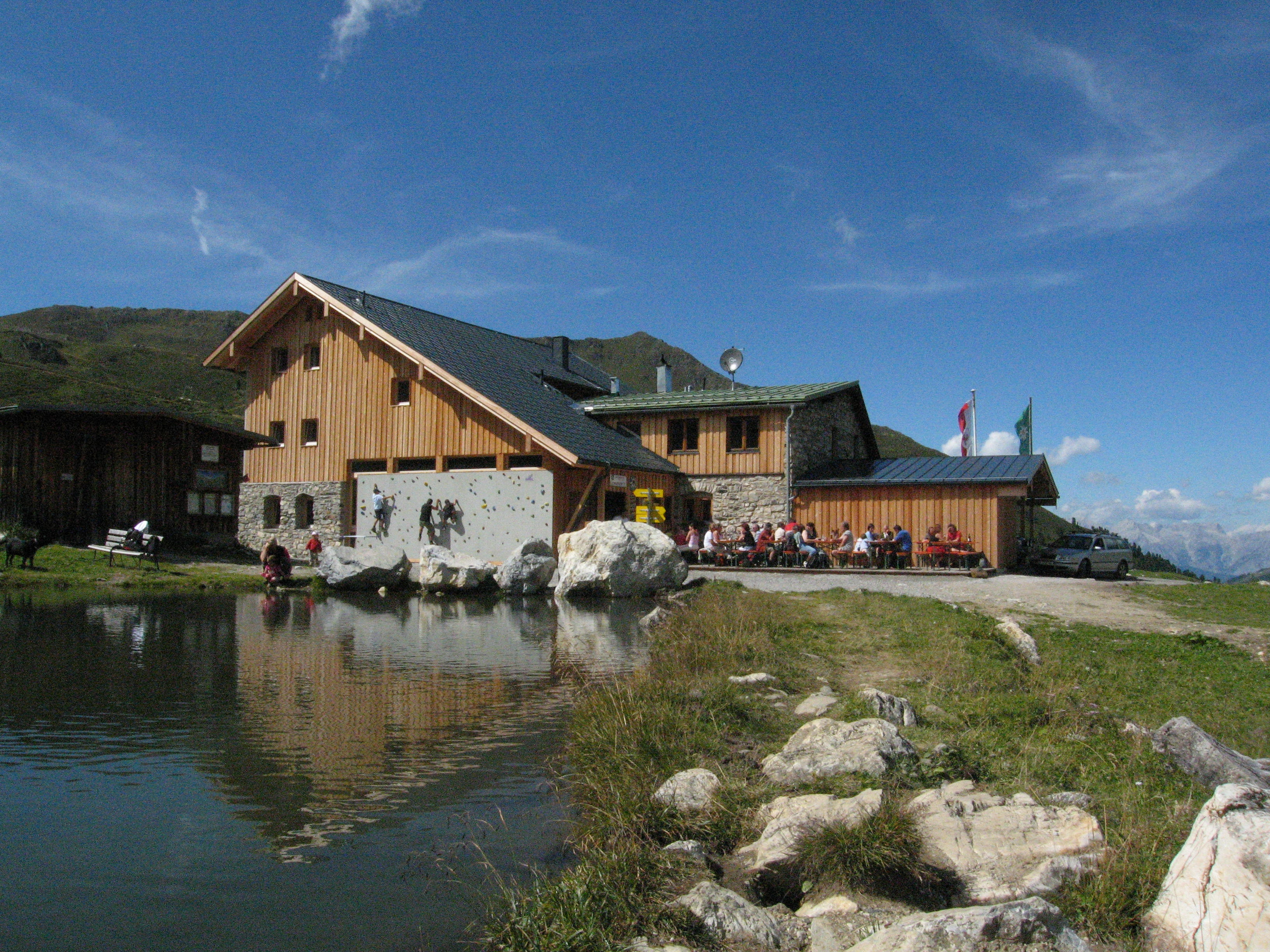
The Lizumer Hut (Austrian Alpine Club, Hall Section)

The Wattentaler Lizum is a base for walks and ski tours in the relatively gently, but sometimes avalanche-prone slopes in the surrounding ring of mountains. The area is highly suitable for professional Alpine training all year round due to its numerous descents (depending on the snow conditions) and summits as well as the infrastructure, both civil and military). During military exercises, walking in the region is sometimes restricted. On firing days, hikers must have passed the check points by 8:45 am and left the out-of-bounds area.

In the Lizum in the Wattental valley is a mountain hut, the Lizumer Hut (2,019 m), which was renovated in 2006/07 by the Hall Alpine Club. This Alpine Club hut lies on the intersection of several international long-distance hiking trails: the Via Alpina, Eagle Way, Munich-Venice Dream Path, Olympia Way - Garmisch-Innsbruck-Cortina, Central Alpine Way No.02A, Glungezer & Geier Way No. 315.

Nearby huts are the Glungezer Hut (8 hrs.), the Tuxer Joch Haus and the Weidener Hut.

== Summit service ==
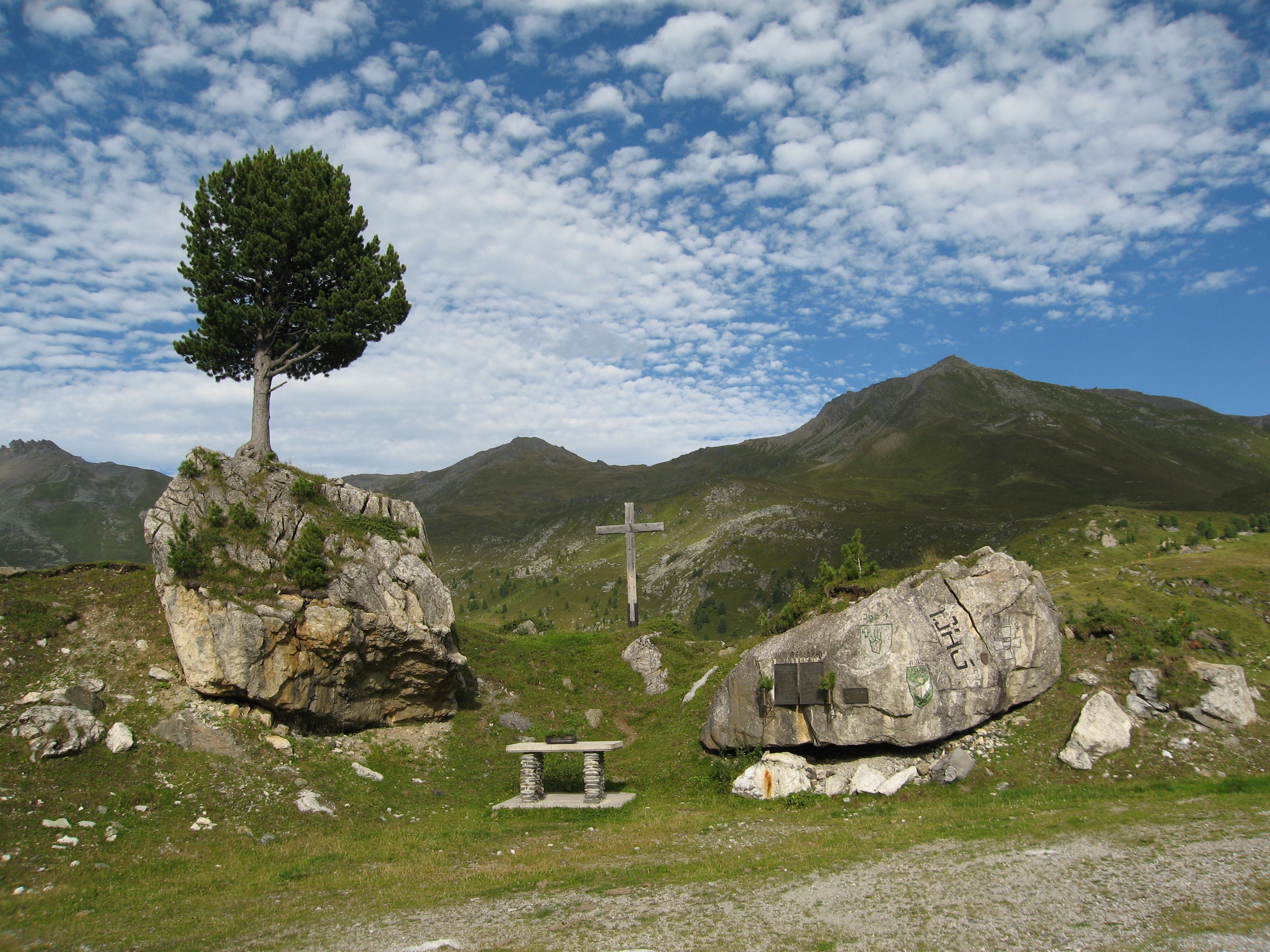
Site of the service in the Lizum

Traditionally there is a mountainside service on the first Sunday after the Assumption of Mary on the Mölsberg statt. This is normally celebrated at the summit cross at 11:30 am. In bad weather, it is held at 11 in the Chapel of Christ the King (Christkönigskapelle) in the Lizum. On this day Lizum Training Area is opened to private cars with a Tyrolean number plate (only four-wheeled vehicles, no quads) at 10:30.

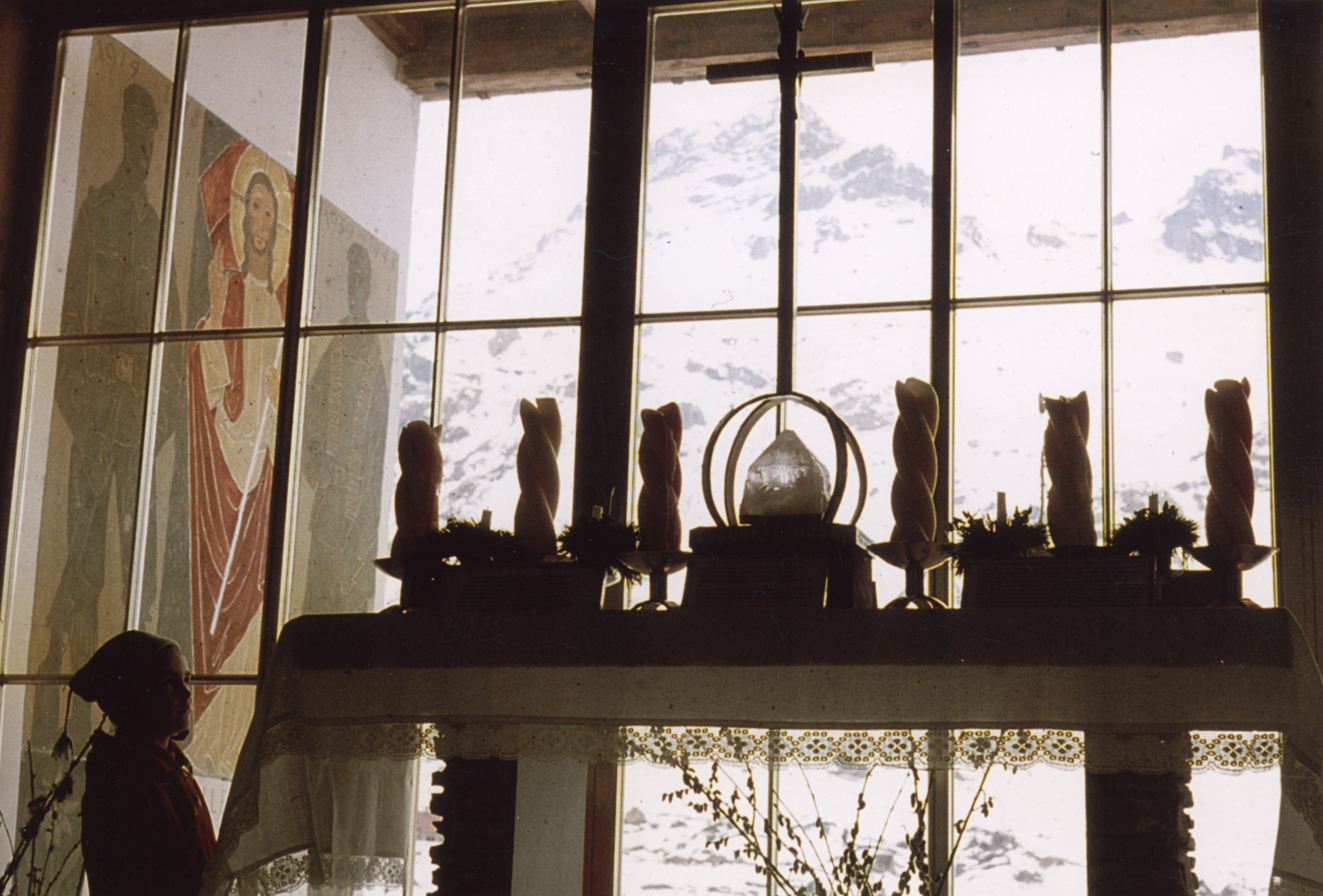
Lizum: Chapel of Christ the King (Christkönigskapelle)
