= Schmirn =

- Municipality
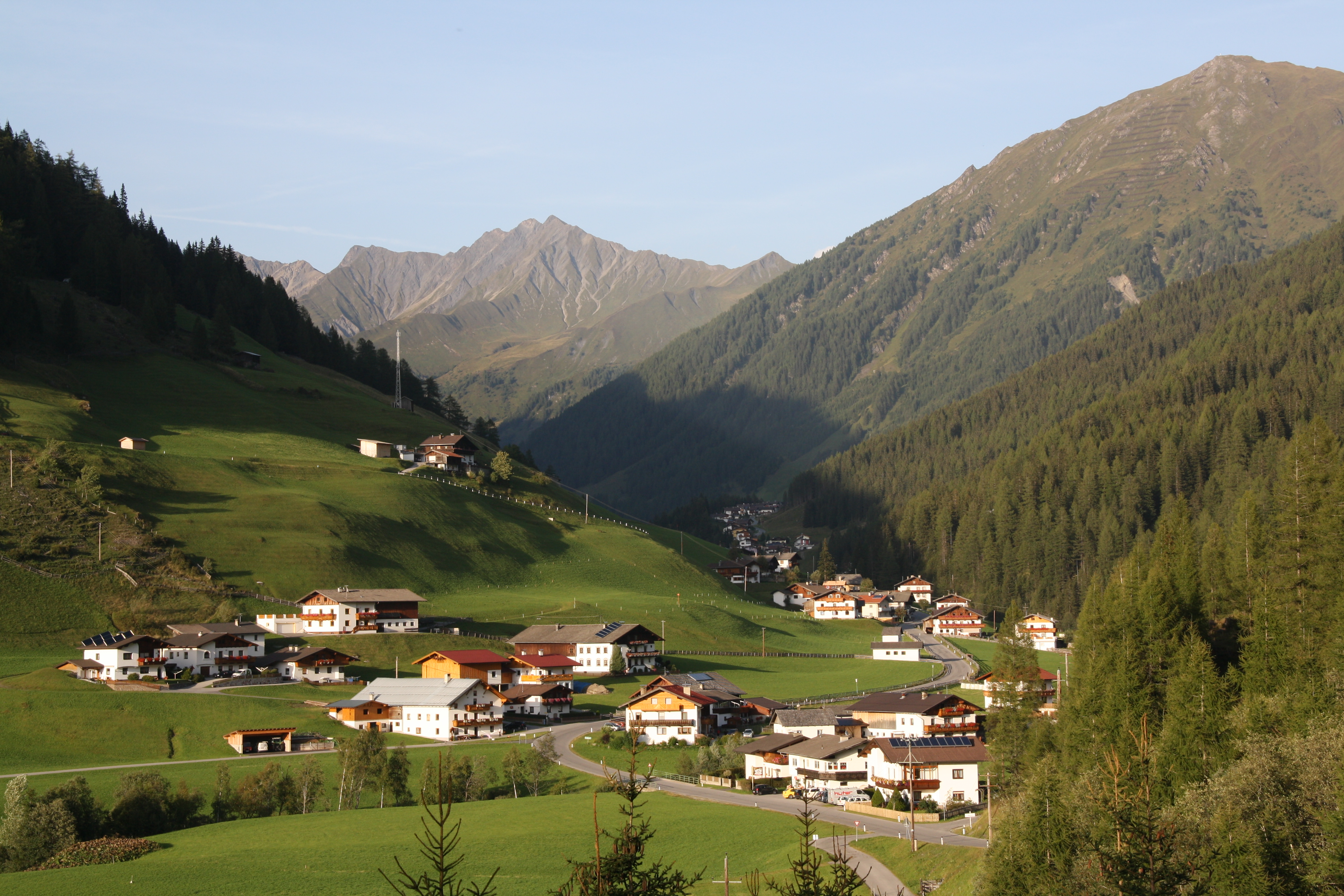

- Coat of arms

- Location within Austria
- Coordinates: 47°04′46″N 11°33′53″E
- Country: Austria
- State: Tyrol
- District: Innsbruck Land

Government
  - Mayor: Vinzenz Eller

Area
  - Total: 62.64 km^{2} (24.19 sq mi)
- Elevation: 1,407 m (4,616 ft)

Population (2020)
  - Total: 875
  - Density: 14.0/km^{2} (36.2/sq mi)
- Time zone: UTC+1 (CET)
  - Summer (DST): UTC+2 (CEST)
- Postal code: 6154
- Area code: 05279
- Vehicle registration: IL
- Website: www.schmirn.tirol.gv.at

Schmirn is a municipality in the District Innsbruck-Land in the Austrian state of Tyrol.

== Geography ==
Schmirn is located 25 km (16 mi) southeast of Innsbruck, situated in the homonymous valley that branches off from Wipptal, at the village of Sankt Jodok until the Tux Alps. The northern part of Sankt Jodok is part of Schmirn, while the remaining part is under the jurisdiction of the southern village of Vals.

== Neighbour municipalities ==
Finkenberg, Navis, Steinach am Brenner, Tux, Vals, Wattenberg.

== History ==
The Romans invaded the valley through Tux Jöchl pass, then used it as grazing land. Schmirn was mentioned for the first time in 1249 as "Vallis Smurne" and became independent in 1811; until 1926 Hintertux, located in the Zillertal (Ziller Valley), was also part of the municipality. A church, dedicated to Saint Joseph, was built in 1756–1757 in Baroque style on project of Franz de Paula Penz and Seelsorger; in 1778 was raised to parish and was restored in 1958–1959. In 1831 Franz Fuchs III founded the village band that it is still active.

== Population ==
Historical population
Year	Pop.	±%
1869	741	—
1880	741	+0.0%
1890	710	−4.2%
1900	681	−4.1%
1910	681	+0.0%
1923	663	−2.6%
1934	710	+7.1%
1939	719	+1.3%
1951	786	+9.3%
1961	723	−8.0%
1971	736	+1.8%
1981	806	+9.5%
1991	877	+8.8%
2001	893	+1.8%
2011	895	+0.2%
