= Mühlbachl =

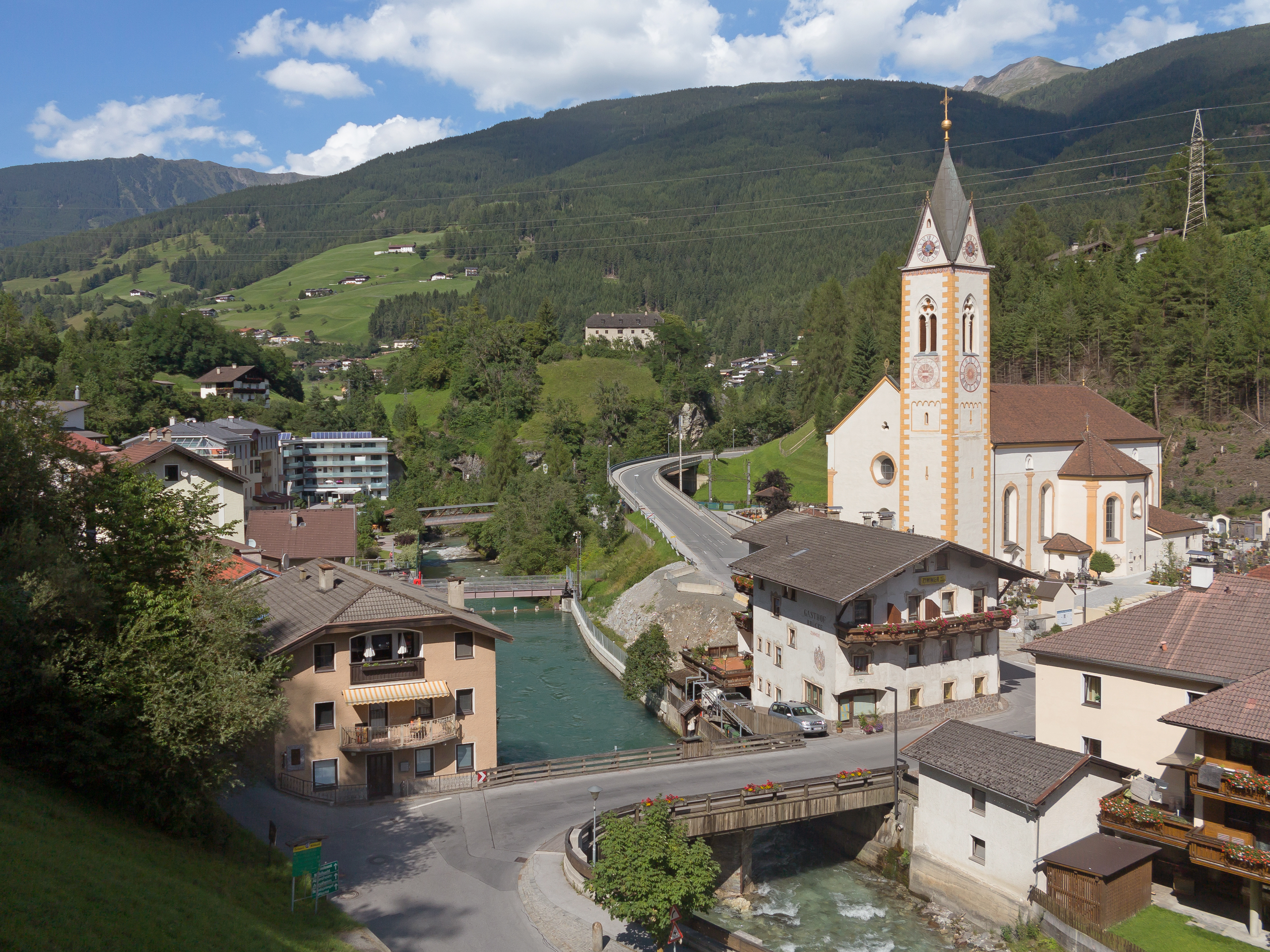

- Coat of arms

- Location within Austria
- Coordinates: 47°08′10″N 11°27′07″E
- Country: Austria
- State: Tyrol
- District: Innsbruck Land

Government
  - Mayor: Alfons Rastner (Österreichische Volkspartei or ÖVP)

Area
  - Total: 28.85 km^{2} (11.14 sq mi)
- Elevation: 995 m (3,264 ft)

Population (2018-01-01)
  - Total: 1,393
  - Density: 48.28/km^{2} (125.1/sq mi)
- Time zone: UTC+1 (CET)
  - Summer (DST): UTC+2 (CEST)
- Postal code: 6143
- Area code: 05273
- Vehicle registration: IL
- Website: www.muehlbachl.tirol.gv.at

Mühlbachl was a municipality in the district Innsbruck-Land located 15 km south of Innsbruck. Mühlbachl extended from the southern slopes of Schönberg im Stubaital along Matreiwald to Steinach (to the aperture of the Navistal) and the Sill River flew through it. It had 1,349 inhabitants. On 1 January 2022 Mühlbachl and Pfons were merged into the municipality of Matrei am Brenner.

A famous place of pilgrimage, Maria Waldrast, can be reached by hiking up the mountain Serles to the west. The Serles is 2,718 metres high.

== Neighboring municipality ==
Ellbögen, Fulpmes, Matrei am Brenner, Mieders, Navis, Neustift im Stubaital, Pfons, Schönberg im Stubaital, Steinach am Brenner, Trins, Telfes im Stubai,

== Population ==
Historical population
Year	Pop.	±%
1869	679	—
1880	749	+10.3%
1890	721	−3.7%
1900	852	+18.2%
1910	990	+16.2%
1923	958	−3.2%
1934	1,007	+5.1%
1939	985	−2.2%
1951	1,095	+11.2%
1961	1,140	+4.1%
1971	1,147	+0.6%
1981	1,290	+12.5%
1991	1,380	+7.0%
2001	1,375	−0.4%
2011	1,344	−2.3%
