= Lizumbach =

Location
- Country: Austria
- State: Tyrol

Physical characteristics
- Source
  - location: Between Navis and Madseit near the mountain pass Junsjoch
  - coordinates: 47.1446°N 11.6418°E
- Mouth
  - location: Confluence with the Mölsbach north of Wattens, forming the Wattenbach
  - coordinates: 47.2084°N 11.6249°E

Basin features
- Progression: Wattenbach→ Inn→ Danube→ Black Sea

Lizumbach is a river of Tyrol, Austria, in the Tux Alps.

The Lizumbach springs between Navis and Madseit near the mountain pass Junsjoch. North of Wattens, it unites with the Mölsbach thus forming the river Wattenbach.

Next to the Lizumbach, there is a military camp, the Lager Walchen.
