= Ruetz (river) =

Ruetz Ruetzbach
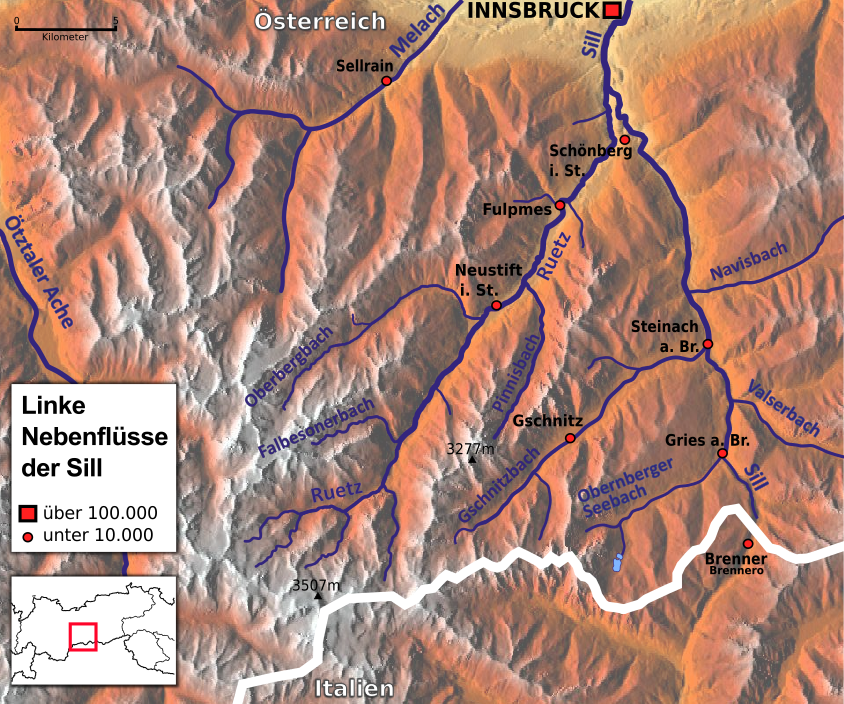
- Course of the Ruetz river

Location
- Country: Austria
- State: Tyrol

Physical characteristics
- Source
  - location: Stubai Alps
- Mouth
  - location: Sill
  - coordinates: 47.2137°N 11.3900°E
- Length: 36.8 km (22.9 mi)
- Basin size: 320 km^{2} (120 sq mi)

Basin features
- Progression: Sill→ Inn→ Danube→ Black Sea

The Ruetz is a river of Tyrol, Austria, a tributary of the Sill.

The Ruetz flows from the glacier area of the Stubaital to the Wipptal in north-east direction. Near the famous Europa Bridge, it merges with the Sill after a route length of appr. 37 km (23 mi). The river crosses the village of Fulpmes providing a nearby power station of the Austrian Federal Railways with electricity.

As a typical rapid-river the Ruetz is pretty dangerous and full of rapids. Before several defence structures had been constructed, it was quite feared due to floods. However, the water quality is very good and several communities in the Stubaital use the river as drinking water resource.

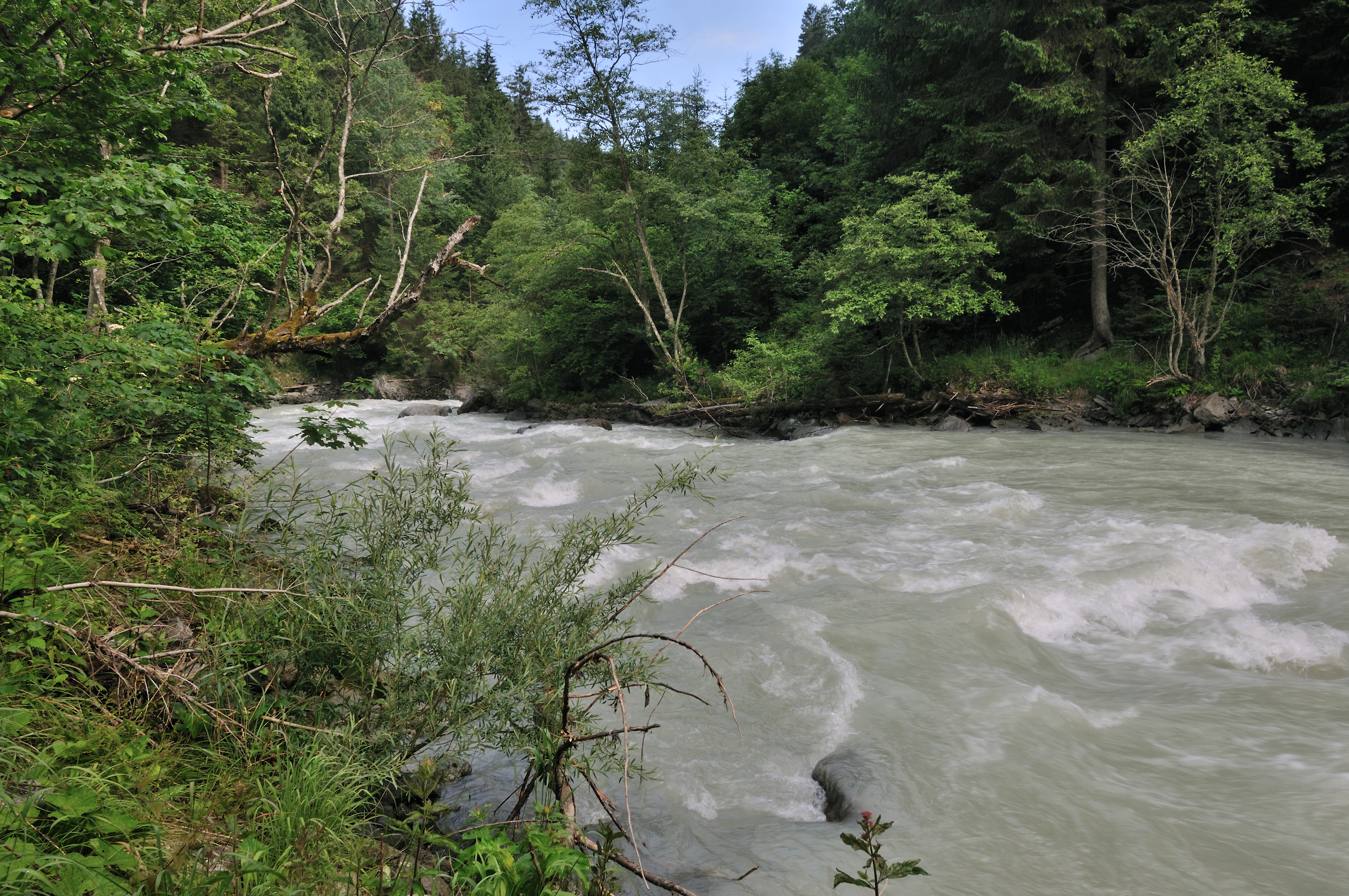
The Ruetz at Schönberg
