= Wattenbach =

Wattenbach may refer to:

- Wattenbach (Inn), river in Tyrol, Austria
- Wilhelm Wattenbach (1819-1897), German historian
