= Viggarbach =

Viggarbach Mühlbach
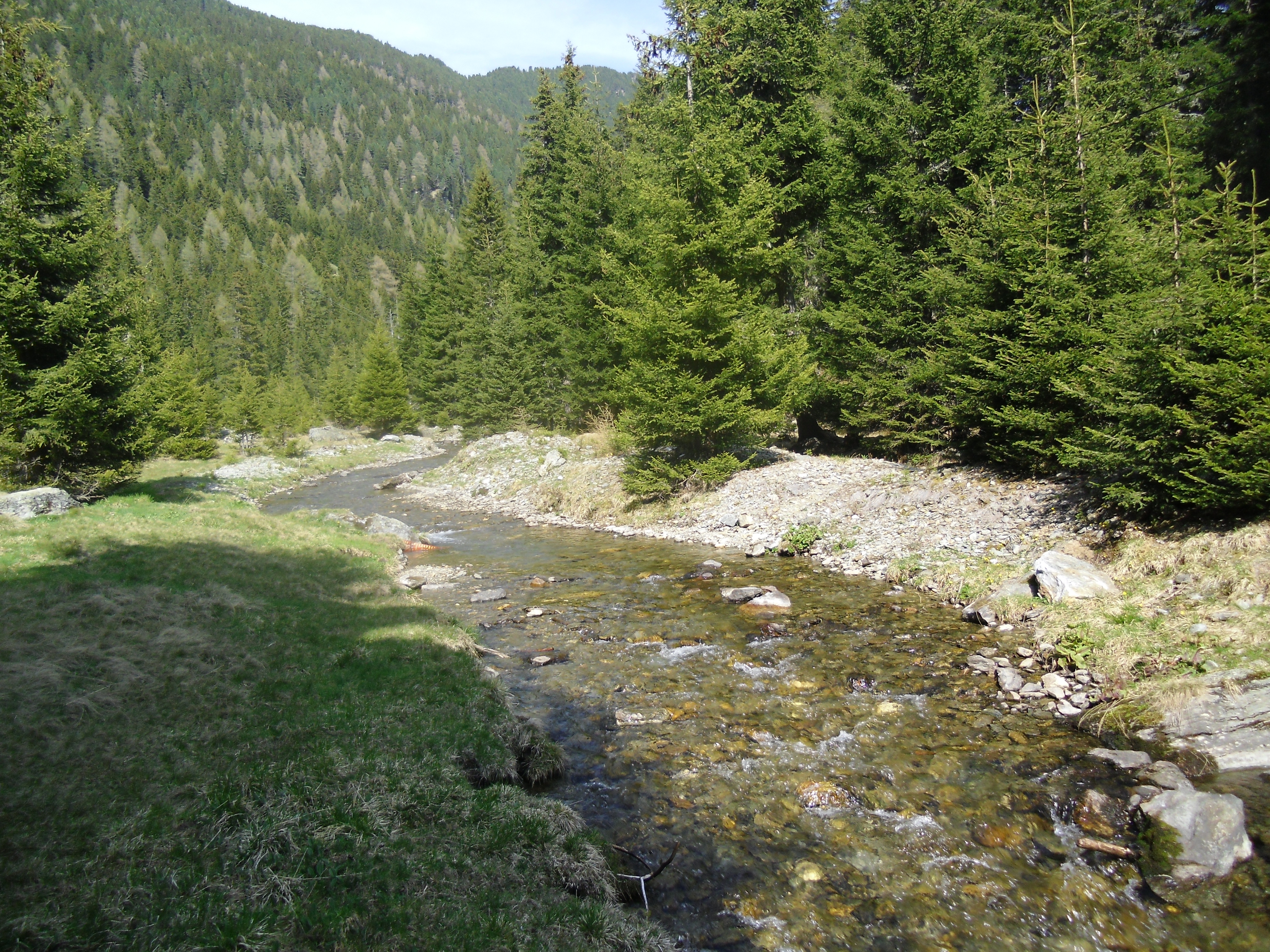

Location
- Country: Austria
- State: Tyrol

Physical characteristics
- Source
  - location: Blauer See
- Mouth
  - location: Sill near Schönberg im Stubaital
  - coordinates: 47.1769°N 11.4239°E
- Length: 10.1 km (6.3 mi)

Basin features
- Progression: Sill→ Inn→ Danube→ Black Sea

The Viggarbach (also: Mühlbach or Mühltaler Bach) is a river of Tyrol, Austria.

The Viggarbach's origin is the lake Blauer See. It flows through the valley with the same name in western direction and merges near Schönberg with the Sill. It has a length of 10.1 km (6.3 mi).

The rapid small creek keeps its Grade A water quality in the whole course, but gets dangerous at high water or strong rain. Because nearby townships are further away from the creek, there is less danger for settlements.

The Blauer See, the origin of the Viggarbach, has an area size of 0.79 ha (2.0 acres) and a volume of 23.570 m^{3} (832.4 cu ft), and lies on the frontier of the Tux Alps.
