= Mieders =

- Municipality
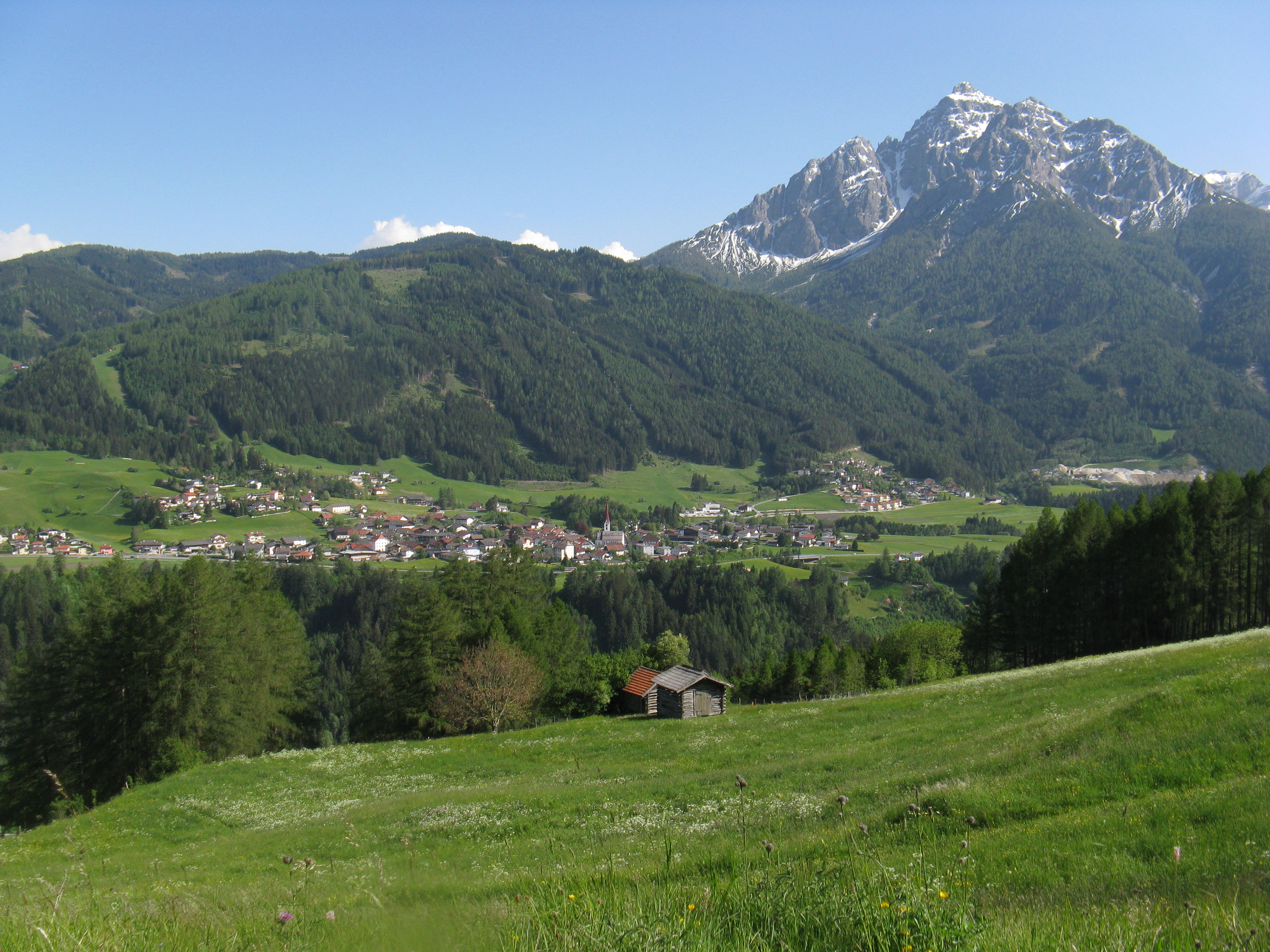

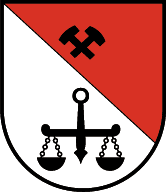
- Coat of arms

- Location within Austria
- Coordinates: 47°10′12″N 11°22′53″E
- Country: Austria
- State: Tyrol
- District: Innsbruck Land

Government
  - Mayor: Daniel Stern

Area
  - Total: 16.53 km^{2} (6.38 sq mi)
- Elevation: 952 m (3,123 ft)

Population (2021)
  - Total: 1,940
  - Density: 117/km^{2} (304/sq mi)
- Time zone: UTC+1 (CET)
  - Summer (DST): UTC+2 (CEST)
- Postal code: 6142
- Area code: 05225
- Vehicle registration: IL
- Website: www.mieders.net

Mieders is a municipality in the southern part of the district Innsbruck-Land in the Austrian state of Tyrol. It is located on the right side of the Stubaital 10.60 km south of Innsbruck.

== History ==
Founded in 1100, the scattered village is located on a gently rising slope of the valley at the foot of the 2718 m high Serles. Inhabited from the early Middle Ages, the centre has houses decorated with baroque frescoes.

== Population ==
Historical population
Year	Pop.	±%
1869	448	—
1880	399	−10.9%
1890	395	−1.0%
1900	390	−1.3%
1910	449	+15.1%
1923	440	−2.0%
1934	492	+11.8%
1939	503	+2.2%
1951	697	+38.6%
1961	587	−15.8%
1971	702	+19.6%
1981	952	+35.6%
1991	1,163	+22.2%
2001	1,592	+36.9%
2011	1,753	+10.1%

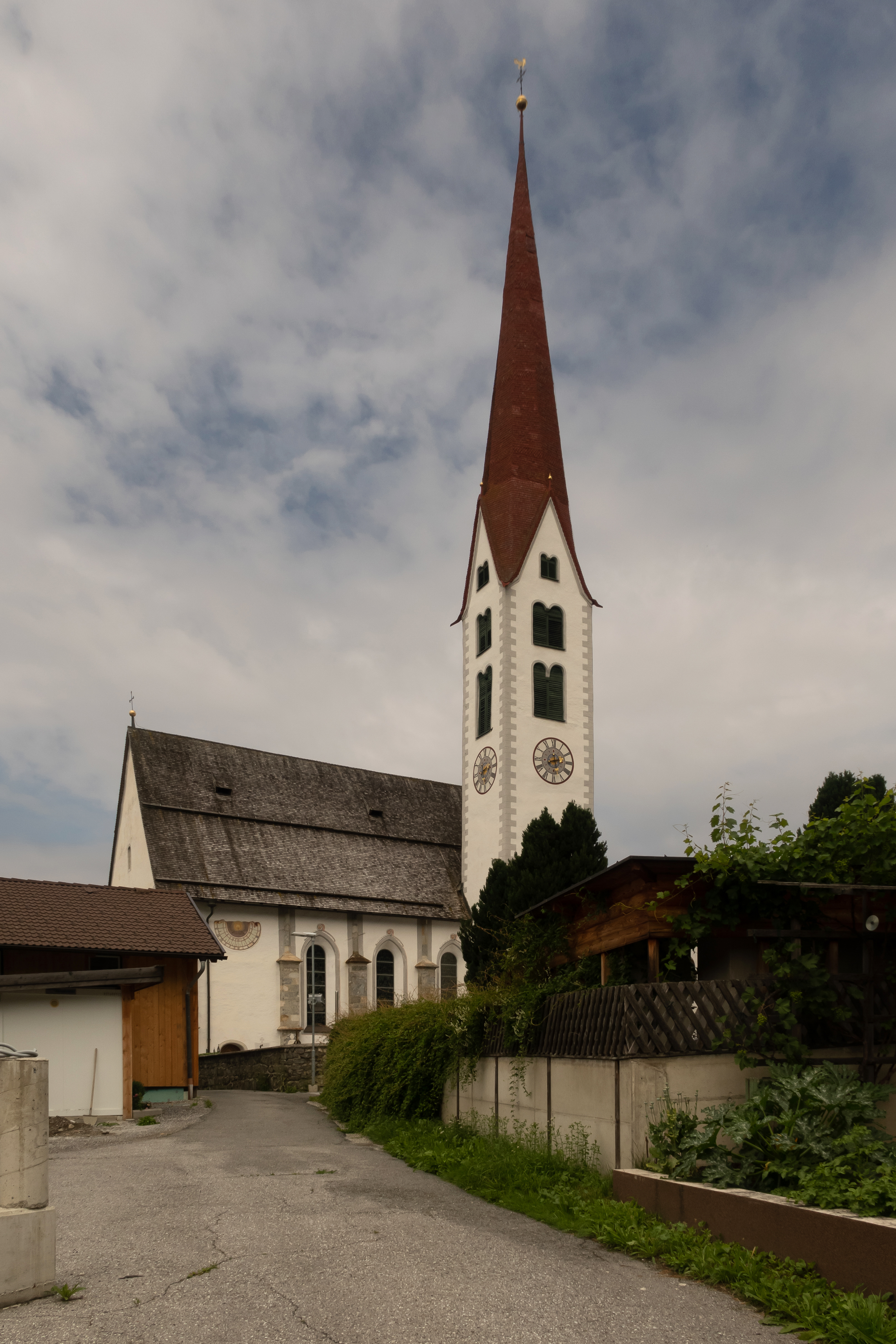
Mieders, church: katholische Pfarrkirche Mariä Geburt

== Tourism ==
Two seasonal tourist resorts are located directly at the bottom of the skiing and hiking area Serlesbahnen. The slopes are also known for a summer alpine coaster (monorail), which extends from the top station to the base station of the gondola, leading through the lower wooded slopes of the forest, parallel to the route of the cable car.

== Transportation ==
The town of Innsbruck is connected by a bus line.

== Neighboring municipalities ==
- Fulpmes
- Mühlbachl
- Schönberg im Stubaital
- Telfes
