= Kropfsberg Castle =

Castle ruin in Austria

- Burg Kropfsberg
- St. Gertraudi im Inntal
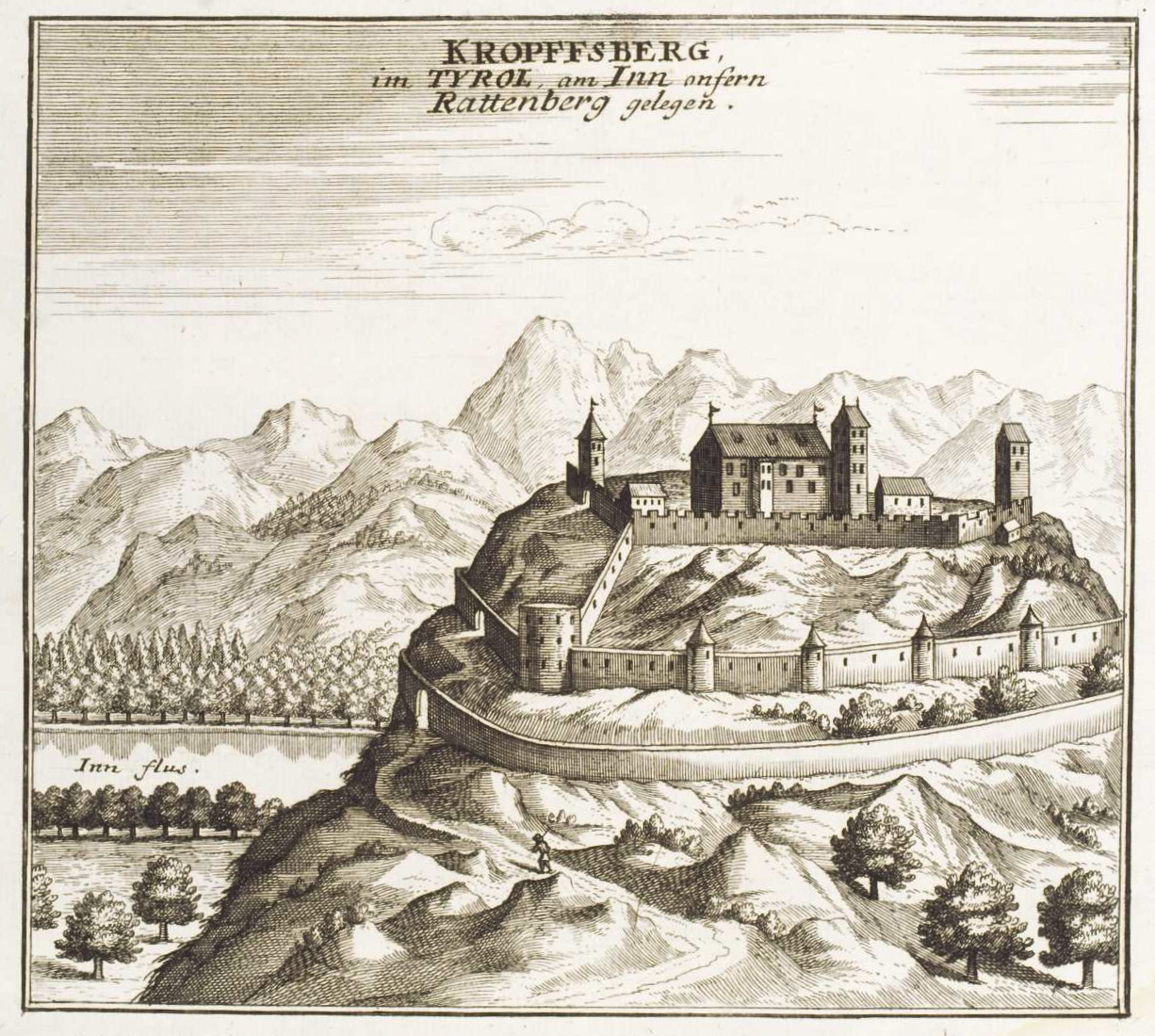
- Kropfsberg Castle 1700

Site information
- Type: hill castle
- Code: AT-7
- Condition: ruin

Location
- Location within Austria
- Coordinates: 47°24′26″N 11°50′48″E

Site history
- Built: 12th century

Kropfsberg Castle (German: Burg Kropfsberg) is a castle in Tyrol, Austria that stands at 526 metres (1,726 ft) above sea level.

Kropfsberg is a ruined hill castle in the municipality of Reith im Alpbachtal on a towering ridge in the Inn Valley above the village of St. Gertraudi. It was the setting for a ghost story by Ralph Adams Cram.

== History ==
From the Middle Ages large parts of the Zillertal belonged to the Prince-Archbishopric of Salzburg. Under Archbishop Konrad I of Salzburg, the first castle was built in the first half of the 12th century at the entrance to the Zillertal valley. Presumably it was just a tower surrounded by walls. The castle was used by the archbishops as the seat of the Salzburg court and the administration. Kropfsberg was first documented in 1286.

Archbishop Eberhard II von Regensburg continued to expand the castle. The castle owes this extension measures to its present appearance. Above the old tower was the main castle, which contained two mighty keeps.

In the 15th century the castle Kropfsberg was the venue of important negotiations. In 1412, a dispute between Tyrol and Bavaria was settled at the Imperial Diet. In 1416 there was reconciliation between Duke Frederick IV of Austria and his brother Duke Ernest of Inner Austria, in which Frederick secured the further possession of Tyrol.

In the course of time Kropfsberg was twice expanded in a Romanesque style, but there were no major Gothic construction activities. Archbishop Leonhard von Keutschach had the site rebuilt around 1500. 40 years later, the loop-shaped, 900 m (3,000 ft) long, 8 m (26 ft) tall and 3 m (9.8 ft) thick enceinte and the semicircular bastions were created.

In the following century Kropfsberg was one of the largest castles in Tyrol. It was protected by a double ring wall. This expansion was intended to further assert sovereign power and strength. It extended to an area of 26,000 m^{2} (280,000 sq ft), but only had accommodation for 60 to 80 people.

In the year 1592 the court seat of Kropfsberg was moved to Zell am Ziller, which led to the decline of the castle. As a result of the fact that the castle was only inhabited by people and was no longer maintained, the first buildings collapsed in 1673. During the Bavarian Rummel in 1703, the castle was drafted into the fighting with, as Bavarian soldiers had settled there. The Tyrolese shooters drove the invaders out again.

In 1809, during the Napoleonic wars, Tyrol briefly passed to Bavaria by the Treaty of Schönbrunn before being absorbed into Austria in 1814. The castle complex shared the same fate as many others and the now ruined castle was auctioned off. In 1850, the gate tower was renovated to make it habitable again. In 1905 the material of the still preserved ring wall was reused.

In 1940, the Meraner Sepp Auffinger bought the property. He had the gate tower renovated again. In the last year of the Second World War, the western Palamau collapsed due to bombardment in the vicinity. The castle ruins have been preserved and restored since 1985. Therefore, even today remains of the cistern and the Gothic castle chapel are preserved. Today, the castle is privately owned by Hanno Vogl-Fernheim.

== Description ==
A prehistoric hilltop settlement with shallow ramparts and small terraces was largely destroyed by the overbuilding of the medieval castle. [1] The castle with its three towers of almost equal height is unique in Tyrol. From the first castle, only the west-facing freestanding tower remains. Built around a hexagonal courtyard, the Romanesque stronghold dates back to the second building, of which only the two keepers still exist. The middle tower has only light slots in the lower area. The residential floors with their large windows and different masonry were set up by Archbishop Leonhard. The keep was rebuilt after the Second World War to lookout tower. Furthermore, the remains of the 16th-century Rupertus Chapel are still there. The 47 m deep cistern is located in the middle of the yard. The outer ring wall together with the bastions is still partially preserved.

== See also ==
- List of castles in Austria
