= Stubaier Bauerntheater =

Peasant theatre in the Tyrol of Austria

Coordinates: 47.1531°N 11.3488°E

The Stubaier Bauerntheater is one of the oldest peasant theatres in the Tyrol region of Austria. The theatre group was founded by Ludwig Hupfauf and Hans Klingenschmid in 1903, in the town of Fulpmes in the Stubai Valley. Hupfauf led the association as chairman for more than half a century, but was also playwright, director and, from 1961, also active as an actor. Klingenschmid died in 1934.

The theatre venue is the Fulpmes Community Hall, at Riehlstraße 3, 6166 Fulpmes.

The theatre puts on a wide range of plays including dramas and comedies, and has evolved from originally performing plays with rural themes to more modern plays. In 2021 the Stubaier Bauerntheater put on a performance of Max Neal's The Sinful Village.

== Chairmen ==
- 1903–1953 - Ludwig Hupfauf
- 1953–1983 - Hans Bichler
- 1983–2007 - Herbert Mair
- from 2007 - Michael Pfurtscheller
