= Pfons =

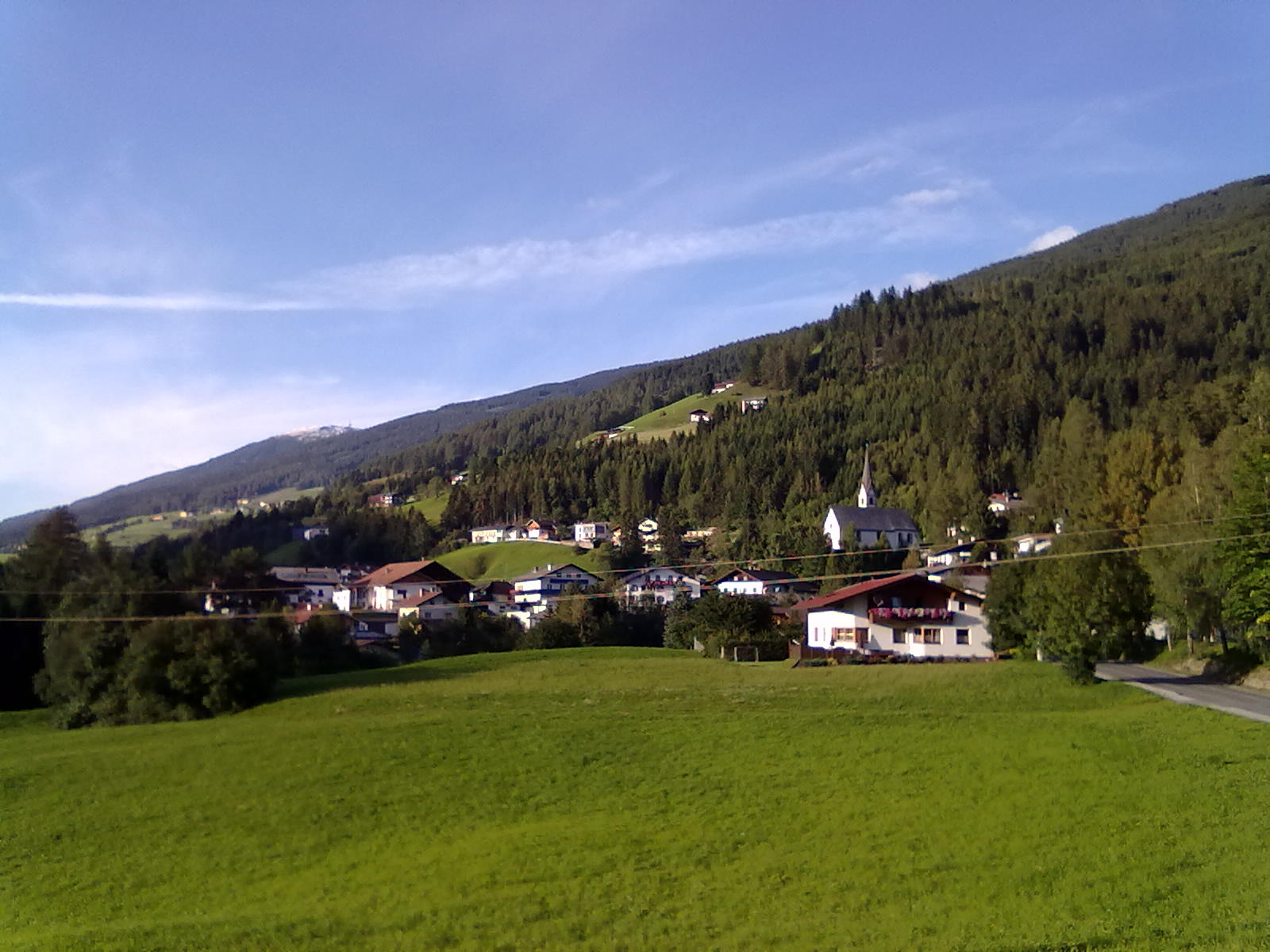

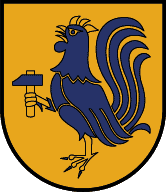
- Coat of arms

- Location within Austria
- Coordinates: 47°08′33″N 11°27′38″E
- Country: Austria
- State: Tyrol
- District: Innsbruck Land

Government
  - Mayor: Argen Woertz

Area
  - Total: 21.72 km^{2} (8.39 sq mi)
- Elevation: 1,043 m (3,422 ft)

Population (2018-01-01)
  - Total: 1,205
  - Density: 55.48/km^{2} (143.7/sq mi)
- Time zone: UTC+1 (CET)
  - Summer (DST): UTC+2 (CEST)
- Postal code: 6143
- Area code: 05273
- Vehicle registration: IL
- Website: www.pfons.tirol.gv.at

Pfons was a municipality in the district of Innsbruck-Land in the Austrian state of Tyrol located 13.7 km south of Innsbruck in the Wipptal at the Sill River.

== History ==
Although it is not exactly clear where the name of the village comes from, the location was first mentioned as “Phunzun” in 1030 and later as “Phanes” in 1177. Formerly a part of Matrei am Brenner, Pfons was declared as independent in 1811. On 1 January 2022 Pfons and Mühlbachl were merged into the municipality of Matrei am Brenner.

== Population ==
Historical population
Year	Pop.	±%
1869	397	—
1880	391	−1.5%
1890	379	−3.1%
1900	390	+2.9%
1910	390	+0.0%
1923	429	+10.0%
1934	447	+4.2%
1939	434	−2.9%
1951	513	+18.2%
1961	538	+4.9%
1971	763	+41.8%
1981	963	+26.2%
1991	1,183	+22.8%
2001	1,242	+5.0%
2011	1,221	−1.7%
