= Bavarian Rummel =

Part of the War of the Spanish Succession (1703)

The Bavarian Rummel (German: Bayrischer Rummel; Bavarian: Boarischer Rummel) was the term used to downplay (Rummel means 'hustle and bustle') the warlike events in which Bavarian troops of Elector Maximilian II Emanuel invaded the County of Tyrol in 1703 during the War of the Spanish Succession.

== Chronology ==
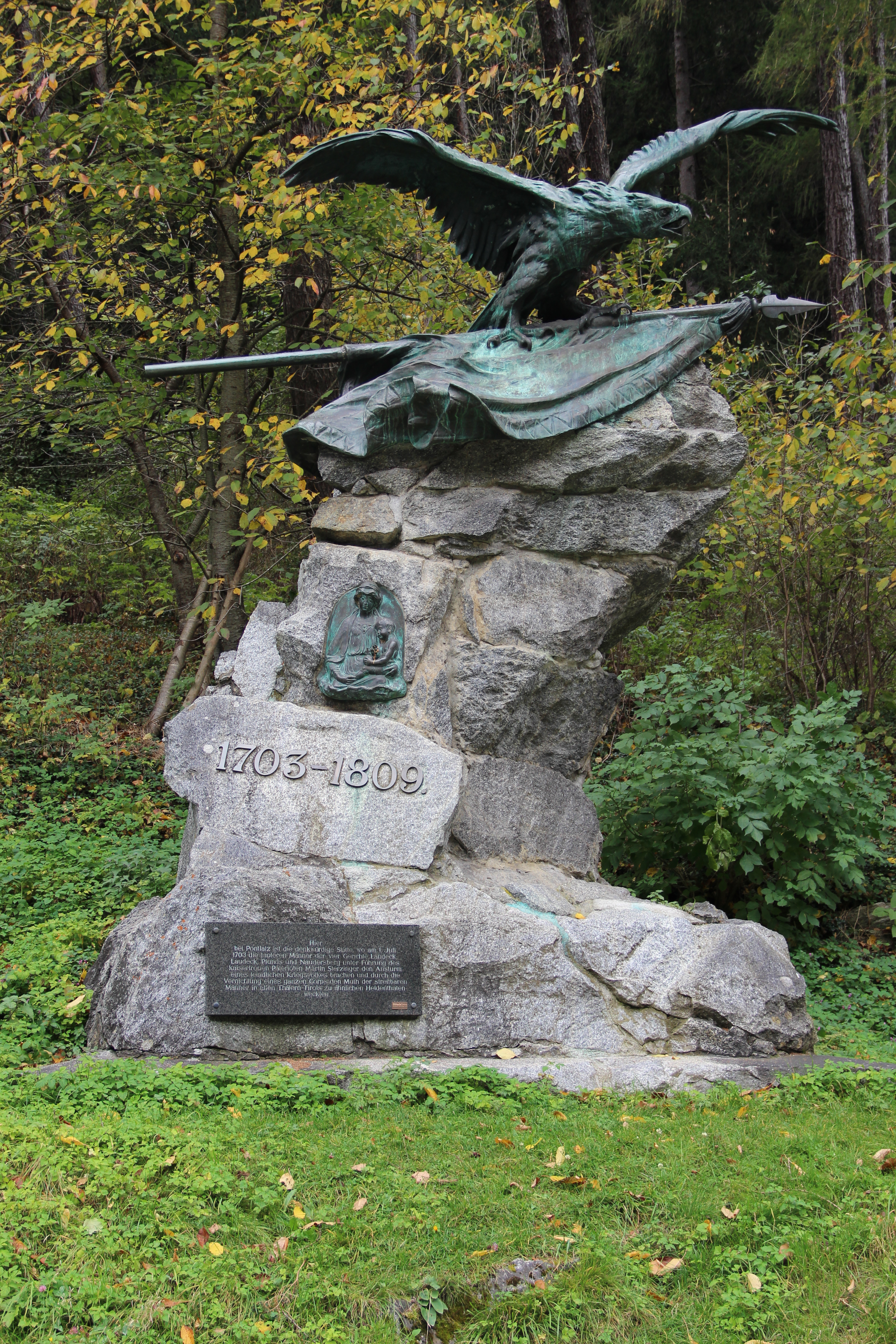
Monument near the Pontlatzer Bridge

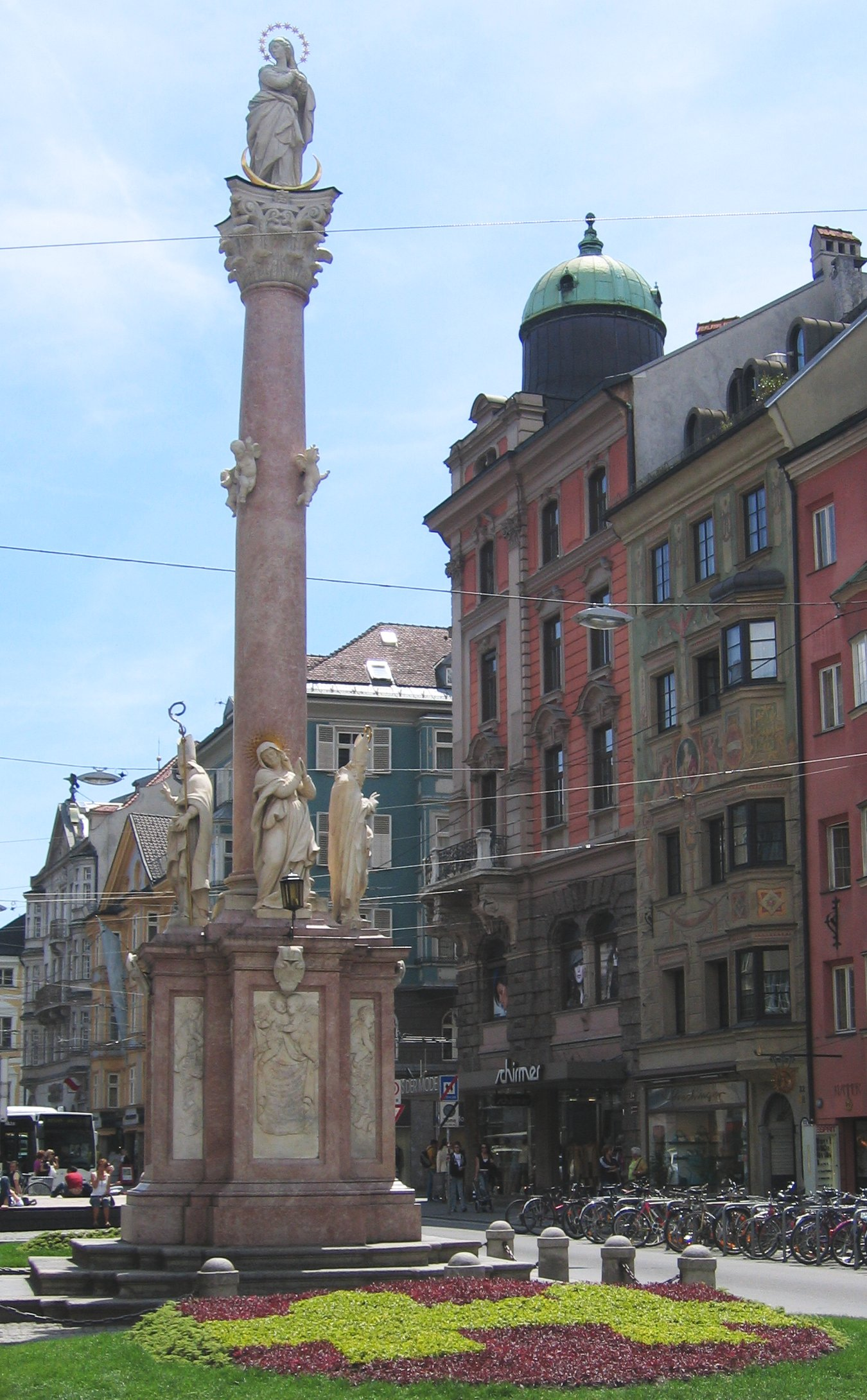
St. Anne's Column in Innsbruck

On 19 June 1703, Bavarian troops besieged Kufstein. Fires broke out on the outskirts of the town, which engulfed the town itself, destroyed it and reached the powder store of the supposedly impregnable fortress. The enormous supplies of gunpowder exploded and Kufstein surrendered on 20 June. That same day, the Tyrolese surrendered in Wörgl; two days later Rattenberg was captured and Innsbruck was cleared on 25 June without a fight. But the Bavarians then suffered reverses at the hands of the Tyrolese on 1 July at the Pontlatzer Bridge in the upper Inn Valley, at the Brenner Pass and near Innsbruck. On 26 July, Saint Anne's Day, Tyrol was freed again and Maximilian Emanuel retreated to Bavaria via Seefeld in Tirol.

In 2011, during construction work in Pfons in the Wipptal valley, graves were uncovered, which were presumably those of Bavarian soldiers, who were not buried in the cemetery, but in threes near the river bank. The theory rests on clues that were mentioned in the local chronicle of Matrei am Brenner.

== Tradition ==
In gratitude for their freedom, in 1704 the Landstände pledged to have a St. Anne's Column built and this was erected in Innsbruck in 1706.

The Bavarian Rummel forms – together with the struggle for Tyrolean freedom in 1809, which regularly overshadows it both in expert and public discourse – was an important element of Tyrolean historical consciousness and Tyrolean identity and made a lasting contribution to the creation of the image of the "fighting Tyrolean farmer".

== Literature ==
- Martin P. Schennach, Richard Schober (eds.): 1703. Der „bayerische Rummel“ in Tirol. Wagner Verlag, Innsbruck, 2005, ISBN 3-7030-0395-2.
- Florian Schaffenrath, Stefan Tilg (translation and commentary): Achilles in Tirol (The "bayerische Rummel" of 1703 in the "Epitome rerum Oenovallensium" [...]), Tirolensia Latina 2004, ISBN 3-7030-0386-3. The Latin book which appeared anonymously in 1710 in Amsterdam recounts the events of 1703 in great detail, but in coded form (Max Emanuel, for example, is Achilles, Tyrolis is Lothyris), which the translator was able to almost entirely solve.
