= Hotel Krone =

Hotel in Matrei am Brenner, Austria

- Industry: Hotel
- Founded: 1447
- Headquarters: Brennerstraße 54-56, 6143 Matrei am Brenner, Tyrol (state), Austria
- Key people: Familie von Stadler
- Website: www.krone-matrei.at

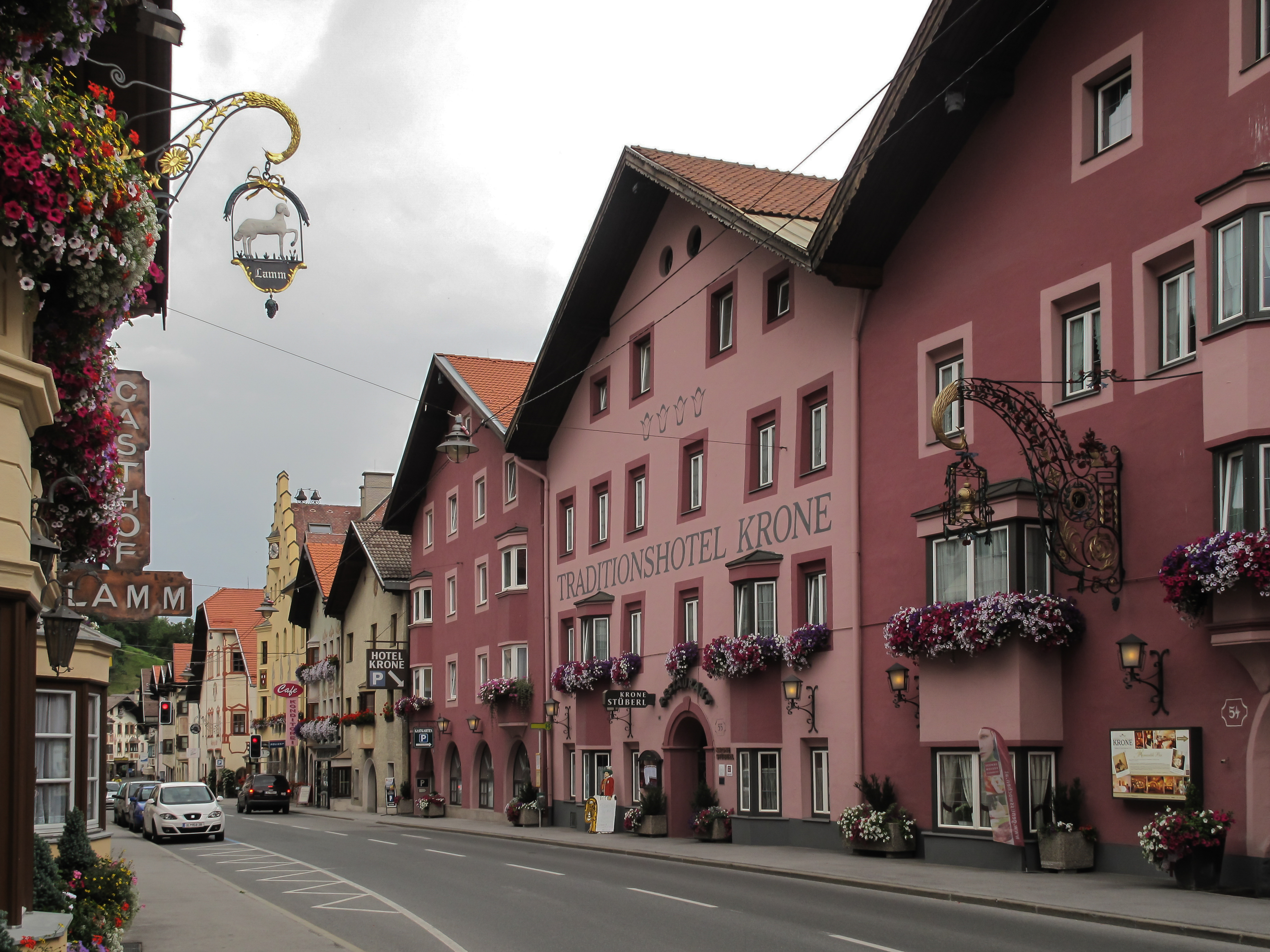
Street view of the hotel

Hotel Krone is a traditional hotel in Matrei am Brenner, Austria founded in 1447.

The hotel building has a more than 1000 years history and always was in family ownership.

== See also ==
- List of oldest companies
