= Navisbach =

Location
- Country: Austria
- State: Tyrol

Physical characteristics
- Source
  - location: Tux Alps
- Mouth
  - location: Sill
  - coordinates: 47.1156°N 11.4547°E
- Length: 13 km (8.1 mi)

Basin features
- Progression: Sill→ Inn→ Danube→ Black Sea

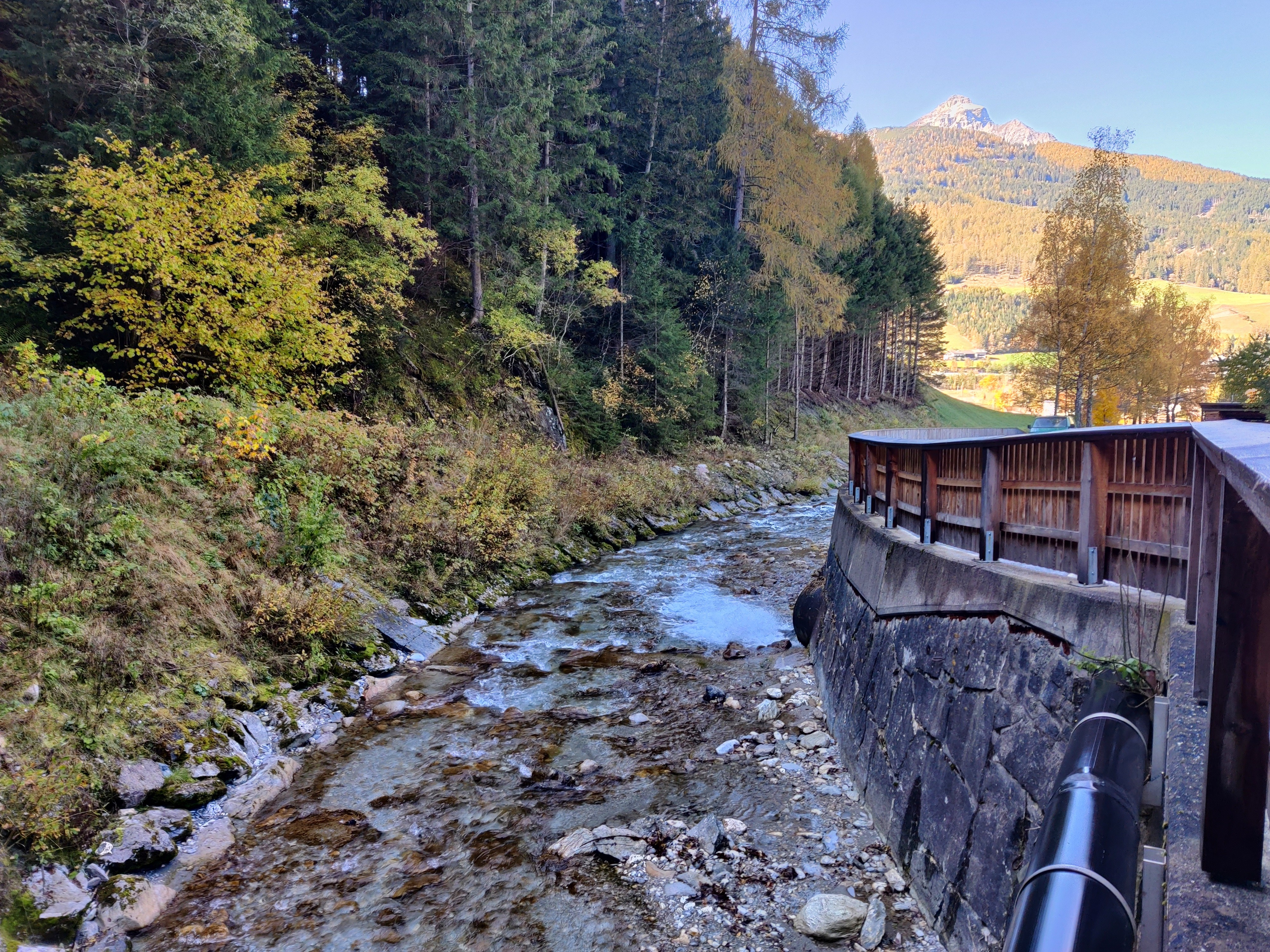

The Navisbach is a small river of Tyrol, Austria.

The Navisbach flows through the Navistal (Navis valley). Its route follows western direction until north of Steinach am Brenner where it merges with the Sill. The Navisbach proper is 7.2 km (4.5 mi) long, including its source river Klammbach it is about 13 km (8.1 mi) long.

The Navisbach is one of the cleanest waters in Tyrol and has Grade A− quality. It provides the village of Navis (in the center of the valley) with drinking water.
