= St. Anne's Column =

Public war memorial and monument in Maria-Theresien-Straße

- Annasäule (German)
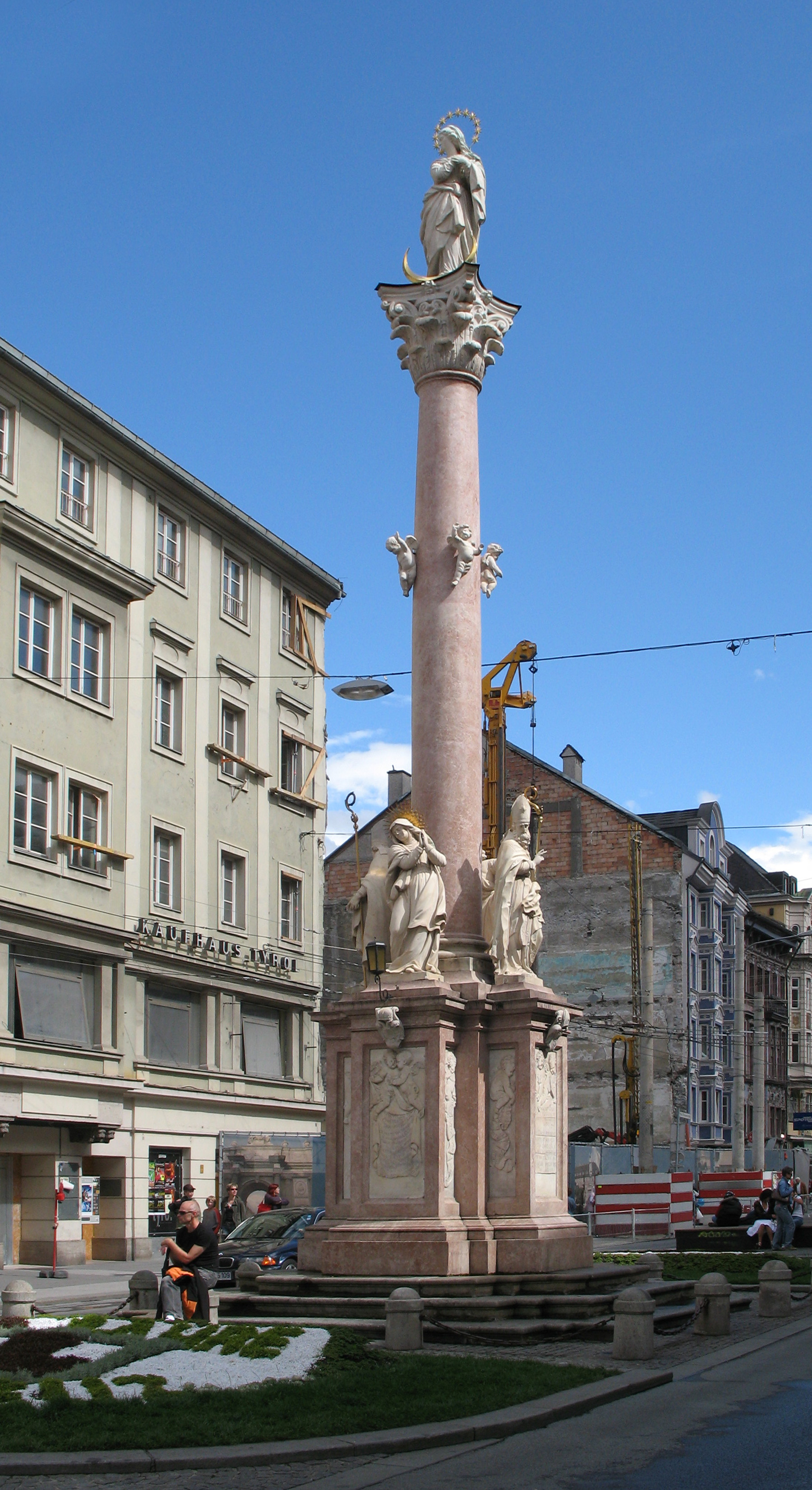
- St. Anne's Column in Innsbruck's city centre

- Artist: Cristoforo Benedetti
- Year: 1703
- Medium: Red Kramsach marble
- Subject: Four statues of saints
- Location: Maria-Theresien-Straße; Innsbruck; 47°15′56″N 11°23′39″E

St. Anne's Column (German: Annasäule) stands in the city centre of Innsbruck, Austria, on Maria-Theresien-Straße.

It was given its name when, in 1703, the last Bavarian troops were driven from the Tyrol on Saint Anne's Day (26 July), as part of the War of the Spanish Succession. In 1704, in gratitude, the Landstände vowed to build a monument commemorating the event.

The column was made from red Kramsach marble to the design of Cristoforo Benedetti, a sculptor from Trento. On the base are four statues of saints:

- In the north, Saint Anne, the mother of the Virgin Mary
- In the west, Cassian, patron saint of the Diocese of Bozen-Brixen.
- In the east, Vigilius, patron saint of the Diocese of Trento.
- In the south, Saint George, patron saint of the Tyrol.

Towering above these four statues is the column with its statue of the Virgin as the Woman of the Apocalypse, rising 13 meters (42 feet) from the street.

The column was consecrated on 26 July 1706 by Prince-Bishop Kaspar Ignaz, Count of Künigl. It has been restored several times over the centuries. In 1958, mainly for conservation reasons, the figure of Mary was replaced by a replica and the original was loaned to the Abbey of St. Georgenberg-Fiecht, where it has been placed in a side chapel of the abbey church of Fiecht (near Schwaz) above Saint Mary's altar.

On 10 October 2009 the figures of saints on the base of the monument were also substituted; the originals are now on the first floor of the Altes Landhaus in Innsbruck.

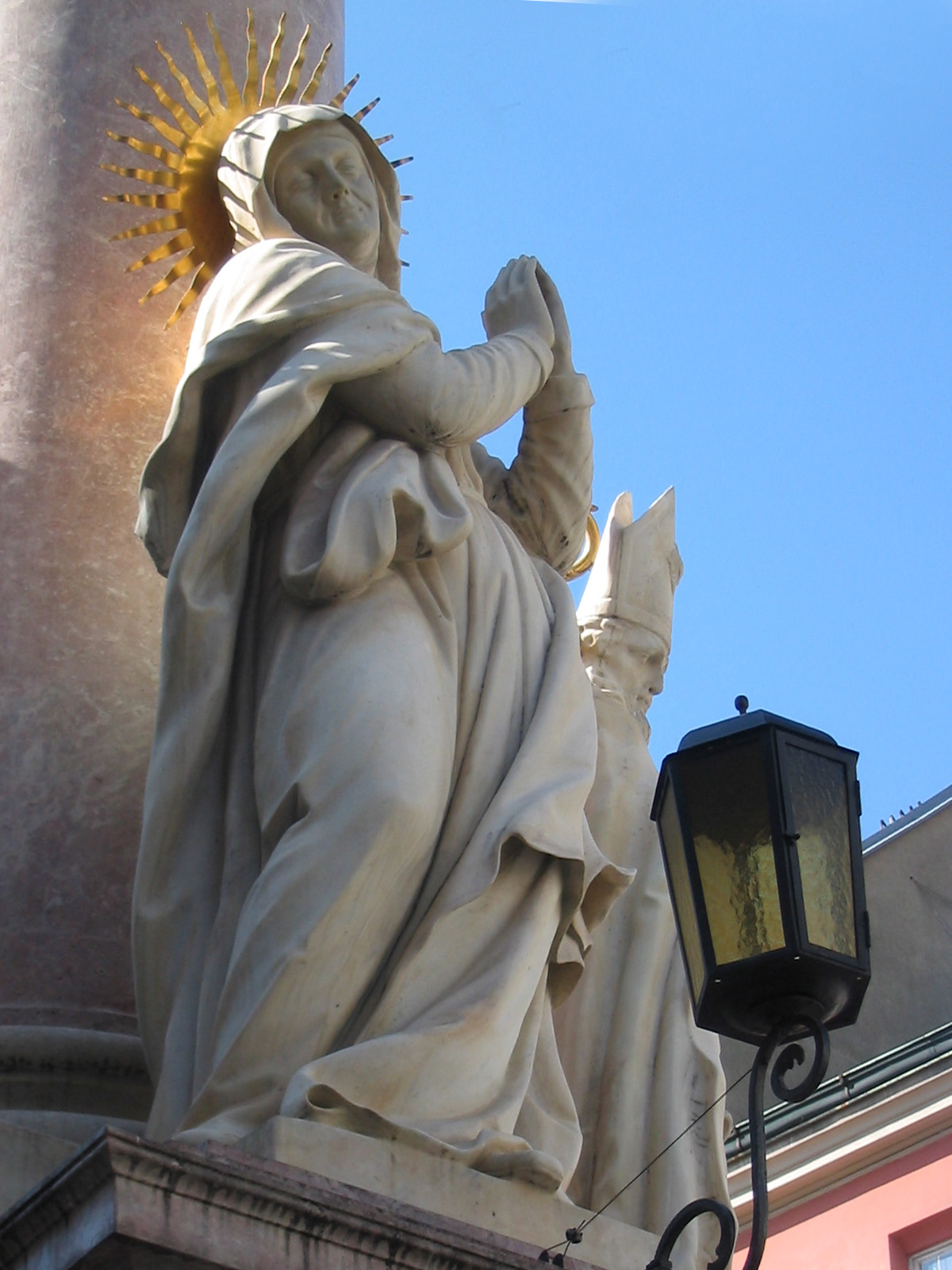
Saint Anne

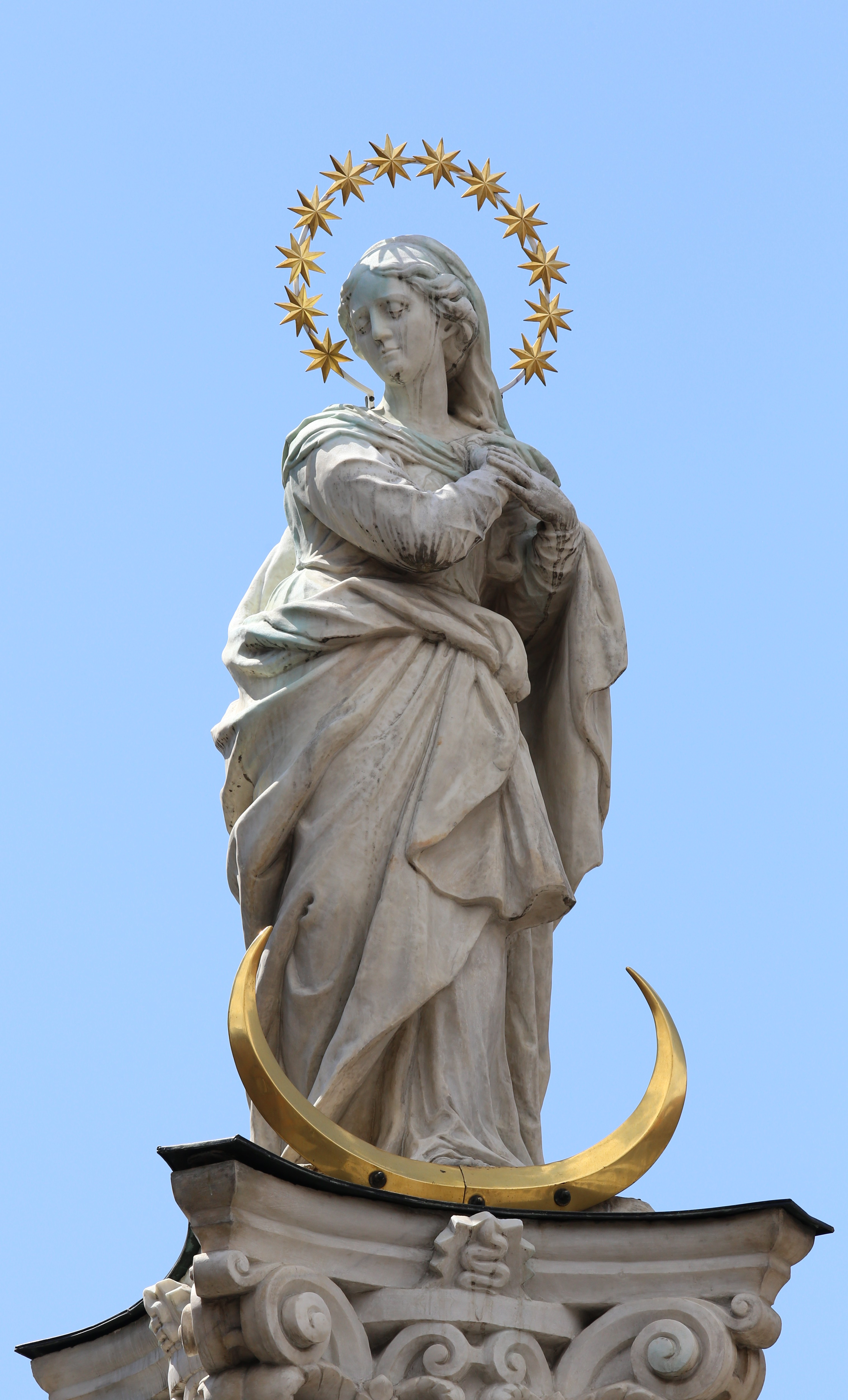
Statue of Mary,
since 1958

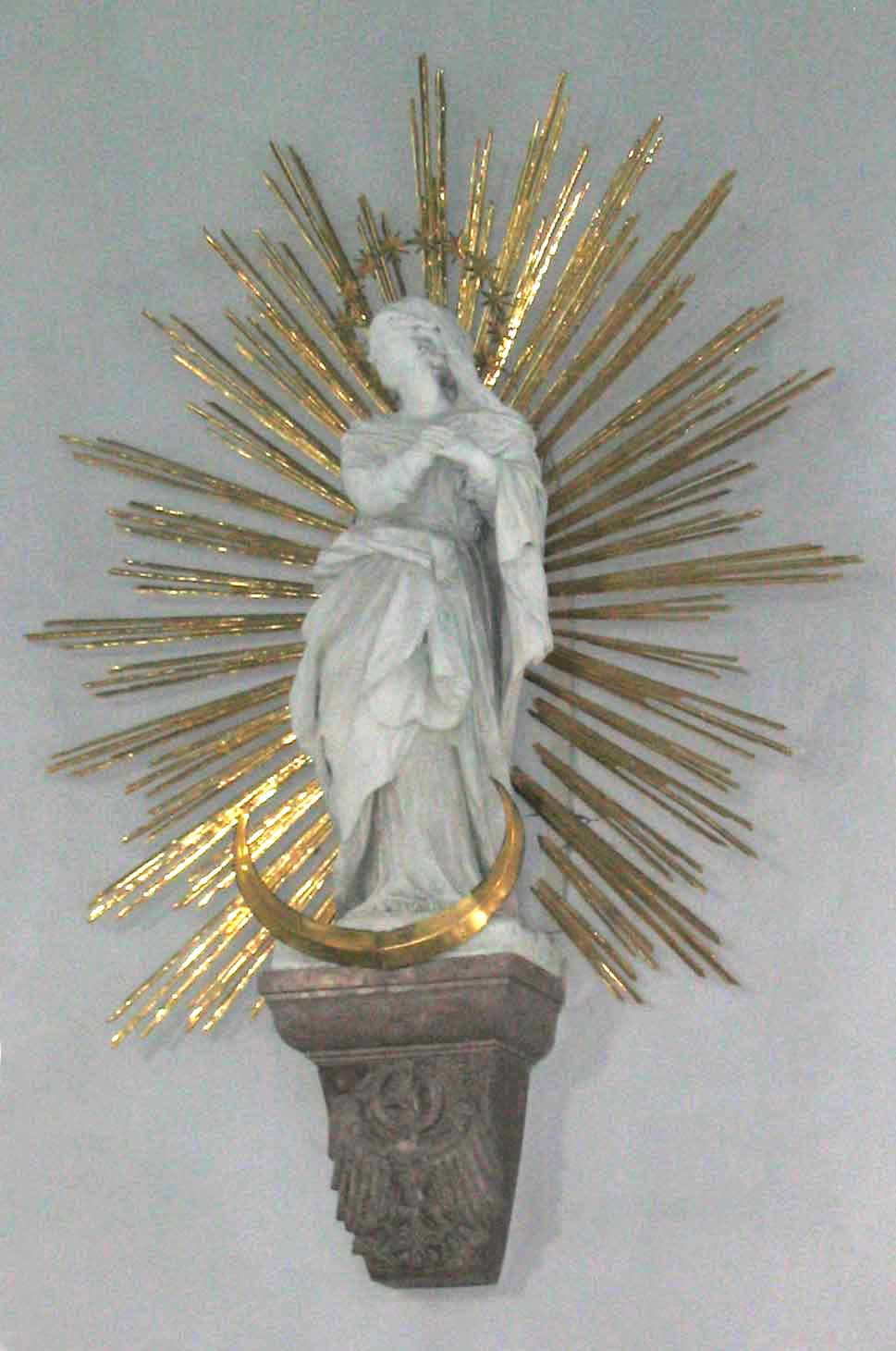
Original statue of Mary by Benedetti, 1706

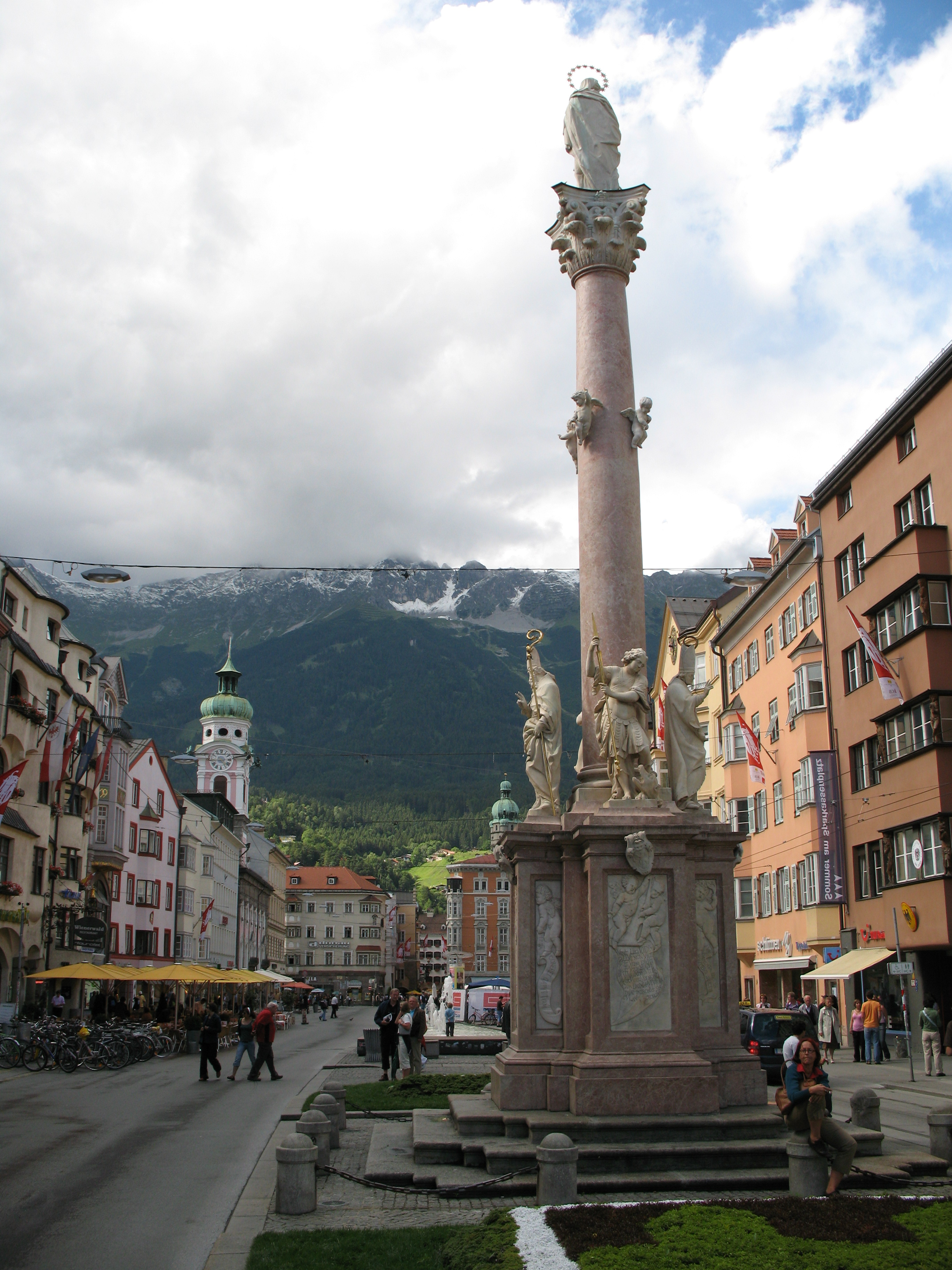
St. Anne's Column from the south, with the Nordkette mountain chain behind

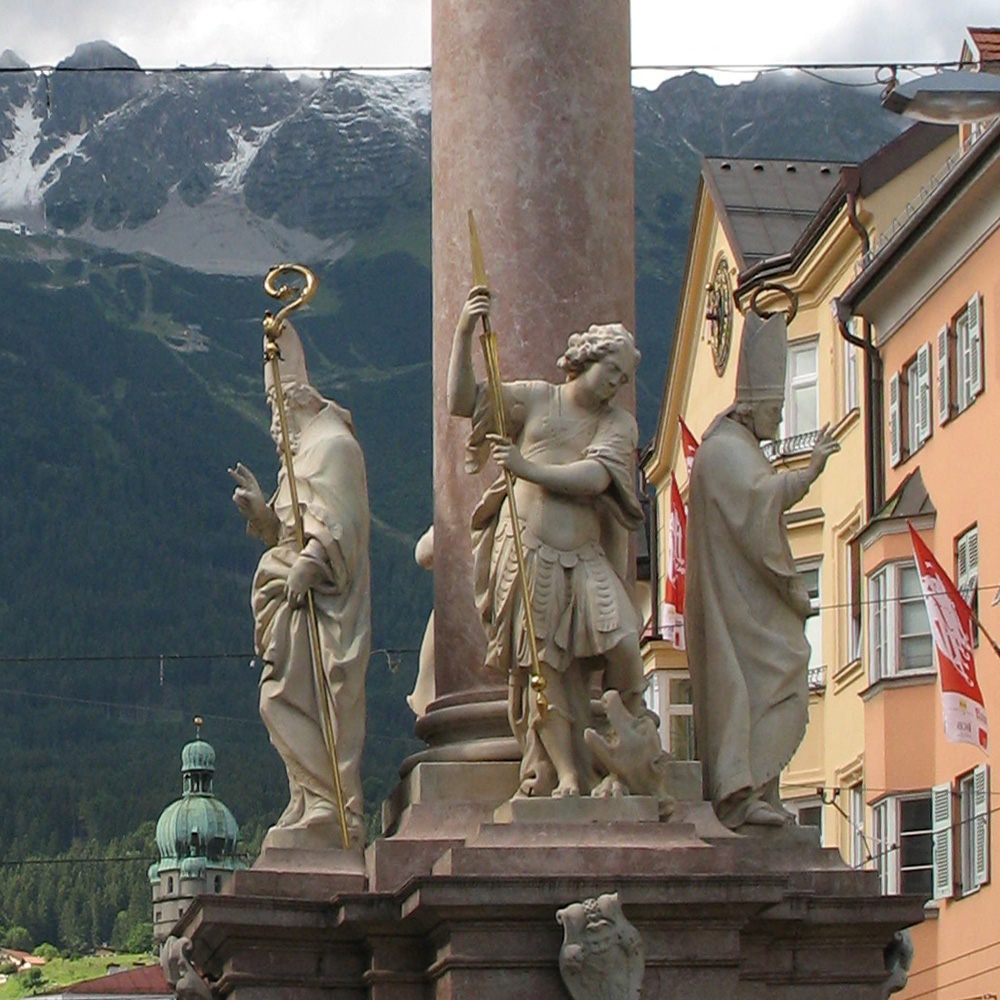
From the south (from left to right): Saints Cassian, George and Vigilius

== See also ==
- Bavarian Rummel
