= Wattenbach (Inn) =

Wattenbach Wattenerbach
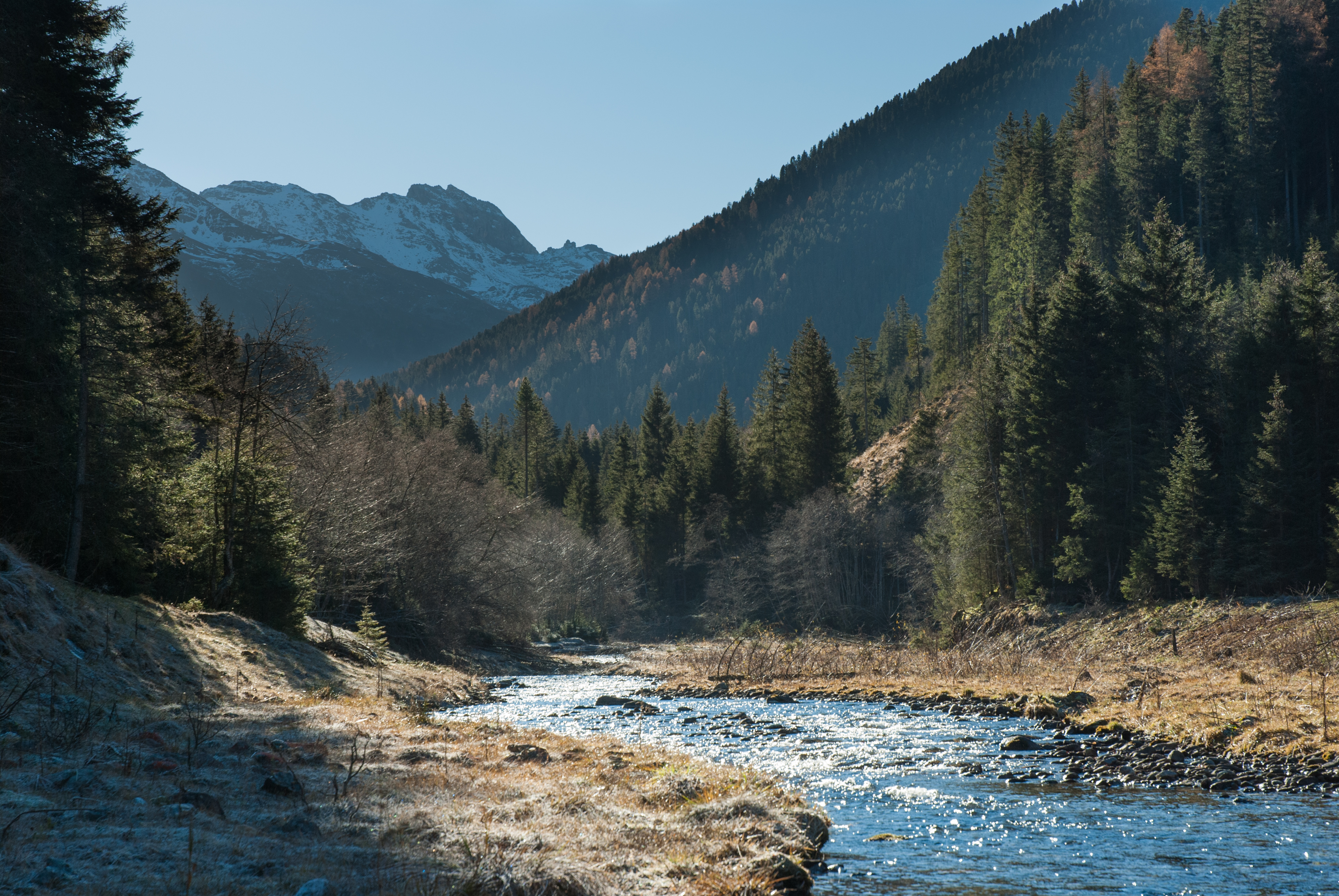

Location
- Country: Austria
- State: Tyrol

Physical characteristics
- Source
  - location: Confluence of the Mölsbach and Lizumbach in the Tux Prealps
- Mouth
  - location: Into the Inn near Wattens
  - coordinates: 47.3006°N 11.5917°E
- Length: 11.5 km (7.1 mi)

Basin features
- Progression: Inn→ Danube→ Black Sea

The Wattenbach or Wattenerbach is a river of Tyrol, Austria, a tributary of the Inn.

The Wattenbach has its origin in the Tux Prealps. The rivers Mölsbach and Lizumbach merge in the valley bottom near Lager Walchen at a height of 1,410 m (AA) thus forming the origin of the Wattenbach. It then flows from the Wattentaler Lizum almost due north through the Wattental valley. After 11.5 kilometres (7.1 mi) it empties near Wattens into the Inn.

== Water quality ==
Until the river reaches Wattens the water has grade A quality. The small village Wattenberg diverts their wastewater into the sewage works of Fritzens. The water of the Wattenbach is used by the companies Swarovski and Wattenspapier. Although the water is cleaned through several sewage treatment plants the Inn suffers from the polluted water. Only the heavy metal pollution could be reduced strongly. Several constructed defence structures have also successfully been avoiding high water.

== Usage ==
Nine power plants use the water furthermore intensively and the water also is used by industry facilities. Therefore, sometimes very little water runs and the brook is threatened by desiccation.
