= Stubaital =

Valley in Tyrol, Austria

Stubai Valley
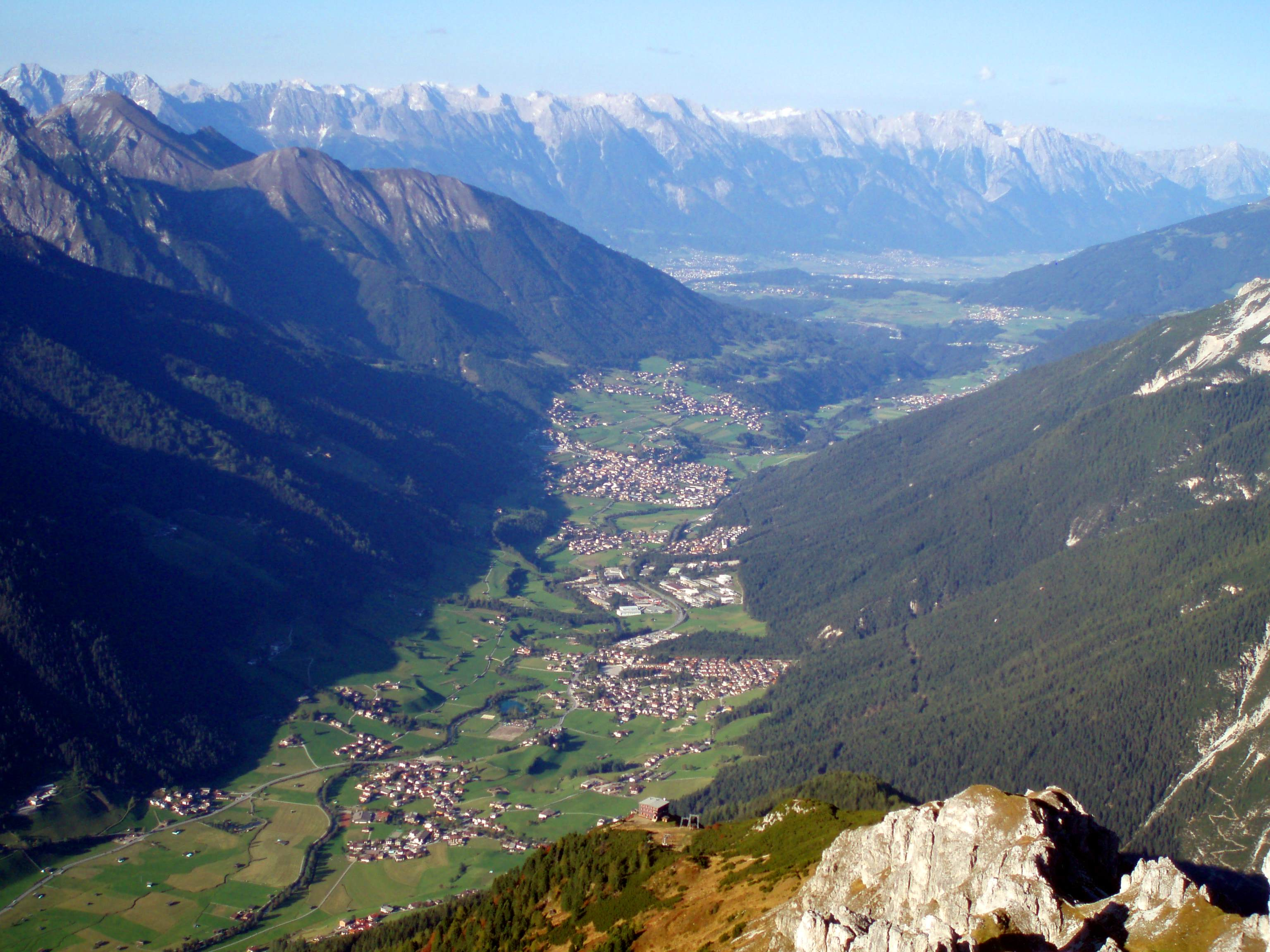
- View from the Elfer valleywards
- Floor elevation: 900–1,700 m (3,000–5,600 ft)
- Length: 35 km (22 mi)

Naming
- Native name: Stubaital (German)

Geography
- Location: Tyrol, Austria
- Coordinates: 47°8′50″N 11°20′49″E
- Mountain range: Stubai Alps
- River: Ruetz
- Interactive map of Stubai Valley

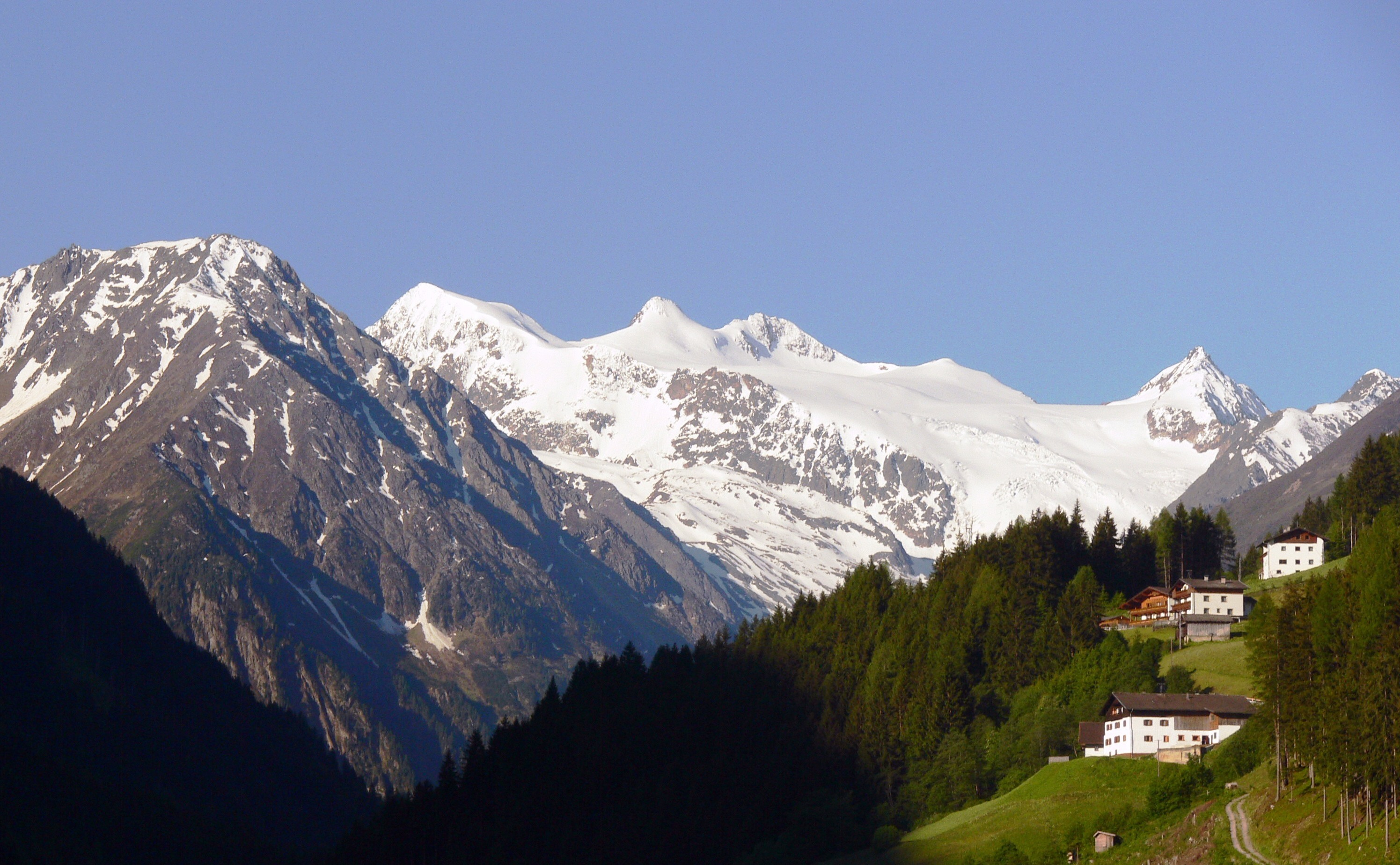
Stubaital and the glacier Sulzenauferner in Tyrol, Austria

The Stubai Valley or Stubaital (German pronunciation: [ˈʃtuːbaɪ̯ˌtaːl]) is an alpine valley in Tyrol, Austria. It is the central valley of the Stubai Alps. The river Ruetz flows through the valley.

This 35-km long valley runs in northeastern direction from the main chain of the Alps to Schönberg im Stubaital, near Innsbruck. Below Fulpmes, the villages lie on terraces above the Ruetz on either side of the river. South of Neustift im Stubaital, the largest side valley Oberbergtal joins from the west. The ÖBB operates a 16-MW hydroelectric power plant in Fulpmes.

The following five municipalities lie in the valley: Schönberg im Stubaital, Mieders, Telfes, Fulpmes and Neustift im Stubaital. Public transportation from Innsbruck into the valley is available via the Stubaital bus route or the Stubai Valley Railway, which runs from Innsbruck to Fulpmes.

At the end of the Stubaital valley, the Stubai Glacier is used as a ski resort.
