= Matrei am Brenner =

- Municipality
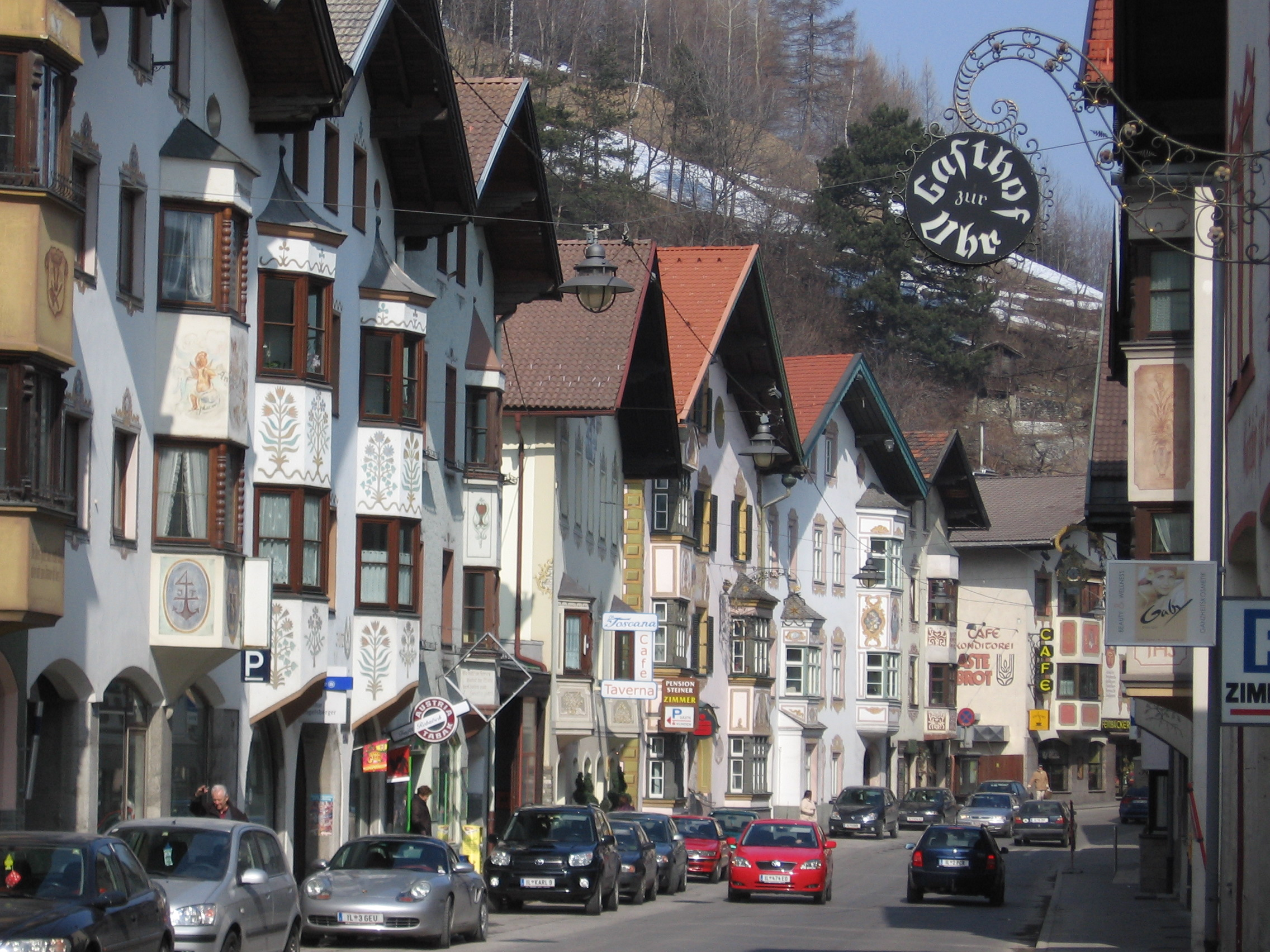

- Coat of arms

- Location within Austria
- Coordinates: 47°07′51″N 11°27′11″E
- Country: Austria
- State: Tyrol
- District: Innsbruck Land

Government
  - Mayor: Patrick Geir (TEAM GEIER)

Area
  - Total: 0.36 km^{2} (0.14 sq mi)
- Elevation: 992 m (3,255 ft)

Population (2021)
  - Total: 918
  - Density: 2,500/km^{2} (6,600/sq mi)
- Time zone: UTC+1 (CET)
  - Summer (DST): UTC+2 (CEST)
- Postal code: 6143
- Area code: 05273
- Vehicle registration: IL
- Website: www.matrei-brenner.tirol.gv.at

Matrei am Brenner is a small municipality in the southern part of the District Innsbruck-Land and is located approximately 17 km south of Innsbruck. Matrei has always been an important station for commerce. On 1 January 2022 the municipalities of Pfons and Mühlbachl were merged into Matrei. The village has 3,500 inhabitants, at 992 m. above sea level and the Sill river flows through it.

== Geography ==
At Mühlbachl, the road branches off to the north, one follows the valley along the river to get to Innsbruck, the other on the eastern shore, with a more circuitous route through Patsch, Lans and Ampass, comes up to Hall in Tirol. The first was the way, covered by the Germanic Sovereigns of the Holy Roman Empire, through the Scharnitz pass, to Rome for the coronation.

== History ==
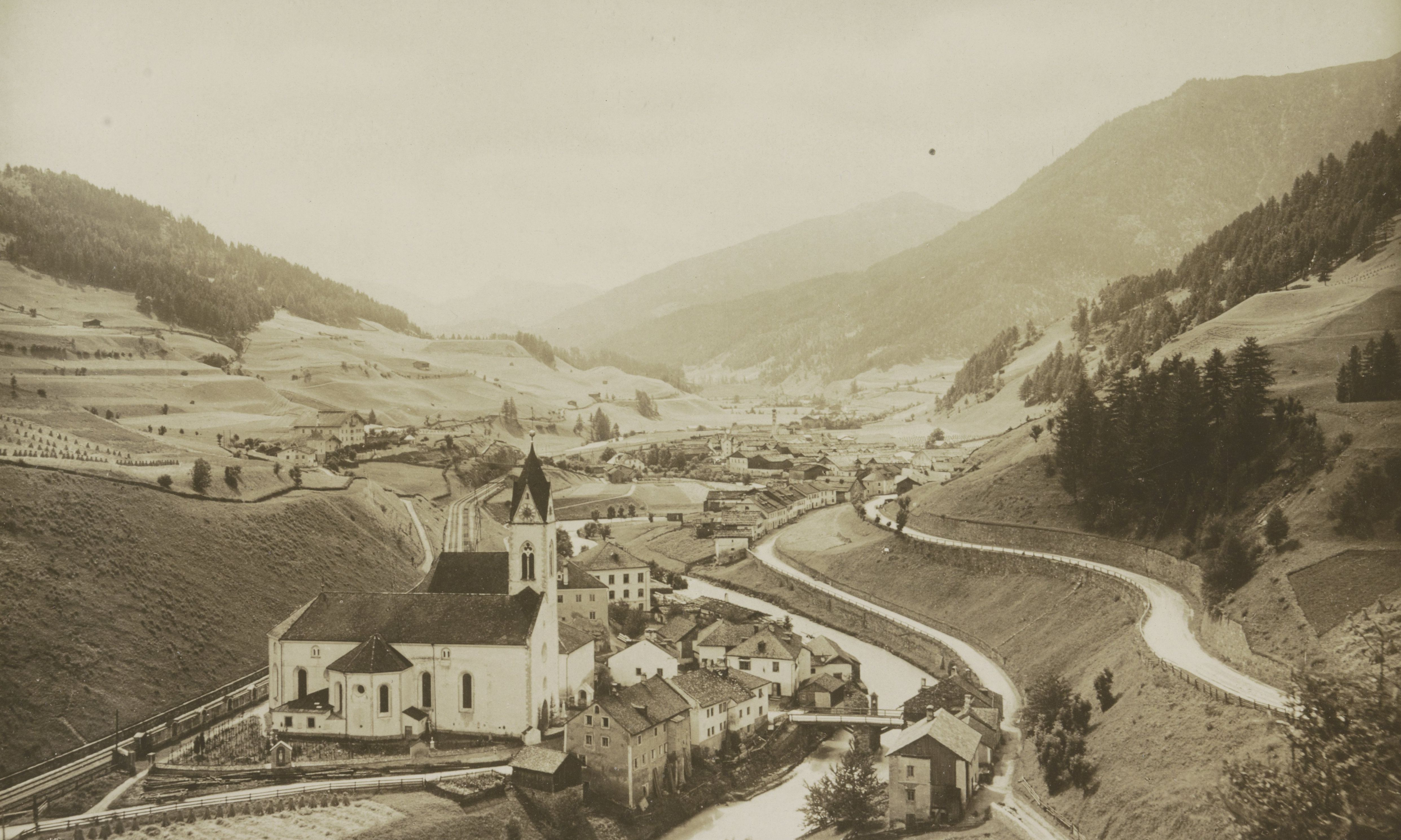
19th-century photo

The place was inhabited in the late Bronze Age (1200 BC) as shown by the remains discovered in the area and by signs of Hallstatt culture. In 1964 during work at "Gasthof Heisenstecken" a hundred urns were found. The Romans, in 200 A. D. about, built a rest site along the street as "locus Matreium" as mentioned in the Tabula Peutingeriana. In 995 the village used the name "Matereia" and in 1251 was elevated to "Commune Market". The Diocese of Brixen in 1497, instituted the Court of Market that remained active until 1810 when it was transferred to the District Court of Steinach am Brenner.

The architectural structure of the "Market" consisted of a whole of inns and workshops along the main road. In 1447 Hans Gunther and his wife set a civil hospital with the aim of curing the sick passenger in transit. During the War of Fifth Coalition (1809) many local people took part, including Josepf Rapp who was then adviser of Andreas Hofer and Joseph Eisenstecken commander of the Schützen.

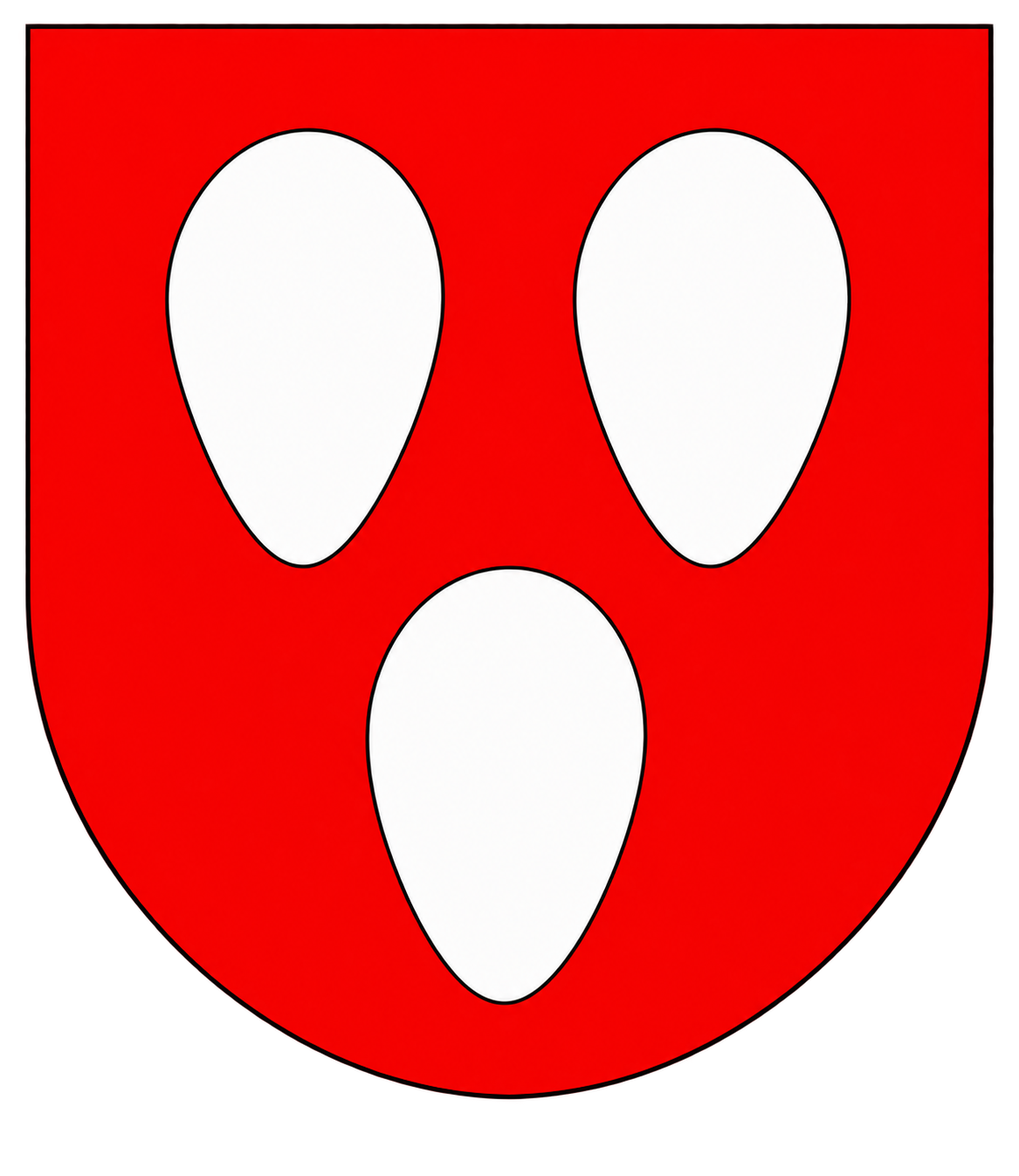
Coat of Arms of Matrei am Brenner by heraldic artist Dario Scaricamazza

Matrei, with the opening of the Brenner Railway, lost importance as more traffic was not passing through the village, but went further. A fire in 1914 destroyed most of the houses and during the Second World War, because of the strategic railway line running through it, Matrei was one of the places in Tyrol, which suffered heavy bombardment, that of March 22, 1945 caused 48 victims. After the war Matrei was rebuilt in the same way and using the old techniques of construction of the site.

== Population ==
Historical population
Year	Pop.	±%
1869	523	—
1880	539	+3.1%
1890	499	−7.4%
1900	576	+15.4%
1910	718	+24.7%
1923	589	−18.0%
1934	758	+28.7%
1939	744	−1.8%
1951	813	+9.3%
1961	954	+17.3%
1971	1,107	+16.0%
1981	1,017	−8.1%
1991	999	−1.8%
2001	998	−0.1%
2011	902	−9.6%

== Sights ==
=== Pfarrkirche Maria Himmelfahrt ===
Is the Parish church dedicated to "Our Lady". It was built in 1311 in Romanesque style, transformed into a Baroque in 1754 with frescos by Joseph Adam Mölk. Inside is preserved a miraculous image of “Our Lord in pain”. The parish church, restored in 1995, is home of the deanery and is located, passed the Sill river, in the municipality of Pfons.

=== Church of the Holy Spirit ===
The Church of the Holy Spirit, also called "Spitalskirche" (Hospital Church) is located in the southern part of Matrei, along the main street; was built in 1646 and rebuilt several times, most recently in 2000.

=== Johanneskirche - Taufkirche ===
The church is the Baptistery of the Parish and has been mentioned in documents in 1284, later became a gem of late Gothic through the work of Niklas Thuring in 1509.

=== Shrine Maria Waldrast ===
"Maria Waldrast" is a Sanctuary located in a side valley, at an altitude of 1638 meters under the Waldraster Jöchl. On April 19, 1409 the Prince Bishop of Brixen Ulrich II (Ulrich from Vienna) gave consent to the construction of the church, completed in 1429 and consecrated in 1465, the Sanctuary is part of the Servants of Mary Monastery. The origin of the shrine is described in Volume 1 (No. 349) of Deutsche Sagen by Jacob and Wilhelm Grimm: In 1392 an angel caused a wooden statue of Mary, the mother of Christ, to appear in a larch tree in Waldrast, on Serles Mountain. The statue was first noticed by a pair of shepherd boys, who called it to the attention of farmers in the valley below, and was thereafter removed from the tree and taken to the village of Matrei. A woodcutter living nearby was instructed to build a chapel in honor of Mary to shelter the statue, by a voice that came to him in his sleep. The woodcutter resisted, but after three nights the voice prevailed. The woodcutter was shown the desired location of the chapel, again while he slept, and was told to appeal to pious local residents for funding. Having explained his experience to his parish priest, the woodcutter was referred to the Bishop of Brixen. Before St. Pankratius's day in the year 1409, the Bishop granted permission for the chapel to be built.
