= Lake Moels =

Lake in Tyrol, Austria

- Mölssee (German)
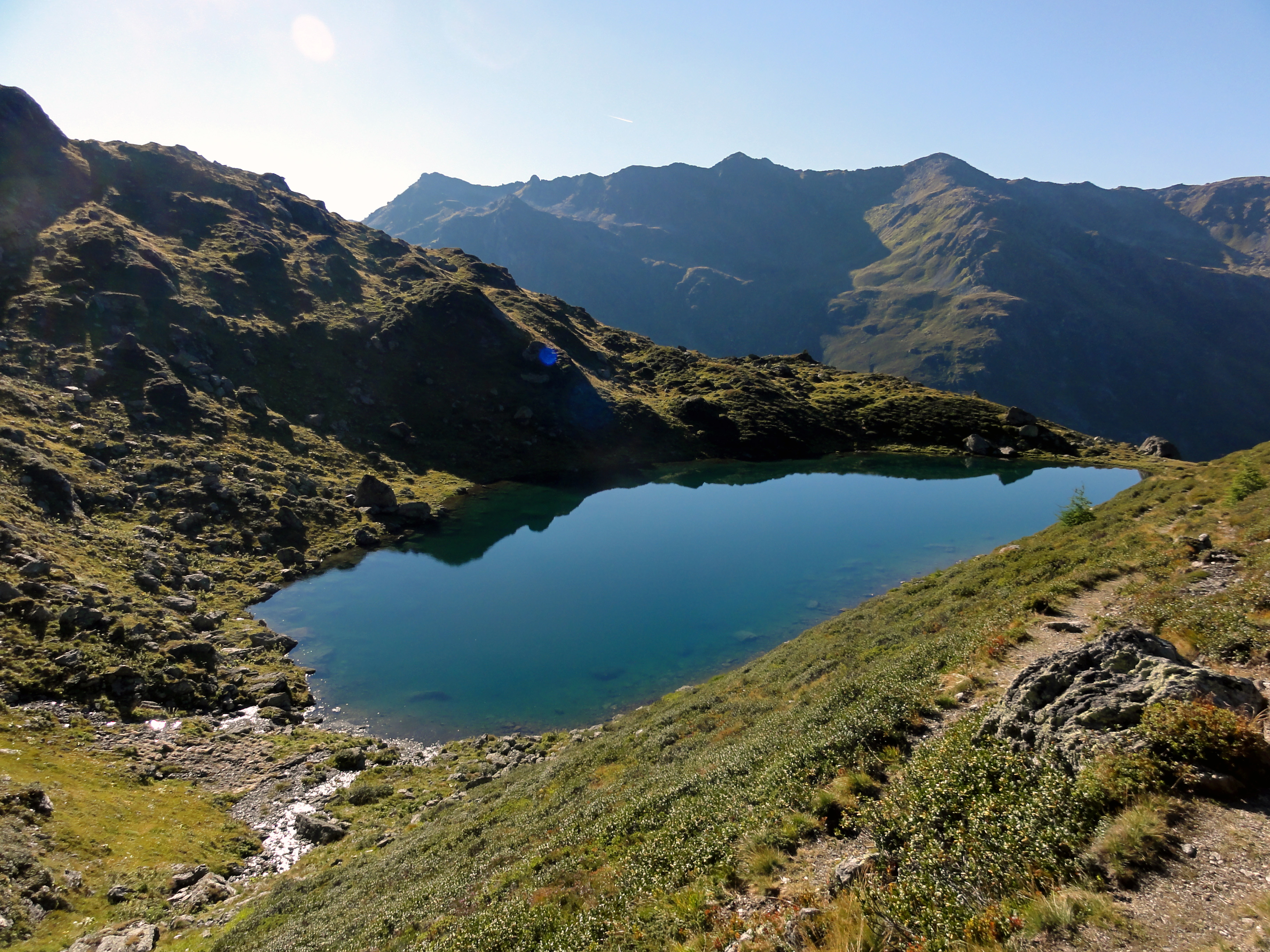

- Location within Tyrol, Austria
- Location: Tyrol, Austria
- Coordinates: 47°10′24″N 11°36′35″E
- Primary outflows: Mölsbach
- Basin countries: Austria
- Max. length: c. 200 m (660 ft)
- Max. width: c. 55 m (180 ft)
- Surface area: 3.46 ha (9 acres)
- Surface elevation: 2,240 m (7,349 ft)

Lake Moels (German: Mölssee) is a lake of Tyrol, Austria.

It can be found at the upper part of the Wattental valley at a height of 2,240 metres. With an area of 3.46 ha (8.5 acres), it is one of the larger lakes in the area. The lake can be reached by following the road Wattentalstraße beginning in Wattens. Then above the Moels Alp the lake may be gained by walking up a pretty steep trail heading for the Moels col (Mölser Scharte). The mountain lake lies within a military training area, so it can be only visited at certain particular times.

Water temperature: 11–13 °C (52–55 °F)

== Water quality ==
The crystal-clear, clean, mountain lake water has a very high drinking water quality and is a habitat for fish such as carp and trout. The lake is very cold and, even in midsummer, temperatures of 16 °C (61 °F) are rarely reached.

== Inflow and outflow ==
The Mölsbach is the natural outflow and drains the lake.
