= Navis =

- Municipality
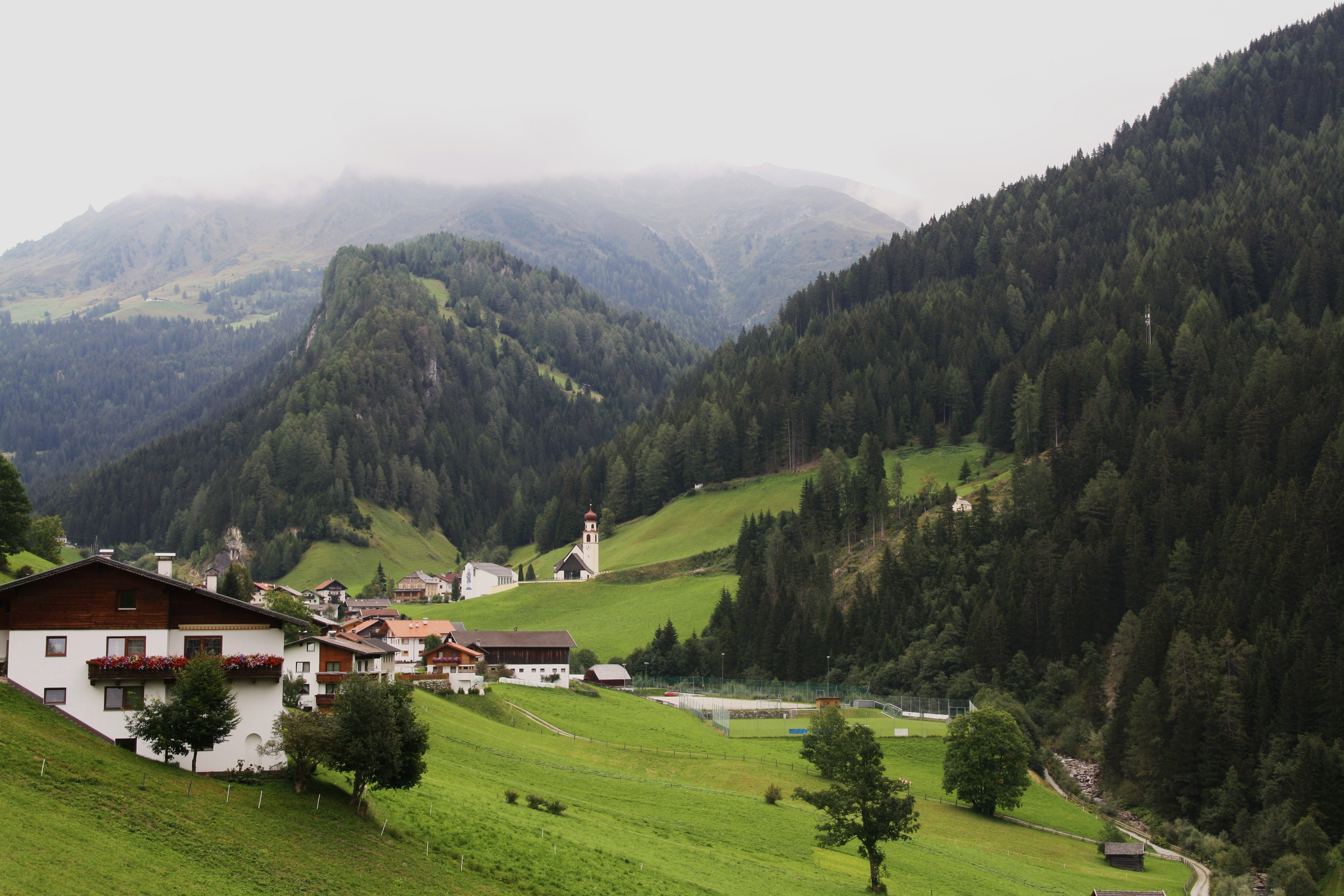

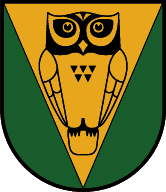
- Coat of arms

- Location within Austria
- Coordinates: 47°07′52″N 11°32′25″E
- Country: Austria
- State: Tyrol
- District: Innsbruck Land

Government
  - Mayor: Christoph Geir

Area
  - Total: 64.13 km^{2} (24.76 sq mi)
- Elevation: 1,337 m (4,386 ft)

Population (2021)
  - Total: 2,050
  - Density: 32.0/km^{2} (82.8/sq mi)
- Time zone: UTC+1 (CET)
  - Summer (DST): UTC+2 (CEST)
- Postal code: 6143
- Area code: 05278
- Vehicle registration: IL
- Website: www.navis.tirol.gv.at

Navis is a municipality in the district Innsbruck-Land in the Austrian state of Tyrol located 19 km southeast of Innsbruck in a valley with the same name which is a side valley of the Wipptal. The extensive territory of this municipality runs from the Sill up to the 2,359 m high Klammjoch saddle and the 2,886 m high Lizumer Reckner in the Tux Alps. The village is provided with fresh drinking water thanks to the clean Navisbach. The origin of the village name is unknown but settlement began at the end of the 13th century. Copper and silver were found in the 15th and 16th century.

== Population ==
Historical population
Year	Pop.	±%
1869	792	—
1880	812	+2.5%
1890	770	−5.2%
1900	830	+7.8%
1910	861	+3.7%
1923	862	+0.1%
1934	922	+7.0%
1939	908	−1.5%
1951	1,056	+16.3%
1961	1,104	+4.5%
1971	1,484	+34.4%
1981	1,651	+11.3%
1991	1,846	+11.8%
2001	1,907	+3.3%
2011	1,967	+3.1%
