= Fulpmes =

Place in Tyrol, Austria

- Municipality
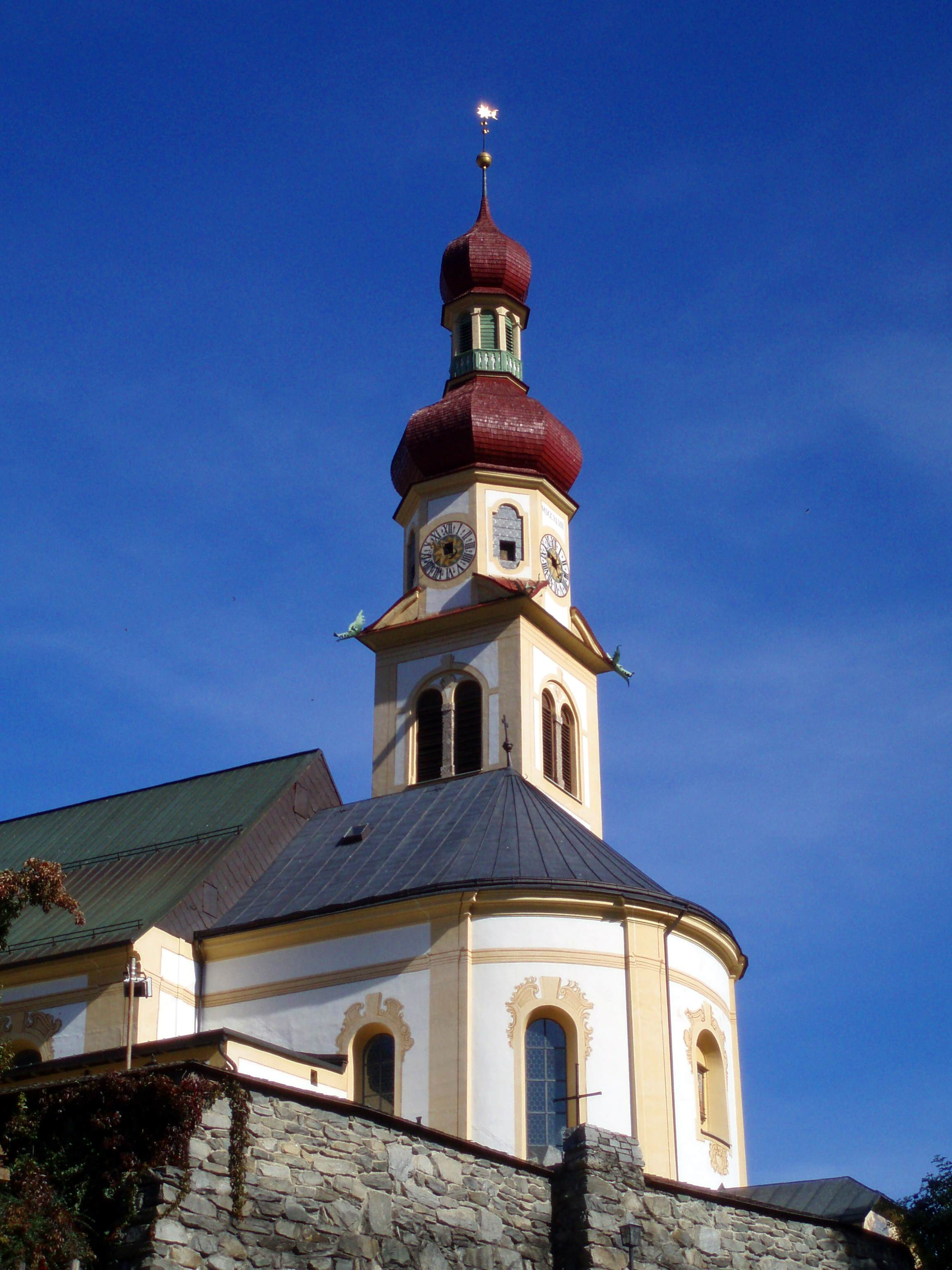

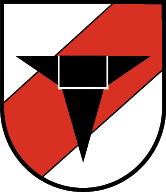
- Coat of arms

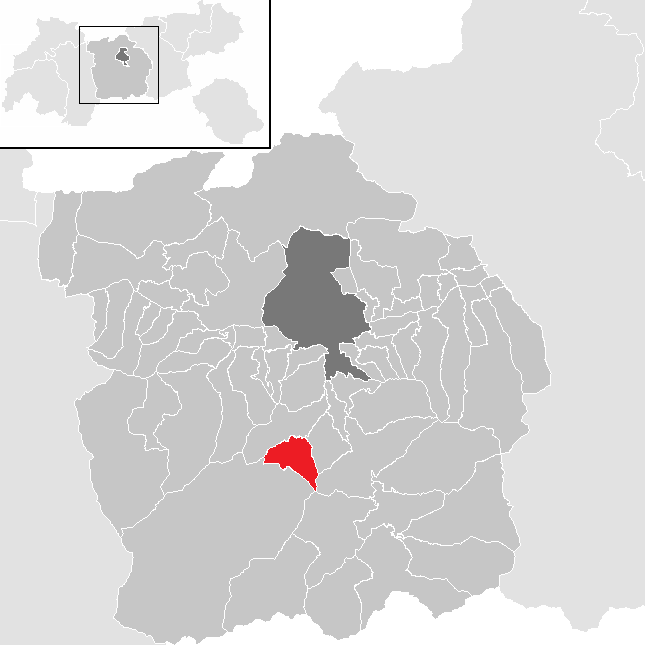
- Location in the district

- Location within Austria
- Coordinates: 47°09′12″N 11°20′57″E
- Country: Austria
- State: Tyrol
- District: Innsbruck Land

Government
  - Mayor: Robert Denifl (ÖVP)

Area
  - Total: 16.78 km^{2} (6.48 sq mi)
- Elevation: 937 m (3,074 ft)

Population (2021)
  - Total: 4,495
  - Density: 267.9/km^{2} (693.8/sq mi)
- Time zone: UTC+1 (CET)
  - Summer (DST): UTC+2 (CEST)
- Postal code: 6166
- Area code: 05225
- Vehicle registration: IL
- Website: www.fulpmes.tirol.gv.at

Fulpmes is a market town and a municipality in Stubaital, Tyrol, Austria. In 2015 it had a population of 4,250, of whom 14.5% did not have Austrian nationality. Fulpmes is the center of iron production in the area, and lies at the base of the Schlick 2000 ski area.

== Geography ==
The municipality of Fulpmes belongs to the Innsbruck Land district. It has an area of 16.77 square kilometres (6.47 sq mi), and an altitude of 936 metres (3,070 ft). The neighboring municipalities are Neustift to the west and Telfes and Mieders to the east. Fulpmes is the terminal station of the narrow-gauge railway Stubaitalbahn from Innsbruck.

== Population ==
Historical population
| Year | Pop. | ±% |
|---|---|---|
| 1869 | 1,028 | — |
| 1880 | 1,102 | +7.2% |
| 1890 | 1,079 | −2.1% |
| 1900 | 1,159 | +7.4% |
| 1910 | 1,384 | +19.4% |
| 1923 | 1,577 | +13.9% |
| 1934 | 1,624 | +3.0% |
| 1939 | 1,648 | +1.5% |
| 1951 | 2,068 | +25.5% |
| 1961 | 2,282 | +10.3% |
| 1971 | 2,582 | +13.1% |
| 1981 | 2,973 | +15.1% |
| 1991 | 3,611 | +21.5% |
| 2001 | 3,895 | +7.9% |
| 2011 | 4,169 | +7.0% |
| 2015 | 4,250 | +1.9% |

== Landmarks ==
The Stubaier Bauerntheater, founded in 1903, is one of the oldest peasant theatres in the Tyrol.

== Notable people ==
- Clemens Holzmeister, (1886–1983) architect
- Gregor Schlierenzauer, ski jumper
