= Sill (river) =

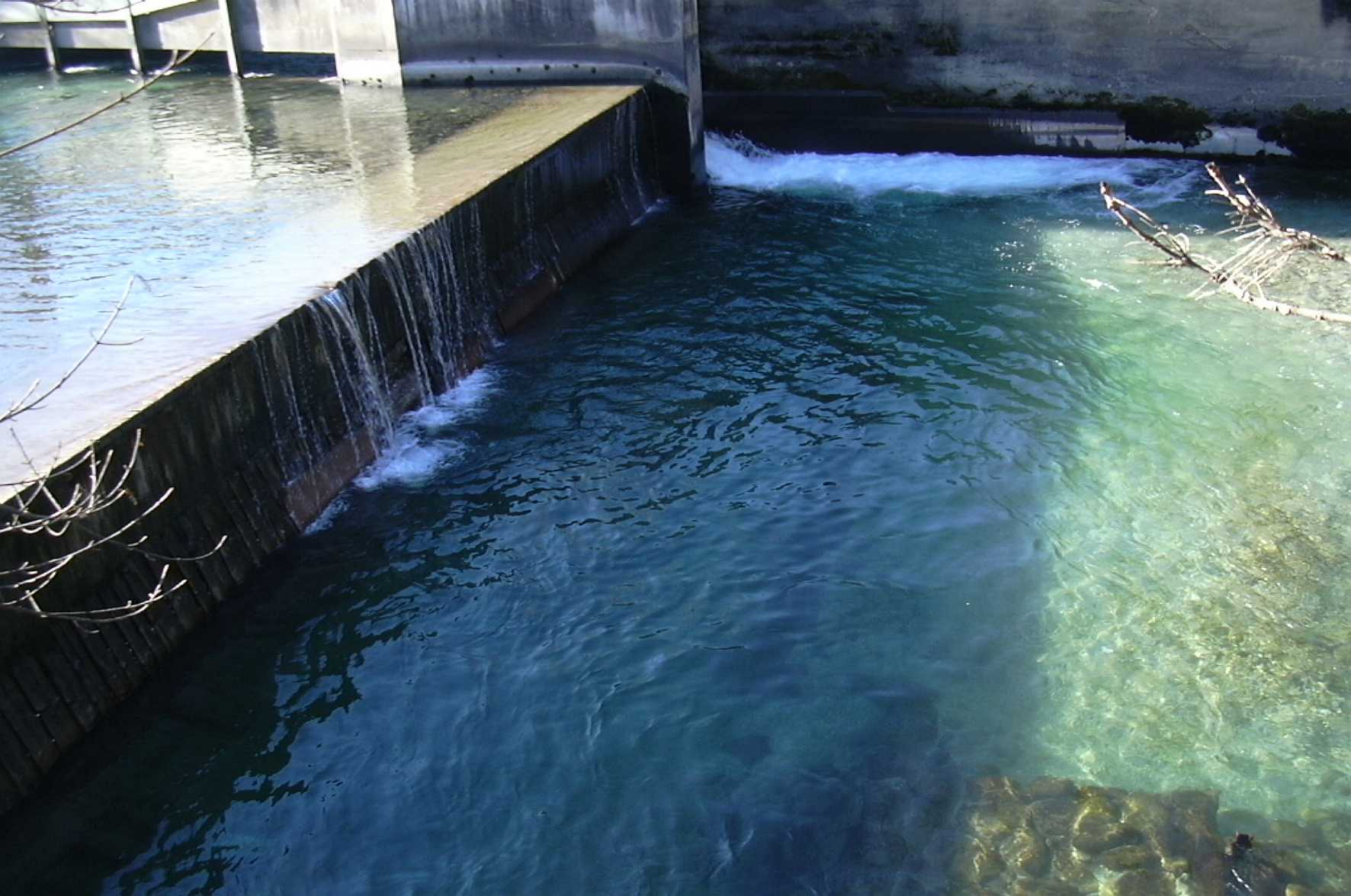
- Sill Fall

Location
- Country: Austria
- State: Tyrol

Physical characteristics
- Source
  - location: east of Brenner pass
- Mouth
  - location: Inn
  - coordinates: 47°16′39″N 11°25′08″E
- Length: 43.5 km (27.0 mi)
- Basin size: 853 km^{2} (329 sq mi)

Basin features
- Progression: Inn→ Danube→ Black Sea
- Tributaries
  - left: Gschnitzbach, Ruetz
  - right: Navisbach

The Sill is a 43-kilometre-long (27 mi) river in Tyrol, Austria. It is one of the larger tributaries of the Inn, joining it from the right bank in Tyrol. It flows north through the Wipptal to Innsbruck. Its source lies east of the Brenner Pass. At the Sillzwickel - the name of the point where it meets the Inn at Innsbruck - there is a recreation area with cycling trails.

The Viggarbach merges with it in Schönberg im Stubaital.

The natural river basin is 853 km^{2} (329 sq mi); 31.6 km^{2} (12.2 sq mi) are covered by glacier ice.

The water power generated by the river flow is used for three power plants.

Waterfalls on the river include the Sill Fall, which has a height of about 4 metres (13 ft), and from where water is taken out for urban use. In the fall basin, fishes such as trouts can be found. The Bretterkeller waterfall is located at the bottom of the Paschberg in Innsbruck.

The Sill features prominently in the stories Amras and Der Wetterfleck by the Austrian writer Thomas Bernhard.
