= Schönberg im Stubaital =

- Municipality
- Coat of arms

- Location within Austria
- Coordinates: 47°11′11″N 11°24′22″E
- Country: Austria
- State: Tyrol
- District: Innsbruck Land

Government
  - Mayor: Hermann Steixner

Area
  - Total: 7.48 km^{2} (2.89 sq mi)
- Elevation: 1,013 m (3,323 ft)

Population (2020)
  - Total: 1,109
  - Density: 148/km^{2} (384/sq mi)
- Time zone: UTC+1 (CET)
  - Summer (DST): UTC+2 (CEST)
- Postal code: 6141
- Area code: 05225
- Vehicle registration: IL
- Website: www.schoenberg.tirol.gv.at

Schönberg im Stubaital (German pronunciation: [ˈʃøːnˌbɛʁk ʔɪm ˈʃtuːbaɪˌtaːl], lit. 'Schönberg in the Stubai Valley') is a municipality in the district of Innsbruck-Land, Tyrol, Austria. It is 9 km (5.6 mi) south of Innsbruck at the entrance of the Stubaital. The village was mentioned as “Schönenberge” for the first time in 1180.

== Population ==
Historical population
Year	Pop.	±%
1869	273	—
1880	264	−3.3%
1890	247	−6.4%
1900	273	+10.5%
1910	454	+66.3%
1923	492	+8.4%
1934	430	−12.6%
1939	406	−5.6%
1951	556	+36.9%
1961	590	+6.1%
1971	668	+13.2%
1981	782	+17.1%
1991	916	+17.1%
2001	1,000	+9.2%
2011	995	−0.5%

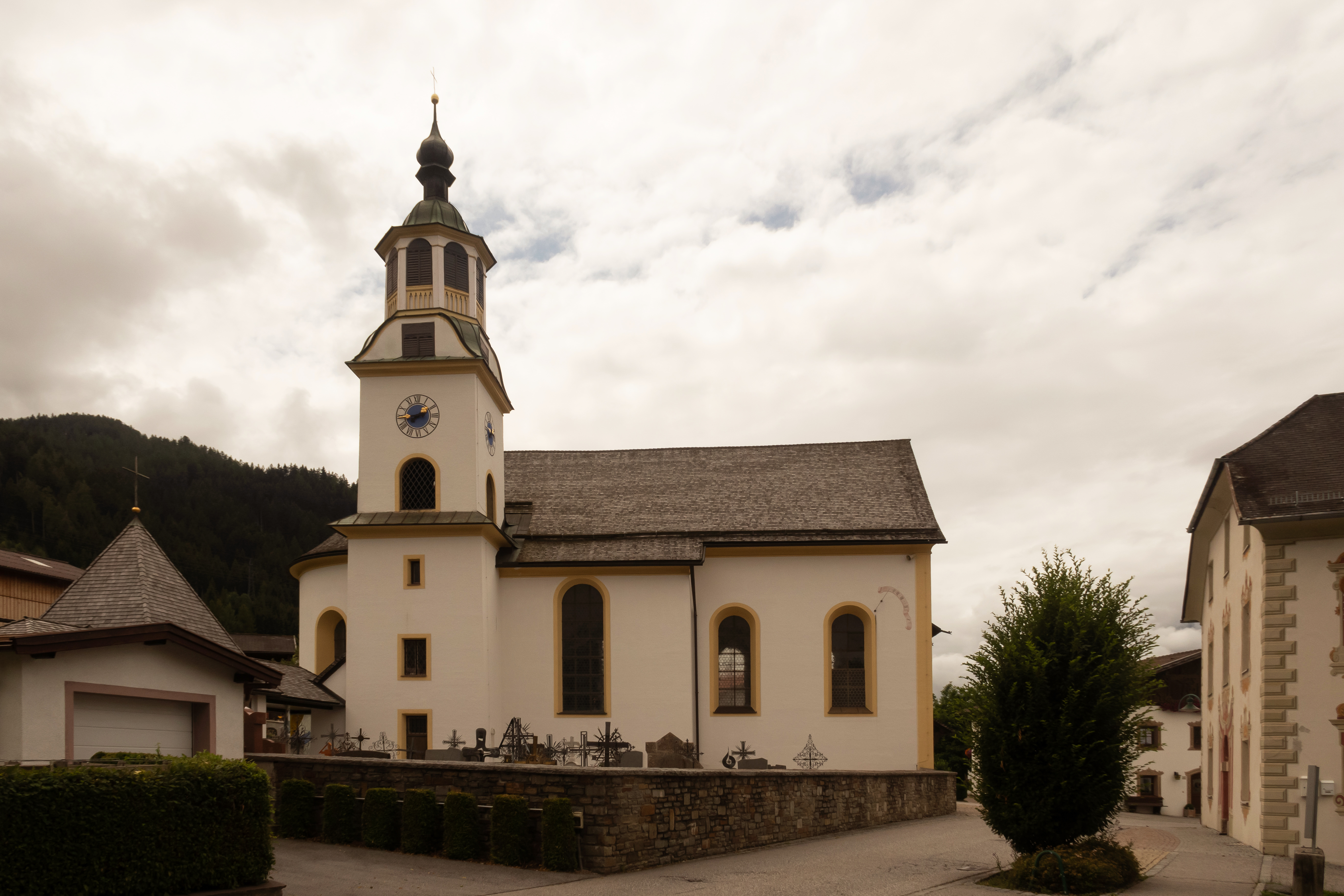
Church in Schönberg im Stubaital
