= List of dams and reservoirs in Austria =

This is a list of dams and reservoirs in Austria.

Name	Bundesland	Volume [million m³]	Area [km²]	Altitude [m]	River	Max. depth [m]	Finished	Type
Kölnbrein Dam	Kärnten	205.0	3.50	1902	Lieser, Malta	205.0	1977	Arch dam
Gepatschspeicher	Tirol	140.0	2.60	1772	Faggenbach, Pitzbach, Radurschlbach	110.0	1964	Embankment dam
Schlegeis-Speicher	Tirol	126.5	2.20	1782	Zemmbach	110.0	1971	Arch dam
Stauraum Aschach	Oberösterreich	114.0	–	280	Donau	15.0	1964	Barrage
Stauraum Altenwörth	Niederösterreich	93.0	11.00	194	Donau	15.0	1976	Barrage
Stauraum Greifenstein	Niederösterreich	87.0	–	177	Donau	12.6	1984	Barrage
Zillergründl Dam	Tirol	86.7	1.40	1850	Ziller, Inn	186.0	1986	Arch dam
Mooserboden Dam	Salzburg	84.9	1.60	2036	Kapruner Ache, Salzach	112.0	1955	Arch dam/Gravity dam
Völkermarkter Dam	Kärnten	83.0	–	391	Drau	21.2	?	Barrage
Wasserfallboden Dam	Salzburg	81.2	1.40	1672	Kapruner Ache	90.0	1951	Arch dam
Lünersee	Vorarlberg	78.3	1.65	1970	Ill	73.0	1958	Gravity dam
Stauraum Ybbs-Persenbeug	NÖ and OÖ	77.0	–	226	Donau	11.2	1959	Barrage
Ottenstein Dam	Niederösterreich	73.0	4.30	495	Kamp	69.0	1956	Arch dam
Achensee	Tirol	66.0	6.80	929	Achen Bach, Ache	113.0	?	?
Speicher Finstertal	Tirol	60.0	1.00	2400	Finstertalbach	150.0	1980	Embankment dam
Tauernmoossee	Salzburg	57.0	1.89	2023	Stubache	53.0	1973	Gravity dam
Stauraum Freudenau	Wien und NÖ	55.0	–	161	Donau	8.6	1997	Barrage
Stauraum Wallsee-Mitterkirchen	Oberösterreich	52.5	7.80	240	Donau	10.5	1968	Barrage
Speicher Durlaßboden	Salzburg/Tirol	50.7	1.80	1405	Gerlosbach	83.0	1966	Earth dam
Stauraum Abwinden-Asten	Oberösterreich	48.0	9.50	251	Donau	9.3	1979	Barrage
Melk Dam	Niederösterreich	45.0	10.00	214	Donau	8.4	1982	Barrage
Kops Dam	Vorarlberg	42.9	1.00	1809	Valluelabach, Ill	81.0	1965	Arch dam/Gravity dam
Silvretta-Dam	Vorarlberg	38.6	1.31	2030	Ill	80.0	1948	Gravity dam
Stauraum Ottensheim-Wilhering	Oberösterreich	34.0	–	264	Donau	10.5	1973	Barrage
Oscheniksee	Kärnten	30.0	0.43	2394	Fragant	146.0	1979	Embankment dam
Spullersee	Vorarlberg	16.9	0.57	1827	Spullerbach	30.0	1965	Gravity dam
Soboth Dam	Kärnten	16.2	0.87	1080	Feistritzbach	–	1990	Embankment dam
Rotgüldensee	Salzburg	15.6	0.43	1733	Rotgüldenbach	63.0	1956/1991	Embankment dam
Bockhartsee	Salzburg	14.9	0.42	1873	Nassfelder Ache, Salzach	69.0	1982	Embankment dam
Großsee	Kärnten	14.4	0.37	2417	Möll	85.0	1978	Embankment dam
Hochwurtenspeicher	Kärnten	13.2	0.49	2417	Fragant	52.0	1978	Earth dam
Klaus Dam	Oberösterreich	12.6	0.90	463	Steyr (river)	–	1975	Arch dam
Salza Dam	Steiermark	11.0	0.80	771	Salza	–	1949	Arch dam
Wienerwaldsee	Niederösterreich	–	0.32	289	Wienfluss, Wolfsgrabenbach	−	1897	?
Zirmsee	Kärnten	8.7	0.30	2530	Möll	51.0	1984	Embankment dam
Bolgenach Dam	Vorarlberg	8.4	0.30	744	Bolgenach, Bregenzer Ach	–	1978	Earth dam
Großer Mühldorfer See	Kärnten	7.9	0.24	2319	Möll, Drau	65.0	1957	Gravity dam
Speicher Stillup	Tirol	6.6	–	1119	?	–	?	Earth dam
Packer Dam	Steiermark	5.4	0.60	866	Teigitsch	30.0	1931	Gravity dam/Earth dam
Vermunt Dam	Vorarlberg	5.3	0.35	1743	Ill	24.0	1931	Gravity dam
Speicher Galgenbichl	Kärnten	4.4	–	?	?	–	?	Gravity dam/Embankment dam
Speicher Längental	Tirol	3.4	0.21	2000	Nederbach, Inn	45.0	1980	Earth dam
Stausee Margaritze	Kärnten	3.2	0.20	2000	Möll	39.0	1952	Gravity dam
Wurtenspeicher	Kärnten	2.8	0.22	1695	Wurtenbach	–	1971	Earth dam
Ranna Pumped Storage Power Station	Oberösterreich	2.35	0.27	493	Ranna, Höllbach	30	1954	Arched gravity dam
Speicher Großsölk	Steiermark	1.7	0.13	902	Große Sölk	39.0	1978	Arch dam
Erlauf Dam	Niederösterreich	1.7	0.2	783	Erlauf	20,0	1911	Arched gravity dam
Speicher Gmünd	Tirol	0.9	–	1191	?	20.0	1945/1993	Arch dam
Langhalsen Dam	Oberösterreich	0.736	0.18	456	Große Mühl	–	1924	Gravity dam
Klammsee	Salzburg	0.2	0.07	847	Kapruner Ache	–	1947	Gravity dam
