= List of lakes of Austria =

The ten largest lakes of Austria

The following is a list of natural lakes of Austria with a surface area of more than 0.5 square kilometres (0.19 mi^{2}) in alphabetical order.

== List ==
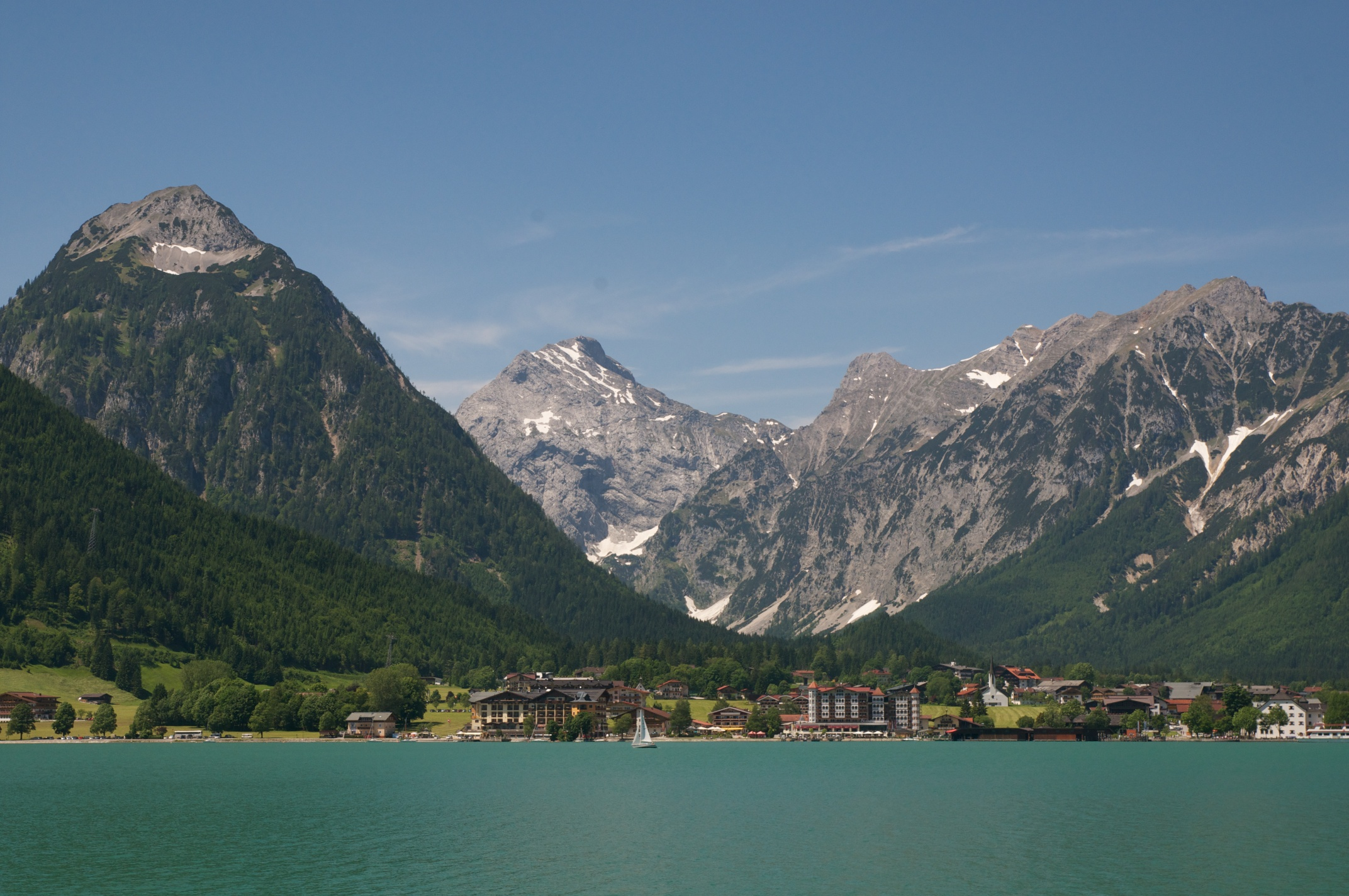
Achensee

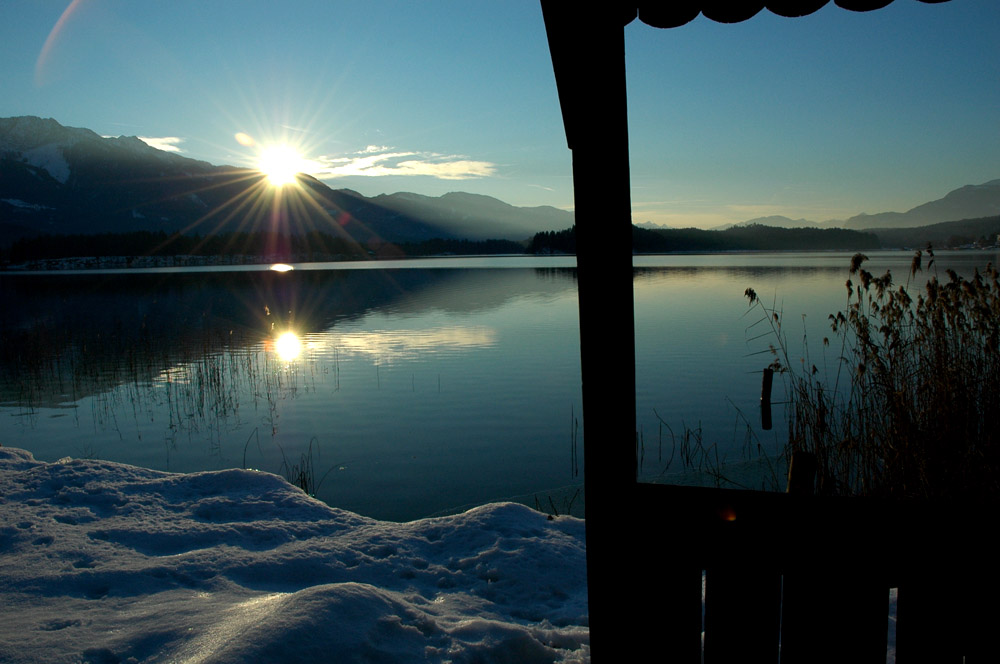
Faaker See

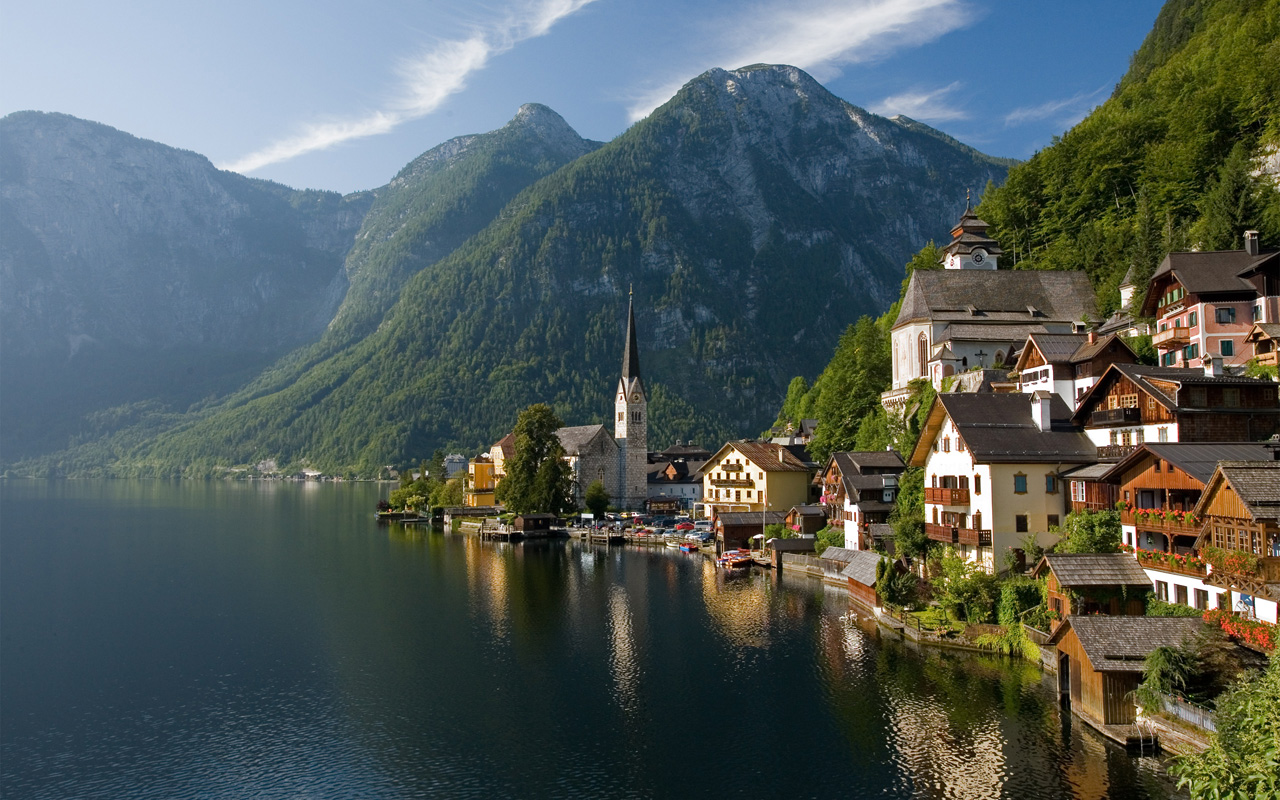
Hallstätter See

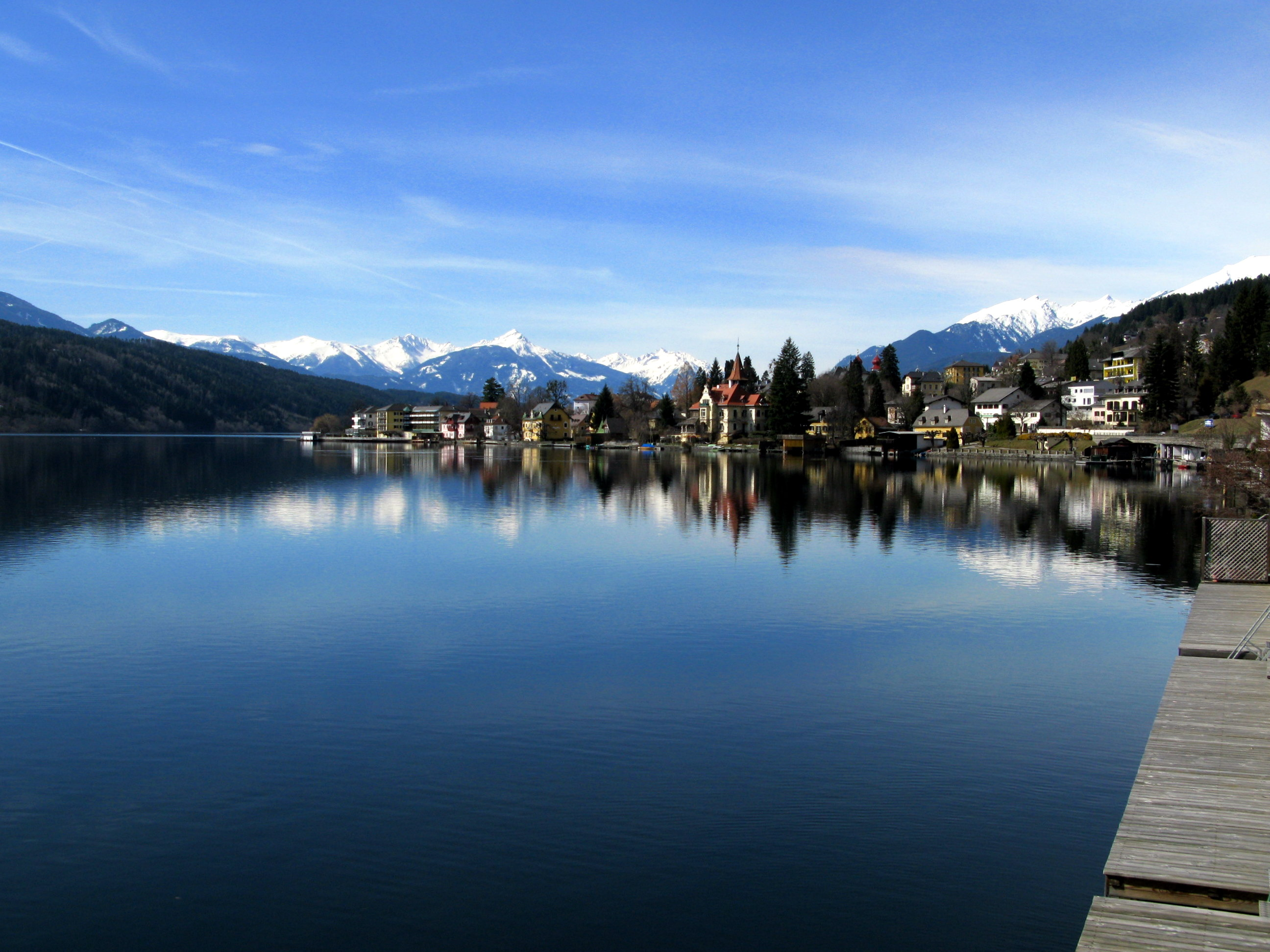
Millstätter See

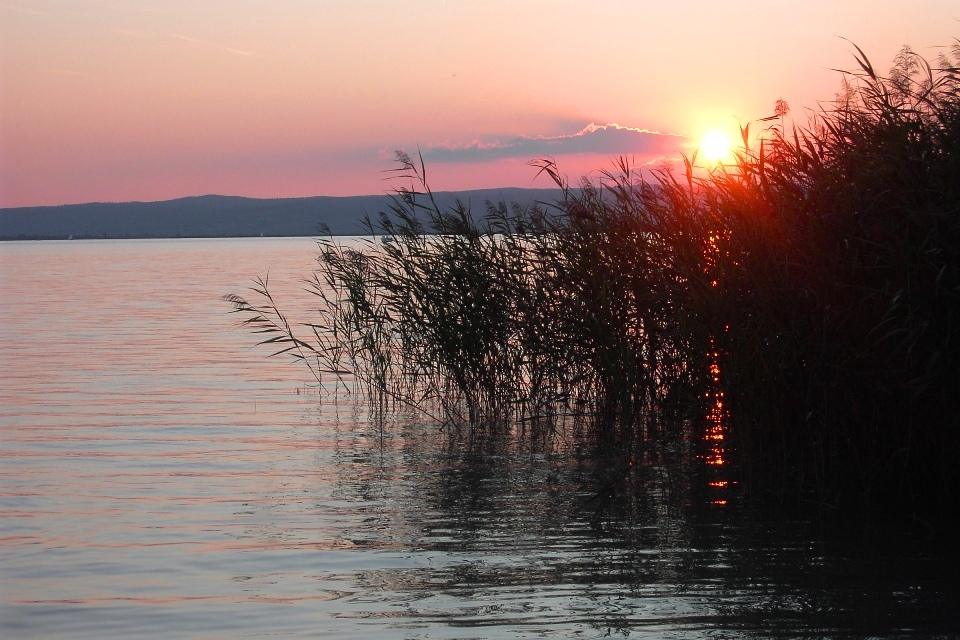
Neusiedler See

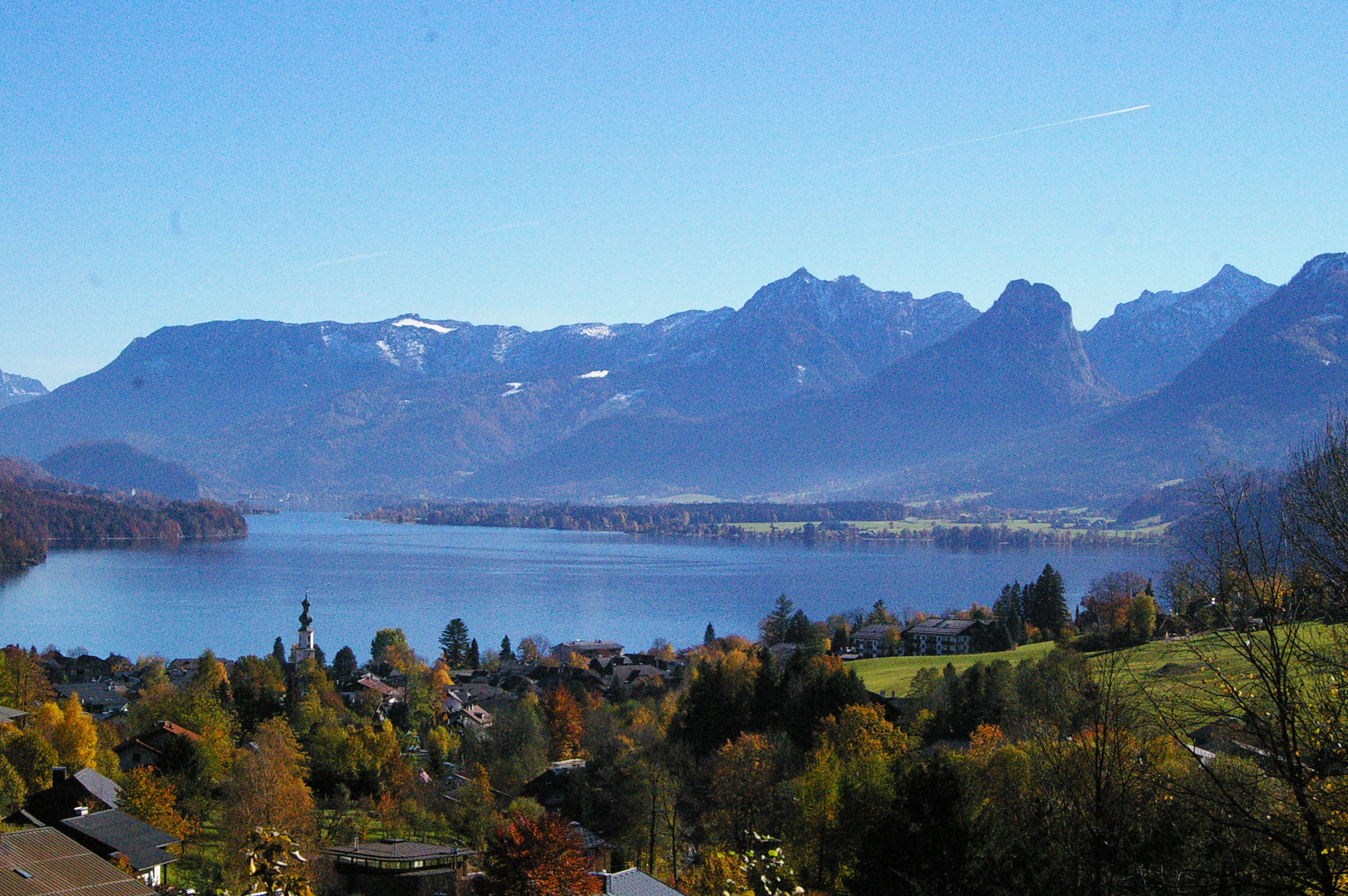
Wolfgangsee

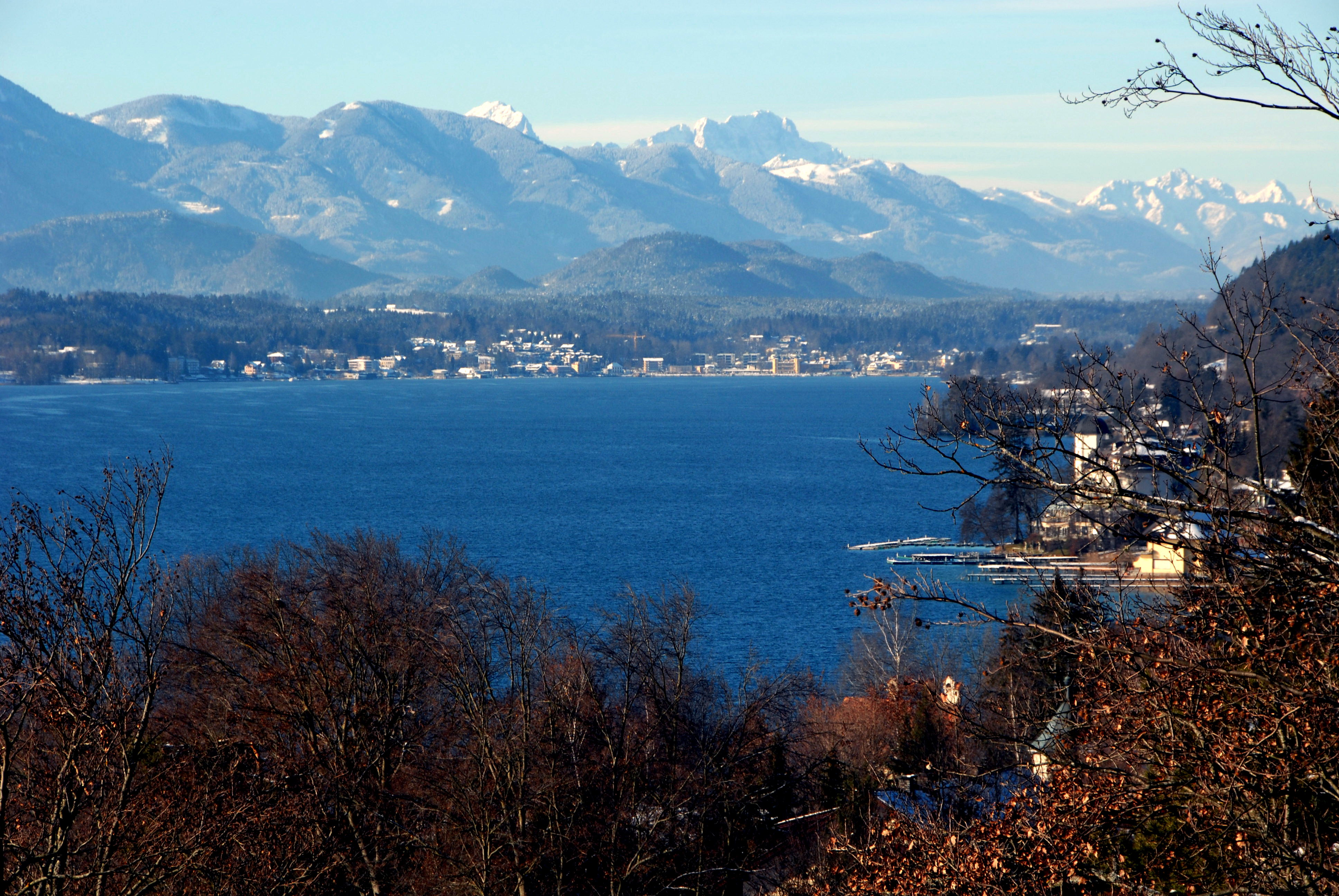
Wörthersee

Name	State	Surface elevation (m AA)	Surface area	Max. depth
Achensee	Tyrol	929 m (3,048 ft)	6.8 km^{2} (2.6 mi^{2})	133 m (436 ft)
Almsee	Upper Austria	487 m (1,598 ft)	0.85 km^{2} (0.33 mi^{2})	5 m (16 ft)
Altausseer See	Styria	712 m (2,336 ft)	2.1 km^{2} (0.81 mi^{2})	53 m (174 ft)
Old Danube	Vienna	157 m (515 ft)	1.7 km^{2} (0.66 mi^{2})	7 m (23 ft)
Attersee	Upper Austria	469 m (1,539 ft)	46.2 km^{2} (17.8 mi^{2})	171 m (561 ft)
Bodensee (Lake Constance)	Vorarlberg	396 m (1,299 ft)	539 km^{2} (208 mi^{2}) in Austria: 58.6 km^{2} (22.6 mi^{2})	254 m (833 ft)
Erlaufsee	Lower Austria, Styria	835 m (2,740 ft)	0.72 km^{2} (0.28 mi^{2})	38 m (125 ft)
Faaker See	Carinthia	555 m (1,821 ft)	2.2 km^{2} (0.85 mi^{2})	30 m (98 ft)
Fuschlsee	Salzburg	663 m (2,175 ft)	2.7 km^{2} (1.0 mi^{2})	67 m (220 ft)
Grabensee	Salzburg	503 m (1,650 ft)	1.3 km^{2} (0.50 mi^{2})	14 m (46 ft)
Grundlsee	Styria	708 m (2,323 ft)	4.1 km^{2} (1.6 mi^{2})	64 m (210 ft)
Haldensee	Tyrol	1,124 m (3,688 ft)	0.73 km^{2} (0.28 mi^{2})	22 m (72 ft)
Hallstätter See	Upper Austria	508 m (1,667 ft)	8.6 km^{2} (3.3 mi^{2})	125 m (410 ft)
Heiterwanger See	Tyrol	976 m (3,202 ft)	1.4 km^{2} (0.54 mi^{2})	60 m (200 ft)
Hintersee	Salzburg	685 m (2,247 ft)	0.82 km^{2} (0.32 mi^{2})	22 m (72 ft)
Hintersteiner See	Tyrol	882 m (2,894 ft)	0.55 km^{2} (0.21 mi^{2})	35 m (115 ft)
Illmitzer Zicksee	Burgenland	116 m (381 ft)	1.2 km^{2} (0.46 mi^{2})	1 m (3.3 ft)
Irrsee	Upper Austria	553 m (1,814 ft)	3.6 km^{2} (1.4 mi^{2})	32 m (105 ft)
Keutschacher See	Carinthia	506 m (1,660 ft)	1.3 km^{2} (0.50 mi^{2})	16 m (52 ft)
Klopeiner See	Carinthia	446 m (1,463 ft)	1.1 km^{2} (0.42 mi^{2})	48 m (157 ft)
Lange Lacke	Burgenland	116 m (381 ft)	1.5 km^{2} (0.58 mi^{2})	1 m (3.3 ft)
Längsee	Carinthia	550 m (1,800 ft)	0.75 km^{2} (0.29 mi^{2})	21 m (69 ft)
Lunzer See	Lower Austria	608 m (1,995 ft)	0.68 km^{2} (0.26 mi^{2})	34 m (112 ft)
Mattsee	Salzburg	503 m (1,650 ft)	3.6 km^{2} (1.4 mi^{2})	42 m (138 ft)
Millstätter See	Carinthia	588 m (1,929 ft)	13.3 km^{2} (5.1 mi^{2})	141 m (463 ft)
Mondsee	Upper Austria	481 m (1,578 ft)	13.8 km^{2} (5.3 mi^{2})	68 m (223 ft)
Neufelder See	Burgenland	223 m (732 ft)	1.8 km^{2} (0.69 mi^{2})	23 m (75 ft)
Neusiedler See	Burgenland	115 m (377 ft)	315 km^{2} (122 mi^{2}) in Austria: 240 km^{2} (93 mi^{2})	2 m (6.6 ft)
Obertrumer See	Salzburg	503 m (1,650 ft)	4.9 km^{2} (1.9 mi^{2})	36 m (118 ft)
Offensee	Upper Austria	649 m (2,129 ft)	0.55 km^{2} (0.21 mi^{2})	38 m (125 ft)
Ossiacher See	Carinthia	502 m (1,647 ft)	10.8 km^{2} (4.2 mi^{2})	52 m (171 ft)
Plansee	Tyrol	976 m (3,202 ft)	2.9 km^{2} (1.1 mi^{2})	77 m (253 ft)
Pressegger See	Carinthia	560 m (1,840 ft)	0.55 km^{2} (0.21 mi^{2})	14 m (46 ft)
Toplitzsee	Styria	718 m (2,356 ft)	0.54 km^{2} (0.21 mi^{2})	103 m (338 ft)
Traunsee	Upper Austria	423 m (1,388 ft)	24.4 km^{2} (9.4 mi^{2})	191 m (627 ft)
Vilsalpsee	Tyrol	1,165 m (3,822 ft)	0.51 km^{2} (0.20 mi^{2})	30 m (98 ft)
Vorderer Gosausee	Upper Austria	933 m (3,061 ft)	0.58 km^{2} (0.22 mi^{2})	69 m (226 ft)
Walchsee	Tyrol	655 m (2,149 ft)	0.95 km^{2} (0.37 mi^{2})	21 m (69 ft)
Wallersee	Salzburg	505 m (1,657 ft)	6.1 km^{2} (2.4 mi^{2})	23 m (75 ft)
Weissensee	Carinthia	929 m (3,048 ft)	6.5 km^{2} (2.5 mi^{2})	99 m (325 ft)
Wolfgangsee	Salzburg, Upper Austria	538 m (1,765 ft)	12.8 km^{2} (4.9 mi^{2})	113 m (371 ft)
Wörthersee	Carinthia	440 m (1,440 ft)	19.4 km^{2} (7.5 mi^{2})	85 m (279 ft)
Zeller See	Salzburg	750 m (2,460 ft)	4.6 km^{2} (1.8 mi^{2})	68 m (223 ft)
Zicksee	Burgenland	116 m (381 ft)	1.2 km^{2} (0.46 mi^{2})	1 m (3.3 ft)

== Other lakes ==
- Hirzkar Lake, a group of small lakes in Upper Austria.

== See also ==
- List of dams and reservoirs in Austria
- Geography of Austria
