= Soboth =

- Former municipality
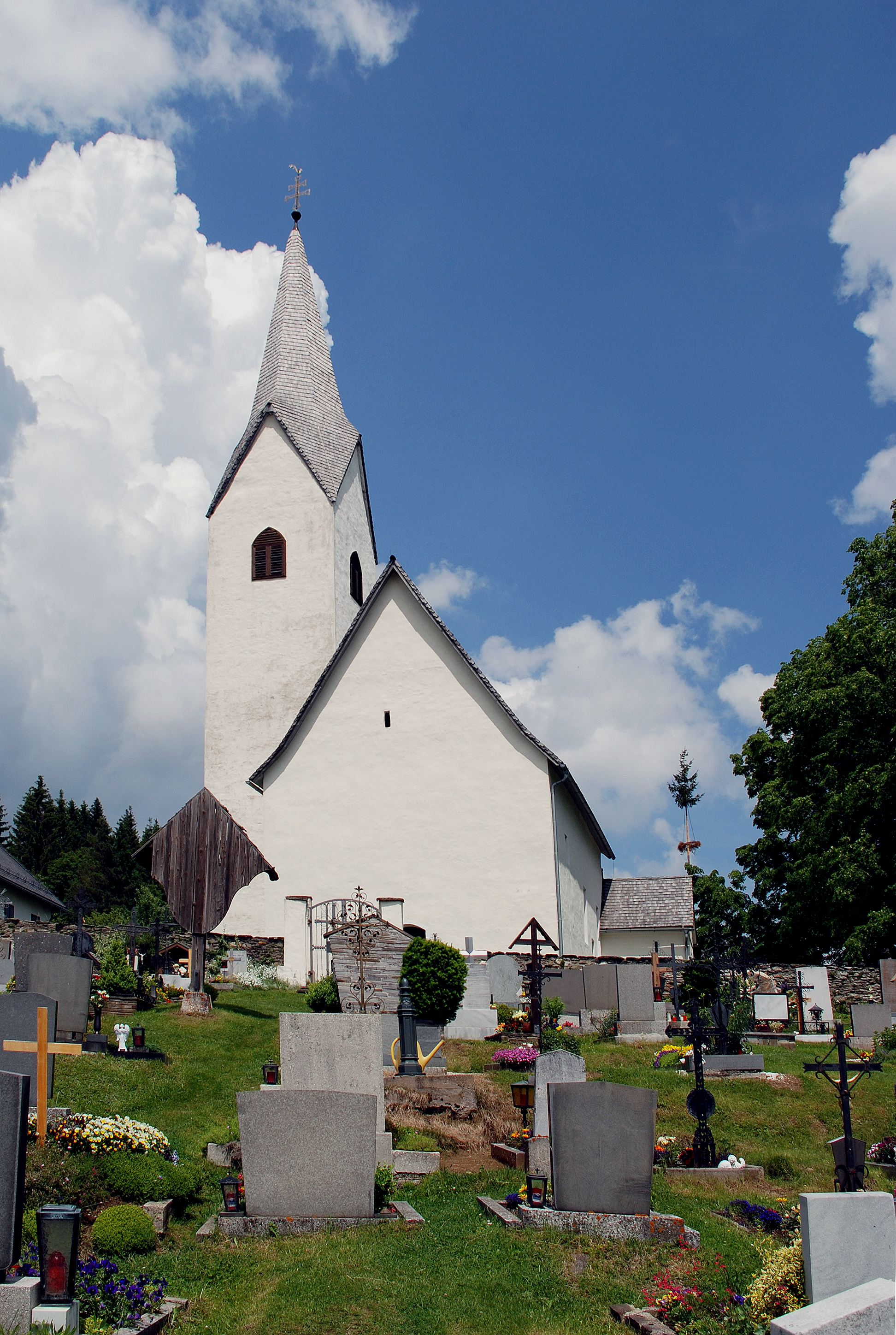
- Soboth parish church

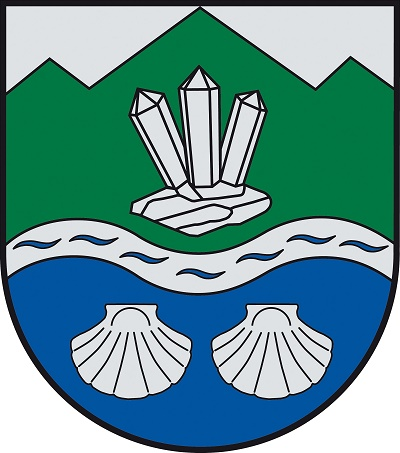
- Coat of arms

- Location within Austria
- Coordinates: 46°40′54″N 15°04′28″E
- Country: Austria
- State: Styria
- District: Deutschlandsberg

Area
  - Total: 42.38 km^{2} (16.36 sq mi)
- Elevation: 1,070 m (3,510 ft)

Population (2014-01-01)
  - Total: 319
  - Density: 7.53/km^{2} (19.5/sq mi)
- Time zone: UTC+1 (CET)
  - Summer (DST): UTC+2 (CEST)
- Postal code: 8554
- Area code: 03460
- Vehicle registration: DL
- Website: www.soboth.com

Soboth (Slovene: Sobota) was a municipality in Austria which merged in January 2015 into Eibiswald in the Deutschlandsberg District in the Austrian state of Styria.

The Soboth Pass and Soboth reservoir are located near Soboth.

== Population ==
Historical population
Year	Pop.	±%
1869	1,111	—
1880	1,017	−8.5%
1890	920	−9.5%
1900	919	−0.1%
1910	810	−11.9%
1923	811	+0.1%
1934	839	+3.5%
1939	929	+10.7%
1951	932	+0.3%
1961	839	−10.0%
1971	600	−28.5%
1981	518	−13.7%
1991	492	−5.0%
2001	421	−14.4%
2011	341	−19.0%
2014	319	−6.5%
