= Hart, Austria =

Hart
- Municipality
- Location within Austria Hart (Austria)
- Country: Austria
- State: Carinthia
- District: Wolfsberg
- Elevation: 630 m (2,070 ft)
- Time zone: UTC+1 (CET)
  - Summer (DST): UTC+2 (CEST)

Hart (Slovene: Dobrova) is the name of a village in Austria. It is part of the Gemeinde Lavamünd, in the district of Wolfsberg in the Austrian state of Carinthia.

Hart lies in the southeast of Carinthia, close to the border with Slovenia (Slovene Carinthia). It has an average altitude of 630 metres (2083 ft).

In the 2020s, the village was involved in a controversy over a proposed soil-excavation landfill, for which construction company Porr sought a permit. In May 2023, a citizen initiative successfully persuaded the government of the state of Carinthia to deny the permit, and in February 2025, a state administrative court upheld the rejection of the permit.
