= Lavamünd =

- Municipality
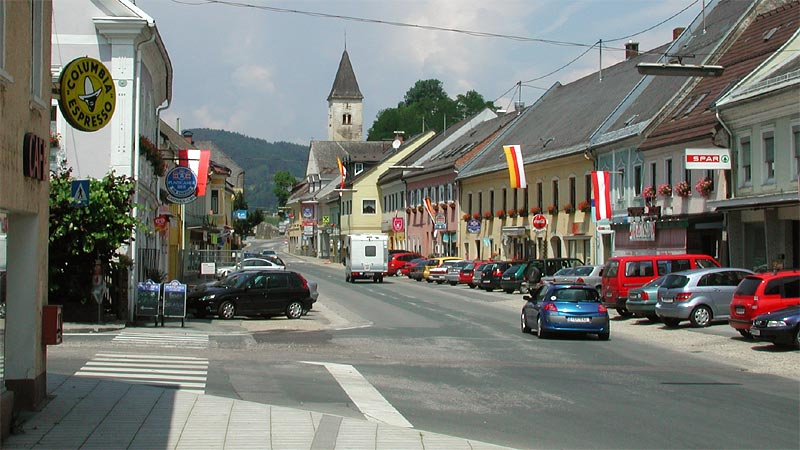
- Main square

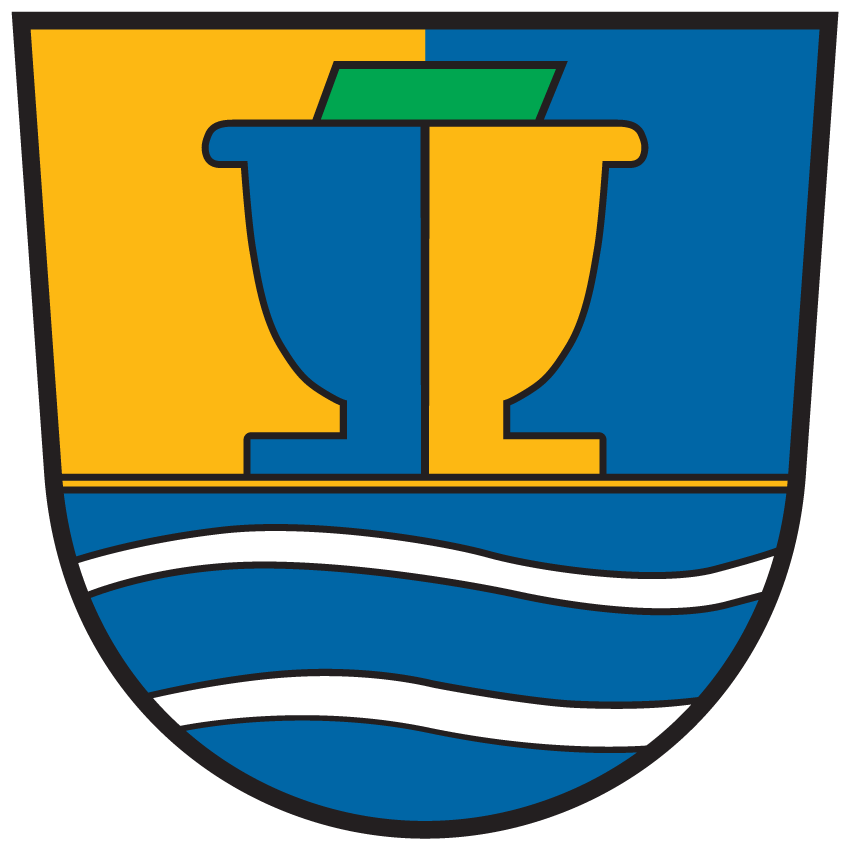
- Coat of arms

- Location within Austria Lavamünd (Austria)
- Coordinates: 46°36′N 14°56′E
- Country: Austria
- State: Carinthia
- District: Wolfsberg

Government
  - Mayor: Josef Ruthardt (SPÖ)

Area
  - Total: 93.8 km^{2} (36.2 sq mi)
- Elevation: 348 m (1,142 ft)

Population (2018-01-01)
  - Total: 2,941
  - Density: 31.4/km^{2} (81.2/sq mi)
- Time zone: UTC+1 (CET)
  - Summer (DST): UTC+2 (CEST)
- Postal code: 9473
- Area code: 04356
- Website: www.lavamuend.at

Lavamünd (Slovene: Labot) is a market town in the district of Wolfsberg in the Austrian state of Carinthia.

The Lavamünd hydroelectric power plant on the Drava River and the Koralpe power plant are located in or near Lavamünd.

== Geography ==
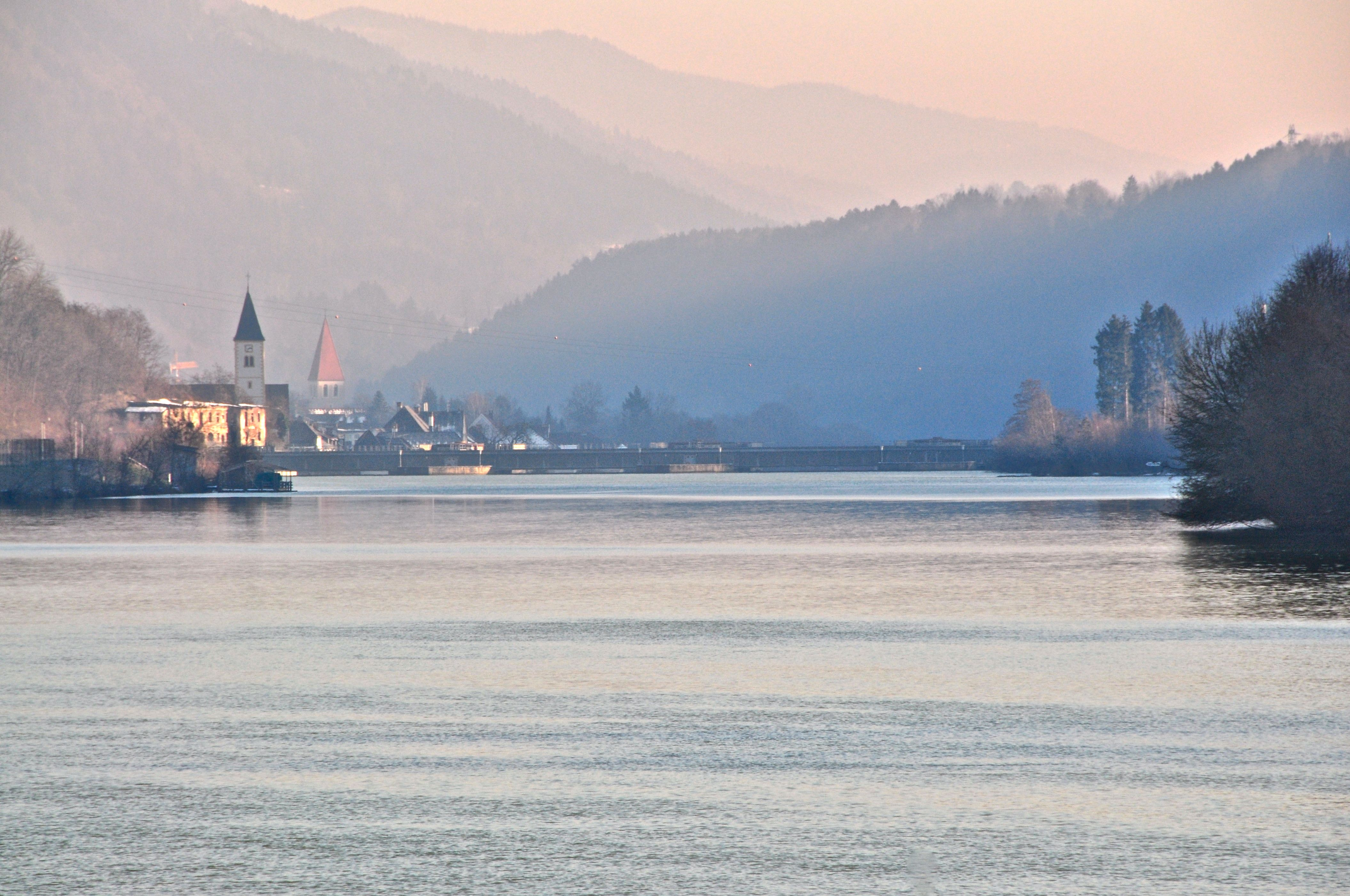
View across the Drava

Lavamünd lies in the southeast of Carinthia, close to the border with Slovenia (Slovene Carinthia). It is situated at the confluence of the Lavant and Drava rivers. In the northeast, the Soboth Pass leads across the Koralpe range to Eibiswald in Styria. At an elevation of 348 m (1,142 ft) AA, the area is the lowest part of Carinthia.

The municipal area consists of the cadastral communities of Ettendorf, Großlamprechtsberg, Hart (Dobrova), Lamprechtsberg-Hartneidstein, Lavamünd proper, Lorenzenberg (Šentlovrenc), Magdalensberg, Rabenstein (Rabštajn pri Labotu), Weißenberg, and Wunderstätten (Drumlje pri Labotu).

== History ==
The region in the Drava valley was already settled in Roman times. The estates at the confluence with the Lavant River were mentioned in a 1091 deed of donation, issued by the local Sponheim count Engelbert I in favour of newly established Saint Paul's Abbey. The market town itself arose in the 13th century; it was first documented in 1334. Habsburg Emperor Frederick III vested the citizens with high justice rights (Blutgerichtsbarkeit) in 1461.

The present-day municipality was established in 1850. Upon the 1920 Carinthian plebiscite, the neighbouring area of Dravograd (Unterdrauburg) fell to the Kingdom of Yugoslavia. 96.9% of the Lavamünd citizens voted to remain with the Austrian Republic.

== Politics ==
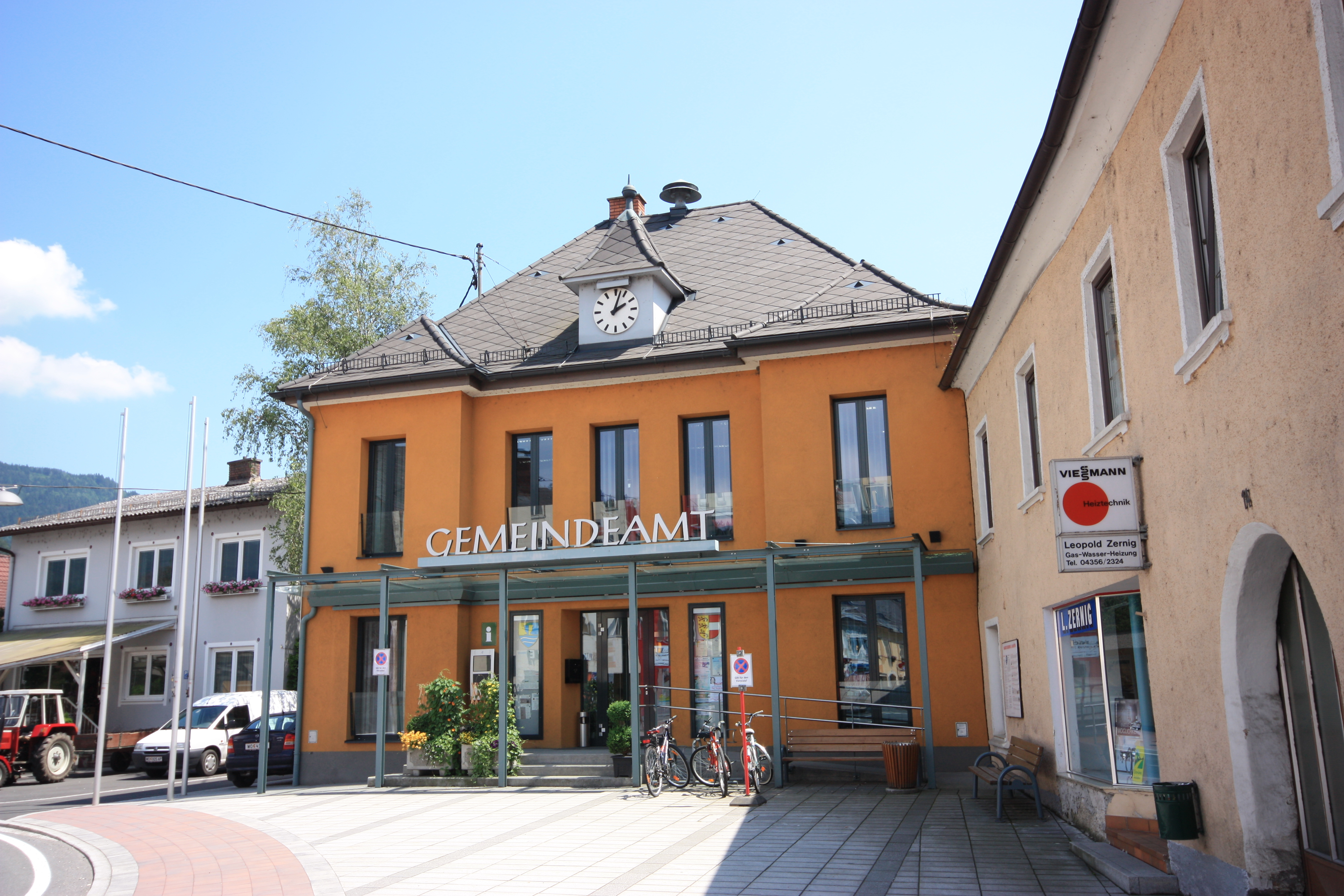
Town hall

Seats in the municipal assembly (Gemeinderat) as of 2015 local elections:

- Social Democratic Party of Austria (SPÖ): 12
- Austrian People's Party (ÖVP): 8
- Freedom Party of Austria (FPÖ): 3
