= Soboth Reservoir =

Reservoir in Austria

Coordinates: 46.6850045°N 15.0292341°E

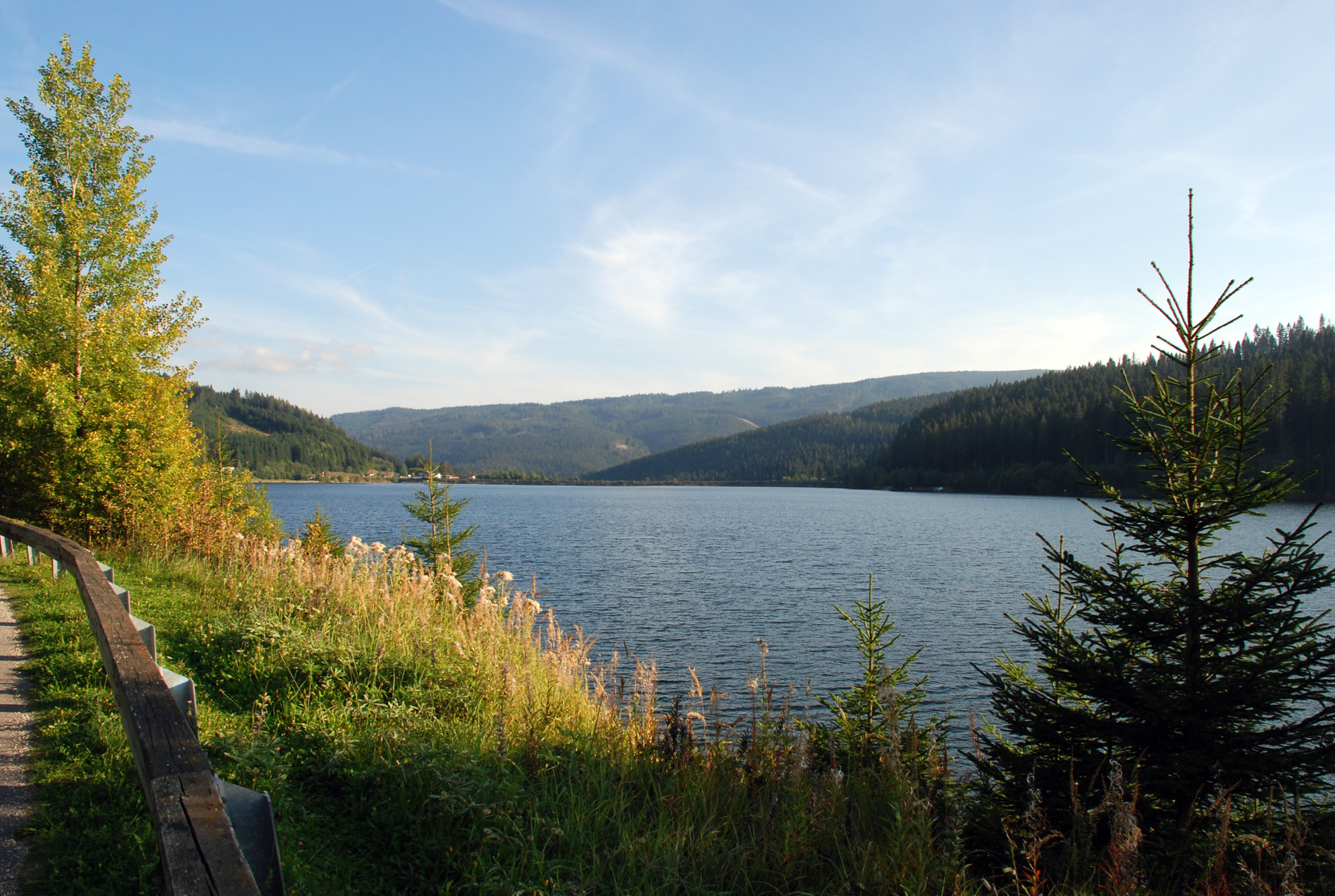
Soboth reservoir

Soboth reservoir (German: Stausee Soboth or Soboth See, Slovene: Jezero Sobote) is an artificial reservoir in Austria created in 1990 when an embankment dam on the Feistritz stream was created to power the Koralpe hydroelectric power plant. The artificial lake is located in the Koralpe mountain range, near the Soboth village, beside the road connecting Lavamünd and Graz, close to the Soboth Pass near the Slovenian-Austrian border. Its elevation is about 1080 m above sea level. Its natural drainage basin has an area of 29.7 km². The reservoir is around 2 km long and up to 500 m wide, has a surface area of 0.8 km^{2} and is up to 80 m deep. In summer, the lake is a popular place for swimming due to its clean water, cooler climate due to its high elevation, and natural surroundings consisting of spruce-covered hills.

== Koralpe power plant ==
The Koralpe power plant was constructed between 1987 and 1991 as a passive storage power station. Between 2009 and 2011, the power plant was expanded into a pumped-storage power station. The 50 MW station is located on the banks of the Drava River close to Lavamünd, at an elevation of 339 m above sea level. Water is routed from the reservoir to the power plant via a five-kilometer-long pressure tunnel and a three-kilometer-long pressure line. The maximal height difference of the pipeline is 735.5 m.

== See also ==
- List of dams and reservoirs in Austria
