= St. Georgen im Lavanttal =

- Municipality
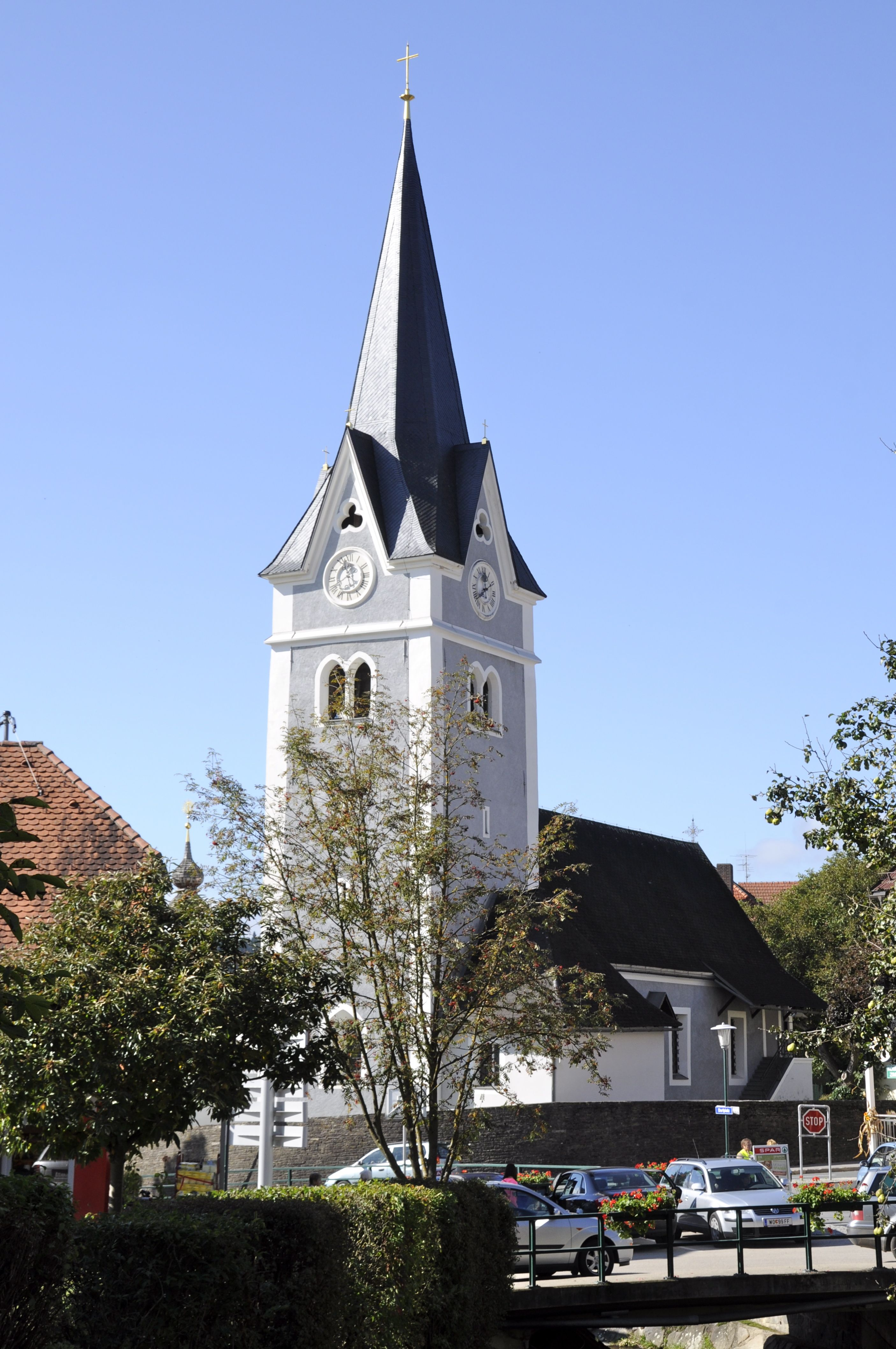
- Sankt Georgen parish church

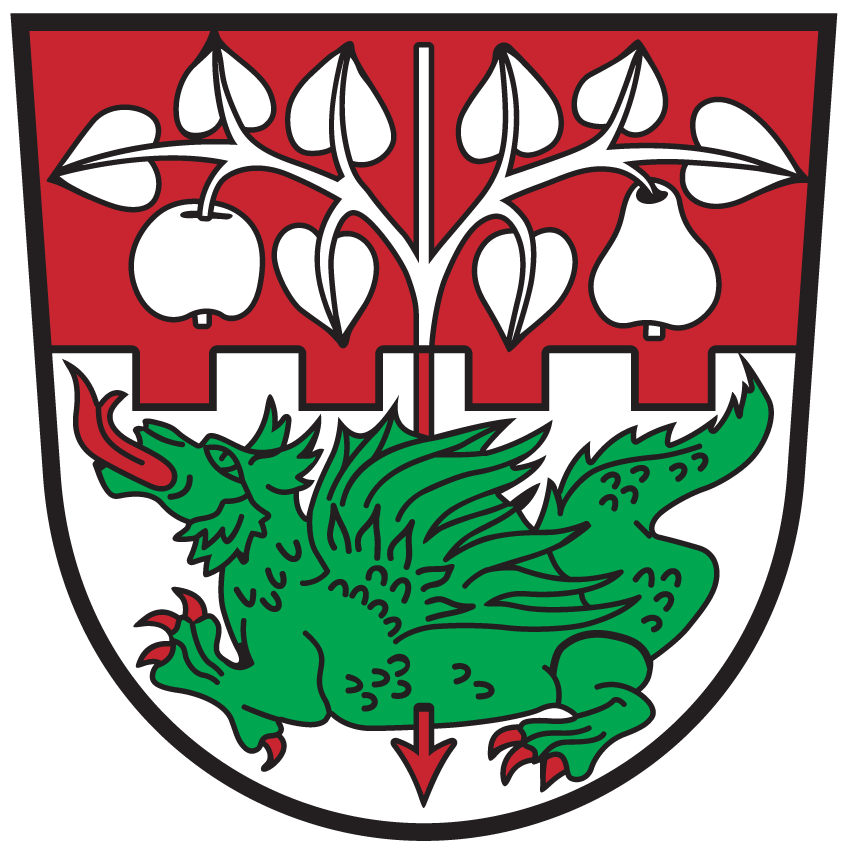
- Coat of arms

- Location within Austria
- Coordinates: 46°43′N 14°55′E
- Country: Austria
- State: Carinthia
- District: Wolfsberg

Government
  - Mayor: Karl Markut

Area
  - Total: 72.39 km^{2} (27.95 sq mi)
- Elevation: 453 m (1,486 ft)

Population (2018-01-01)
  - Total: 1,981
  - Density: 27.37/km^{2} (70.88/sq mi)
- Time zone: UTC+1 (CET)
  - Summer (DST): UTC+2 (CEST)
- Postal code: 9423
- Area code: 04357
- Website: www.st-georgen-lav.at

St. Georgen im Lavanttal (Slovene: Šent Jurij v Labotu) is a town in the district of Wolfsberg in the Austrian state of Carinthia.

== Geography ==
The municipality lies in the lower Lavant River valley 17 km south of Wolfsberg.
