= Vallülasee =

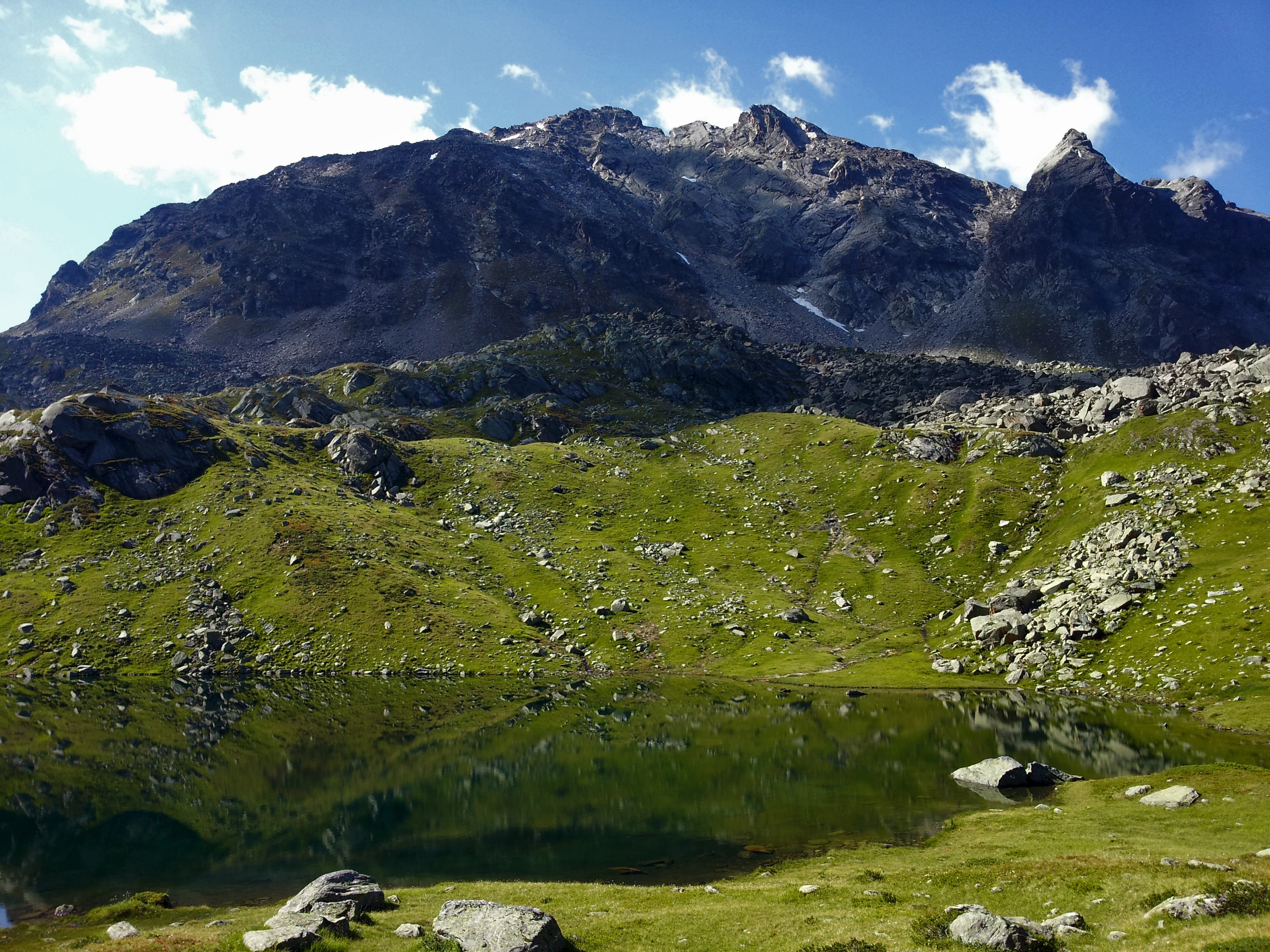

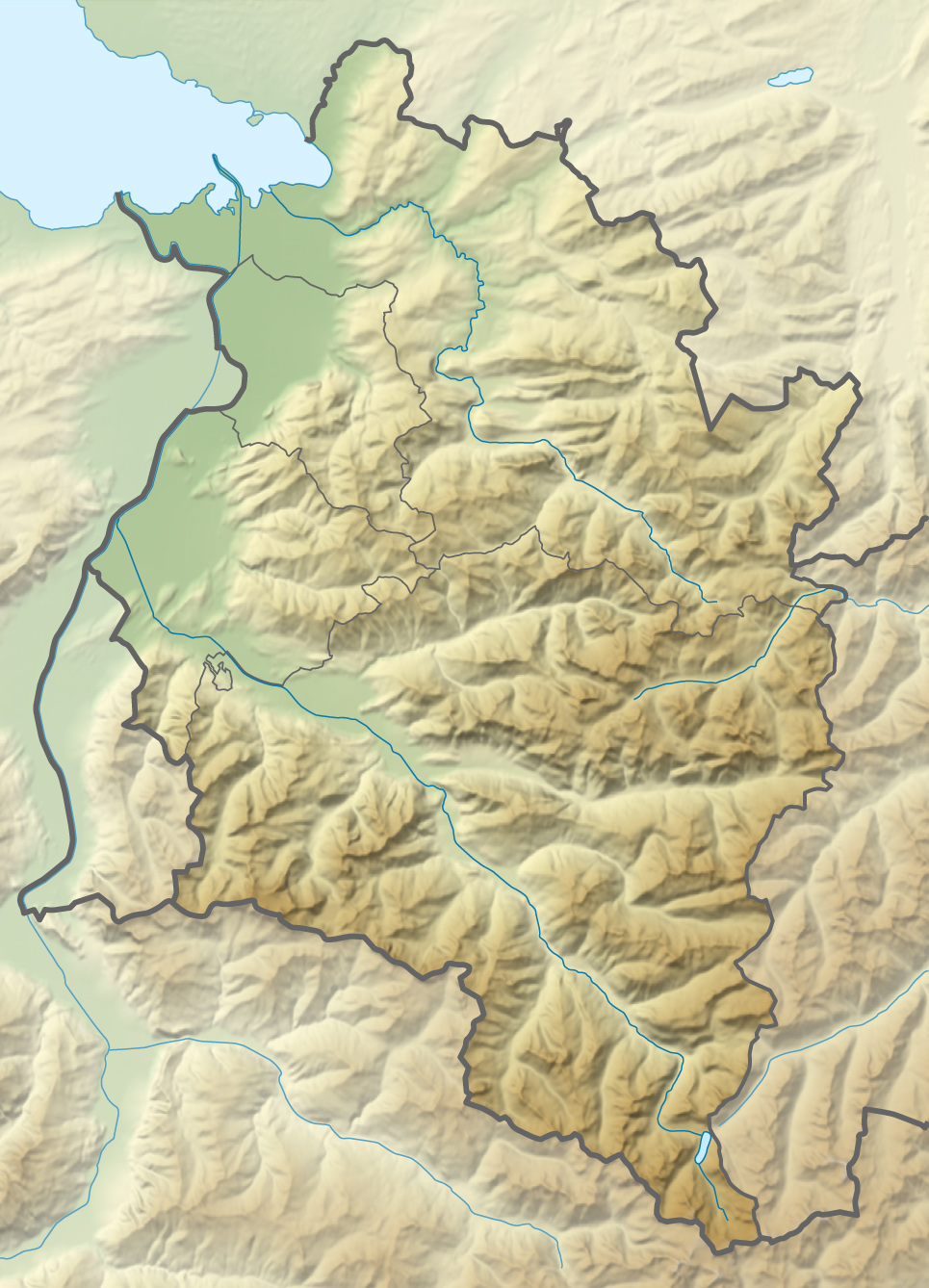
- Location within Vorarlberg
- Location: Vorarlberg
- Coordinates: 46°56′55″N 10°07′11″E
- Type: mountain lake
- Primary inflows: Vallülabach
- Primary outflows: Vallülabach
- Basin countries: Austria
- Max. length: 200 m (660 ft)
- Max. width: 200 m (660 ft)
- Surface area: ca. 4 ha (9.9 acres)
- Surface elevation: 2,500 m (8,200 ft)

Lake Vallüla (German Vallülasee) is a mountain lake located in Montafon, Austria. This secluded area on Mount Vallüla can only be reached on foot due to its high elevation and rough terrain. The climb takes approximately 5 hours.

The mountain lake possesses clear, chilly drinking water. The Vallülabach (length: ~ 5 km) feeds and drains the lake and merges with the river Ill. Fishes such as trout can be found in the water.
