= Frantschach-St. Gertraud =

- Municipality
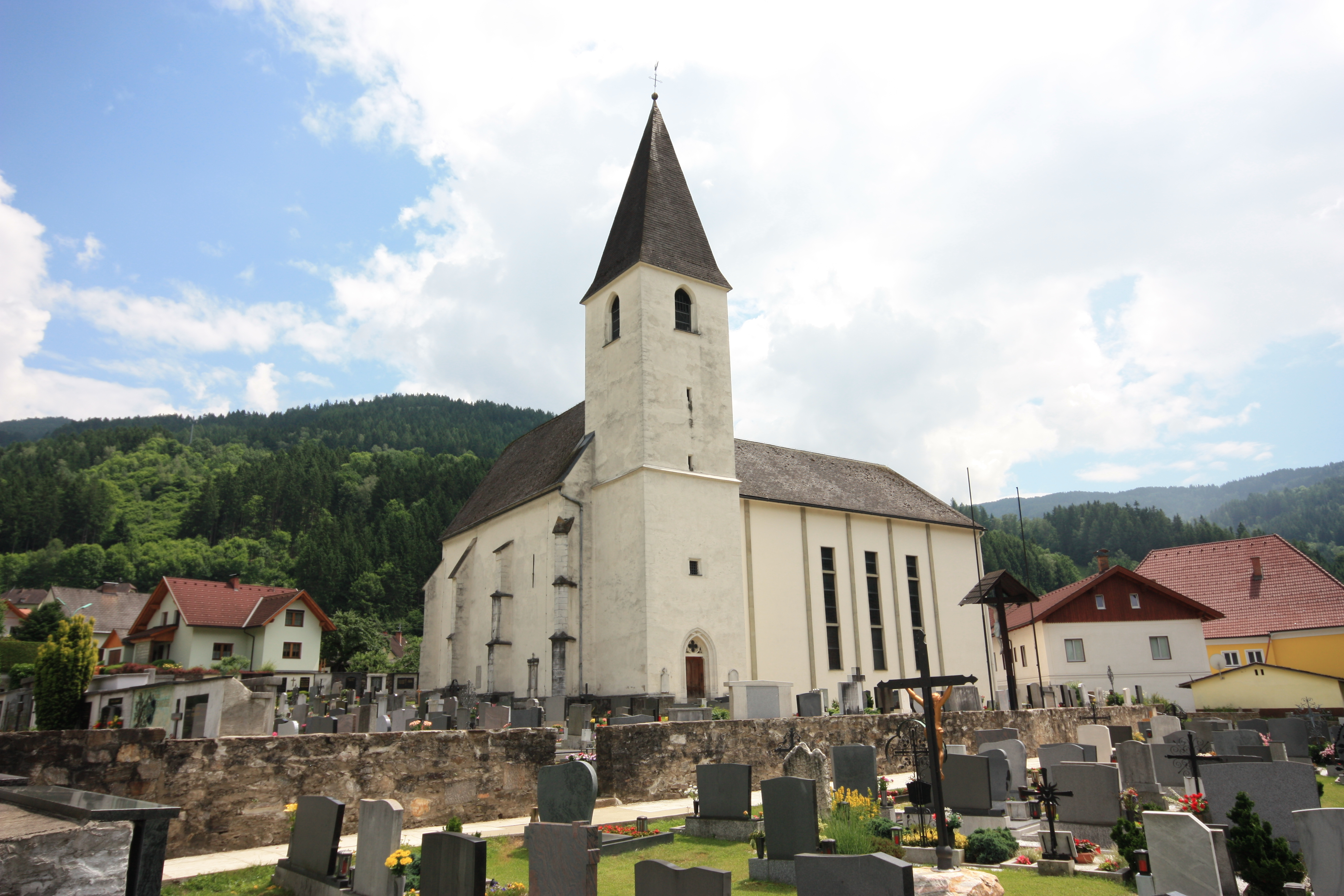
- Church

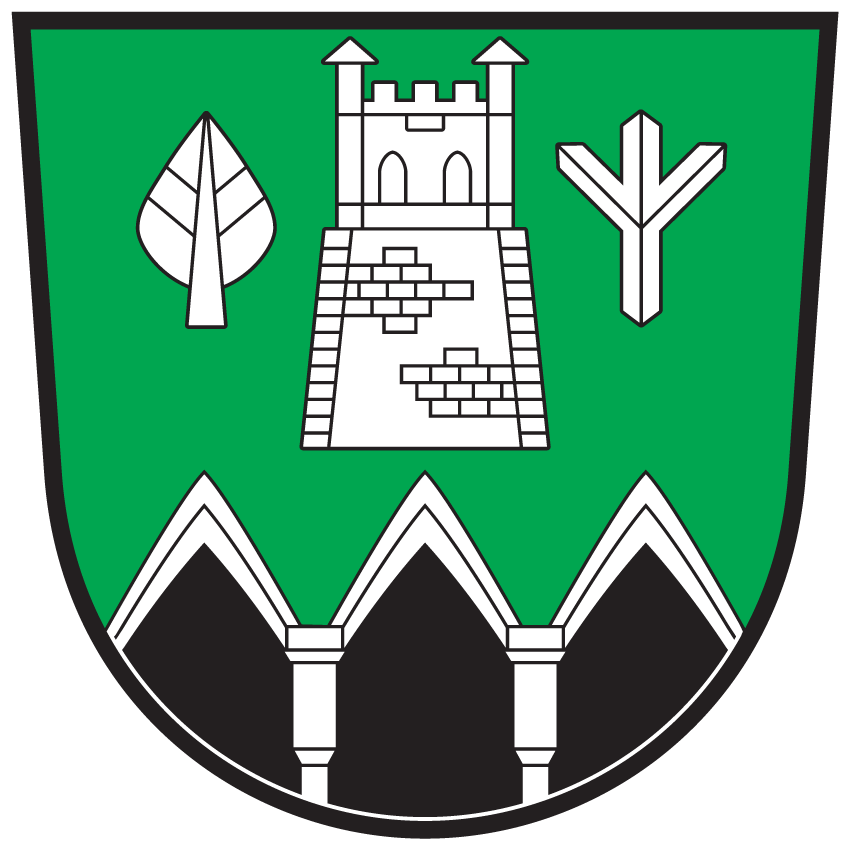
- Coat of arms

- Location within Austria
- Coordinates: 46°52′N 14°52′E
- Country: Austria
- State: Carinthia
- District: Wolfsberg

Government
  - Mayor: Günther Vallant

Area
  - Total: 100.97 km^{2} (38.98 sq mi)
- Elevation: 503 m (1,650 ft)

Population (2018-01-01)
  - Total: 2,605
  - Density: 25.80/km^{2} (66.82/sq mi)
- Time zone: UTC+1 (CET)
  - Summer (DST): UTC+2 (CEST)
- Postal code: 9413
- Area code: 04252
- Website: www.frantschach-st-gertraud.gv.at

Frantschach-St. Gertraud is a town in the district of Wolfsberg in the Austrian state of Carinthia.

== Geography ==
The municipality lies north of Wolfsberg on the boundary with Styria.
