= Reichenfels =

- Municipality
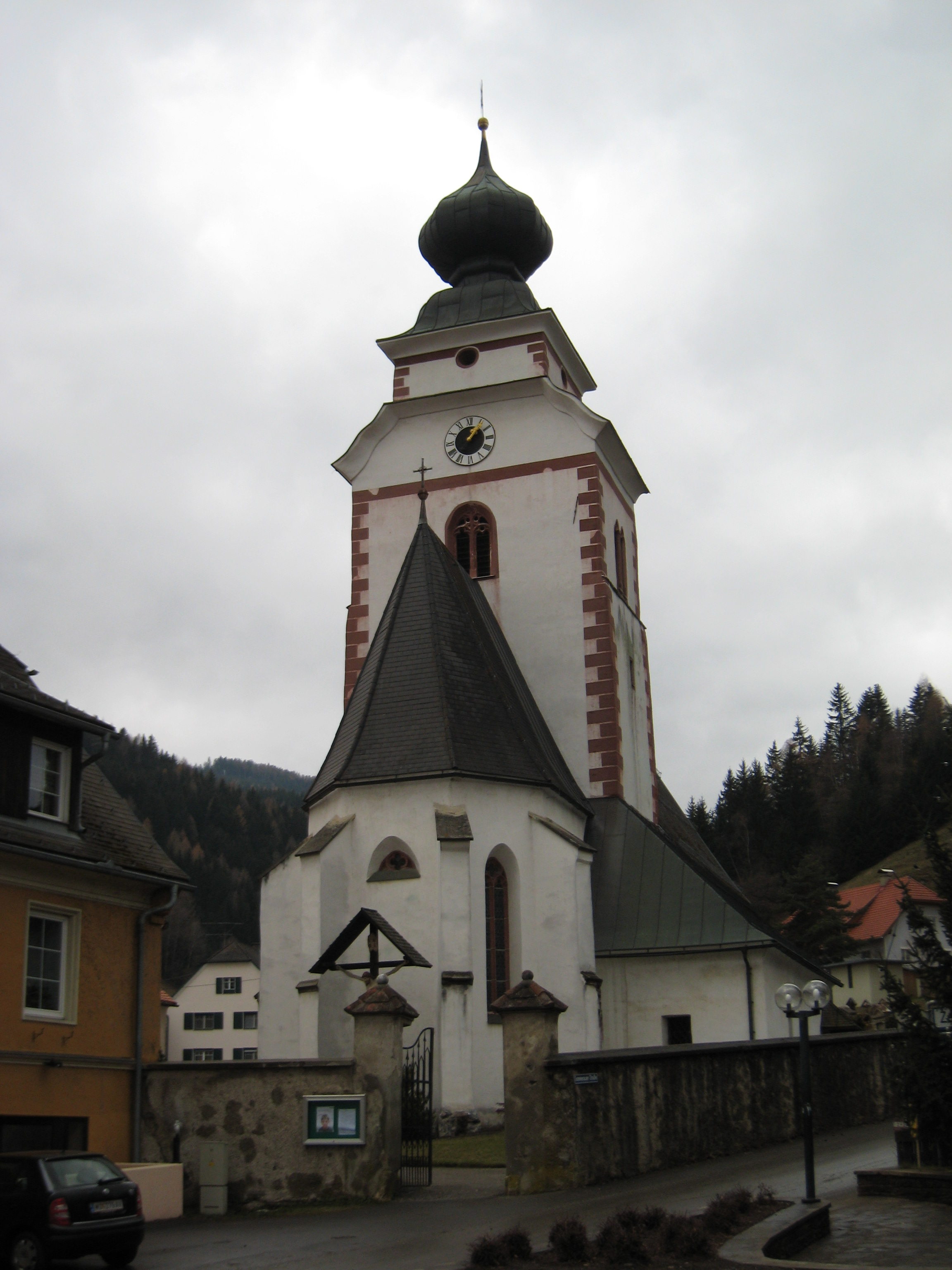
- Reichenfels parish church

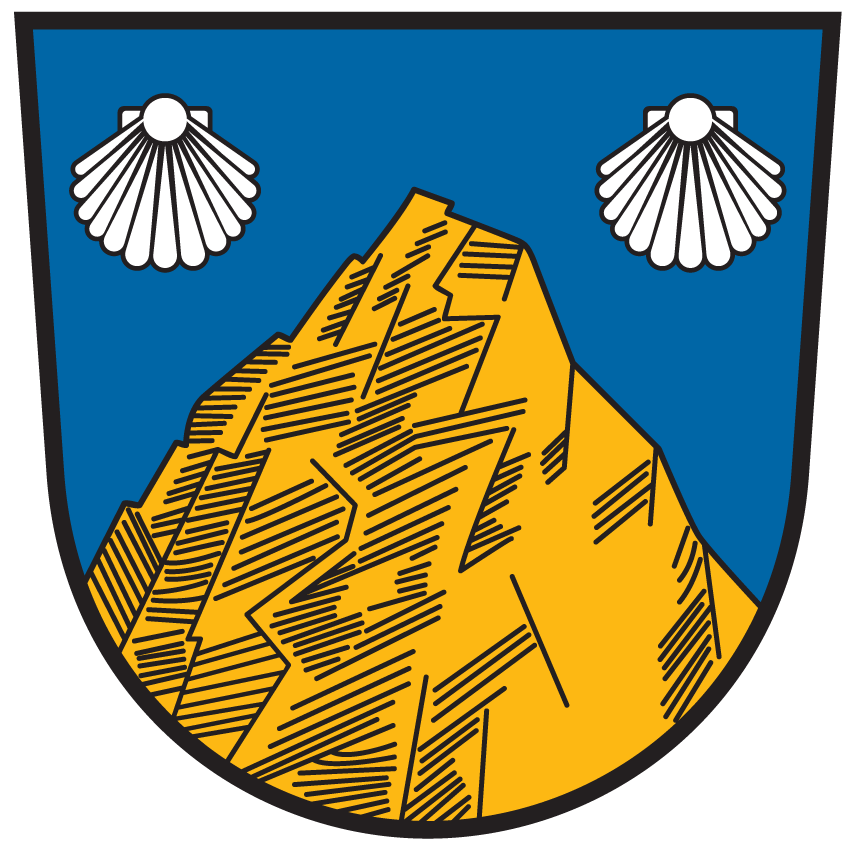
- Coat of arms

- Location within Austria
- Coordinates: 47°0′N 14°45′E
- Country: Austria
- State: Carinthia
- District: Wolfsberg

Government
  - Mayor: Manfred Führer

Area
  - Total: 87.21 km^{2} (33.67 sq mi)
- Elevation: 809 m (2,654 ft)

Population (2018-01-01)
  - Total: 1,851
  - Density: 21.22/km^{2} (54.97/sq mi)
- Time zone: UTC+1 (CET)
  - Summer (DST): UTC+2 (CEST)
- Postal code: 9463
- Area code: 04359
- Website: www.marktgemeinde-reichenfels.at

Reichenfels is a town in the district of Wolfsberg in the Austrian state of Carinthia.

== Geography ==
Reichenfels lies in the upper Lavant River valley between the Packalp and the Seetal Alps on the boundary with Styria. Neighbouring municipalities in Carinthia are Bad Sankt Leonhard and Hüttenberg.
