= Ranna Pumped Storage Power Station =

Architectural structure

Coordinates: 48°31′04″N 13°46′49″E

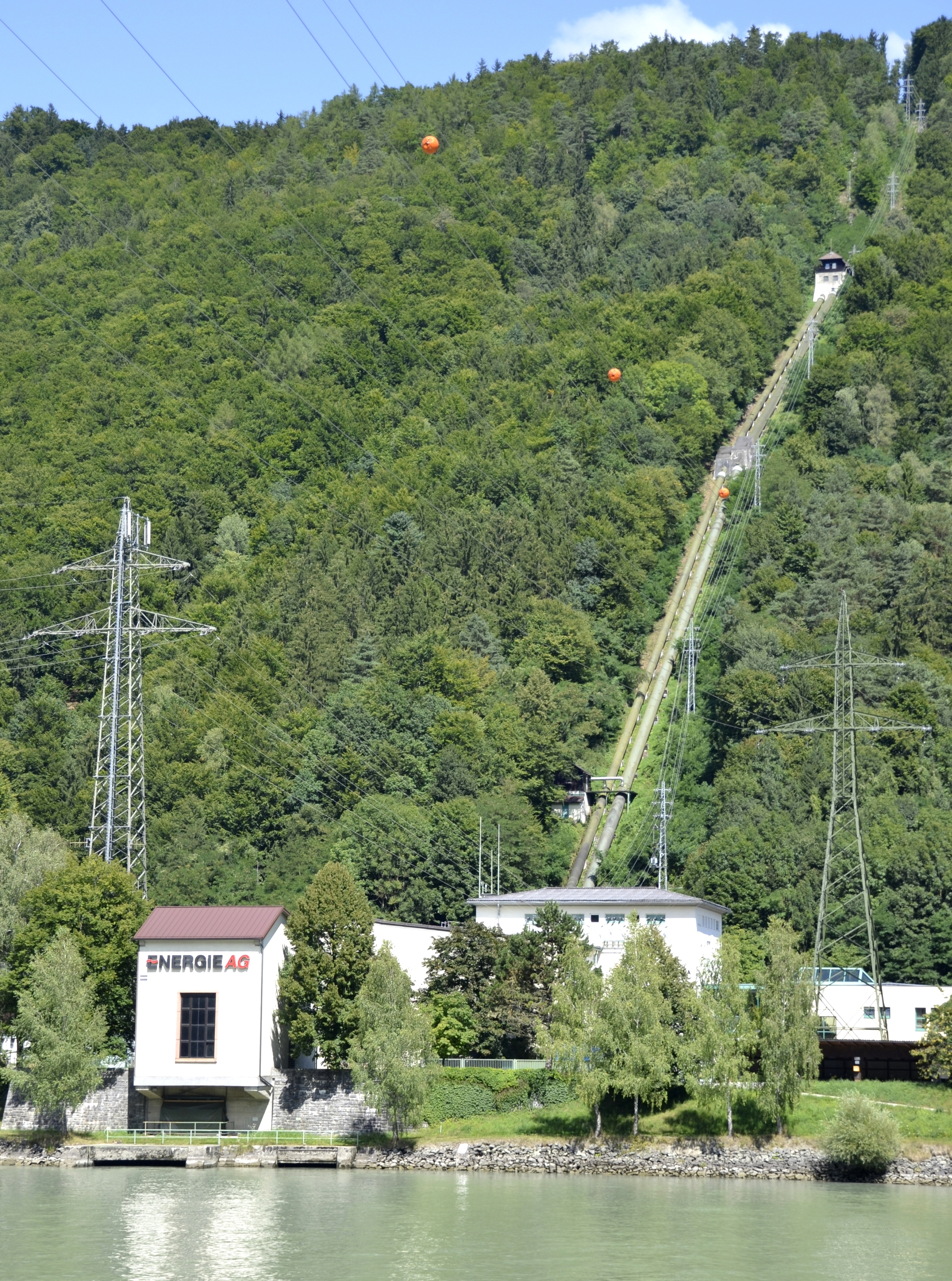
Pumpspeicherkraftwerk Ranna

Ranna Pumped Storage Power Station is a pumped storage hydroelectricity power plant of Upper Austria. It is located at lake Ranna which is situated at the river Danube. The Ranna Pumped Storage Power Station uses the dammed water of the river Ranna which merges into the river Danube closely behind the power station. With its commissioning in 1925 it is one of the oldest power stations in the Austrian Mühlviertel region. As a Pumped Storage Power Station, it is able to pump water from the river Danube into the Ranna Valley storage tanks in times of weak consumer demand. This is possible because the tanks are located at a higher altitude than the river. In times of high consumer demand the water is released into the other direction where it produces electricity by running through turbines.

== History ==
Between 1923 and 1925 the company Stern & Hafferl built a power station with a weir to rim the river Ranna. The entire power capacity of the bottleneck solution then equaled 5.8 MW.

From 1947 to 1954 an extensive expansion followed. It was initiated by the Austrian Powerplant Corporation (today: Energie AG Oberösterreich). During the expansion, the Ranna Valley Dam was built, and the existing simple power station was upgraded to a pumped storage power station. The power capacity of the power station was hereby tripled.

On 1 February 1962 there was a fraction of the water tunnel above the power plant. On this occasion, roundabout 10000 m³ of water cascaded down the valley. The consequences were landslides as well as damages at a nearby agricultural enterprise. As the pressure tunnel had to be reconditioned, the power generation had to be put down for a longer period. At the power station building itself only minor damages followed from the incident.

At the end of August 2014, the reservoir lake had to be emptied completely due to necessary works of maintenance on the technical equipment. During this phase, a planned temporary resettlement of the fish stock in the lake took place. As part of the revision a new closing cap was built into the bottom outlet. Further, the dam wall and water tunnel were checked for malfunctions.

Up until the beginning of 2012 the power station served as one of four regional control centres, in which the power station of Partenstein was steered. Today the Ranna Pumped Storage Power Station is steered by the „Leitstelle Wasserkraft“ in Gmunden, just like all hydroelectric power stations maintained by Energie AG Oberösterreich.
