= Hirzkar Lake =

Lake in upper Austria

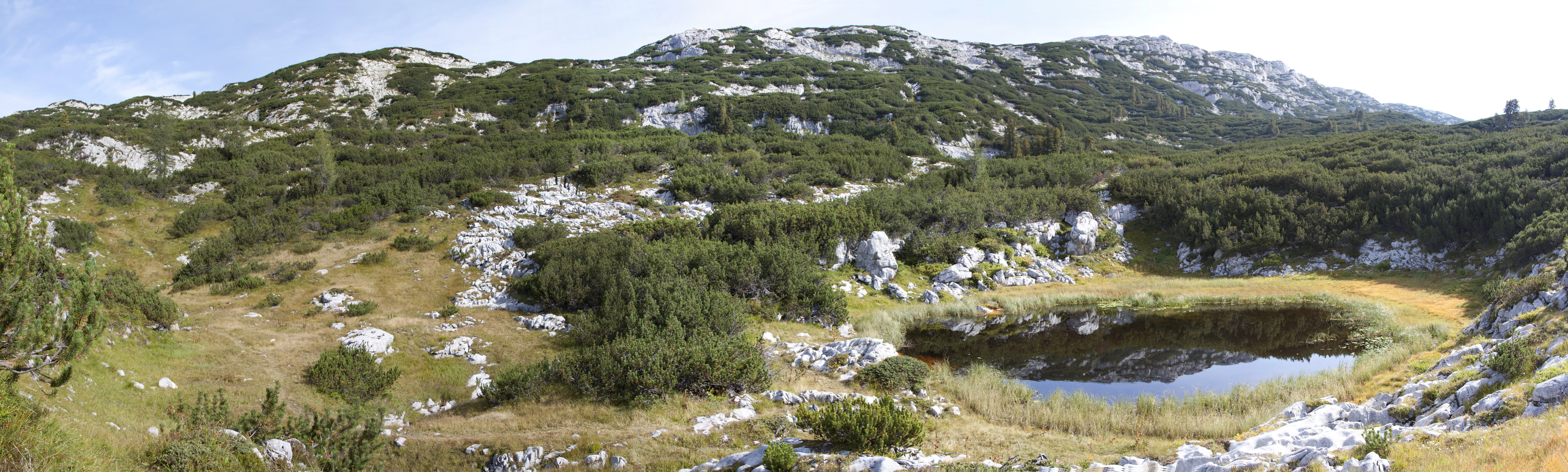
- Hirzkar Lake and hiking trail

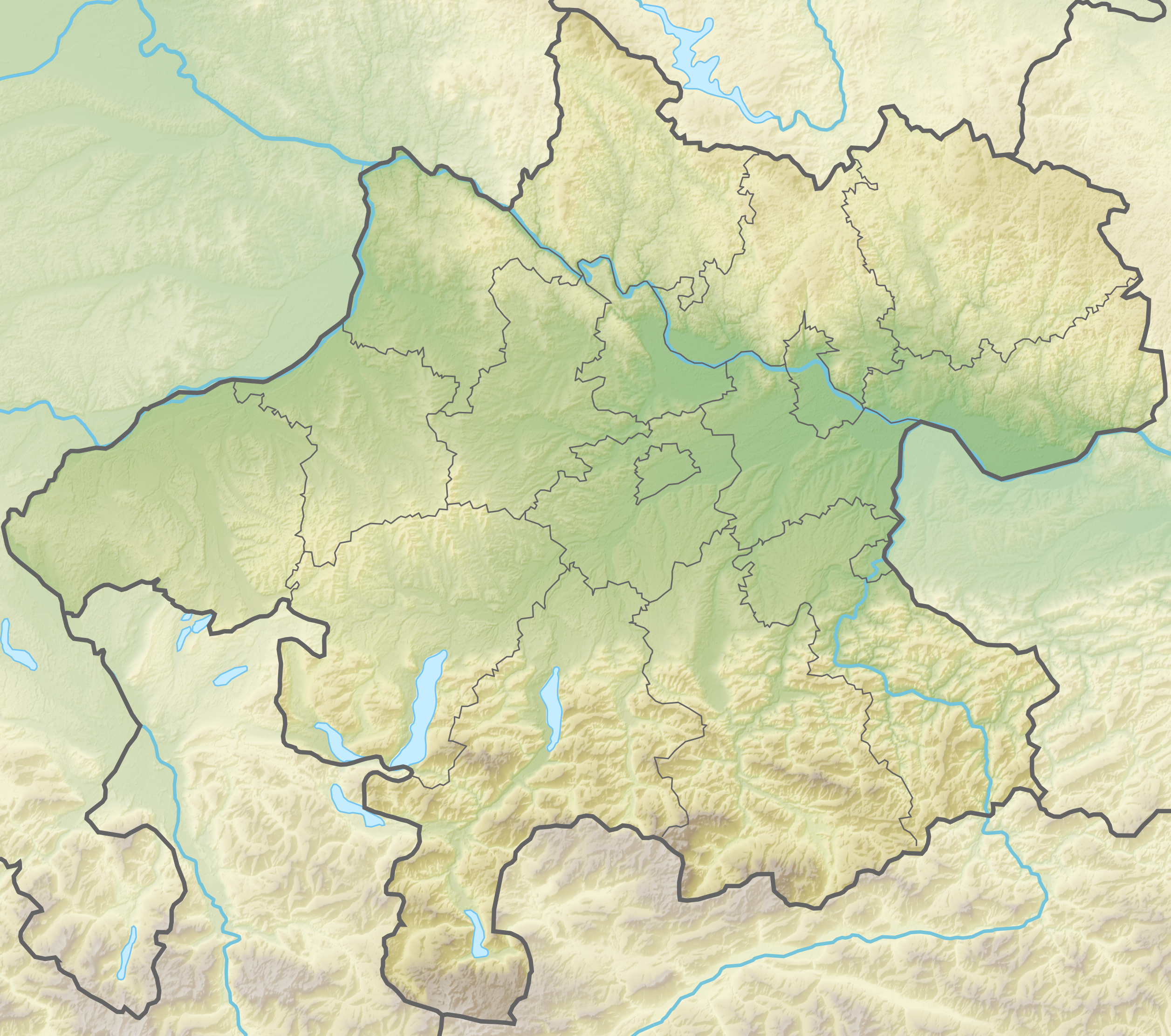
- Location within Upper Austria
- Location: Upper Austria
- Coordinates: 47°30′40″N 13°41′40″E
- Type: mountain lake
- Basin countries: Austria
- Settlements: Gmunden

Hirzkar Lake (German: Hirzkarseelein) is a group of small lakes in Upper Austria. In the past, there were more lakes but many have since dried up.

A hiking trail connects the lake area to Krippeneck and a cable car located at Gjaidstein.
