= Stausee Margaritze =

- Location within Austria
- Location: Carinthia, Austria
- Coordinates: 47°03′56″N 12°45′47″E
- Type: lake

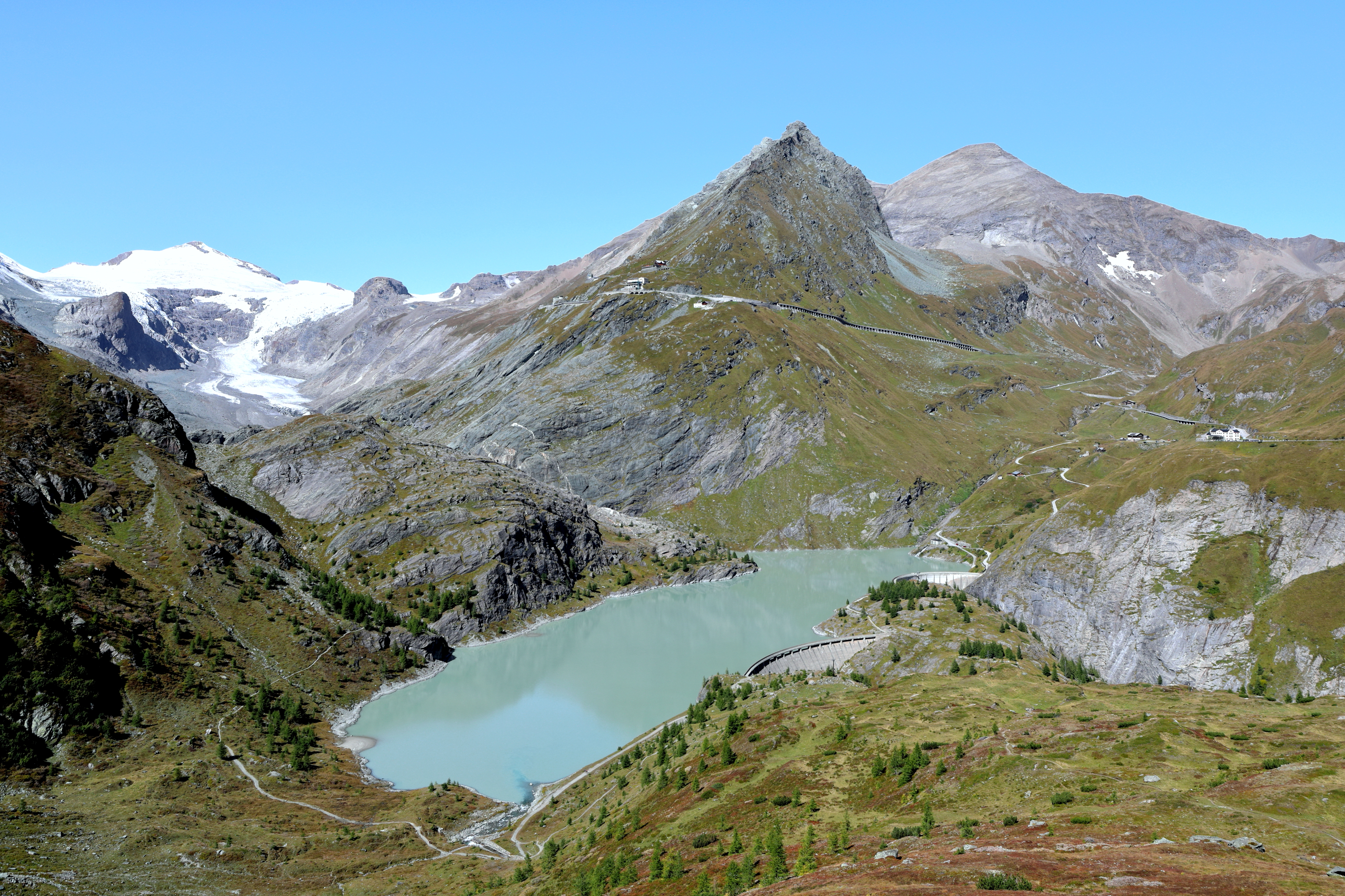
South-southeast view of the Margaritze reservoir

Stausee Margaritze is a lake of Carinthia, Austria. It is the source of the Möll.
