= Soboth Pass =

Mountain Pass in Alps

- Location within Alps
- Elevation: 1,347 metres (4,419 ft)

Third Approach
- Location: Austria
- Range: Alps
- Coordinates: 46°40′N 15°0′E

The Soboth Pass (elevation 1,347 m [4,419 ft]) is a high mountain pass in the Alps, located north of the border between Austria and Slovenia in the Austrian states of Styria and Carinthia connecting Soboth and Lavamünd.

== See also ==
- List of highest paved roads in Europe
- List of mountain passes
