= Eibiswald =

- Municipality
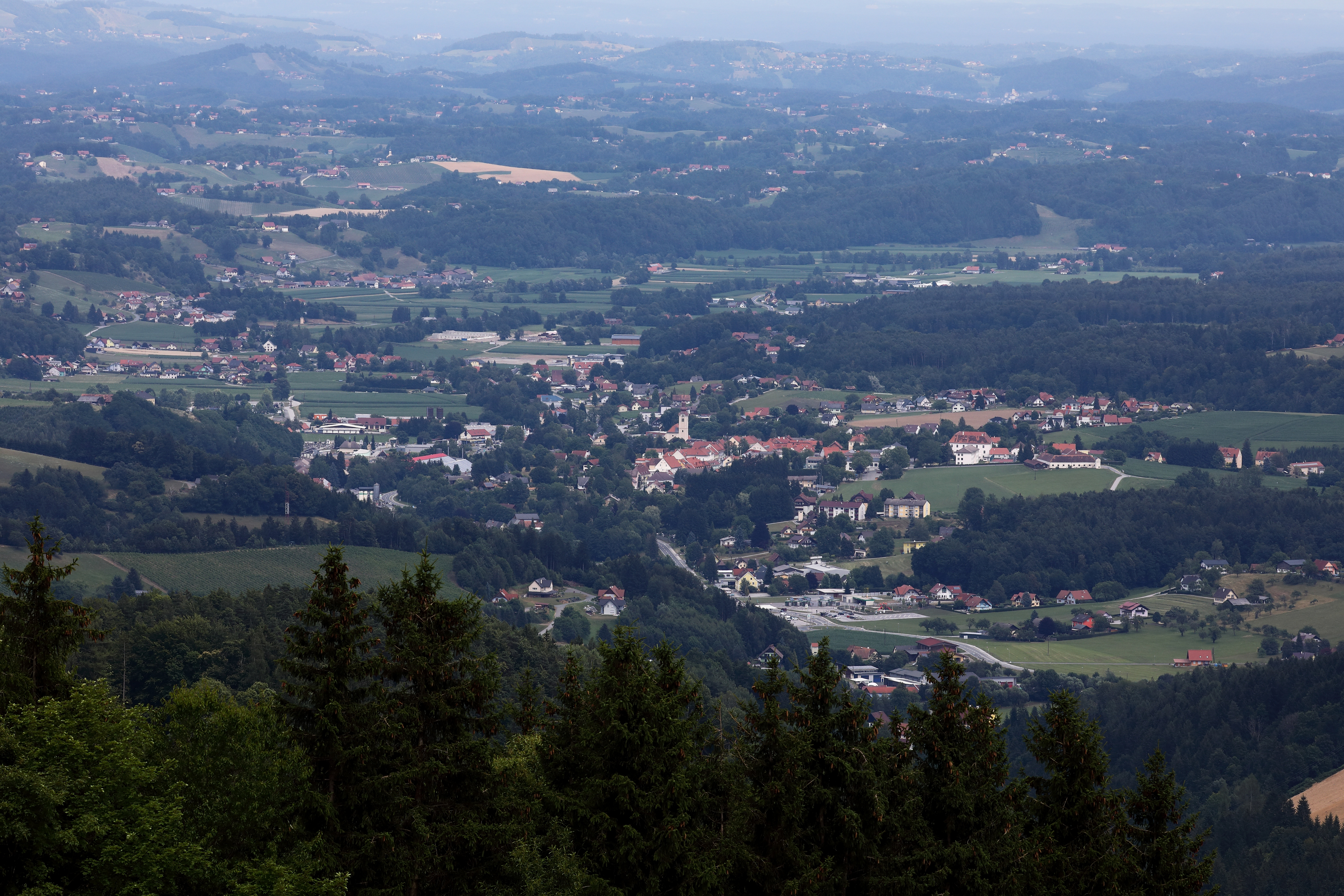
- Eibiswald from south

- Coat of arms

- Location within Austria
- Coordinates: 46°41′12″N 15°14′50″E
- Country: Austria
- State: Styria
- District: Deutschlandsberg

Government
  - Mayor: Andreas Thürschweller (SPÖ)

Area
  - Total: 152.14 km^{2} (58.74 sq mi)
- Elevation: 362 m (1,188 ft)

Population (2018-01-01)
  - Total: 6,485
  - Density: 42.63/km^{2} (110.4/sq mi)
- Time zone: UTC+1 (CET)
  - Summer (DST): UTC+2 (CEST)
- Postal code: 8552, 8553, 8554
- Area code: +43 3466, 3468, 3460
- Vehicle registration: DL
- Website: www.eibiswald.gv.at

Eibiswald (German: [ˈaɪ̯bisˌvalt]; Slovene: Ivnik) is a municipality in the district of Deutschlandsberg in the Austrian state of Styria.

== Population ==
Historical population
Year	Pop.	±%
1869	1,079	—
1880	969	−10.2%
1890	1,135	+17.1%
1900	1,173	+3.3%
1910	1,023	−12.8%
1923	925	−9.6%
1934	924	−0.1%
1939	959	+3.8%
1951	1,093	+14.0%
1961	1,198	+9.6%
1971	1,377	+14.9%
1981	1,526	+10.8%
1991	1,568	+2.8%
2001	1,476	−5.9%
2011	1,378	−6.6%
2016	6,792	+392.9%
