= Ill (Vorarlberg) =

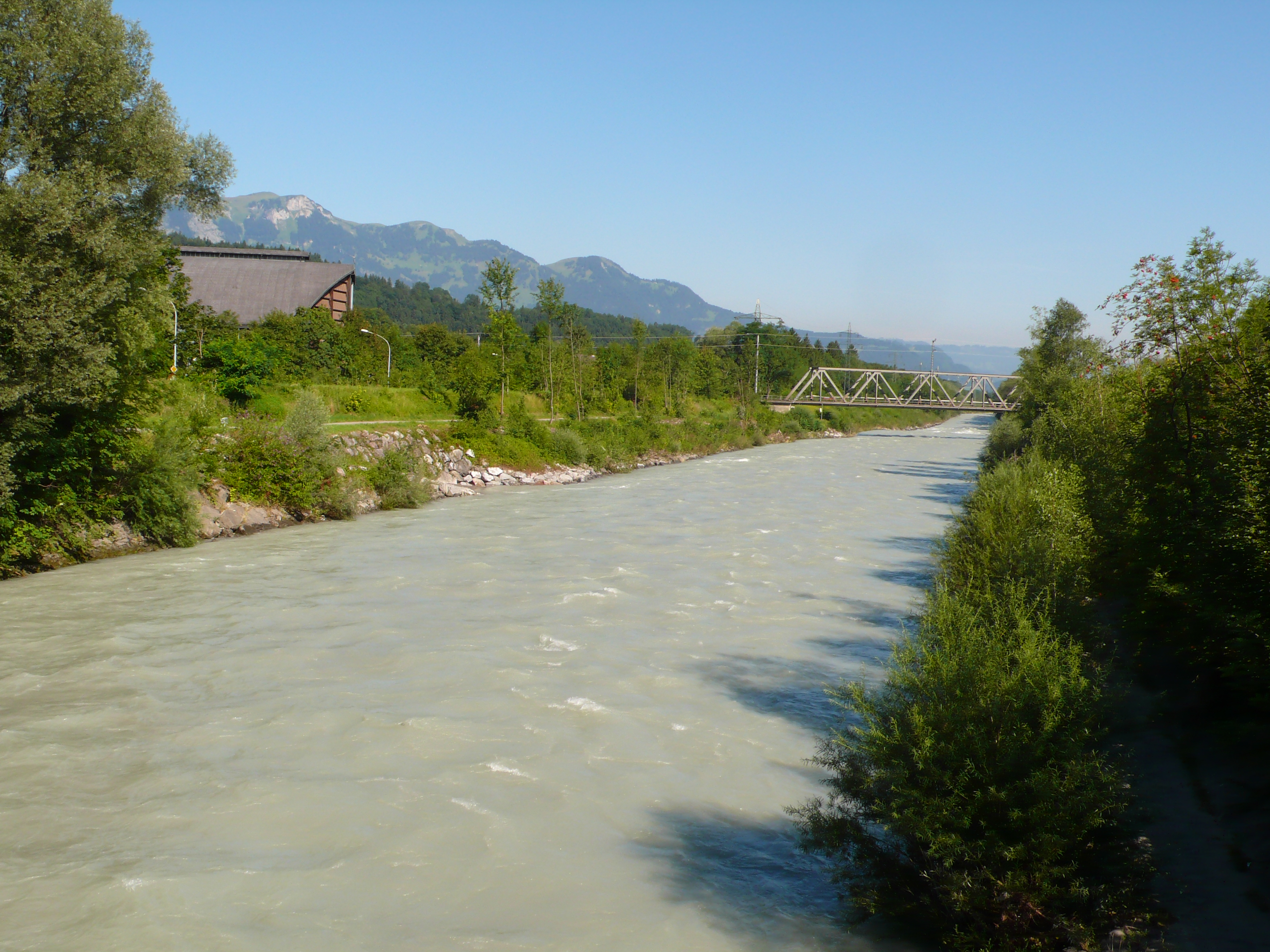
- The Ill near Gisingen (district of Feldkirch)

Location
- Country: Austria
- State: Vorarlberg

Physical characteristics
- Source
  - coordinates: 46°52′9″N 10°6′32″E
  - elevation: 2,240 m (7,350 ft)
- Mouth
  - coordinates: 47°17′57″N 9°33′31″E
  - elevation: 1,811 m (5,942 ft)
- Length: 72 km (45 mi)

Basin features
- Progression: Rhine→ North Sea

The Ill (all capitals: ILL) is a 72-kilometre-long (45 mi) tributary of the Rhine in the western Austrian state of Vorarlberg.

It flows from the northern slopes of the Silvretta mountain range and then runs north-west through Vorarlberg. The Ill passes through the Montafon and Walgau valleys and the town Feldkirch. It joins the river Rhine a few kilometers northwest of Feldkirch ("Illspitz"), at the border with Switzerland. The Ill has several dams with hydroelectric power stations.
