= Kogel =

Kogel may refer to:

== People ==
- Benedikt Kögl (1891–1969), German painter
- Debbie Koegel (born 1977), American ice dancer
- Jürgen Kögel (born 1958), German politician
- Karl Kögel (1917–1945), German ice hockey player
- Leon de Kogel (born 1991), Dutch football player and coach
- Mike Kogel, lead singer of Los Bravos
- Max Koegel (1895–1946), Nazi officer
- Pierre Kogel (born 1887), Belgian football player and coach
- Rebekka de Kogel-Kadijk (born 1979), Dutch volleyball player

== Places ==
- Kogel, Mecklenburg-Vorpommern, Germany
- Kogel Say, Afghanistan
- Roter Kogel, a mountain in Austria
- Weißer Kogel, a mountain in Austria

== Other ==
- Kogel Bearings, a bicycle manufacturer
- Kogel mogel, a dessert
- Kögel Trailer, a vehicle manufacturer

== See also ==
- Kagel (disambiguation)
- Koegel (disambiguation)
