= Schaufelspitze (Stubai Alps) =

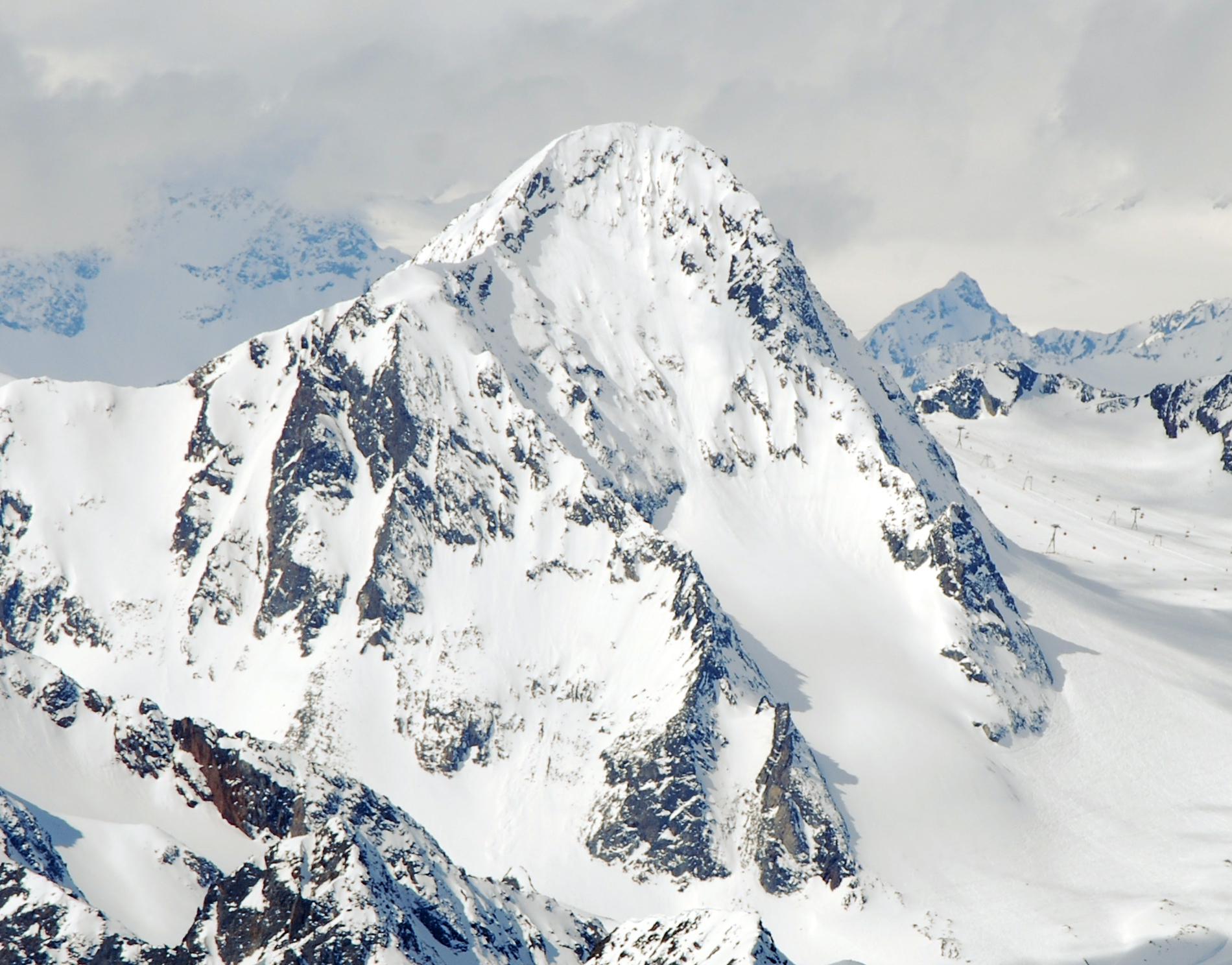
- The Schaufelspitze from the northeast (Habicht)

Highest point
- Elevation: 3,332 m (AA) (10,932 ft)
- Prominence: 216 m ↓ Bildstöckljoch
- Isolation: 1.3 km → Stubaier Wildspitze
- Coordinates: 46°58′42″N 11°06′57″E

Geography
- Location within Austria
- Location: Tyrol, Austria
- Parent range: Stubai Alps

Climbing
- First ascent: 1862 by Joseph Anton Specht and A. Taufer (tourists)
- Normal route: from Isidornieder in the southwest over blockwork (Blockwerk)

The Schaufelspitze is a mountain, 3,332 m (AA), in the Stubai Alps in the Austrian state of Tyrol.

Its summit is easily accessible to experienced mountaineers from the top station of the Stubai Glacier lift on the Schaufeljoch (also Isidornieder) at 3,158 m west of the peak. Other ascents are the North Arête (UIAA grade III) and the Northeast Arête (also grade III). The route taken by the first climbers was a grade II and ran from the Schaufelnieder (Fernaujoch), in the southeast, to the summit.

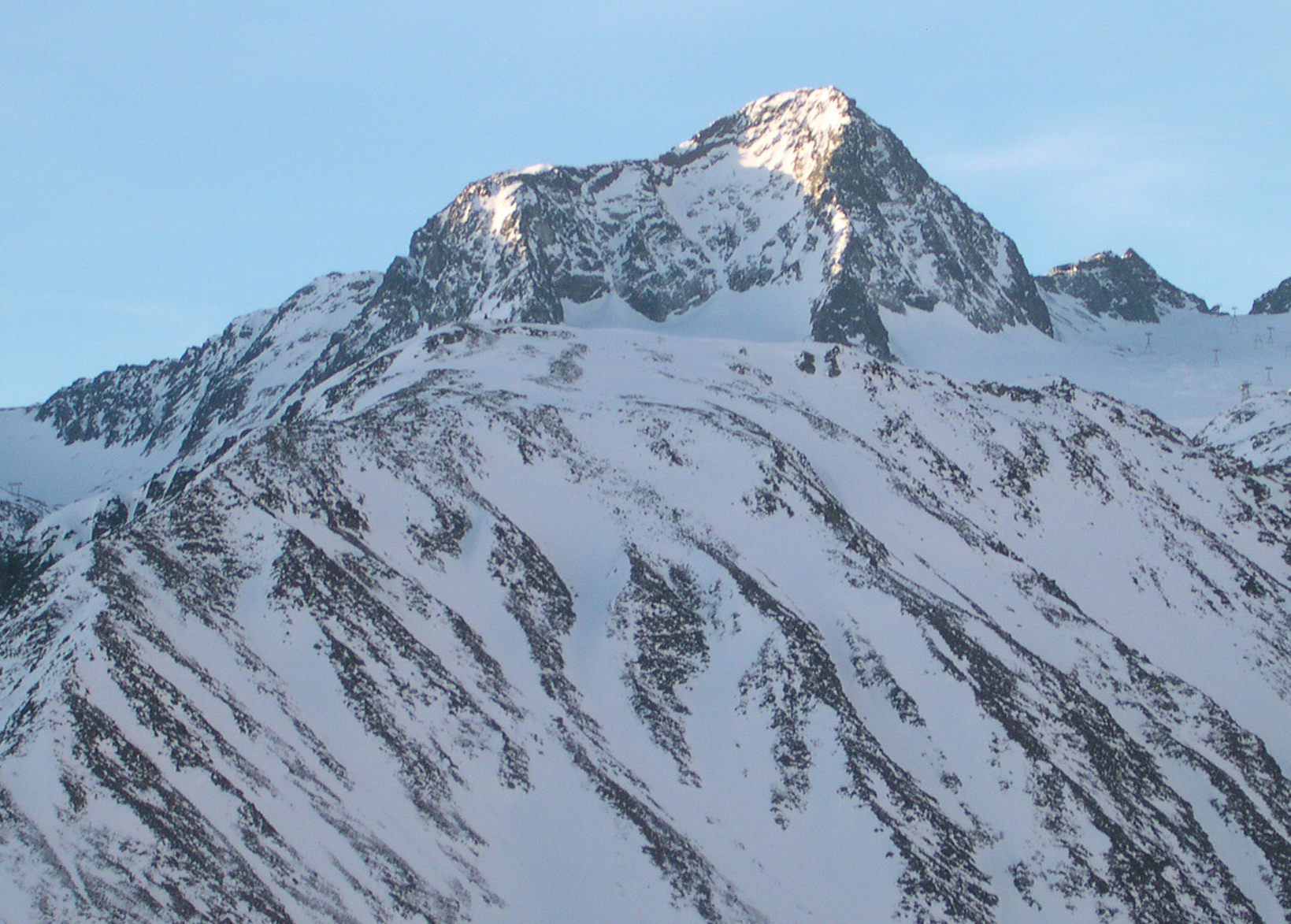
The Schaufelspitze from the northeast

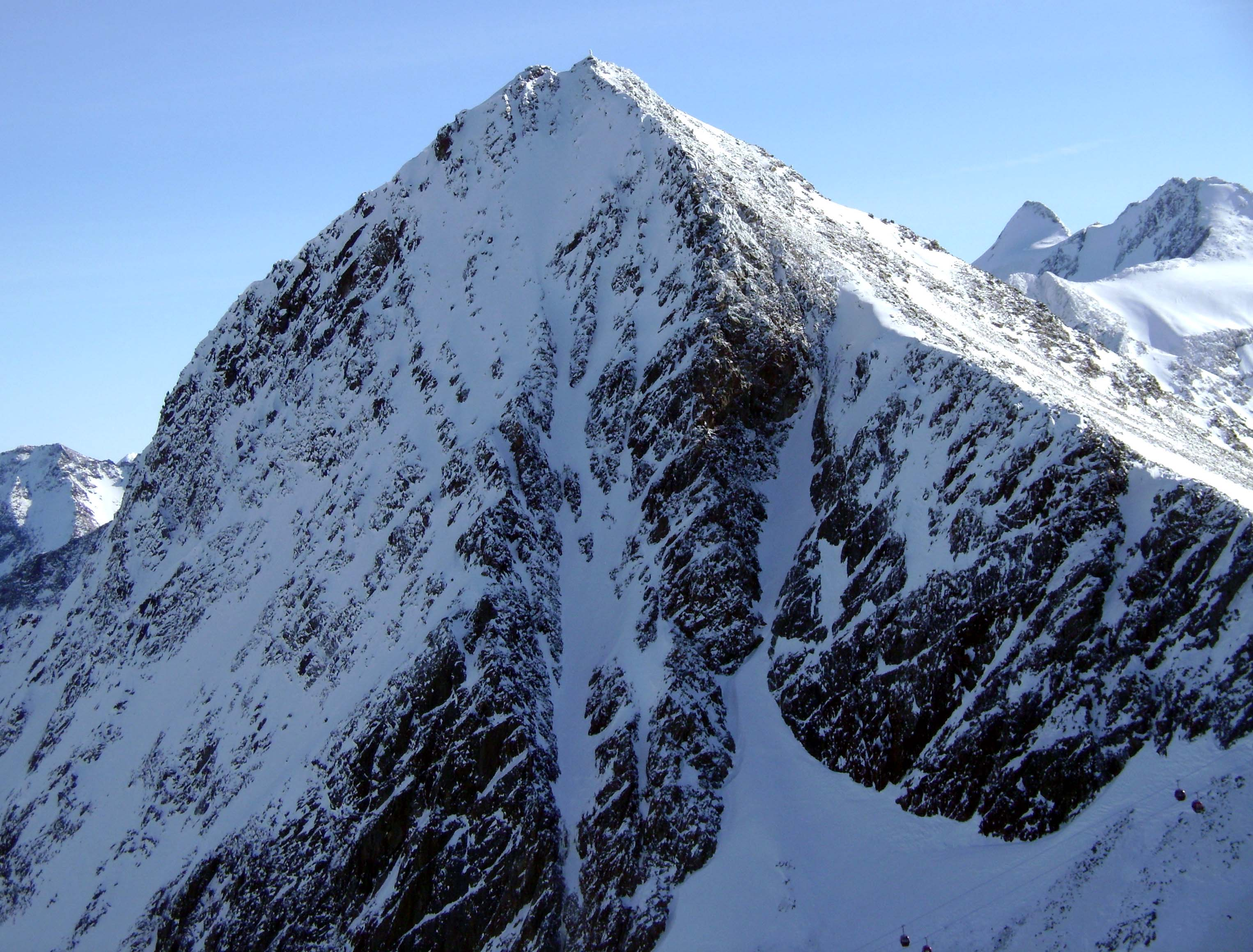
The Schaufelspitze from the northwest. Behind: the Zuckerhütl and Pfaffenschneide. Front right: the Schaufeljoch lift.

== Literature ==
- Walter Klier (1980), Stubaier Alpen, Alpine Club Guide (in German), Munich: Rother Bergverlag, ISBN 3-7633-1212-9
