= Innere Wetterspitze =

Austrian alpine mountain

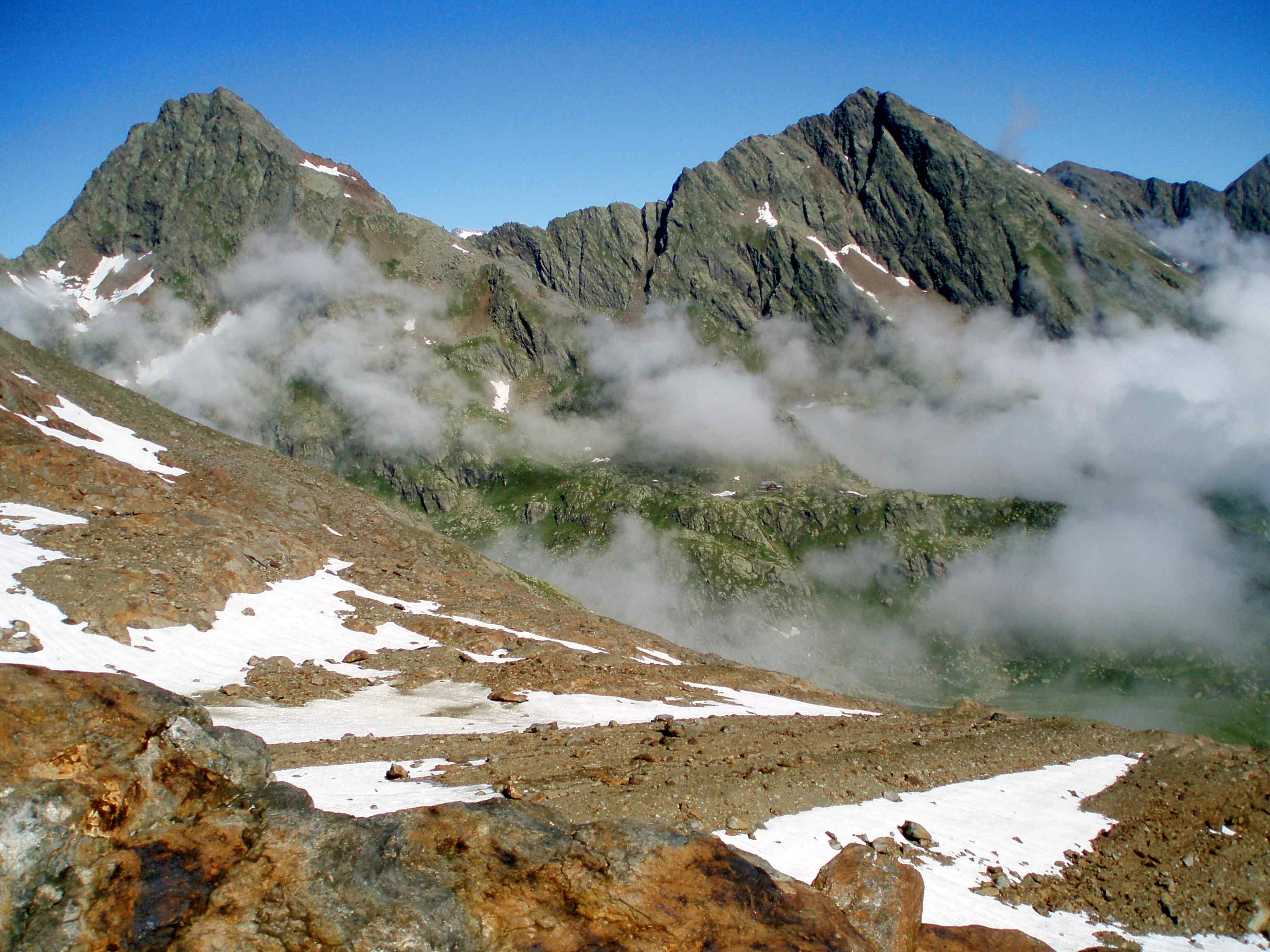
- The Innere (left) and Äußere Wetterspitze from the southeast

Highest point
- Elevation: 3,053 m (AA) (10,016 ft)
- Prominence: 292 m ↓ Lautererseejoch
- Isolation: 1.37 km → Äußere Wetterspitze
- Listing: Alpine mountains above 3000 m
- Coordinates: 46°59′47″N 11°14′47″E

Geography
- Location within Austria
- Location: Habichtkamm, Tyrol, Austria
- Parent range: Stubai Alps

The Innere Wetterspitze is a mountain, 3,053 metres high, in the Stubai Alps in the Austrian state of Tyrol. It lies between the Stubai and Gschnitztal valleys, rising to the north of and above the col of Simmingjöchl and is separated by the Lautererseejoch from the rather higher Äußere Wetterspitze (3,070 m). The two Wetterspitzen sit on the Habichtkamm, a mountain ridge that branches off the main chain of the Alps near the Feuerstein and heads northeastwards to the Elferspitze.

== Ascents ==
The easiest ascent runs from the Bremer Hut across the east flank, over the Schneekachl and along the north arête taking three hours to reach the summit (UIAA grade I). In addition there is another waymarked path along the eastern arête. This is secured in places, very exposed and requires climbing experience at UIAA level II. From the Bremer Hut this alternative ascent needs two hours.

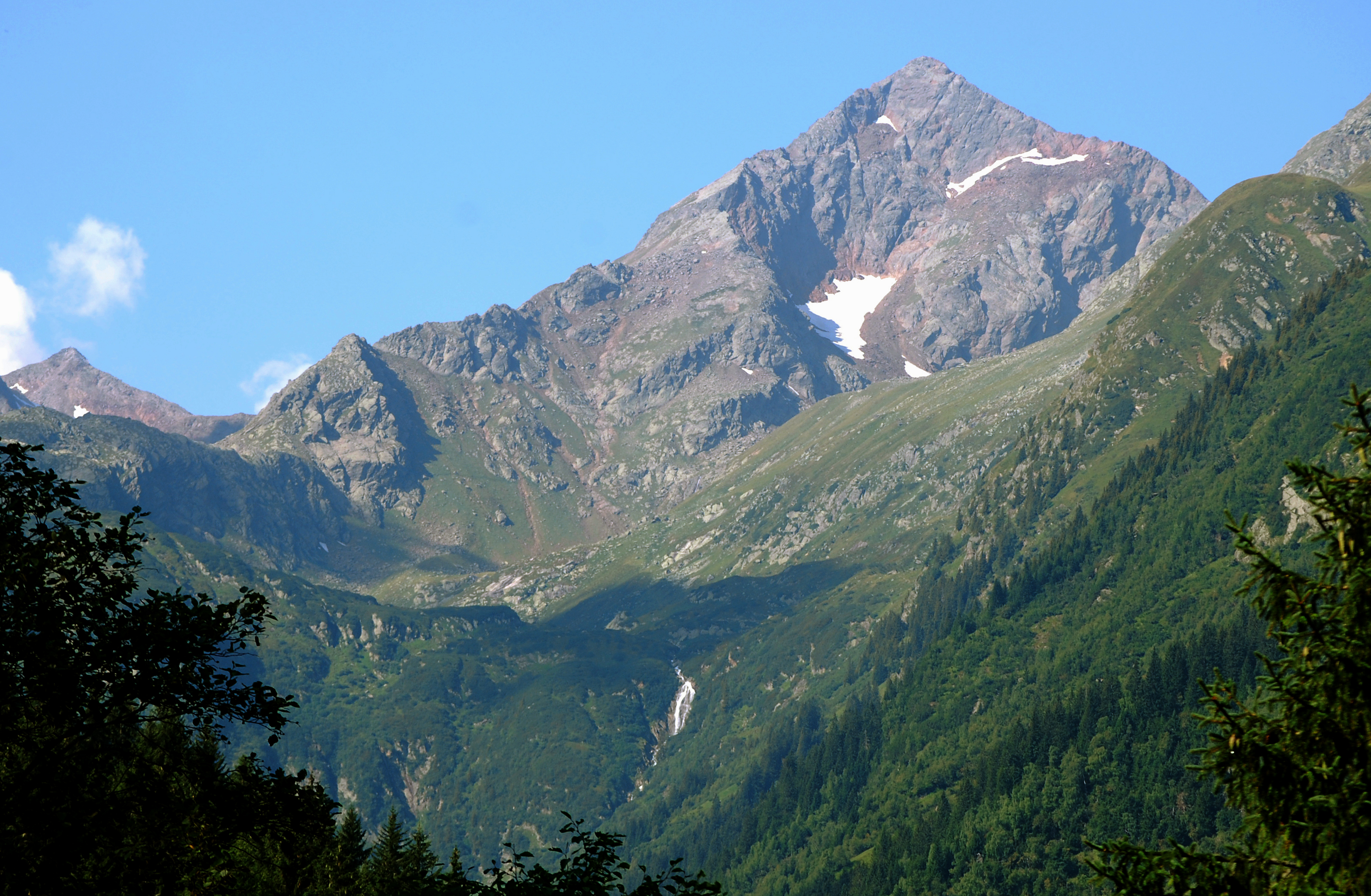
The Innere Wetterspitze from the northeast

== Literature and maps ==
- Walter Klier: Stubaier Alpen, Alpine Club Guide, Bergverlag Rudolf Rother, Munich, 2006, ISBN 3-7633-1271-4
- Alpine Club map, Sheet 31/1, 1:25,000, Stubaier Alpen; Hochstubai. ISBN 3-928777-08-4
