= Kagle =

Kagle is a surname. Notable people with the surname include:

- Bob Kagle, American businessman
- Eddie Kagle, character in Angel on My Shoulder (film)

== See also ==
- Cagle
