= Wilder Pfaff =

Mountain in Italy

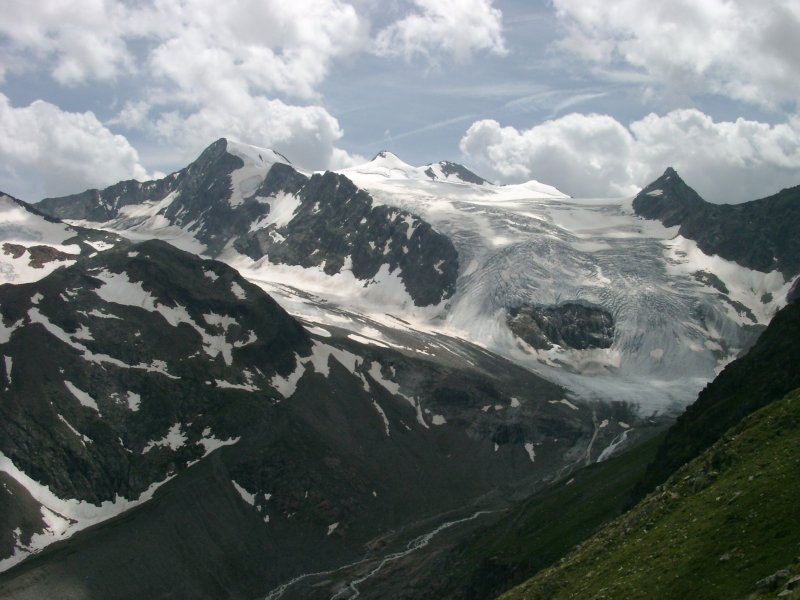
- A view from the north on the Sulzenauferner with the Wilder Pfaff (left), Zuckerhütl (middle) and Aperer Pfaff.

Highest point
- Elevation: 3,458 m (11,345 ft)
- Coordinates: 46°57′57″N 11°9′52″E

Geography
- Location: Tyrol, Austria / South Tyrol, Italy
- Parent range: Stubai Alps

Climbing
- First ascent: 26 July 1870 by Richard Gutberlet, Andrä Purtscheller and Alois Tanzer

The Wilder Pfaff is a mountain in the Stubai Alps on the border between Tyrol, Austria, and South Tyrol, Italy.
