= Jochköpfl =

Mountain in Austria

- Location within Austria

Highest point
- Elevation: 3,143 m (AA) (10,312 ft)
- Prominence: 297 m ↓ Windachscharte
- Isolation: 4.8 km → Schwarzwandspitze
- Listing: Alpine mountains above 3000 m
- Coordinates: 46°55′39″N 11°06′28″E

Geography
- Location: Tyrol, Austria
- Parent range: Stubai Alps

Geology
- Rock type: biotite-granite-gneiss

Climbing
- Normal route: South Arête (UIAA grade II)

The Jochköpfl is a mountain, 3,143 m (AA), on the Windach-Brunnenkogel-Kamm, a subgroup of the Stubai Alps in Austria.

== Geography ==
=== Name and location ===
The Jochköpfl is named after the col of Timmelsjoch and lies almost exactly on the border between the Austrian federal state of Tyrol and the autonomous Italian province of Bolzano-South Tyrol. The border runs about 150 metres east of the bench-mark at the summit. A prominent ridge heads south for a good kilometre from the summit. To the southwest a 700-metre-long arête ends at the notch of the Rötenkarscharte at 2,832 metres.

=== Surrounding area ===
The Jochköpfl lies about 2½ kilometres north-northeast of the Timmelsjoch (2,478 m) and around 6 km as the crow flies northwest of St. Martin am Schneeberg, South Tyrol. To the west and north of the mountain, glaciers reach a height of 3,050 metres. To the north is the Kitzkampferner glacier and, to the west, the more steeply inclined Rötenkarferner, which has shrunk significantly due to global warming. Neighbouring peaks are the 3,135-metre-high Schrakogel to the northwest, which is separated by a notch at 3,068 metres; the 3,060-metre-high Vordere Kitzkogel on the northeast arête; and the Graslahnerspitze at 2,970 metres above sea level along the south arête, which is interrupted by two unimposing, intermediate tops, the Timmelsjochberg and Hochwarte. The southwest ridge runs towards the Timmelstal valley down into the Untere Wannenkar cirque.

== First ascent ==
The Jochköpfl was probably first ascended by chamois hunters and state survey staff during the 1850s. There are no records of ascents purely for pleasure dating to the 19th century. However, on 22 August 1890, Ludwig Purtscheller undertook a crossing of all the summits on the main chain of mountains including the one now called the Jochköpfl.

== Literature and maps ==
- Walter Klier: Alpenvereinsführer Stubaier Alpen, Munich, 2006, ISBN 3-7633-1271-4
- Alpenvereinskarte 1:25.000, Blatt 31/1, Stubaier Alpen, Hochstubai
