= Serles =

Mountain in Tyrol, Austria

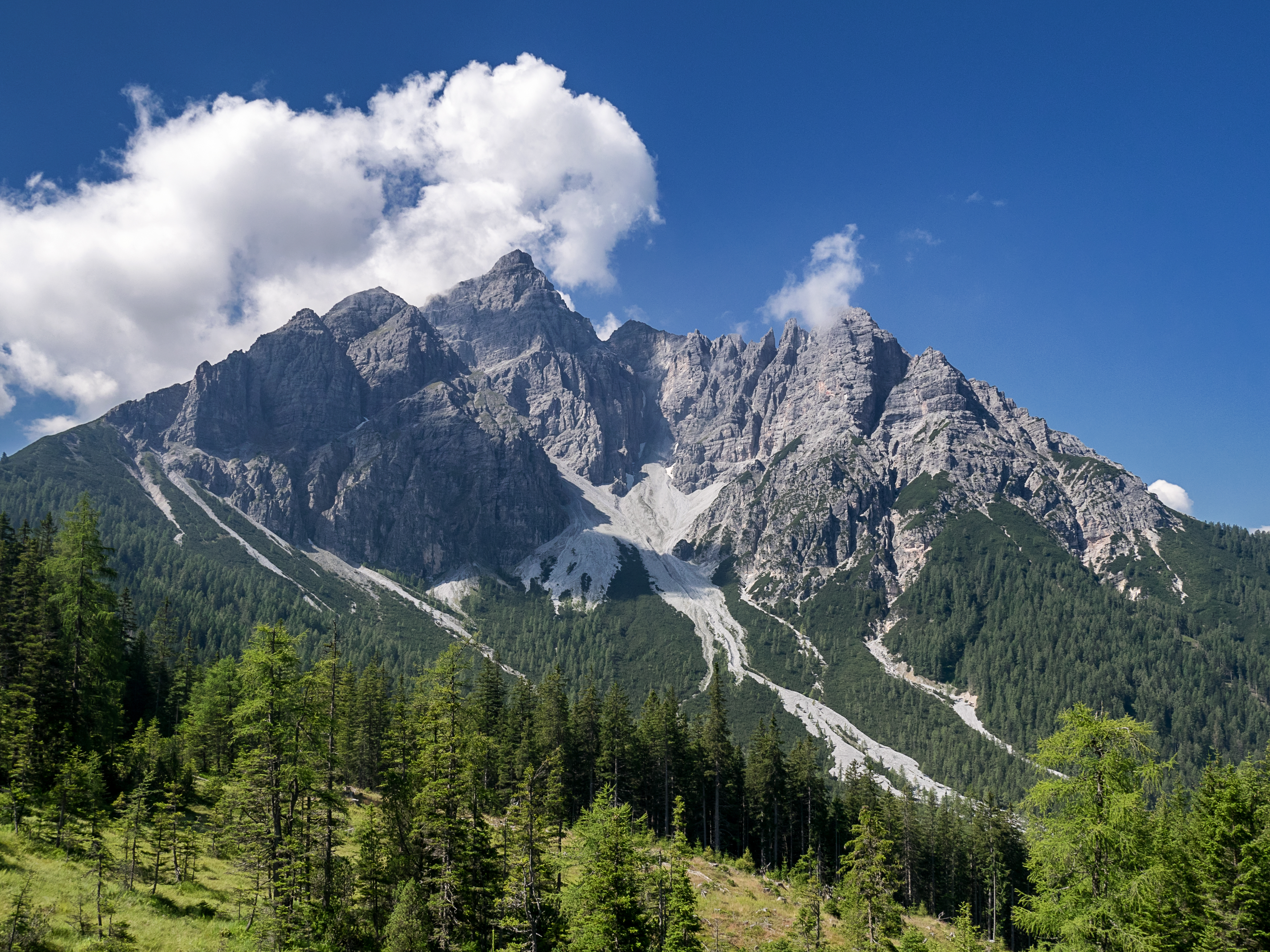
- Serles, view direction SW

Highest point
- Elevation: 2,718 m (8,917 ft)
- Prominence: 333 m (1,093 ft)
- Listing: Alpine mountains 2500-2999 m
- Coordinates: 47°07′25″N 11°22′54″E

Geography
- Location within Austria
- Location: Tyrol, Austria
- Parent range: Stubai Alps

Climbing
- First ascent: ca. 1579
- Easiest route: From Matrei am Brenner

Serles (2,718 m) is a mountain of the Stubai Alps in the Austrian state of Tyrol, Austria, between the Stubai Valley and Wipptal, near the Italian border. Its nickname is Altar von Tirol, literally the Altar of Tyrol. It has several lower peaks, including Sonnenstein (2,476 m (8,123 ft)) to the north.

Located on the edge of long ridge traversing east from Habicht, it is a popular scrambling peak and can get very crowded in the summer. The summit provides excellent view of the Stubai Alps and Zillertal Alps.

It is accessible via the Serlesjöchl:

- from Matrei am Brenner in Wipptal via Maria Waldrast (the easiest route),
- from Fulpmes and Kampl in Stubaital via Wildeben (which is just as easy, if it was not for the extra altitude to climb).
