= Gamsspitzl (Stubai Alps) =

Mountain in Austria

Coordinates: 46.9789°N 11.2024°E

The Gamsspitzl is a mountain in the Stubai Alps of Austria. The peak has a height of 3052 m.

== Facts ==
- Starting point: Sulzenau Hut (2191 m)
- Height gain: 850 m
- Duration: 3 hours ascent, plus or minus depending on weather and experience
