= Wilde Leck =

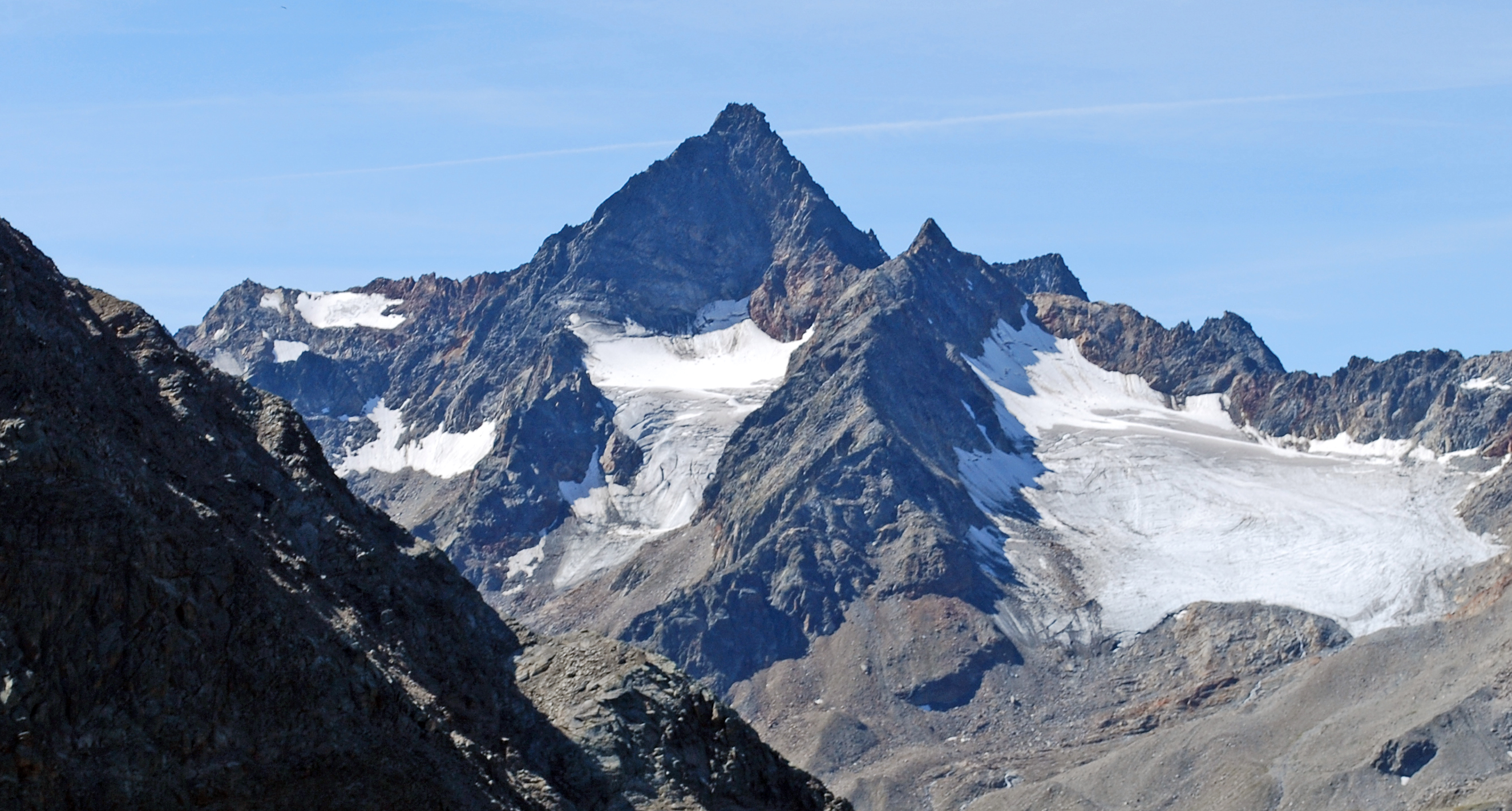
- The Wilde Leck from the northeast. Front right: the Zahme Leck.

Highest point
- Elevation: 3,359 m (AA) (11,020 ft)
- Prominence: 317 m ↓ Fernaujoch
- Isolation: 5.2 km → Schrankogel
- Listing: Alpine mountains above 3000 m
- Coordinates: 47°00′13″N 11°03′49″E

Geography
- Location within Austria
- Location: Tyrol, Austria
- Parent range: Stubai Alps

Geology
- Mountain type: G
- Rock type: Granite

Climbing
- First ascent: Zachäus Grüner from Sölden around 1865. For leisure, F. Drasch, Ludwig Purtscheller and Q. Gritsch on 1 September 1877
- Normal route: south face (grade III in one place)

The Wilde Leck is a mountain, 3,361 m (AA), in the Stubai Alps in the Austrian state of Tyrol. It rises immediately west of the Sulztalferner glacier and towers above the Ötztal valley, 5.5 km northwest of Sölden. It has a rocky summit made of solid granite and prominent arêtes. In the Stubai Alps the Wilde Leck is one of the most difficult summits to climb, because its easiest route runs initially over glaciers and then up a rock face that is assessed as climbing grade III (UIAA).

Just north of the Wilde Leck ("Wild Leck") is the Zahme Leck ("Tame Leck", 3,226 m above sea level (AA)).

== Ascents ==
- South Face (grade II - III)
- East Arête III - in one place IV

== Literature ==
- Heinrich and Walter Klier, Alpine Club Guide Stubaier Alpen, Bergverlag Rudolf Rother, Munich, 1988. ISBN 3-7633-1252-8

== Sources ==
- Hochstubai Hut
- DAV Dresden Branch
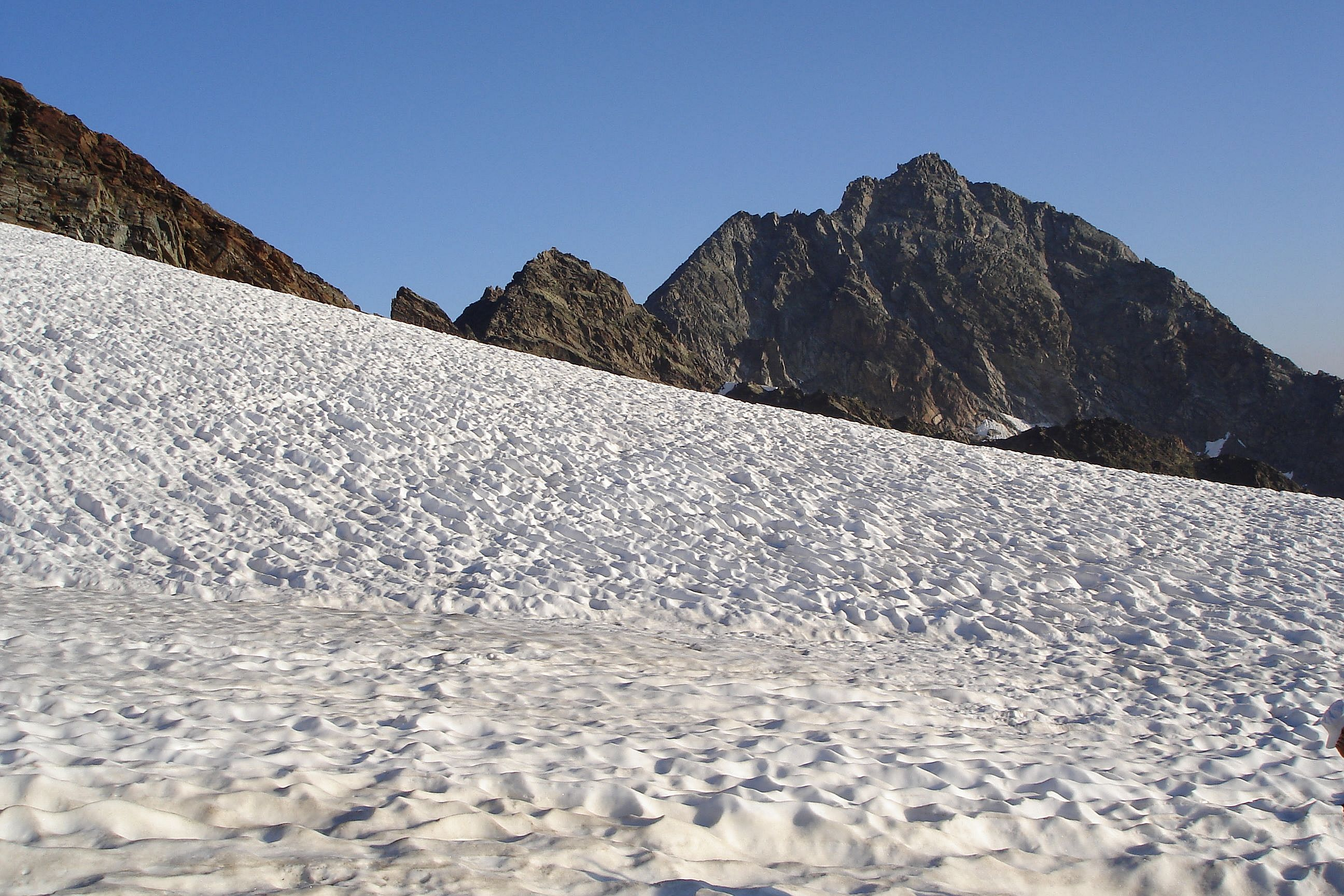
The Wilde Leck from the southeast

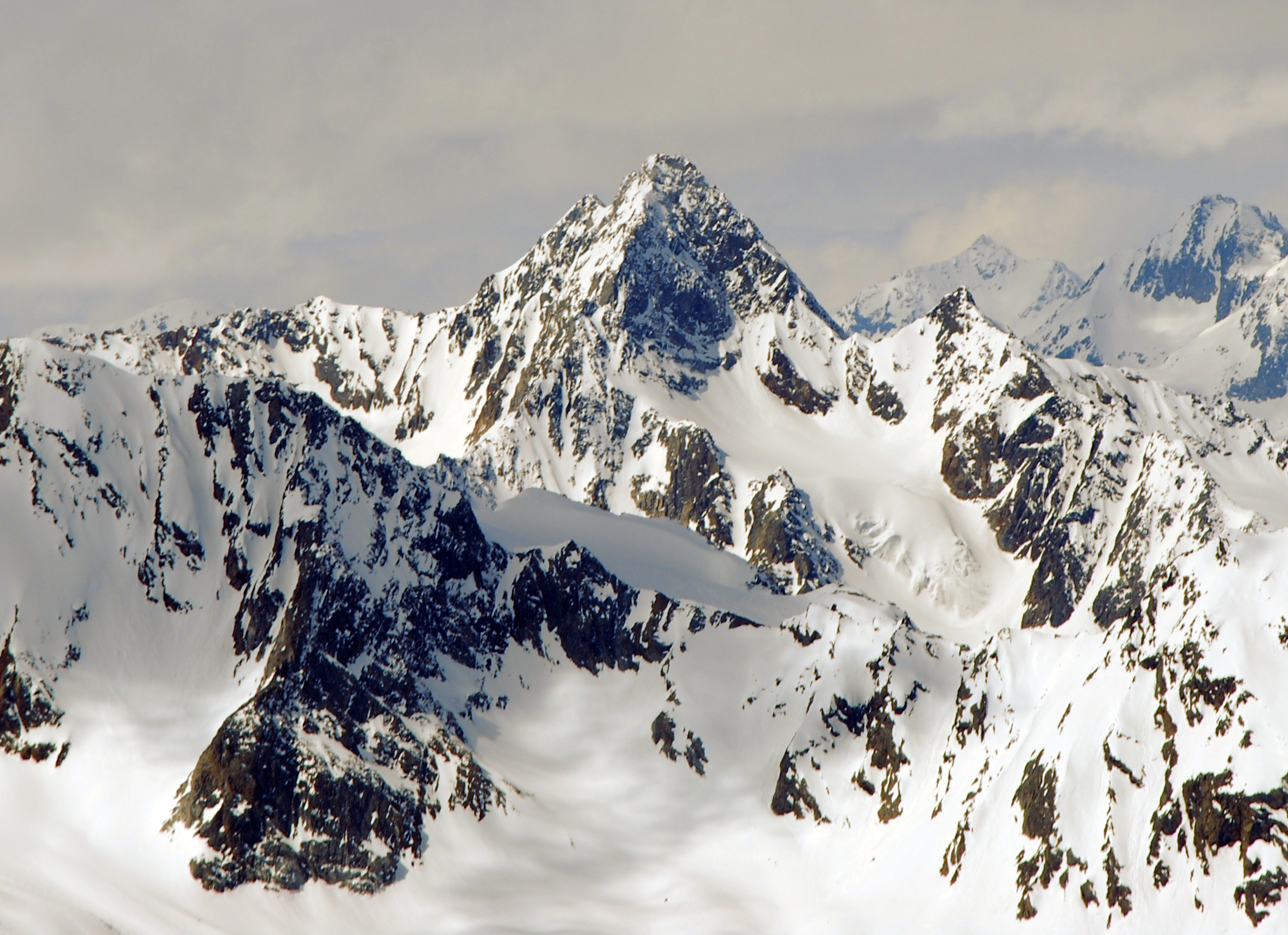
Winter view
