= Pirchkogel =

Mountain in Austria

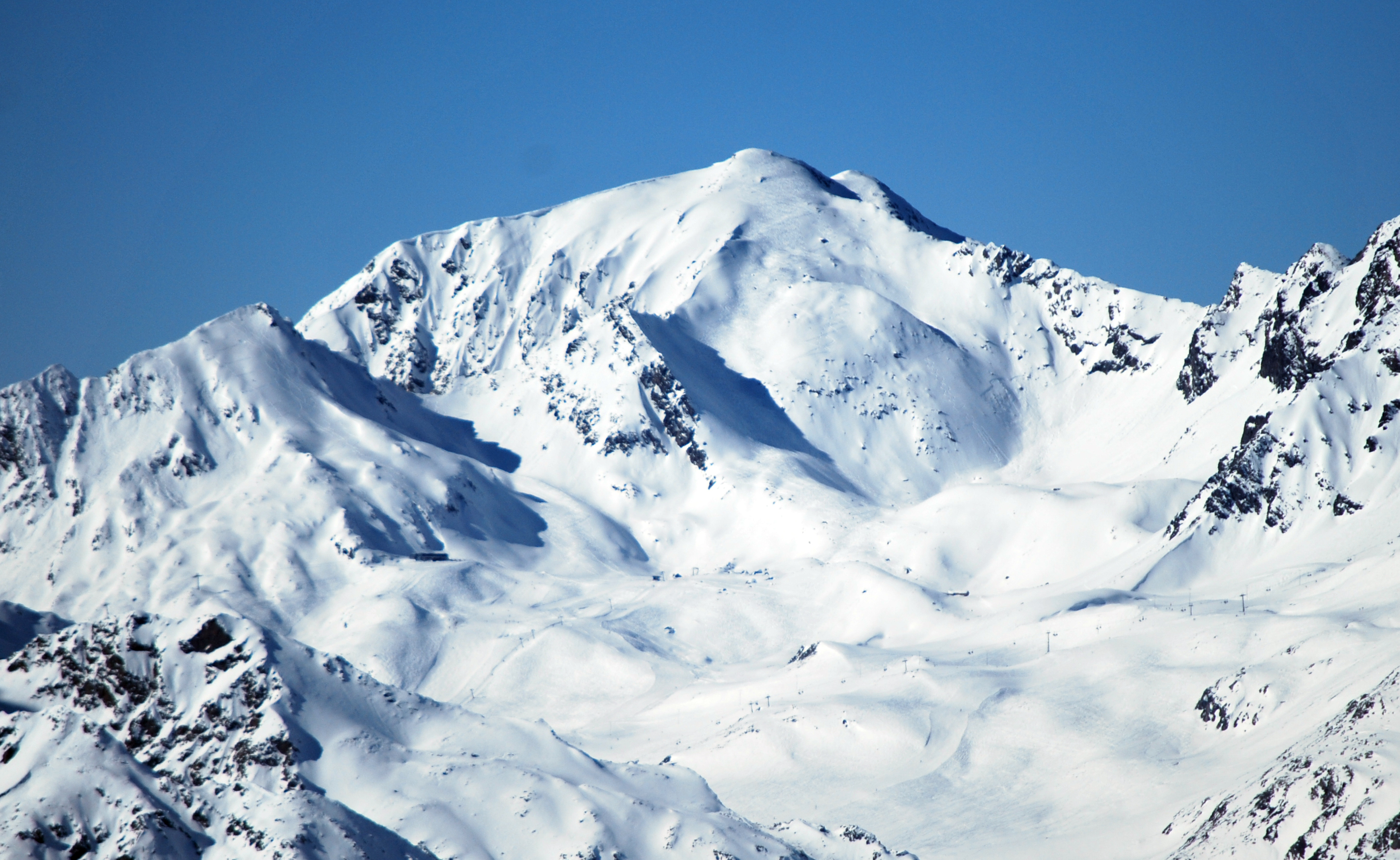
- The Pirchkogel from the southeast

Highest point
- Elevation: 2,828 m (AA) (9,278 ft)
- Prominence: 303 m ↓ Col with the Mitterzeigerkopf
- Isolation: 4.7 km → Zwölferkogel
- Coordinates: 47°13′55″N 10°59′56″E

Geography
- Location within Austria
- Location: Tyrol, Austria
- Parent range: Stubai Alps

Climbing
- Normal route: Waymarked path from Kühtai

The Pirchkogel (or also Pirchkogl) is a mountain, 2,828 m, in the Stubai Alps in Tyrol. It is a good viewing mountain.

== Geography ==
The Pirchkogel rises north of Kühtai (2,017 m) and the Dortmunder Hut (1,948 m) immediately above the road over the Kühtai Saddle. Together with the rock faces of the Irzwänden (2,757 m) to the east and the twin peaks of the Grießkogel (Vorderer 2,666 m and Hinterer Grießkogel 2,673 m), its arêtes surround a plateau known as the Schwarzmoos ("Black Moss").

== Biology ==
Here there are four little mountain lakes, including the Gossenköllesee at 2,413 m, up to which the ski region of Kühtai extends from the valley. Until 2014, the smallest Austrian UNESCO biosphere reserve (85 ha) was established in the area around the lakes where long term research into water ecology was carried out by the University of Innsbruck. Due to its small size and the fact that the authorities did not divide it into the core, buffer and development zones this region, one of the first biosphere reserves in Austria in 1977, did not fulfil the new criteria and the Austrian UNESCO Commission revoked its status. water monitoring and research, which had begun as early as 1933, continue however at the shoreside research station on the 9-metre-deep Gossenköllesee. Research is conducted into the changing growing conditions of the high alpine landscape as a consequence of the climatic changes of the last 800 years. The sediment tests also reflect the high eutrophication arising from intensive grazing of sheep and cattle near the lake beginning in the Middle Ages from 1670 (Schwaighof), the changing minerals on the lakebed indicate the stocking of trout (Salmo trutta morpho fario) since that time too.

== Ascent ==
Several paths lead to the summit of the Pirchkogel: the path via the northwest ridge, also called the Schafjoch, can be reached from Silz via the Silzer Alm or from the Ochsengarten. From Stams a mountain path runs up the Schneetal valley northeast of the summit. The most popular and shortest route is the southeast path from Kühtai. All these routes are also popular ski tours in winter.

There is no summit cross on the Pirchkogel, only a signal post. The cross is a little lower down at Marlstein, where it may be seen from the west and north.

== Literature ==
- Walter Klier (1980), Alpine Club guide Stubaier Alpen (in German), Munich: Bergverlag Rother, ISBN 3-7633-1212-9
