= Sonklarspitze =

Mountain in Italy

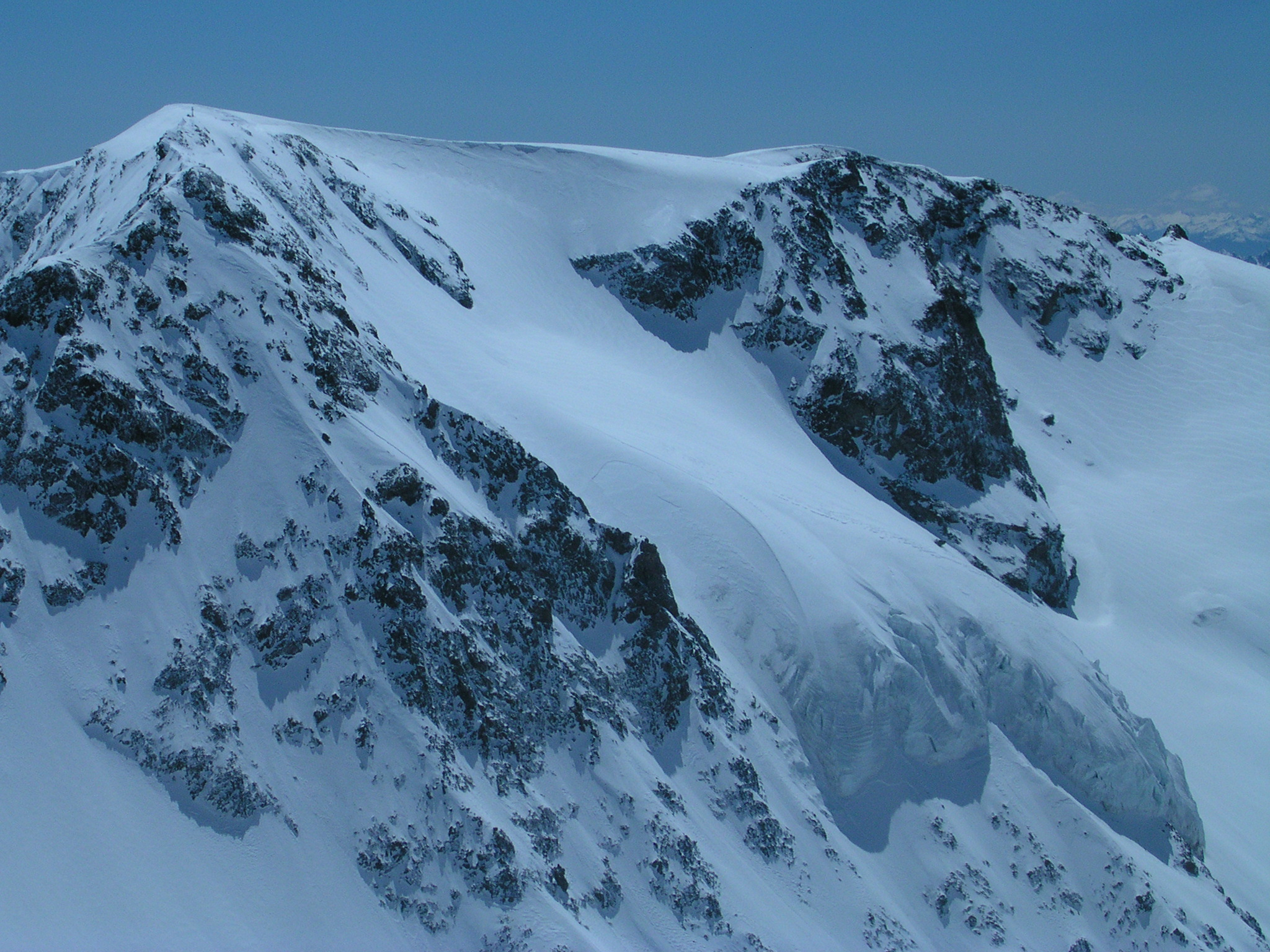

Highest point
- Elevation: 3,444 m (11,299 ft)
- Prominence: 146
- Parent peak: Zuckerhütl
- Coordinates: 46°57′22″N 11°09′52″E

Geography
- Location: Tyrol, Austria / South Tyrol, Italy
- Parent range: Stubai Alps

Climbing
- First ascent: 5 August 1869 by Richard Gutberlet, Alois Tanzer and S. Holzmann

The Sonklarspitze, also Sonklarspitz, is a mountain in the Stubai Alps on the border between Tyrol, Austria, and South Tyrol, Italy.
