= Cagle =

Cagle is an American surname resulting from the Anglicization of the German surname Kegel. Notable people with the surname include:

- A. M. Cagle (1884–1968), American composer
- Brett Cagle (born 1962), American religious leader
- Casey Cagle (born 1966), American politician
- Chris Cagle (born 1968), American country music singer
- Chris Cagle (American football) (1905–1942), American football player
- Daryl Cagle (born 1956), American cartoonist
- Harold Cagle (1913–1977), American athlete
- Mary Cagle (born 1989), American webcomic artist
- Myrtle Cagle (1925–2019), American pilot and part of Mercury 13
- Sandy Cagle (born 1957), American model
- Susan Justice (née Susan Cagle, born 1981), American pop-rock singer
- Susie Cagle, American journalist/cartoonist, daughter of Daryl
- Valerie Cagle (born 2002), American softball player
- Will Cagle (1938–2025), American racing driver
- Yvonne Cagle (born 1959), American astronaut

== See also ==
- Cagle's map turtle, a species of turtle
- Chris Cagle, Chris Cagle's self-titled album
