= Tribulaun =

Mountain in Italy

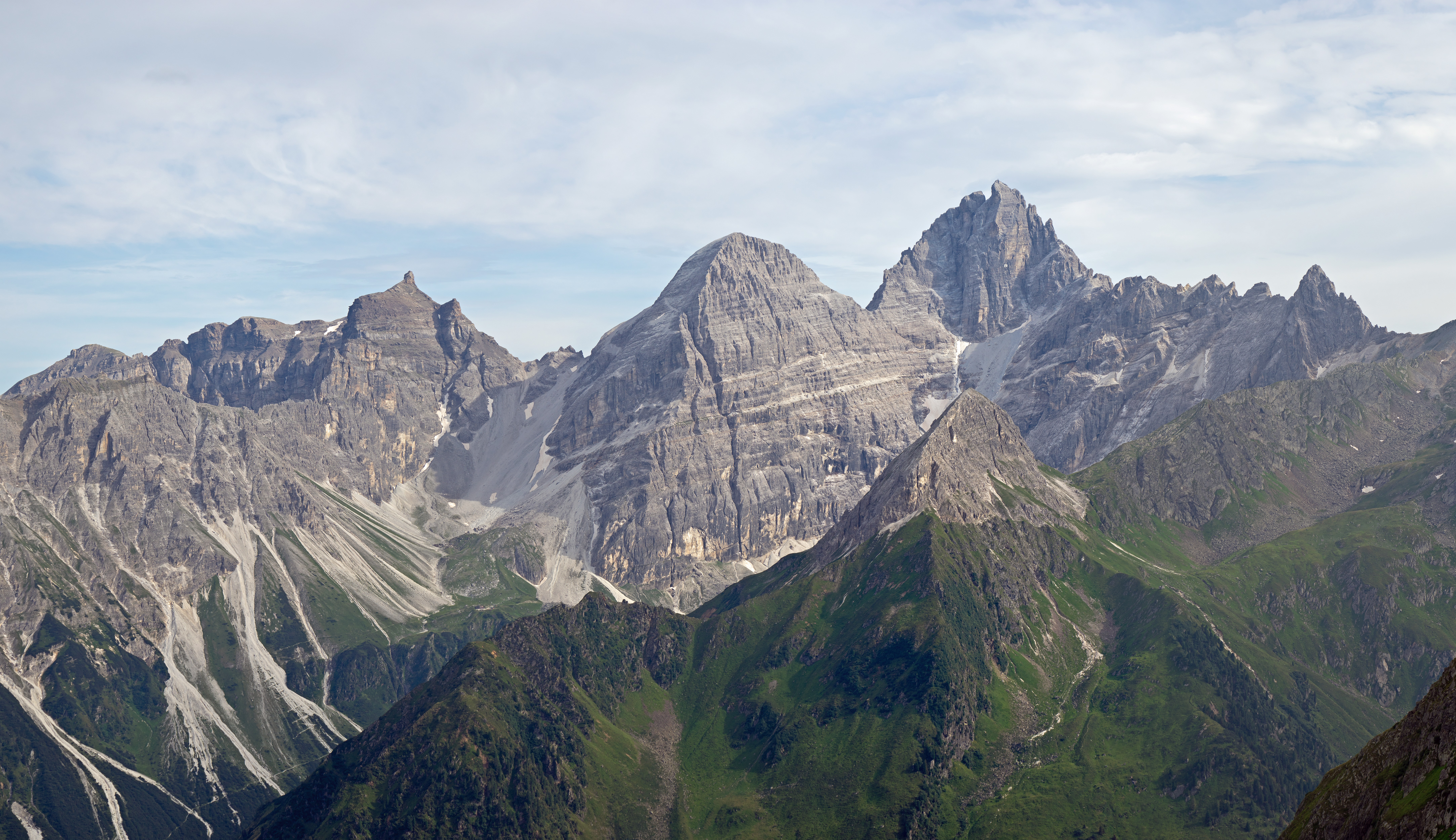
- The Tribulauns seen from the north

Highest point
- Elevation: 3,097 m (10,161 ft)
- Prominence: 498
- Listing: Alpine mountains above 3000 m
- Coordinates: 46°59′0″N 11°20′0″E

Geography
- Location within Alps
- Location: Tyrol, Austria / South Tyrol, Italy
- Parent range: Stubai Alps

Climbing
- First ascent: 1874 by G. Hofmann, N. Winhart, Johann Grill and G. Pittracher

The Tribulauns are three peaks of the Stubai Alps on the border between Tyrol, Austria, and South Tyrol, Italy.
