= Fleckner =

Mountain in Italy

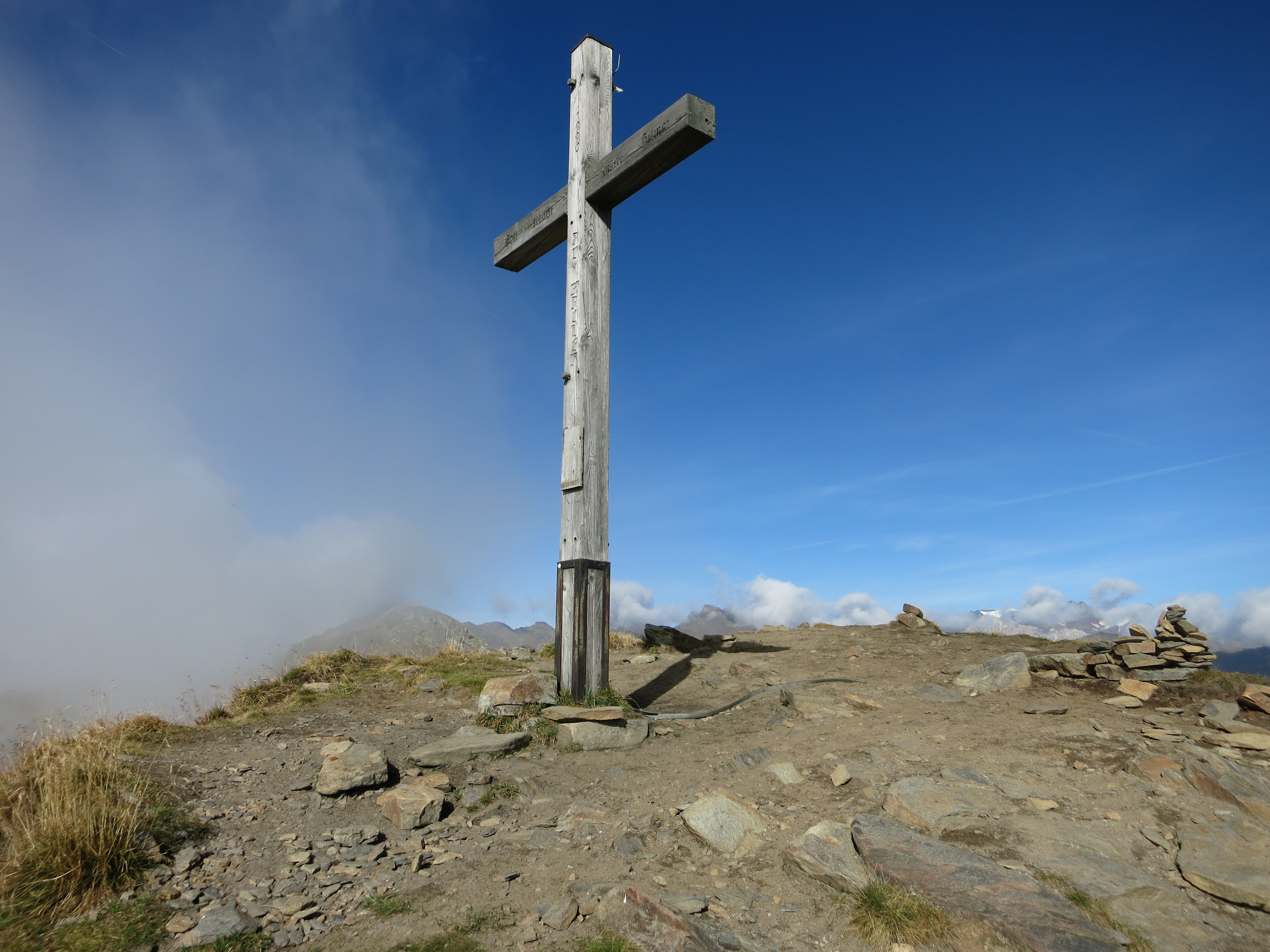
- Summit cross, Fleckner, South Tyrol, Italy

Highest point
- Elevation: 2,331 m (7,648 ft)
- Coordinates: 46°50′28″N 11°16′11″E

Geography
- Location: South Tyrol, Italy
- Parent range: Stubai Alps

The Fleckner or Flecknerspitze is a peak of the Stubai Alps mountain range in South Tyrol, Italy. The peak has an elevation of 2331 m and on its top there is a large summit cross, which surrounded by green meadow during summer. There is hiking trail leading directly over the top and the mountain is a destination for ski tours during the winter as well.
