= Roter Kogel =

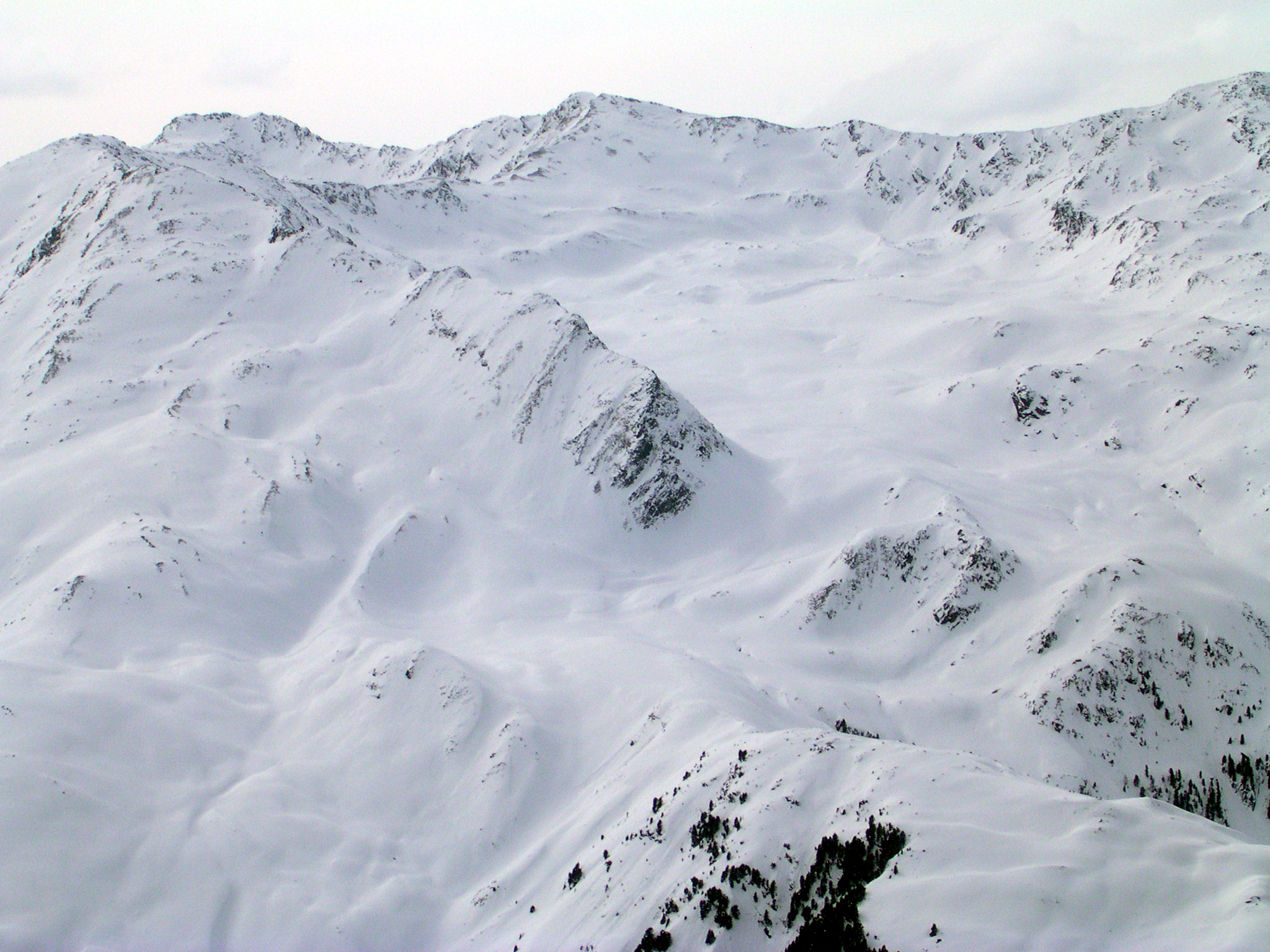

Highest point
- Elevation: 2,832 m (9,291 ft)
- Coordinates: 47°08′00″N 11°10′0″E

Geography
- Location: Tyrol, Austria
- Parent range: Stubai Alps

The Roter Kogel is a mountain, 2,832 m (AA), in the Stubai Alps in the Austrian state of Tyrol.

It lies on a ridge that runs from the Hohe Villerspitze over the Lüsener Villerspitze (3,027 m (AA)) northwards as far as the Fotscher Windegg (2,577 m (AA)). West of this chain lies the Lüsener Valley and the village of Praxmar, a starting point for an ascent of the Roter Kogel. East of the Roter Kogels stretches the valley of Fotscher Tal, where there are two other bases: the Alpengasthof Bergheim Fotsch (1,464 m (AA)) and the Potsdamer Hut. This ascent up the eastern side is also a popular ski tour in winter.

== Literature ==
- Heinrich und Walter Klier, Alpenvereinsführer Stubaier Alpen, Bergverlag Rudolf Rother, München 1988. ISBN 3-7633-1252-8
