= Wilder Freiger =

Mountain between Austria and Italy

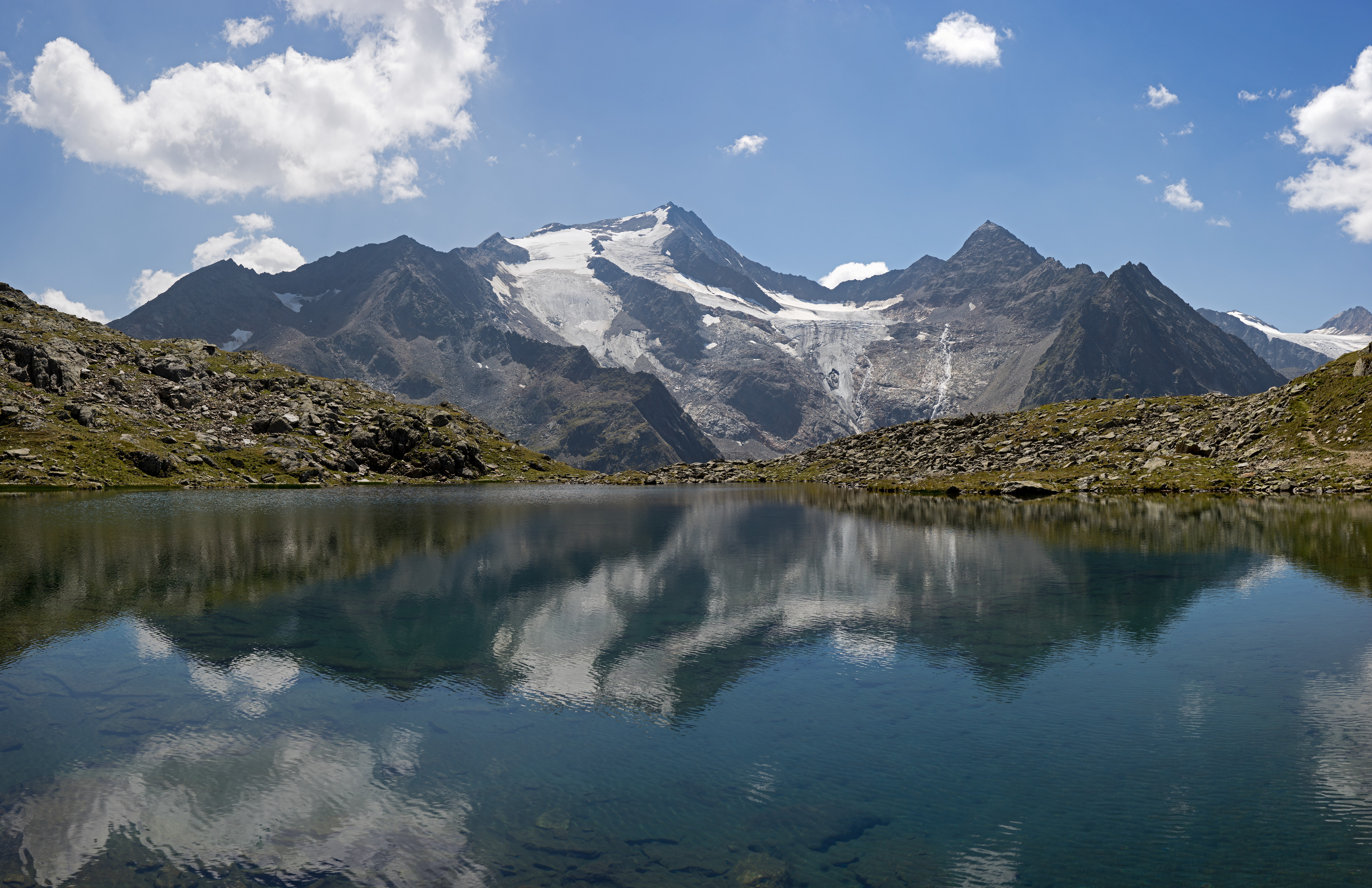
- View of the Wilder Freiger over the Upper Grünausee

Highest point
- Elevation: 3,418 m (11,214 ft)
- Coordinates: 46°58′14″N 11°11′23″E

Geography
- Location: Tyrol, Austria / South Tyrol, Italy
- Parent range: Stubai Alps

Climbing
- First ascent: 1865

The Wilder Freiger (Italian: Cima Libera) is a mountain in the Stubai Alps on the border between Tyrol, Austria, and South Tyrol, Italy.
