= Botzer =

Mountain in Italy

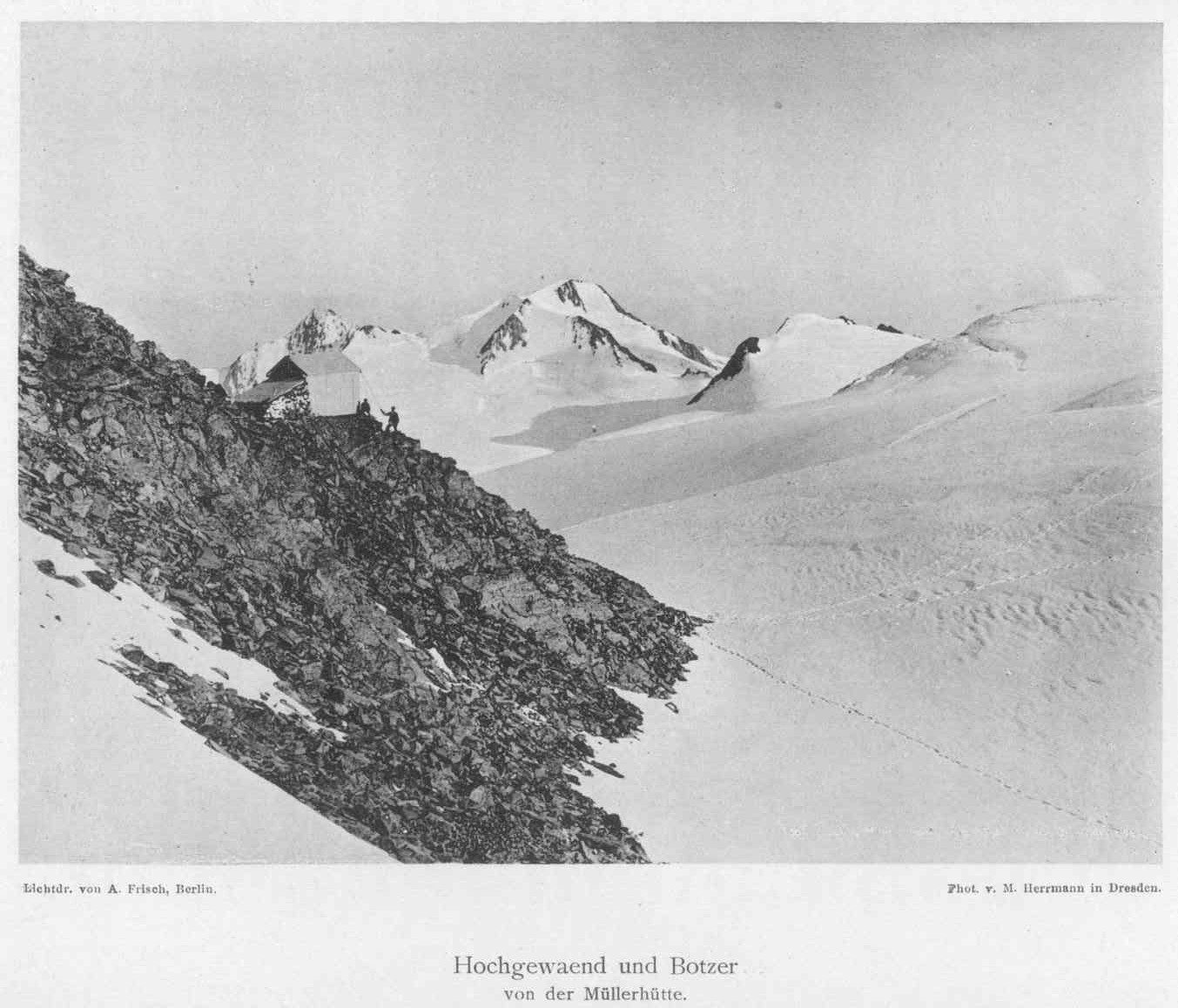

Highest point
- Elevation: 3,250 m (10,660 ft)
- Coordinates: 46°55′51″N 11°11′53″E

Geography
- Location: South Tyrol, Italy
- Parent range: Stubai Alps

Climbing
- First ascent: 16 Juli 1874 by Theodor Petersen, Alois Ennemoser

The Botzer is a mountain in the Stubai Alps in South Tyrol, Italy.
