= Agglsspitze =

Mountain in Italy

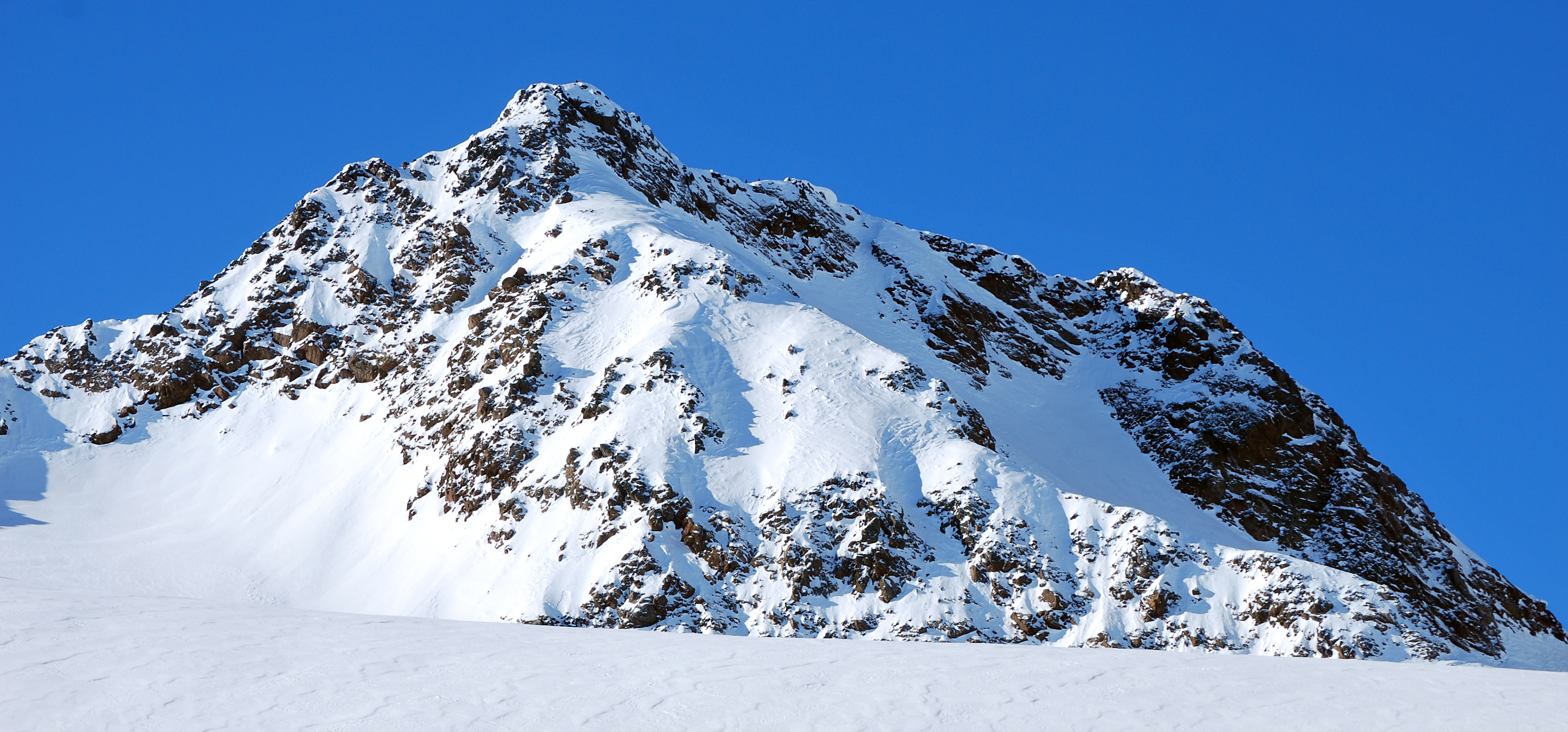

Highest point
- Elevation: 3,196 m (10,486 ft)
- Coordinates: 46°57′57″N 11°14′40″E

Geography
- Location: South Tyrol, Italy
- Parent range: Stubai Alps

Climbing
- First ascent: 17 August 1887 by Carl Hofer, Albert Wachtler, Demeter Diamantidi, Peter Kotter

The Agglsspitze (Italian: Cima dell'Accla; German: Agglsspitze) is a mountain in South Tyrol, Italy.
