= Koegel =

Koegel may refer to:

== People ==
- Arthur Koegel (born 1889–?), American politician in the Wisconsin State Assembly
- Debbie Koegel (born 1977), American ice dancer
- Erin Koegel (born 1982), American politician in the Minnesota House of Representatives
- Karl Kögel (1917–1945), German ice hockey player
- Max Koegel (1895–1946), German Nazi SS concentration camp commandant
- Pete Koegel (1947–2023), American baseball player
- Robert Koegel, American psychologist
- Tim Koegel (born 1958), American football quarterback
- Warren Koegel (born 1949), American football player and college athletics administrator

== Companies ==
- Koegel Meat Company, headquartered in Flint Township, Michigan, United States
- Kögel Trailer, a vehicle manufacturer in Germany

== See also ==
- Kegel (disambiguation)
- Kogel (disambiguation)
