= Weißwandspitze =

Mountain in Italy

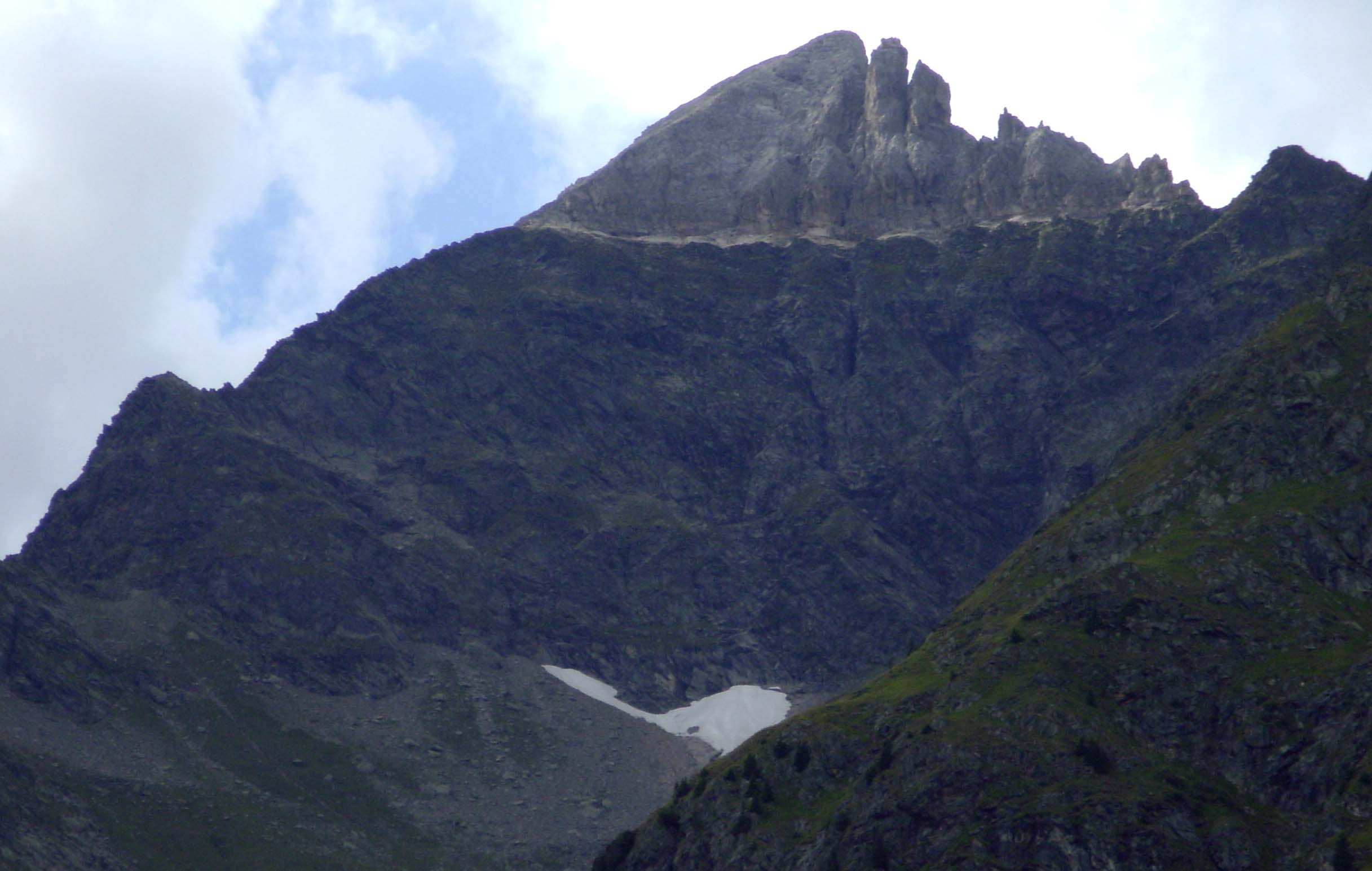

Highest point
- Elevation: 3,017 m (9,898 ft)
- Coordinates: 46°59′01″N 11°18′01″E

Geography
- Location: Tyrol, Austria / South Tyrol, Italy
- Parent range: Stubai Alps

Climbing
- First ascent: 1882 by J. Proch

The Weißwandspitze (Italian: Parete Bianca; German: Weißwandspitze) is a mountain in the Stubai Alps on the border between Tyrol, Austria, and South Tyrol, Italy.
