= Zischgeles =

Mountain in Austria

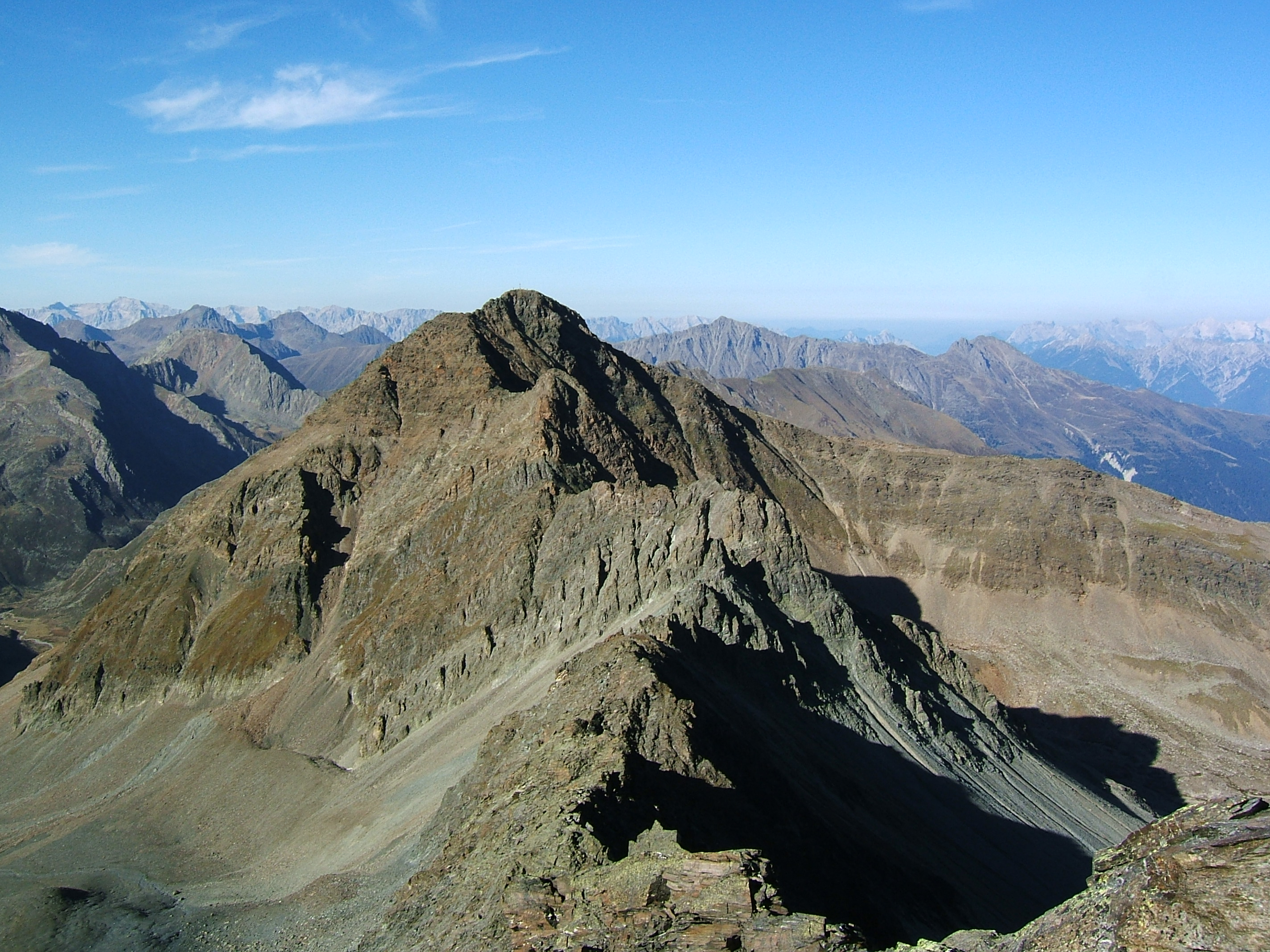
- Zischgeles from the south Schöntalspitze

Highest point
- Elevation: 3,004 m (9,856 ft)
- Prominence: 135 m (443 ft)
- Parent peak: Grubenwand
- Isolation: 1.69 km (1.05 mi)
- Coordinates: 47°07′55″N 11°05′42″E

Geography
- Location within Austria
- Location: Tyrol, Austria
- Parent range: Stubai Alps

Climbing
- Easiest route: rock/snow climb

Zischgeles is a summit in the Stubai Alps in the Austrian state of Tyrol.

== Climbing ==
The normal route starts from Praxmar and is an alpine mountain hike without glacier travel. Only the last part of the track close to the summit might require the use of hands. The Zischgeles is considered an easy three-thousander.

Ski tours are common at the Zischgeles in wintertime.
