= Blaue Lacke =

Lake in the Stubai Alps in Tyrol, Austria

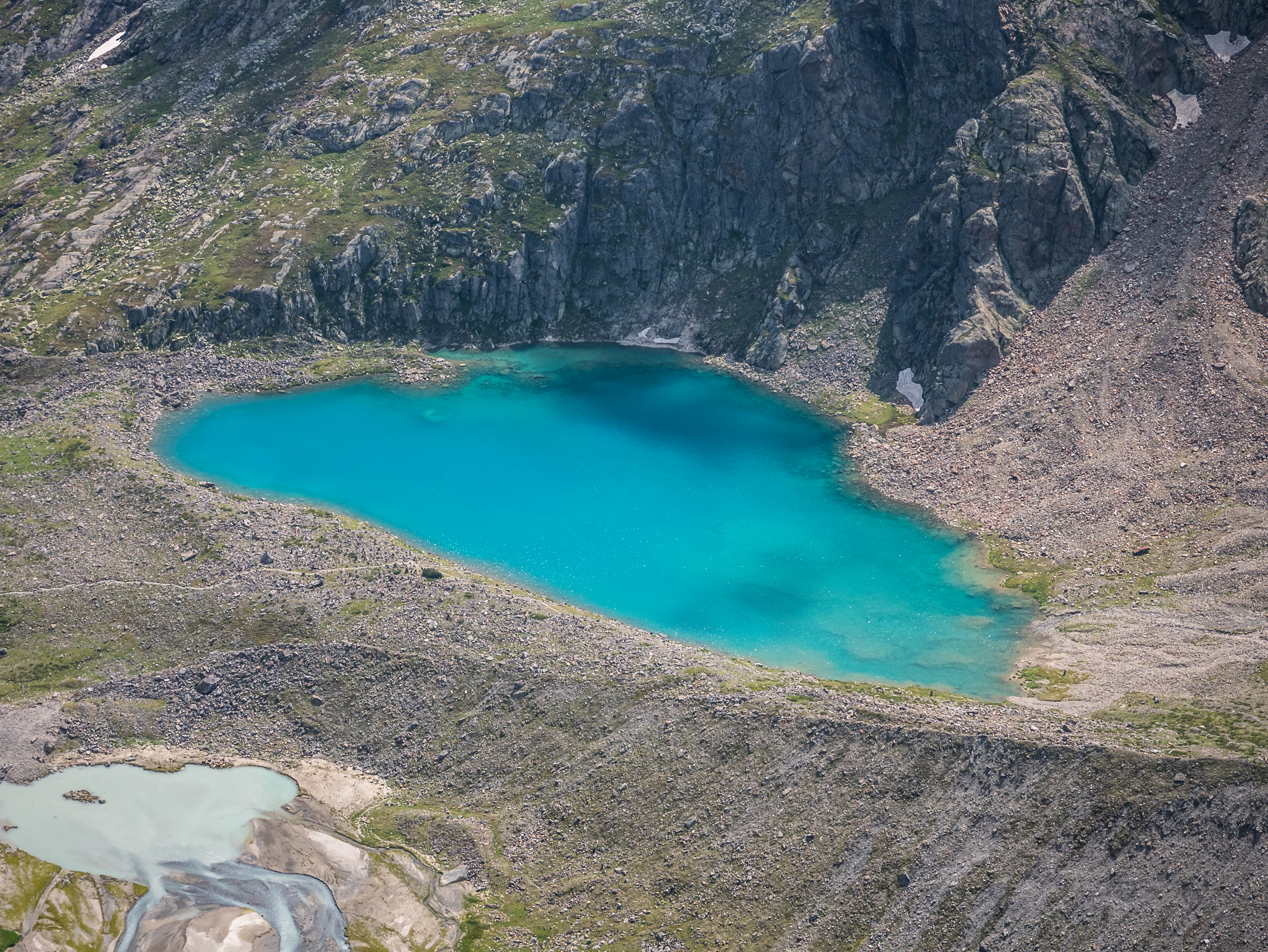

- Location within Tyrol, Austria
- Location: Tyrol, Austria
- Coordinates: 46.9915°N 11.1762°E

Blaue Lacke (German for "the Blue Puddle") is a lake in the Stubai Alps in Tyrol, Austria.
