= Kegel =

Kegel may refer to:

== Uses ==
- Kegel exercise, a pelvic floor exercise
- Kegel, a traditional German version of nine-pin bowling

== People with the surname ==
- Arnold Kegel (1894–1972), American gynecologist
- Charles Kegel (1924–1981), interim President of Idaho State University, US
- Friedrich Wilhelm Kegel (?–1948), Namibian mine director
- Herbert Kegel (1920–1990), German conductor
- Johann Karl Ehrenfried Kegel (1784–1863), German agronomist and explorer of the Kamchatka Peninsula
- Otto H. Kegel (1934–2025), German mathematician

== See also ==
- Heike Wilms-Kegel (born 1952), German politician
- Koegel (disambiguation)
- Kogel (disambiguation)
