= Kogel Bearings =

American bicycle component manufacturer

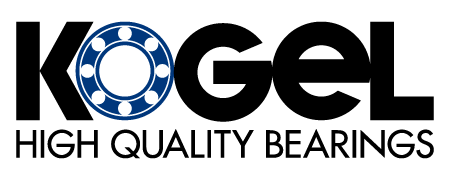
- Company type: Private
- Industry: Bicycles
- Founded: 2014
- Headquarters: El Paso, TX, USA
- Key people: Ard Kessels, President
- Products: Bicycle components
- Website: kogel.cc

Kogel Bearings is a manufacturer in the bicycle industry. Headquartered in El Paso, Texas, Kogel Bearings are marketed and sold online and through a network of bicycle dealers across North America, in Europe and Asia.

The company specializes in high quality ball bearings. Kogel Bearings began selling products in January 2014 and the product line was first featured in an online article on August 3 of the same year. Kogel Bearings offers branded products along with OEM and co-branded products to third-party companies.

== History ==
Kogel Bearings was founded by Ard Kessels, a Dutch native who sold his bicycle shop in Antwerp, Belgium before moving to the United States to follow his wife’s career. After being frustrated with the bearing qualities offered on premium bicycles, he felt that there was a need for a better ball bearing. The first offering was a line of ceramic bottom brackets available for upgrading or replacing a worn bottom bracket. A complete line of rear derailleur pulleys and wheel bearings were added over time.

== Products ==
The key products offered by Kogel Bearings are hybrid ceramic bearings with specific seals for road and off-road use. Off-road seals are designed for cyclocross and mountain bike configurations. With these bearings, the company produces a line of bottom brackets, derailleur pulleys and wheel bearing sets.

Product development relies heavily on Kogel’s collaboration with their professional athletes, who will put products to the test in a way that cannot be replicated in a laboratory.

== Professional rider sponsorship ==
The UnitedHealthcare Pro Cycling (men's team) has been using Kogel Bearings since the brand’s first year on the market. Other athletes and teams consist of Helen Wyman and the Maxxis Shimano team in cyclocross, Amanda Nauman in gravel racing and Johannes Moldan in triathlon.
