= Habicht =

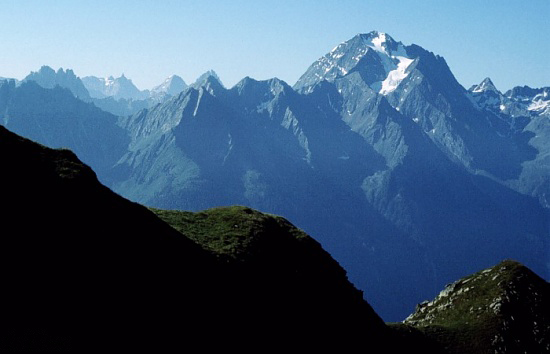

Highest point
- Elevation: 3,277 m (10,751 ft)
- Prominence: 557 m (1,827 ft)
- Listing: Alpine mountains above 3000 m
- Coordinates: 47°2′38″N 11°17′23″E

Geography
- Location: Tyrol, Austria
- Parent range: Stubai Alps
- Topo map: BEV ÖK50 147

Climbing
- First ascent: 1836 by Thurwieser and Krösbacher
- Easiest route: Scramble

The Habicht is a mountain in the Stubai Alps of Austria. For a long time, the locals believed it to be the highest mountain in Tyrol, due to its prominence above the surrounding mountains. Despite what they thought, the highest peak in the Stubai Alps is Zuckerhütl which is 230 metres higher than Habicht. The name literally means "hawk" in German.

== Climbing ==
- Starting point: Innsbrucker Hütte (2369 m)
- Height gain: 908 m
- Difficulty level: non-trivial; portions secured by cables (which may be buried in snowy conditions), part of the route from 3100-3200m leads over snow-field
- Duration: 3 hours ascent, plus or minus depending on weather and experience
