= Stubaier Wildspitze =

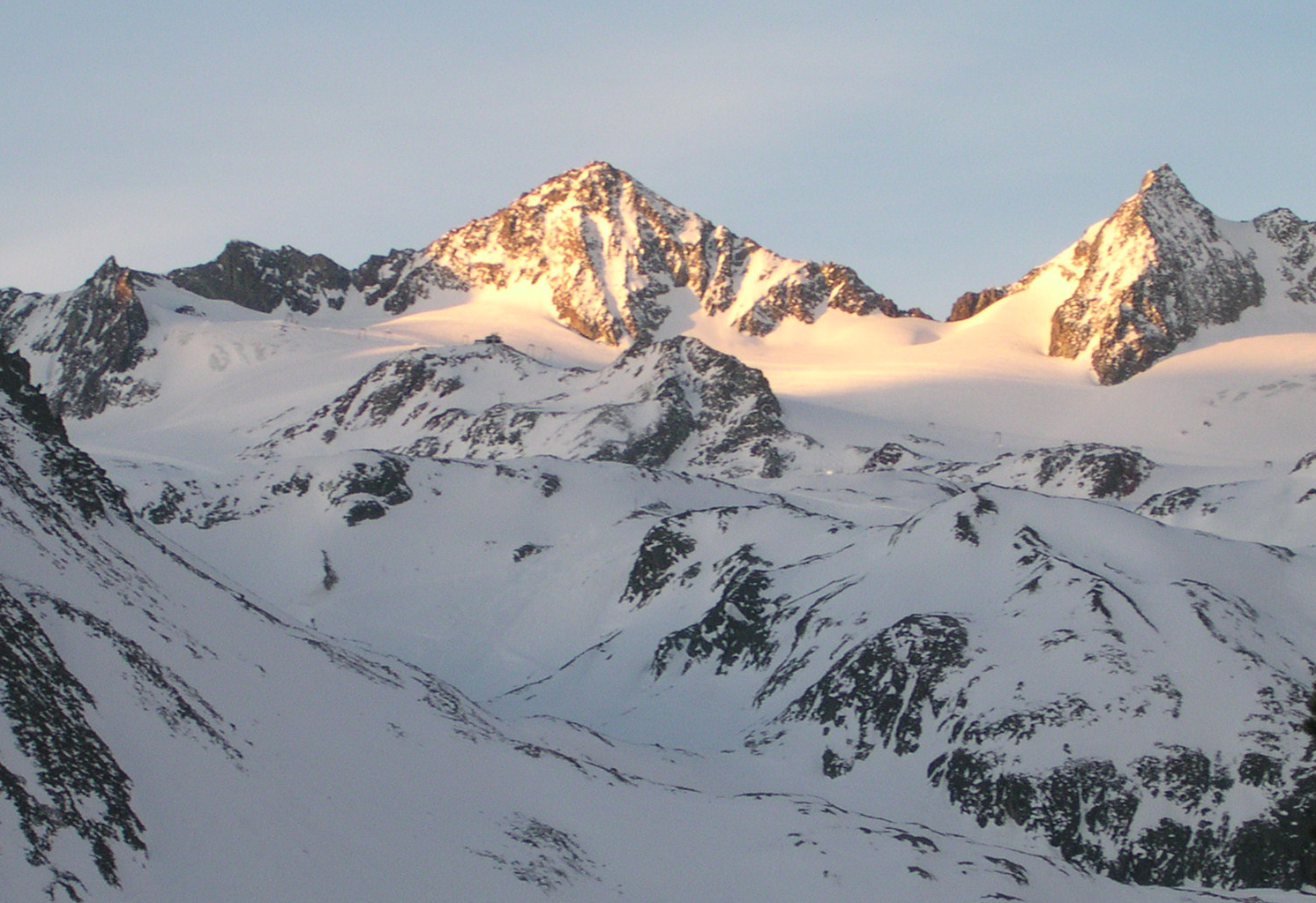
- View from the northeast. Centre: the Stubaier Wildspitze; right: the Östliche Daunkogel

Highest point
- Elevation: 3,341 m (AA) (10,961 ft)
- Prominence: 168 m
- Isolation: 1.46 km→ Windacher Daunkogel
- Coordinates: 46°59′00″N 11°06′00″E

Geography
- Location within Austria
- Location: Tyrol, Austria
- Parent range: Stubai Alps

Climbing
- First ascent: 1882 by E. v. Fuchs, M. Egger and Josef Pfurtscheller.
- Normal route: from the Stubaier Eisjoch in the south over blockwork (blockwerk)

The Stubaier Wildspitze is a 3,341-metre-high mountain in the Stubai Alps in the Austrian state of Tyrol. Northeast of the summit lie two glaciers, the Schaufelferner and the Daunkogelferner, which form the basis for the Stubai Glacier ski region.

The first documented ascent by tourists was in 1882 by E. v. Fuchs, M. Egger and Josef Pfurtscheller.

== Bibliography ==
- Petersen, Theodor (1889). "Die Stubaier Wildspitze" in Mittheilungen des Deutschen und Oesterreichischsen Alpenvereins. No. 23, 15 December 1889. Vienna.
