= Feuerstein (Stubai Alps) =

Mountain in Italy

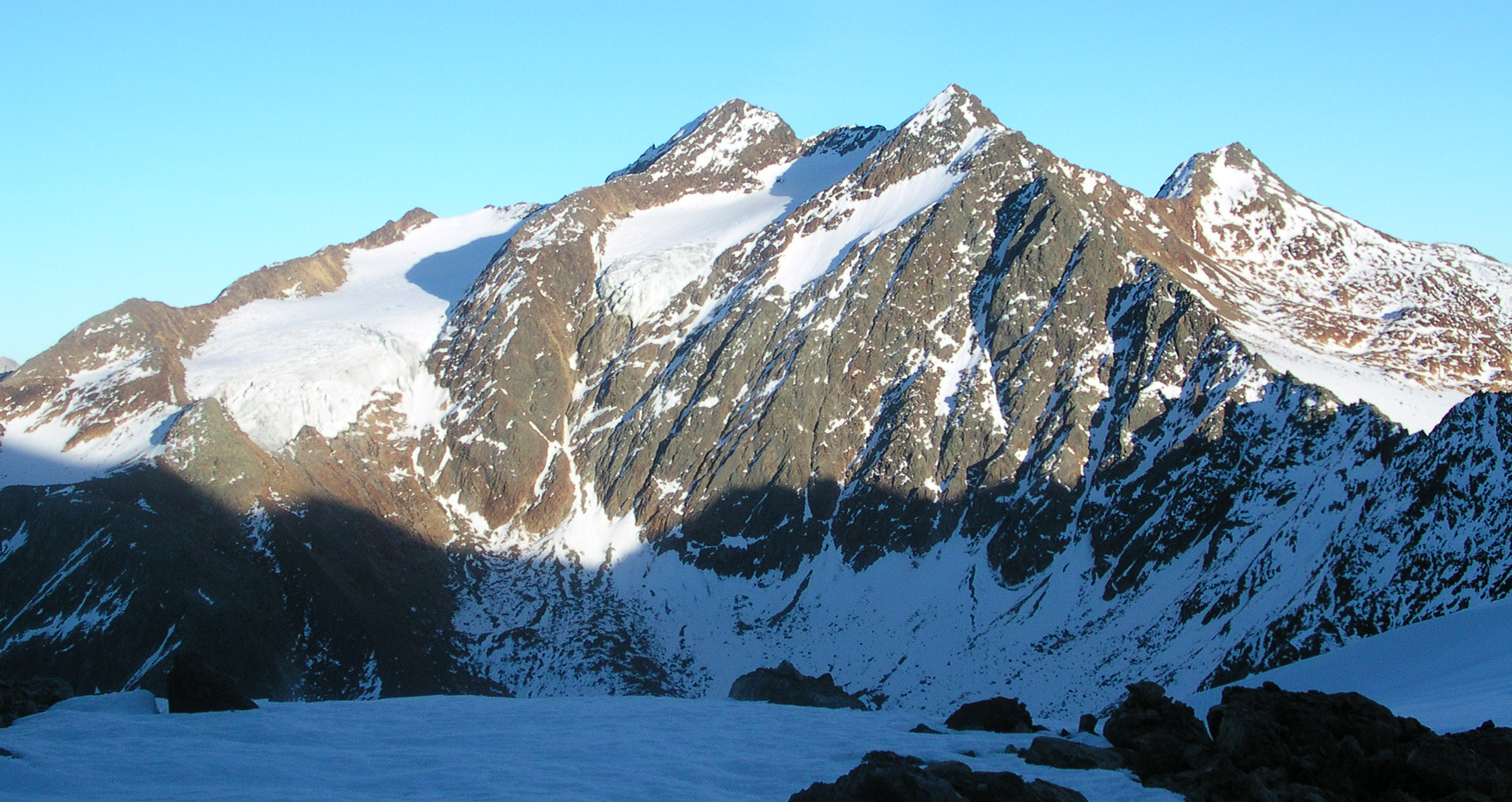

Highest point
- Elevation: 3,268 m (10,722 ft)
- Prominence: 441 m (1,447 ft)
- Listing: Alpine mountains above 3000 m
- Coordinates: 46°58′22″N 11°14′29″E

Geography
- Location: Tyrol, Austria / South Tyrol, Italy
- Parent range: Stubai Alps

Climbing
- First ascent: Around 1855, again 14 September 1869 by Julius Ficker, Pankraz Gleinser and Andreas Pfurtscheller

The Feuerstein is a twin peak in the Stubai Alps on the border of Tyrol and South Tyrol.
