= Kagel =

Kagel may refer to:

- Kagel, Iran, a village in Kurdistan Province, Iran
- Kagel, Missouri, a community in the United States
- Jeffrey Kagel (born 1947, Long Island, New York), U.S. vocalist
- Mauricio Kagel (1931–2008), a composer
