= Hohe Villerspitze =

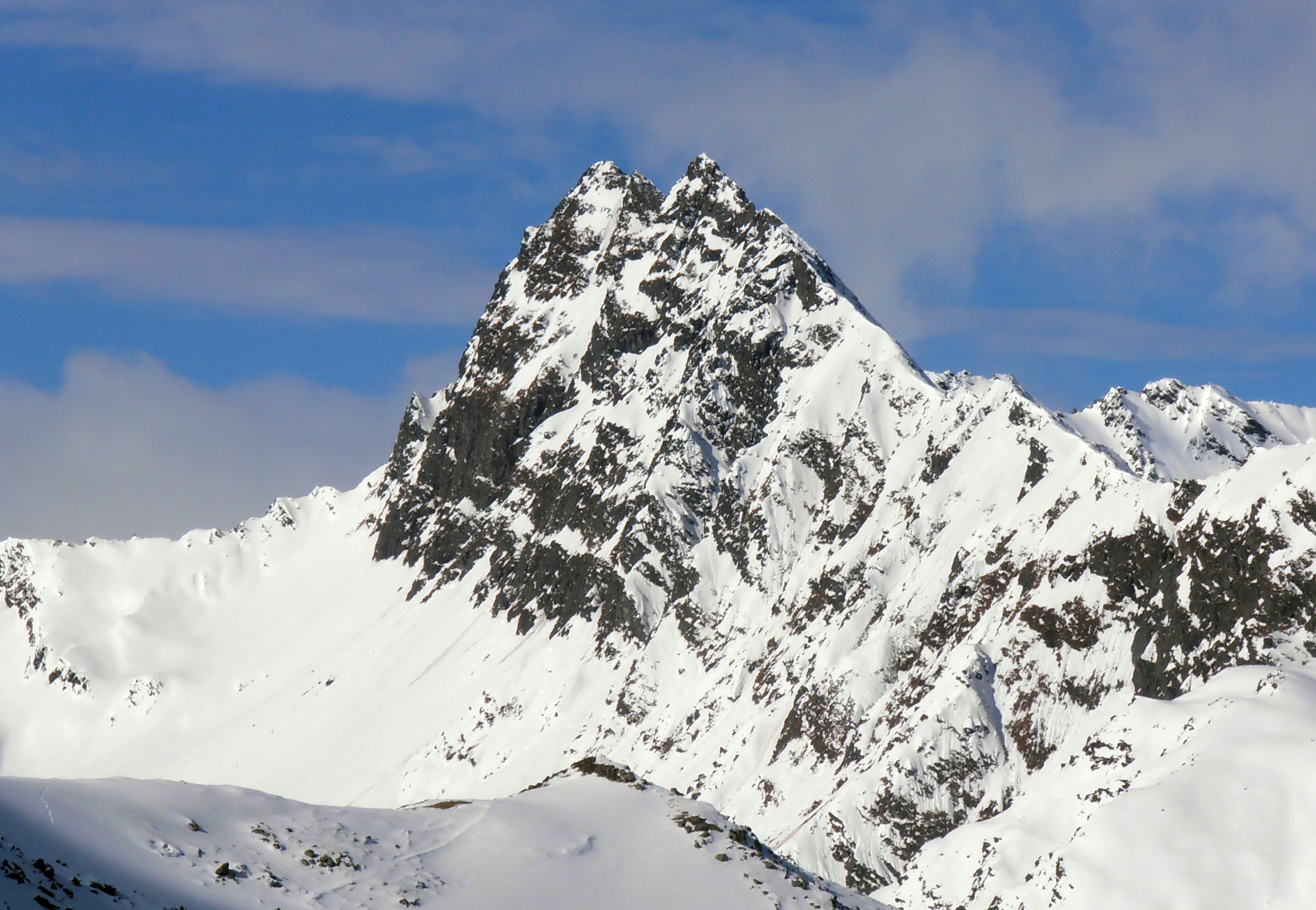
- The Hohe Villerspitze from the east

Highest point
- Elevation: 3,087 m (AA) (10,128 ft)
- Prominence: 293 m ↓ Kleines Horntaler Joch
- Isolation: 4.0 km → Berglasspitze
- Listing: Alpine mountains above 3000 m
- Coordinates: 47°06′29″N 11°10′24″E

Geography
- Location within Austria
- Location: Tyrol, Austria
- Parent range: Stubai Alps

Geology
- Rock type: amphibolite

Climbing
- First ascent: 20 July 1887 by Carl Gsaller
- Normal route: northwest arête (UIAA grade II)

The Hohe Villerspitze is a mountain, 3,087 m (AA), in the Southeastern Sellrain Mountains (Südöstlichen Sellrainer Bergen), a sub-group of the northern Stubai Alps in the Austrian state of Tyrol. The mountain has three tops that, together, form an isolated, massive and prominent rocky summit made of amphibolite. Due to its geographic dominance and easily accessibility the Villerspitze is a fairly frequently visited lookout mountain, but it is not one to be underestimated. The southwestern rock tower has a height of 3,087 m (AA), the middle one is 3,081 m (AA) and the northwestern top is 3,024 m (AA). A prominent arête runs south from the summit.

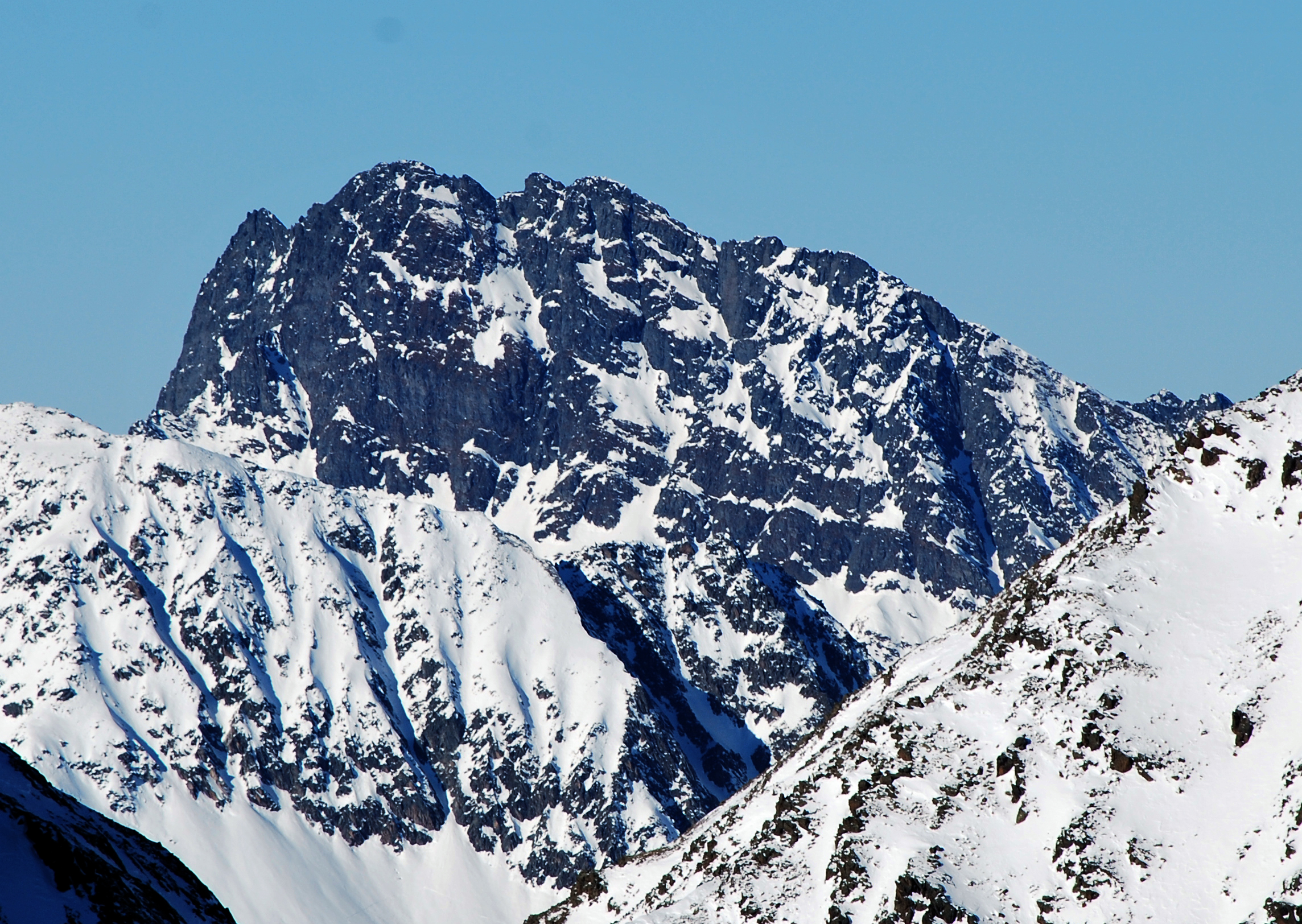
The Hohe Villerspitze from the south

== Literature and maps ==
- Walter Klier, Stubaier Alpen, Alpine Club Guide, Munich, 2006, ISBN 3-7633-1271-4
- Eduard Richter, Die Erschließung der Ostalpen, Vol II, Berlin, Verlag des Deutschen und Oesterreichischen Alpenvereins, 1894
- Alpine Club map 1:25,000 series, Sheet 31/2 Stubaier Alpen, Sellrain
