= Stubai Alps =

Mountain range in Central Europe

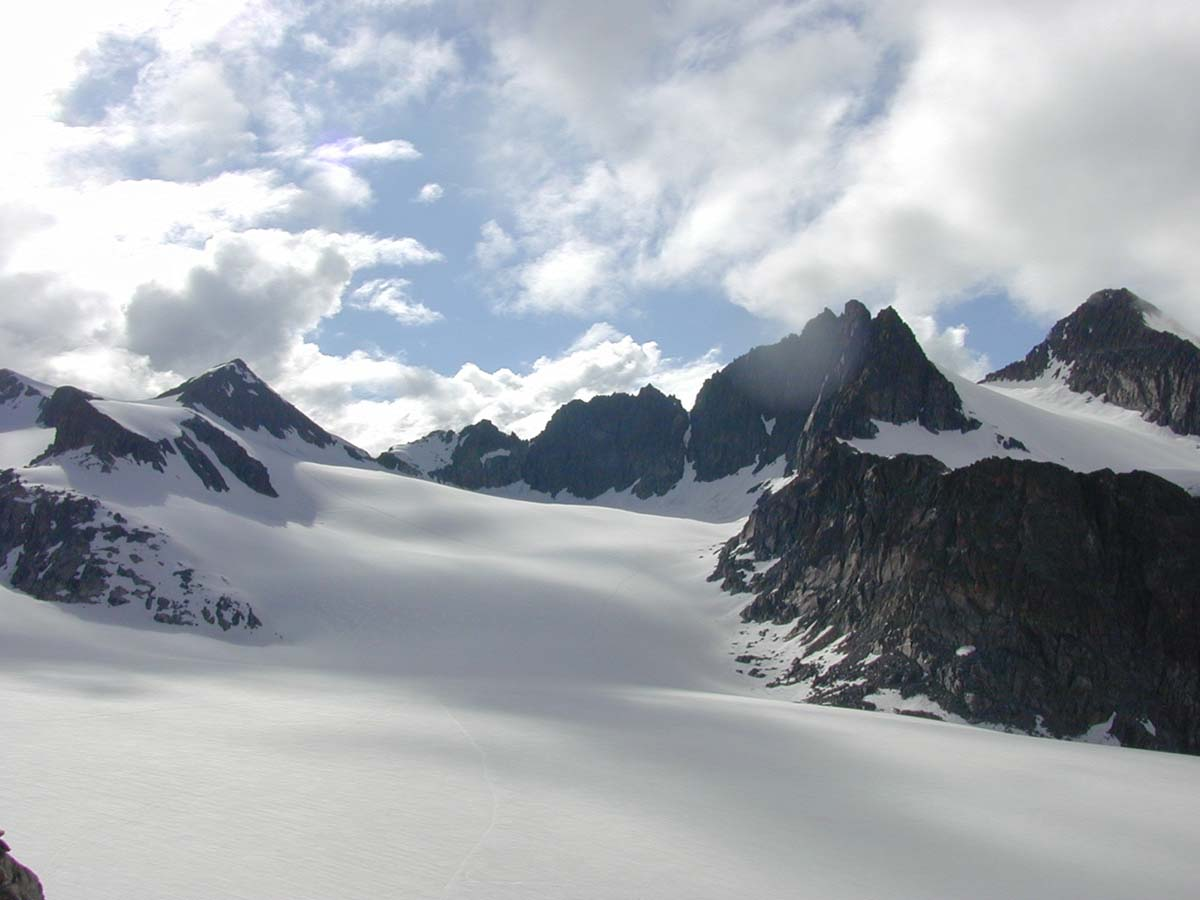
- Lisenser FernerKogel, Rotgratspitze and Lisenser Spitze in July

Highest point
- Peak: Zuckerhütl
- Elevation: 3,507 m (11,506 ft)
- Coordinates: 46°57′42″N 11°9′13″E

Geography
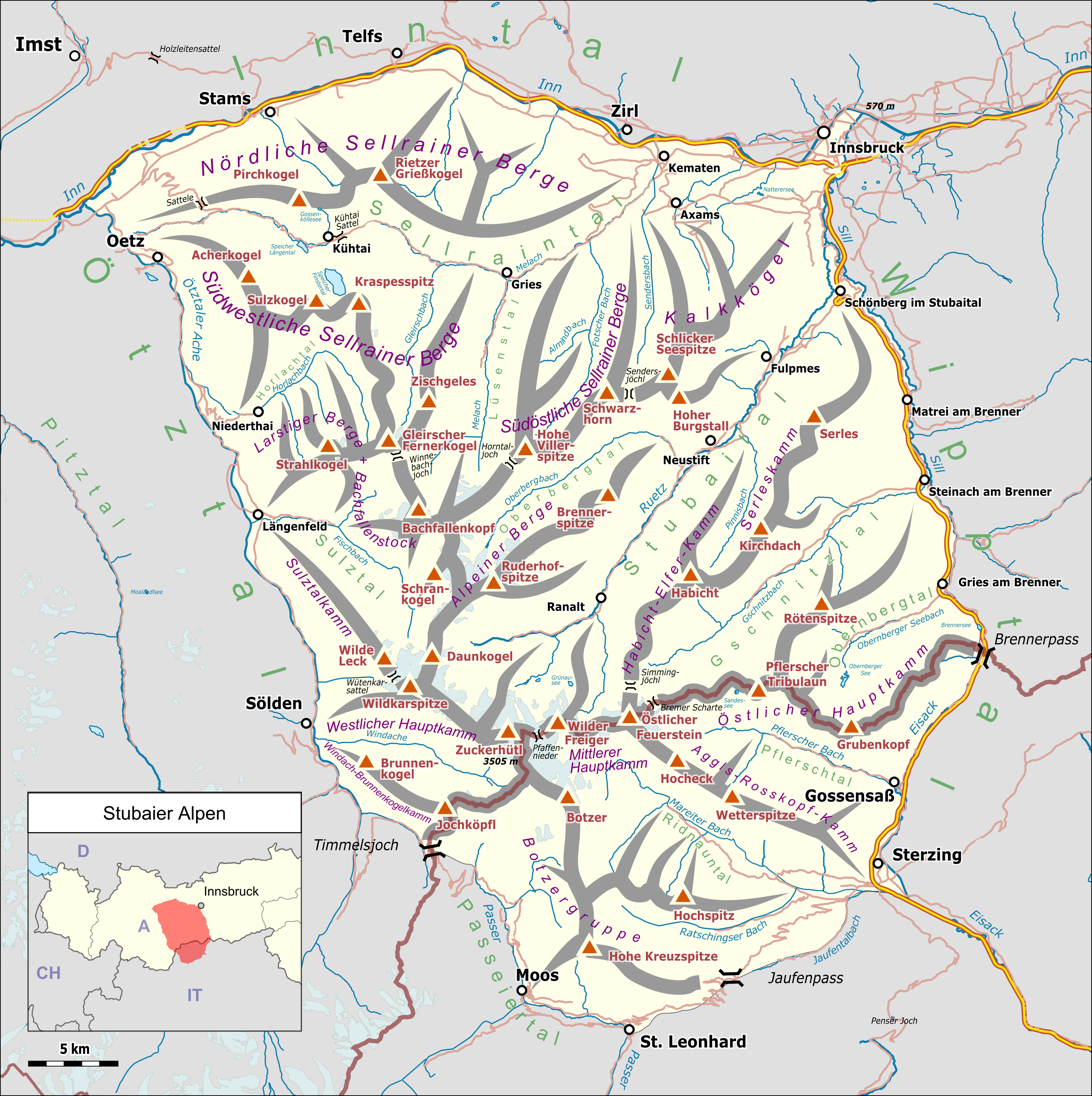
- Location of the Stubai Alps. The borders of the range according to Alpine Club classification of the Eastern Alps
- Countries: Austria; Italy
- States: Tyrol; South Tyrol
- Range coordinates: 47°05′N 11°10′E
- Parent range: Central Eastern Alps

The Stubai Alps (German: Stubaier Alpen, pronounced [ˈʃtuːbaɪɐ ˈalpn̩]) is a mountain range in the Central Eastern Alps of Europe. It derives its name from the Stubaital valley to its east and is located southwest of Innsbruck, Austria. Several peaks form the border between Austria and Italy. The range is bounded by the Inn River valley to the north; the Sill River valley (Wipptal) and the Brenner Pass to the east (separating it from the Zillertal Alps); the Ötztal and Timmelsjoch to the west (separating it from the Ötztal Alps), and to the south by tributaries of the Passer River and Eisack.

== Geography ==
Some parts of the Stubai Alps show signs of glaciation. The northern part around the Sellrain valley and the Kühtai is now only lightly glaciated and a popular ski touring destination (Zischgeles, Lampsenspitze, Pirchkogel, Sulzkogel). The High Stubai around the upper Stubai valley is still heavily glaciated and a classic high mountain touring region in the Eastern Alps. Here there is a glacier ski area on the Stubai Glacier.

Together with the Ötztal Alps to the west, with which they are linked by the saddle of Timmelsjoch, the Stubai Alps form one of the biggest mountain blocks of the Eastern Alps.

=== Boundary and neighbouring mountain groups ===
In the Alpine Club classification of the Eastern Alps (AVE) the Stubai are no. 31. Their boundary follows the following line:

- in the north, it follows the course of the River Inn
  - in the northwest, it follows the Inn from its confluence with the Ötztaler Ache (near Ötztal railway station) to the confluence with the Gurglbach (near Imst), then to the Mieming Chain (AVE 4) in the Northern Limestone Alps
  - in the north, it follows the River Inn to Innsbruck, which divides the Stubai Alps from the Karwendel (AVE 5) in the Northern Limestone Alps
- in the east, it is formed by the Wipptal valley:
  - in the northeast it follows the Sill to its confluence with the Schmirnbach (Schmirntal) near St. Jodok, opposite the Tux Alps (AVE 33)
  - in the southeast, it follows the Sill to the Brenner Pass – Eisack to Sterzing, which separates the Stubai Alps from the Zillertal Alps (AVE 35)
- in the south it follows the lower Ridaunbach – Jaufenbach (Jaufental) – Jaufen Pass – St. Leonhard in Passeier, a line which divides it from the Sarntal Alps (AVE 32, which are counted as part of the Central Eastern Alps)
- in the west, it follows the line: Passeiertal – Schönauer Alm – Timmelsjoch – Timmelsbach – Gurgler Ache – Ötztaler Ache (the whole Ötz valley) to its confluence with the Inn, forming the boundary to the Ötztal Alps (AVE 30)

=== Subgroups ===
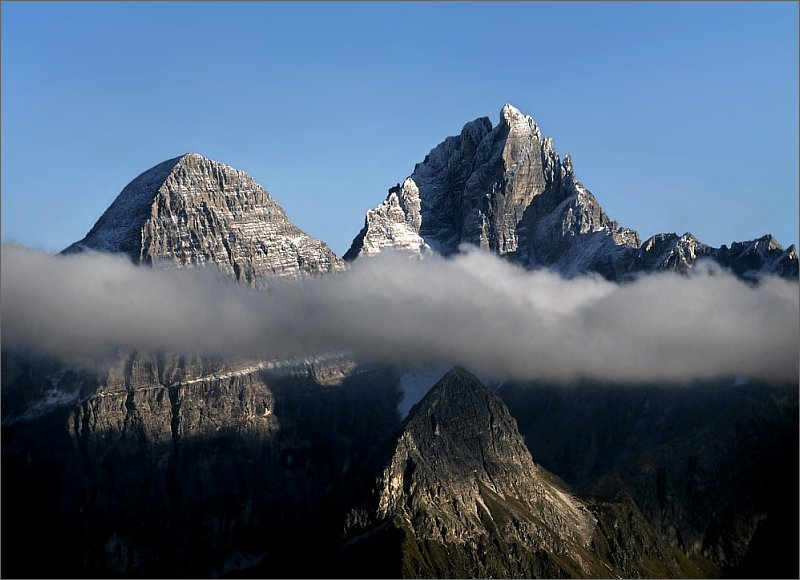
Gschnitzer and Pflerscher Tribulaun

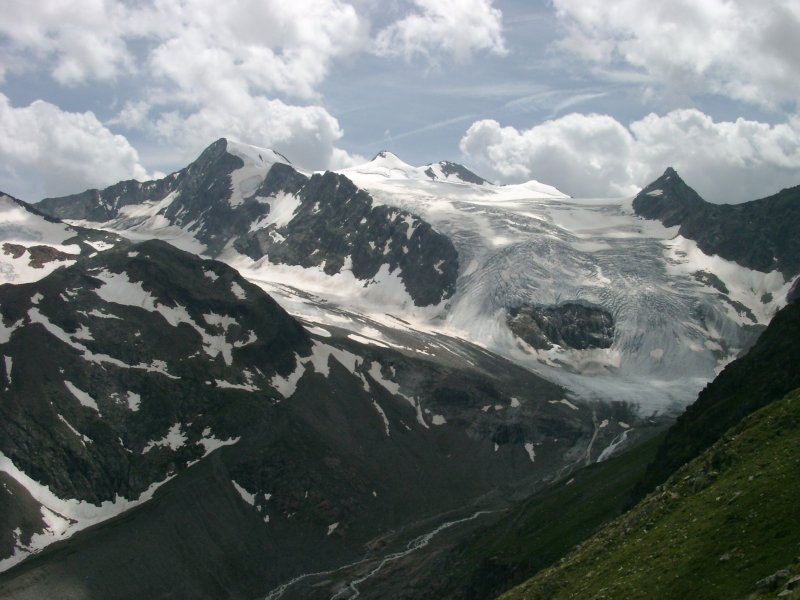
Zuckerhütl

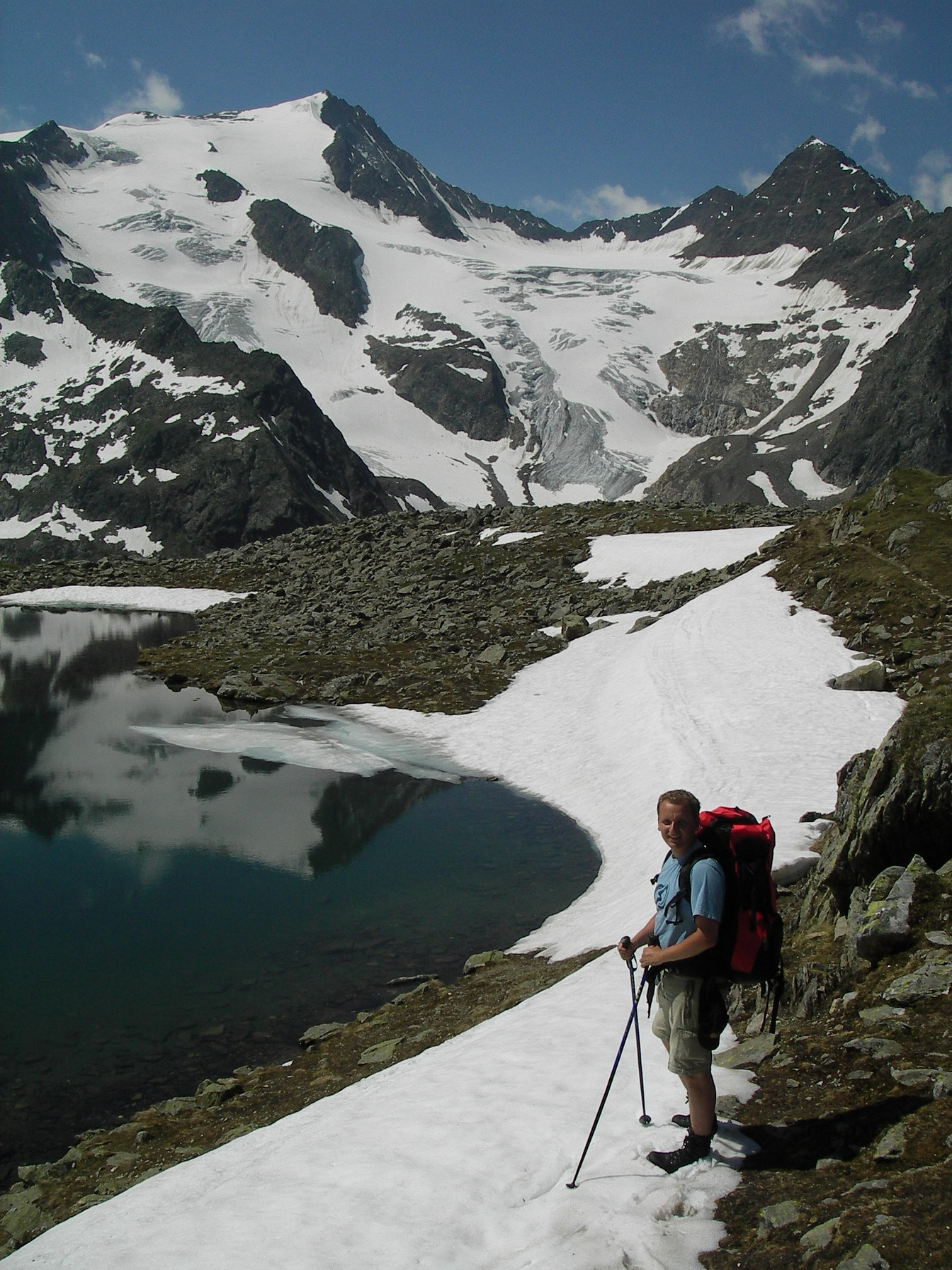
Glacier on the Wilder Freiger

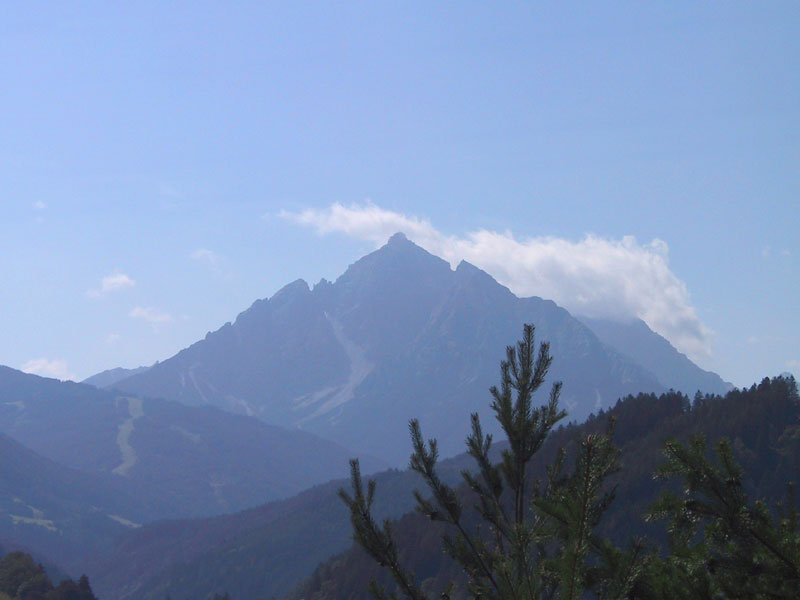
Serles

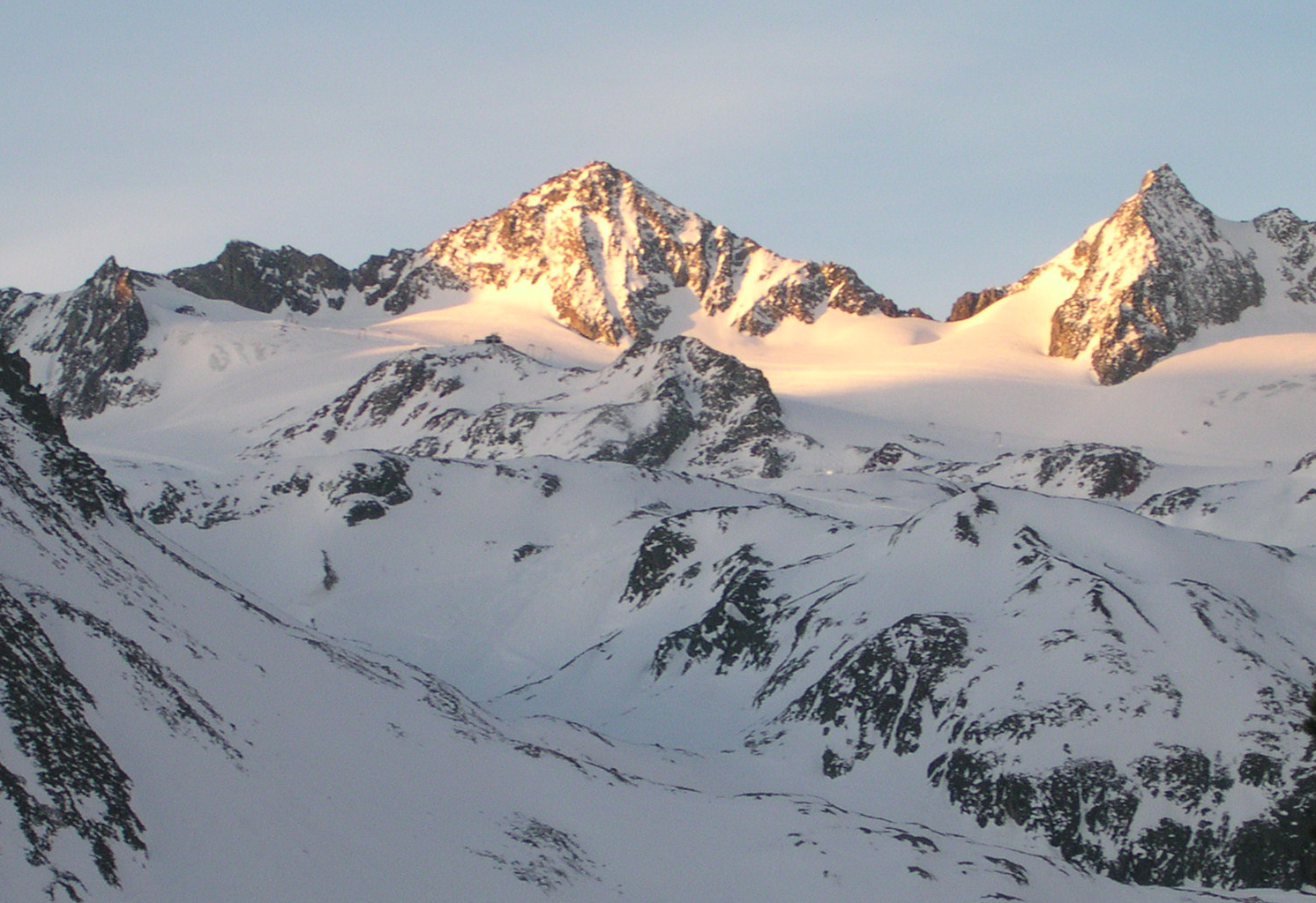
Stubaier Wildspitze

The Alpine Club guide to the Stubai Alps divides the range into 15 subgroups as follows:

- Northern Sellrain Mountains (Nördliche Sellrainer Berge), highest peak: Rietzer Grießkogel, 2,884 m
- Southwestern Sellrain Mountains (Südwestliche Sellrainer Berge), highest peak: Gleirscher Fernerkogel, 3,194 m
- Southeastern Sellrain Mountains (Südöstliche Sellrainer Berge), highest peak: Hohe Villerspitze, 3,092 m
- Larstig Mountains (Larstiger Berge) + Bachfallenstock, highest peak: Strahlkogel, 3,295 m
- Alpein Mountains (Alpeiner Berge), highest peak: Schrankogel, 3,497 m
- Habicht-Elfer-Kamm, highest peak: Habicht, 3,277 m
- Serleskamm, highest peak: Kirchdachspitze, 2,840 m
- Sulztalkamm, highest peak: Wilde Leck, 3,361 m
- Western Main Chain (Westlicher Hauptkamm), highest peak: Zuckerhütl, 3,507 m (also the highest mountain in the entire Stubai Alps)
- Central Main Chain (Mittlerer Hauptkamm), highest peak: Wilder Freiger, 3,418 m
- Eastern Main Chain (Östlicher Hauptkamm), highest peak: Pflerscher Tribulaun, 3,097 m
- Windach-Brunnenkogelkamm, highest peak: Jochköpfl, 3,143 m
- Botzergruppe + foothills, highest peak: Botzer, 3,250 m
- Aggls-Rosskopf-Kamm, highest peak: Agglsspitze, 3,196 m
- Kalkkögel, highest peak: Schlicker Seespitze, 2,804 m

=== Lakes ===
- Blaue Lacke

=== Peaks ===
The ten highest peaks in the Stubai Alps are:

- Zuckerhütl, 3,507 m
- Schrankogel, 3,497 m
- Pfaffenschneide, 3,498 m
- Ruderhofspitze, 3,474 m
- Sonklarspitze, 3,463 m
- Wilder Pfaff, 3,456 m
- Wilder Freiger, 3,418 m
- Östliche Seespitze, 3,416 m
- Schrandele, 3,393 m
- Hohes Eis, 3,388 m

There is a total of just under 500 named and surveyed mountains in the Stubai Alps. Amongst the better known are (in order of height and excluding the top ten above):

- Wilde Leck, 3,361 m
- Stubaier Wildspitze, 3,341 m
- Schaufelspitze, 3,332 m
- Lüsener Fernerkogel, 3,298 m
- Breiter Grießkogel, 3,287 m
- Habicht, 3,277 m
- Östlicher Feuerstein, 3,268 m
- Botzer, 3,250 m
- Schneespitze, 3,178 m
- Grubenwand, 3,173 m
- Pflerscher Tribulaun, 3,097 m
- Hohe Villerspitze, 3,087 m
- Gamsspitzl, 3,052 m
- Weißwandspitze, 3,017 m
- Sulzkogel, 3,016 m
- Hochreichkopf, 3,010 m
- Zischgeles, 3,004 m
- Roter Kogel, 2,832 m
- Gamskogel, 2,813 m
- Schlicker Seespitze, 2,804 m
- Serles, 2,717 m
- Hoher Burgstall, 2,611 m
- Lämpermahdspitze 2,595 m
- Elferspitze, 2,505 m
- Gargglerin, 2,470 m
- Saile (Nockspitze), 2,404 m
- Fleckner (Flecknerspitze), 2,331 m
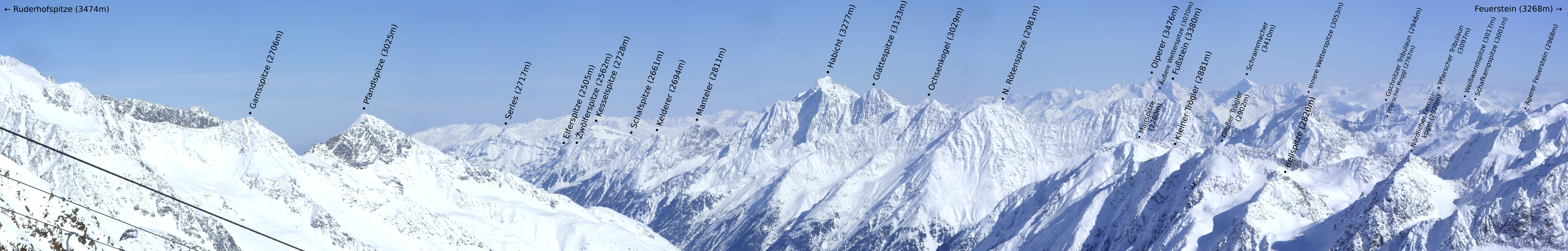
Annotated panorama of the Stubai Alps taken from the Daunscharte col on the Stubai Glacier.

=== Passes ===
The main mountain passes of the Stubai Alps are:

Mountain pass	Location	Type	Elevation (m/ft)	
Sonklarscharte	Sölden to Sterzing	snow	3327	10,916
Bildstockljoch	Sölden to Ranalt	snow	3138	10,296
Timmelsjoch (Passo del Rombo)	Sölden to Meran	road	2509	8232
Jaufen Pass/Passo di Monte Giovo	Sterzing to Meran	road	2094	6870
Brenner Pass	Innsbruck to Verona	highway, railway	1370	4495
