= Zuckerhütl =

Mountain in Tyrol, Austria

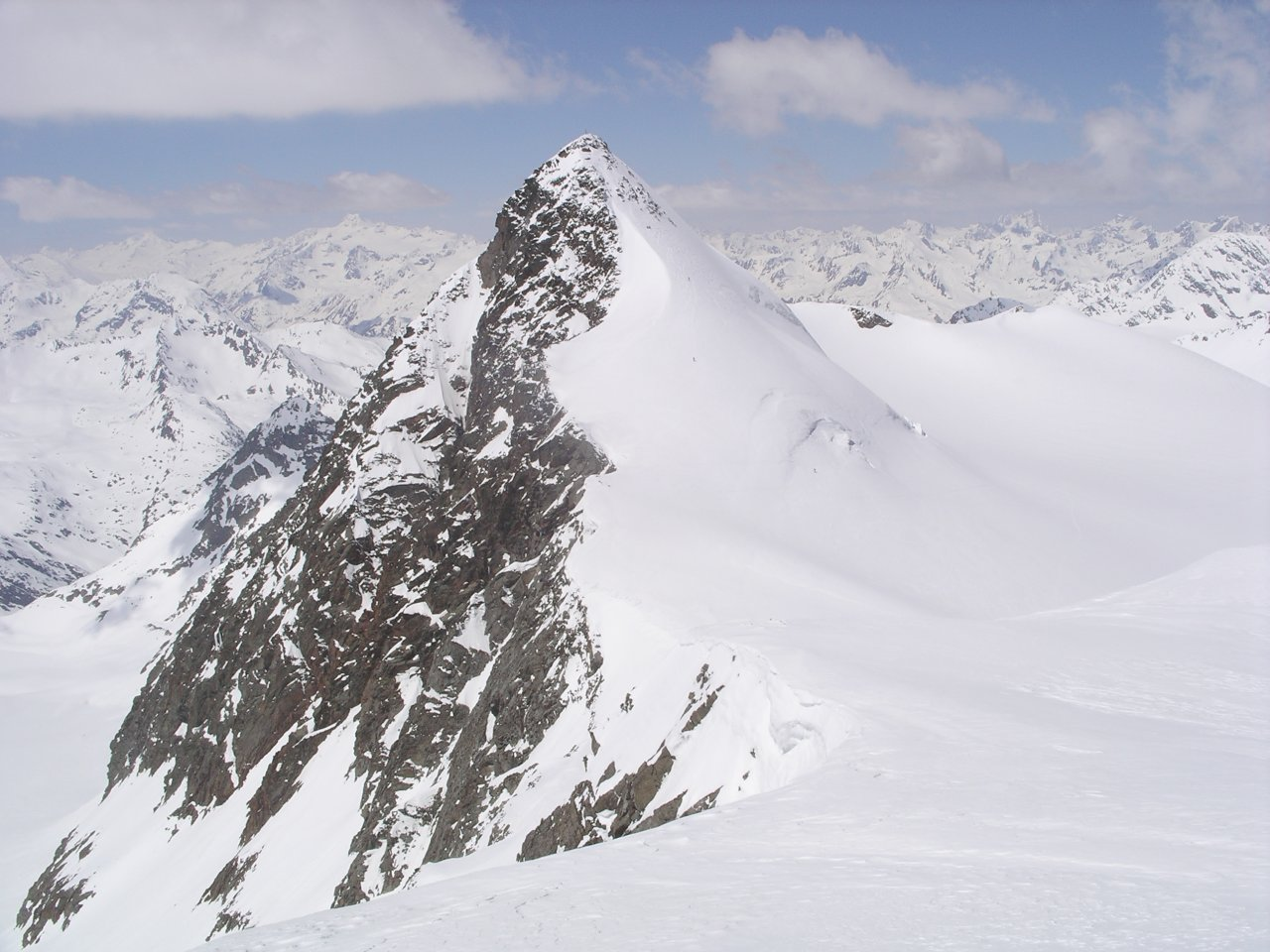
- Zuckerhütl

Highest point
- Elevation: 3,507 m (11,506 ft)
- Prominence: 1,033 m (3,389 ft)
- Listing: Alpine mountains above 3000 m
- Coordinates: 46°57′42″N 11°09′13″E

Geography
- Location within Alps
- Location: Tyrol, Austria
- Parent range: Stubai Alps

Climbing
- First ascent: 1863 by Joseph Anton Specht and Alois Tanzer

The Zuckerhütl is a mountain in Tyrol, Austria. At 3,505 metres (11,499 feet), it is the highest peak of the Stubai Alps and lies at the southern end of the Stubaital Valley.

It derives its name, the German for sugarloaf, from its conical shape. In nearby Italy it is known as Pan di Zùcchero, the Italian term for sugarloaf.

On the mountain's north face the huge Sulzenauferner glacier falls 1,000m from its summit, resembling an icefall which looks unclimbable without ladders. It is the views of this great glacier which give Zuckerhütl its name. On its south face a 500m high cliff drops down from the summit.

== Climbing ==
The summit was first reached by the pioneering German alpinist Joseph Anton Specht in 1862. Specht was a founder member of the German Alpine Club. It is now a very popular destination due to it being the highest mountain of the Stubai Alps and because of the view from the summit, which takes in all the major peaks of the Stubai Alps, the Ötztal Alps, the Zillertal Alps and the Ortler Alps. The normal route is along the east ridge.

== See also ==
- List of mountains of the Alps
