= Oberbergtal =

Valley in Tyrol, Austria

Coordinates: 47°06′54″N 11°14′08″E

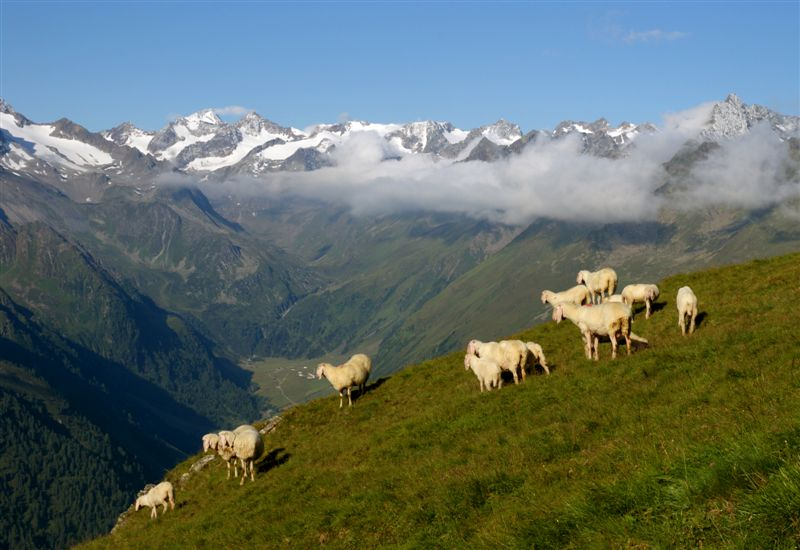
Oberbergtal in Tyrol, Austria

The Oberbergtal is the largest side valley of the Stubai Valley or Stubaital in Tyrol, Austria. It branches from the main valley near Milders and extends south-westward toward the alpine pastures and glaciers at its head. The valley is known for its distinctive glacial landforms, historical significance, and popularity as an access route for mountaineering in the Stubai Alps.

== Geography ==
The Oberbergtal joins the Stubai Valley from the left at Milders (1,026 m), within the municipality of Neustift im Stubaital. Its upper reaches are enclosed by the glaciated Alpeiner Mountains (Alpeiner Berge), whose principal peaks include the Schrankogel (3,497 m), Ruderhofspitze (3,474 m), Östliche Seespitze (3,416 m), and Westliche Seespitze (3,355 m). These summits surround the Alpeiner Ferner glacier and several tributary glaciers.

Downstream, the bounding ridges fall gradually toward the Brennerspitze (2,877 m) on the right-hand side and traverse the Hohe Villerspitze (3,087 m) on the left before descending to the Hohe Burgstall (2,611 m).

Geologically, the Oberbergtal exhibits a broad, trough-shaped profile formed by Pleistocene glaciation. Only in its lowest section, beginning near Bärenbad, does it transition into a narrower, V-shaped valley. The Alpeiner Bach, rising from the Alpeiner Ferner, becomes known as the Oberbergbach from the Oberissalm downward. Near the Alpeiner Alm, at around 2,000 m, part of its flow is diverted to the Sellrain–Silz power plant group, operated by Tiroler Wasserkraftwerke AG (TIWAG).

== Settlement and Land Use ==
Permanent habitation extends up the valley as far as Seduck (1,472 m). Above this point lie alpine pastures that are used seasonally for grazing. The highest building in the valley is the Franz-Senn-Hütte (2,149 m), constructed in 1885 by the Austrian Alpine Club. Today it is one of the most important mountain huts in the Stubai Alps and serves as a base for training courses and for stages along the Stubai High Trail.

== History ==
The Oberbergtal has a long cultural and mountaineering history. An early reference appears in the hunting records of Emperor Maximilian I, which mention the now-lost field name Naggewann. One of the earliest recorded “tourist” visits occurred in 1765 when Emperor Joseph II ascended to the Alpeiner Ferner, suggesting that the glacier was already considered a notable destination.

A prominent early 19th-century visit took place on 8 September 1823, when Archduchess Maria Luisa of Parma, the widow of Napoleon, was carried to the Alpeiner Ferner accompanied by riflemen and a brass band. A photograph associated with this event—an unusual document of early female alpine travel—is preserved in the Tyrolean State Museum (Ferdinandeum).

== Access Road and Recent Developments ==
The upper Oberbergtal is reached via an access road leading from Seduck toward the Oberissalm. Following a landslide in 2021 and severe storms in 2022, portions of this road were heavily damaged. The state of Tyrol identified an ongoing risk of rockfall, leading to the closure of the road to public traffic and the construction of a temporary emergency access track.

The emergency road is currently accessible only to suppliers serving alpine pastures and mountain huts during the summer months. Due to disagreements among landowners, long-term repairs were delayed, despite the road's importance for tourism and for access to the Franz-Senn-Hütte. Day-visitor numbers at the hut reportedly declined by up to 90% following the closure, as the typical approach time doubled from 1.5 to 3 hours.

In April 2024, the Tyrolean state government announced that the Seduck–Oberiss road would be converted into a public private road, allowing the initiation of formal procedures for renovation and safety measures. Financing is to be provided through the state infrastructure program and disaster relief funds, with projected costs of approximately €1.5 million. A road-law hearing is expected to clarify the legal status and timeline for reopening. However, full implementation depends on land acquisition for protective structures such as rockfall barriers.

As of mid-2024, the future of the emergency access road—and reliable public access to the upper Oberbergtal—remains uncertain, with negotiations between the municipality of Neustift and landowners ongoing.

== Tourism ==
The Oberbergtal is a significant recreational area for hikers, ski tourers, and mountaineers. The Franz-Senn-Hütte is one of the most frequented alpine refuges in Tyrol and forms a key link on the Stubai High Trail. The valley's dramatic glacial scenery, combined with its cultural history, continues to make it a notable destination in the Stubai Alps.

== See also ==
- Stubai Alps
- Stubai Valley
- Franz-Senn-Hütte
- Alpeiner Ferner
