= Stubai Hohenweg =

High altitude trail, Tyrol, Austria

Coordinates: 47°02′50″N 11°12′11″E

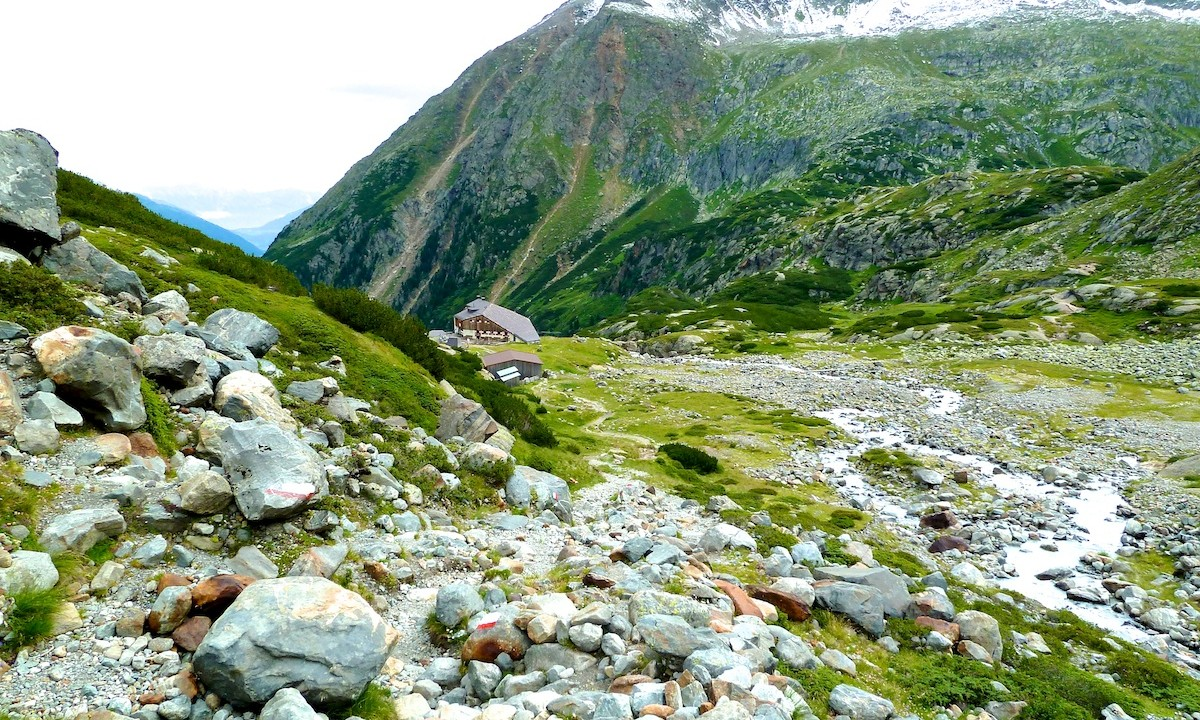
- Sulzenau hut on the Stubai trail
- Length: 120 kilometres (70 mi) approximately
- Location: Tyrol, Austria
- Use: Hiking
- Highest point: 2,858 m (9,377 ft)
- Difficulty: Difficult
- Season: Summer to early autumn
- Months: Mid-June to early October

The Stubai Hohenweg or Stubai highroute is a high-level footpath in Tyrol, Austria. It is approximately 80 km long, and a total ascent / descent of over 6,000 m. The trail can be completed in 8 or 9 days. It is designed to be a circular route around the Stubai valley. The trail starts in Neustift, but can be started from any hut on the trail, for example Fulpmes.

The path is by alpine and high alpine terrain, between 2000 and 3000 m. Some sections are secured by cable, but the route avoids glaciers.

The difficulty level of the trail is "black", namely the hiker would encounter narrow, steep and exposed paths. For this reason, good physical fitness, freedom from vertigo and surefootedness are required.

== Stages ==
	Start	Finish	Time	Related summits
1	Fulpmes/Kreuzjoch	Starkenburger Hut	1,5 h	Schlicker Seespitze (2.804 m, 3 h)
2	Starkenburger Hütte	Franz Senn Hut	6 h	Rinnenspitze (3.000 m, 3 h); Aperer Turm (2.986 m, 3,5 h)
3	Franz-Senn-Hütte	Neue Regensburger Hut	4 h	Ruderhofspitze (3.474 m, 4,5 h); Östliche Knotenspitze (3.101 m, 2,5 h)
4	Neue Regensburger Hütte	Dresdner Hut	6 h	Zuckerhütl (3.507 m, 4,5 h); Stubaier Wildspitze (3.341 m, 3 h)
5	Dresdner Hütte	Sulzenau Hut	2,5 h (über Peiljoch, 2.672 m); 3,5 h (über Großer Trögler, 2.902 m)	Zuckerhütl (3.507 m, 5 h); Wilder Freiger (3.418 m, 4 h)
6	Sulzenau Hütte	Nurnberger Hut	3 h (über Niederl, 2.629 m); 3,5 h (über Mairspitze, 2.743 m)	Wilder Freiger (3.418 m, 4 h); Östlicher Feuerstein (3.267 m, 4 h)
7	Nürnberger Hütte	Bremer Hütte	3 h	Innere Wetterspitze (3.053 m, 1,5 h)
8	Bremer Hütte	Innsbrucker Hütte	7 h	Habicht (3.277 m, 2,5 h); Kalkwand (2.564 m, 1 h)
9	Innsbrucker Hütte	Neustift	4 h	Elferspitze (2.505 m)

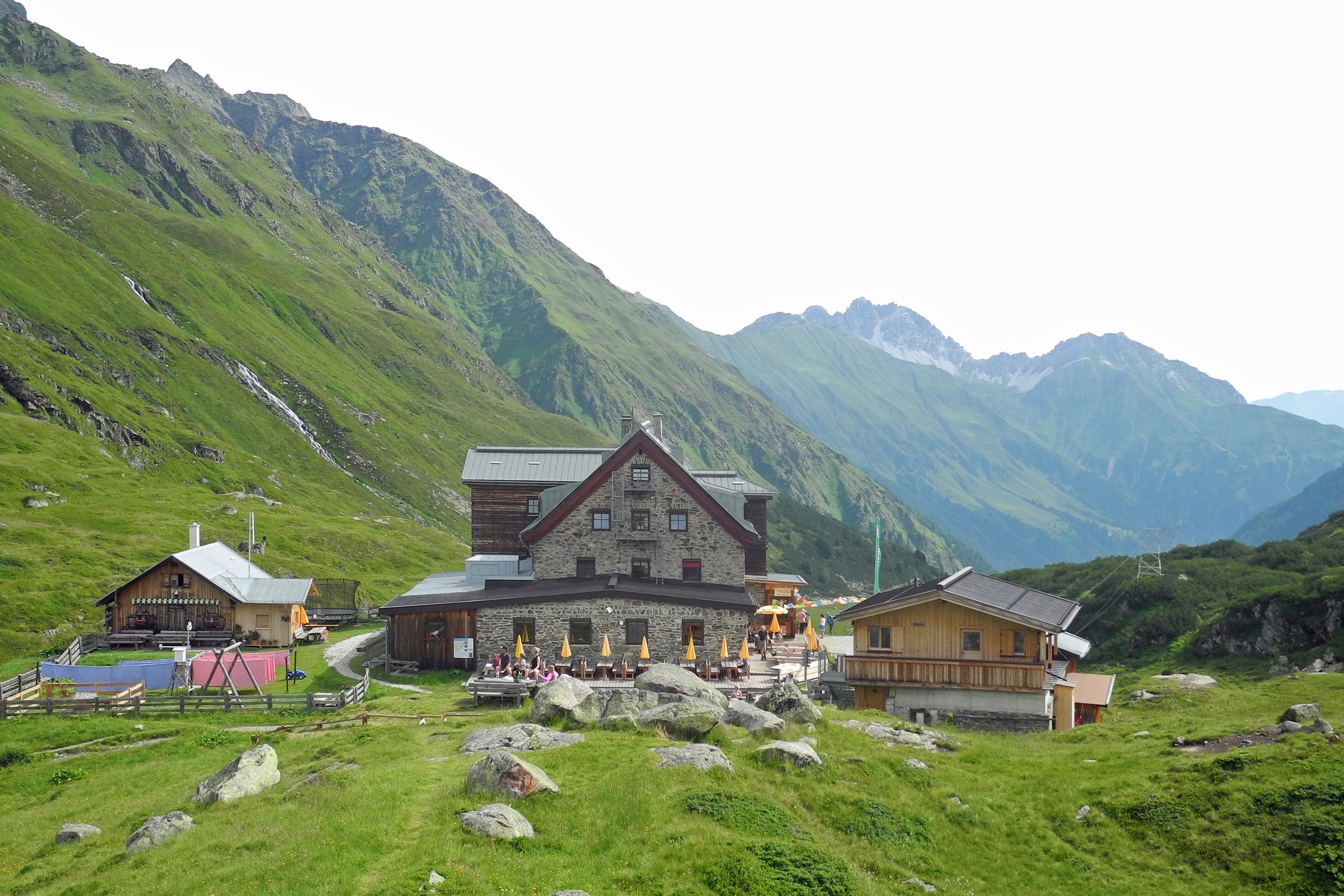
Franz-Senn-Hütte

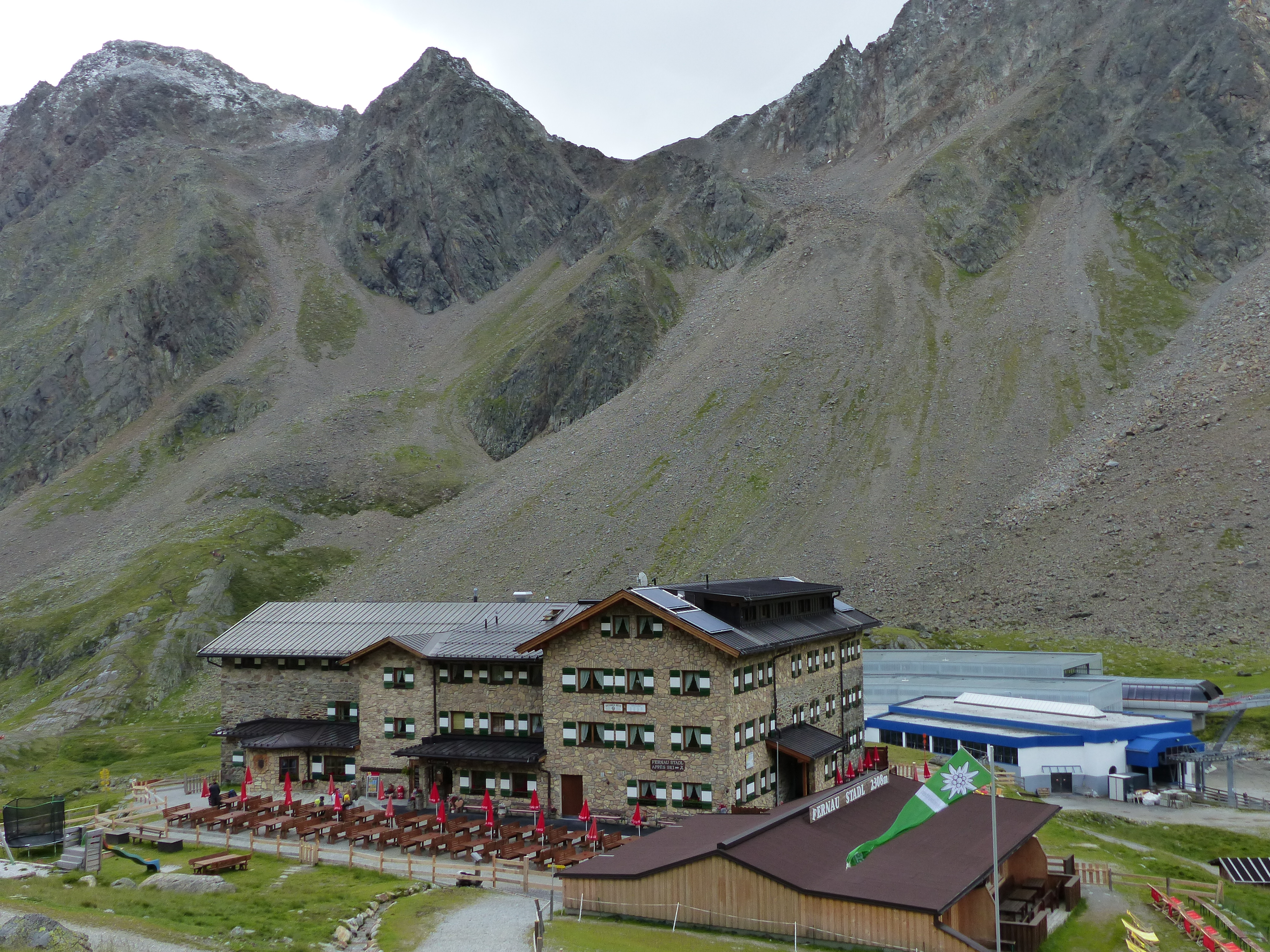
Dresdner Hütte

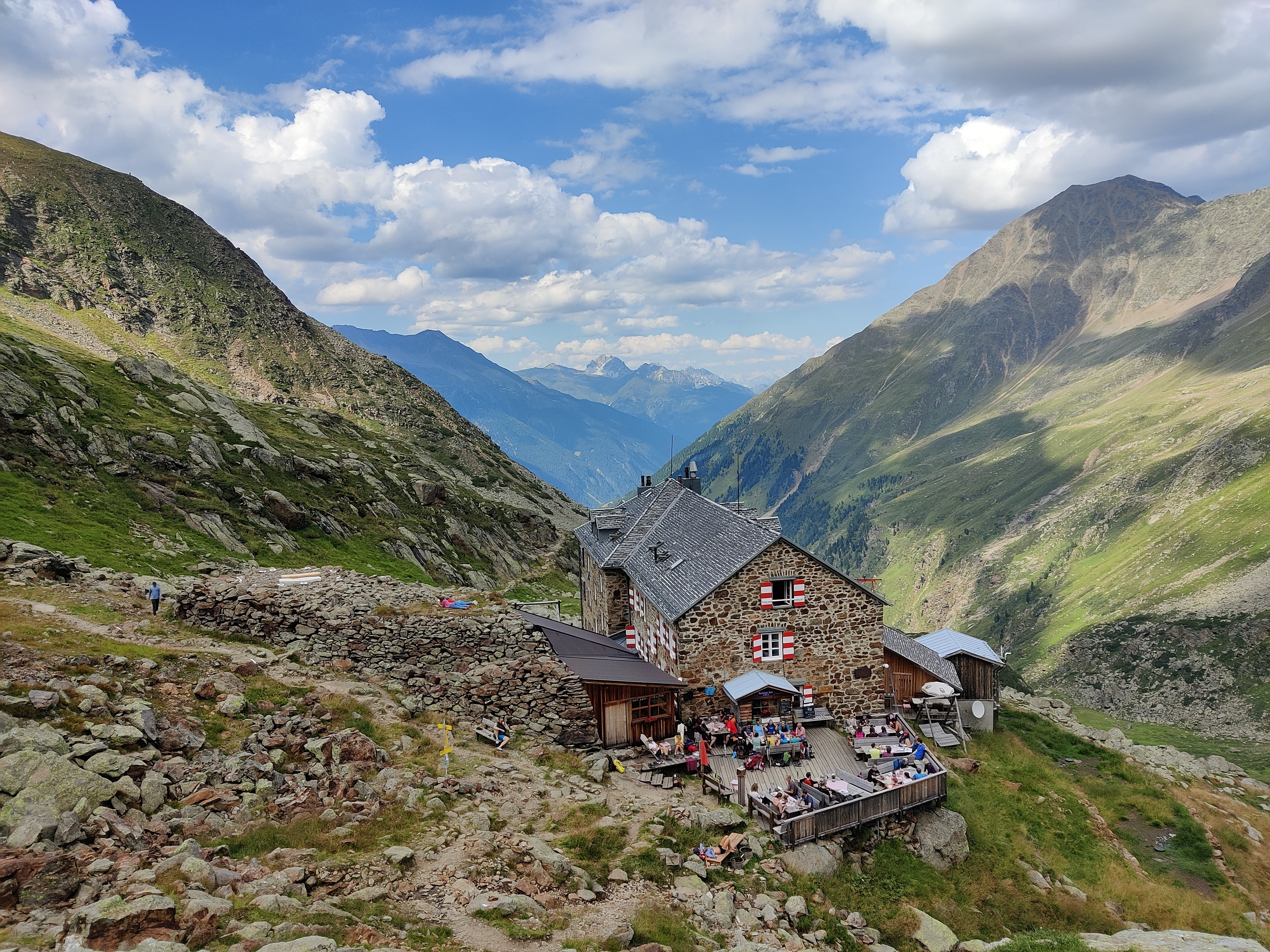
Nürnberger Hütte

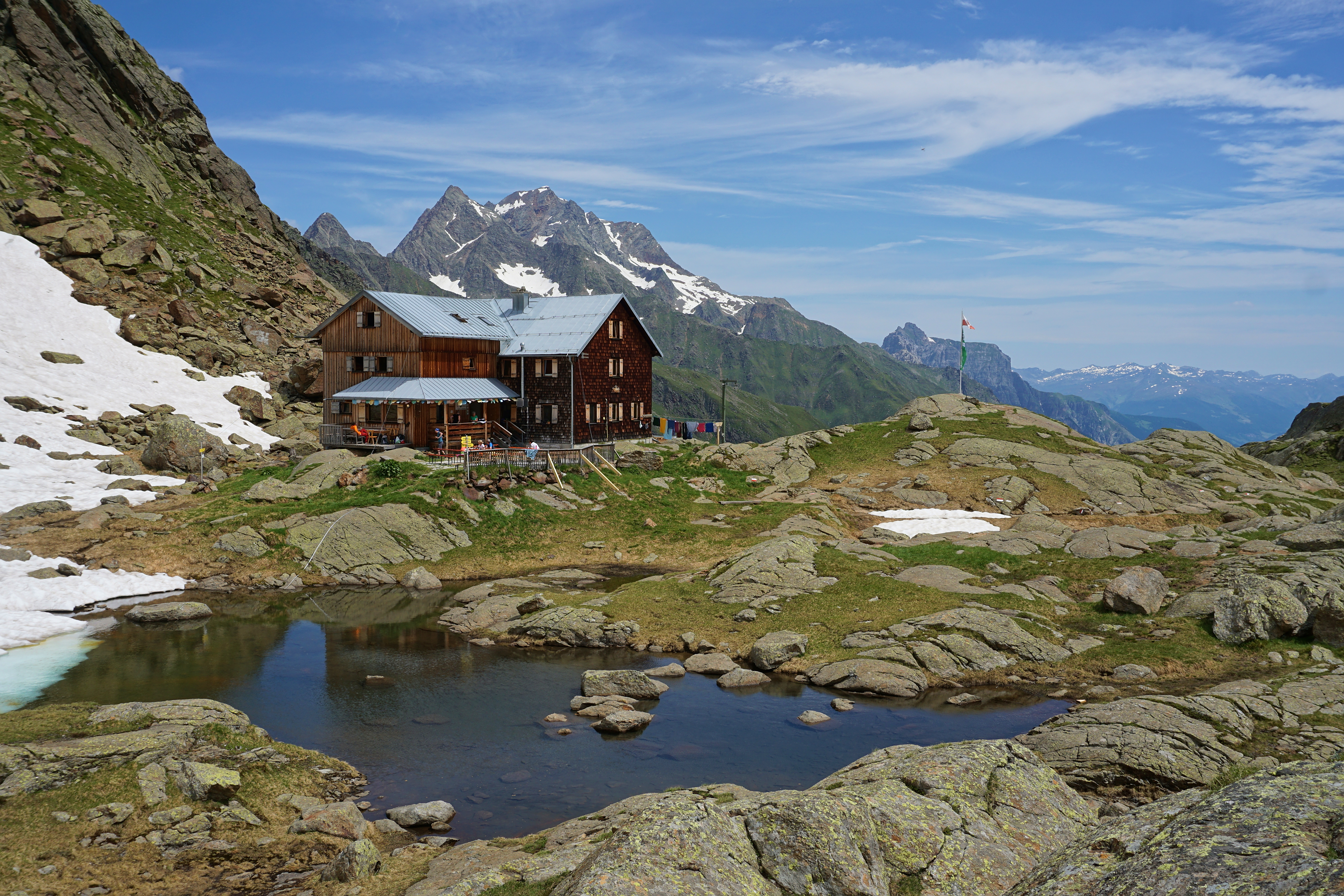
Bremer Hütte
