= Fotscherbach =

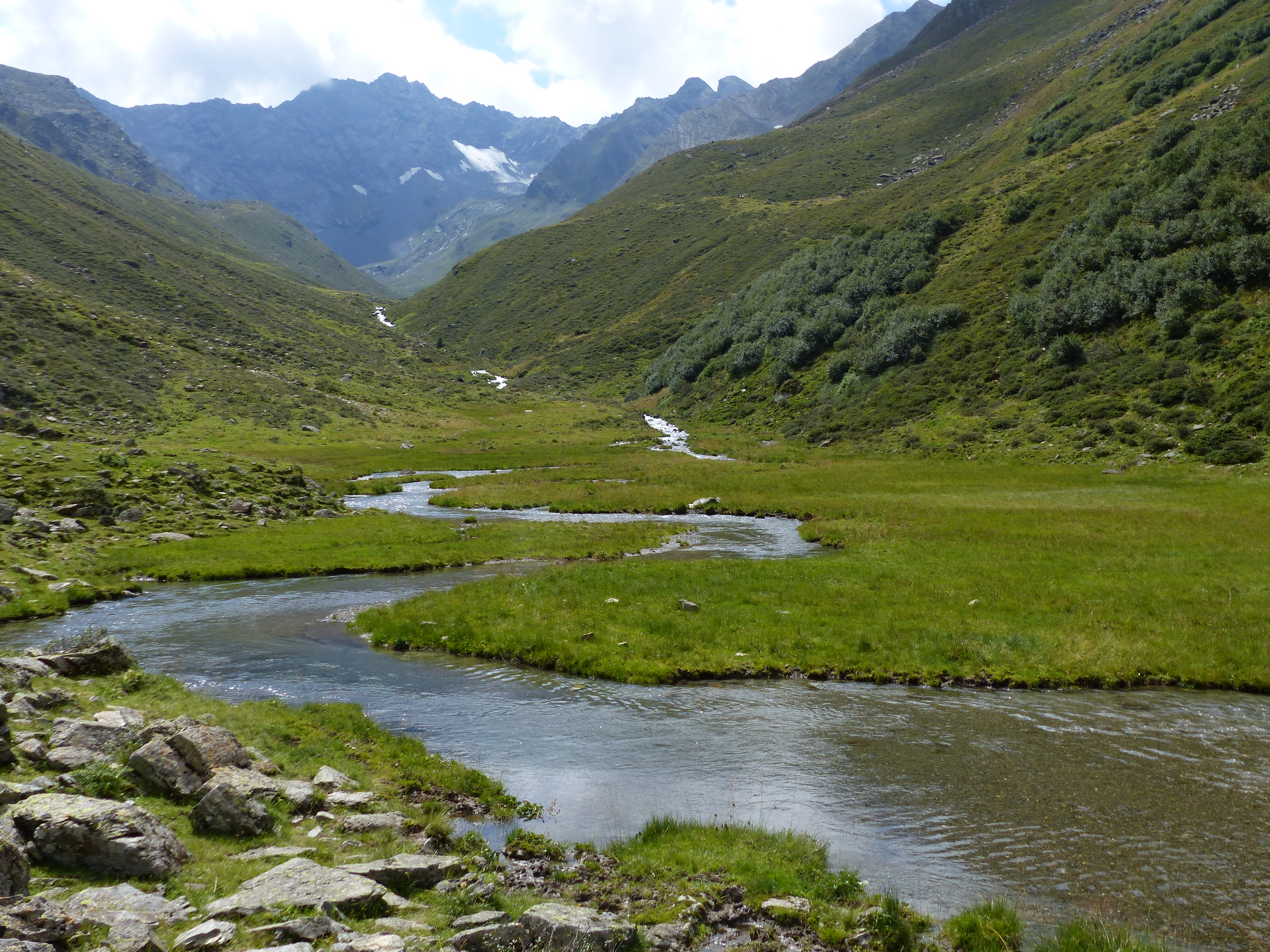
- Fotscherbach

Location
- Country: Austria
- State: Tyrol

Physical characteristics
- Source
  - location: Stubai Alps
- Mouth
  - location: Melach
  - coordinates: 47.2142°N 11.2142°E
- Length: ~ 12.30 km (7.64 mi)

Basin features
- Progression: Melach→ Inn→ Danube→ Black Sea

The Fotscherbach is a river of Tyrol, Austria.

The Fotscherbach has a length of 12.30 km (7.64 mi). It originates in the Stubai Alps on a height of 2200 m (AA) (7,200 ft). It flows in northern direction to the village of Sellrain where it dischanges from the right into the Melach. The water has A/B grade quality. In 2016, WWF Tirol announced that the Fotscherbach was designated as protect nature reserve. The river supplies water is to the Sellrain hydroelectric power plant.
