= Rotgratspitze =

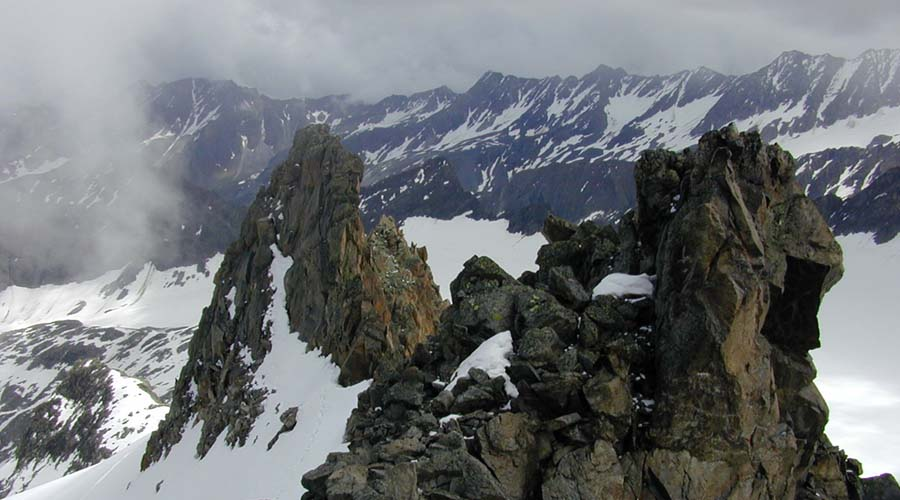
East summit from West

The Rotgratspitze (3,237 metres) is a mountain in the Stubai Alps, close to the Lisenser Fernerkogel.

== Routes ==
From the Franz Senn Hütte hut it is approximately 3 1/2 hours mostly over glaciers and snow. The West summit is marginally higher and fairly easy. The East would be a bit dodgy to solo.

== See also ==
- Panorama including Rotgrat from Lisenser Spitze
