= Lisenser Fernerkogel =

Mountain in the Stubai Alps of Austria

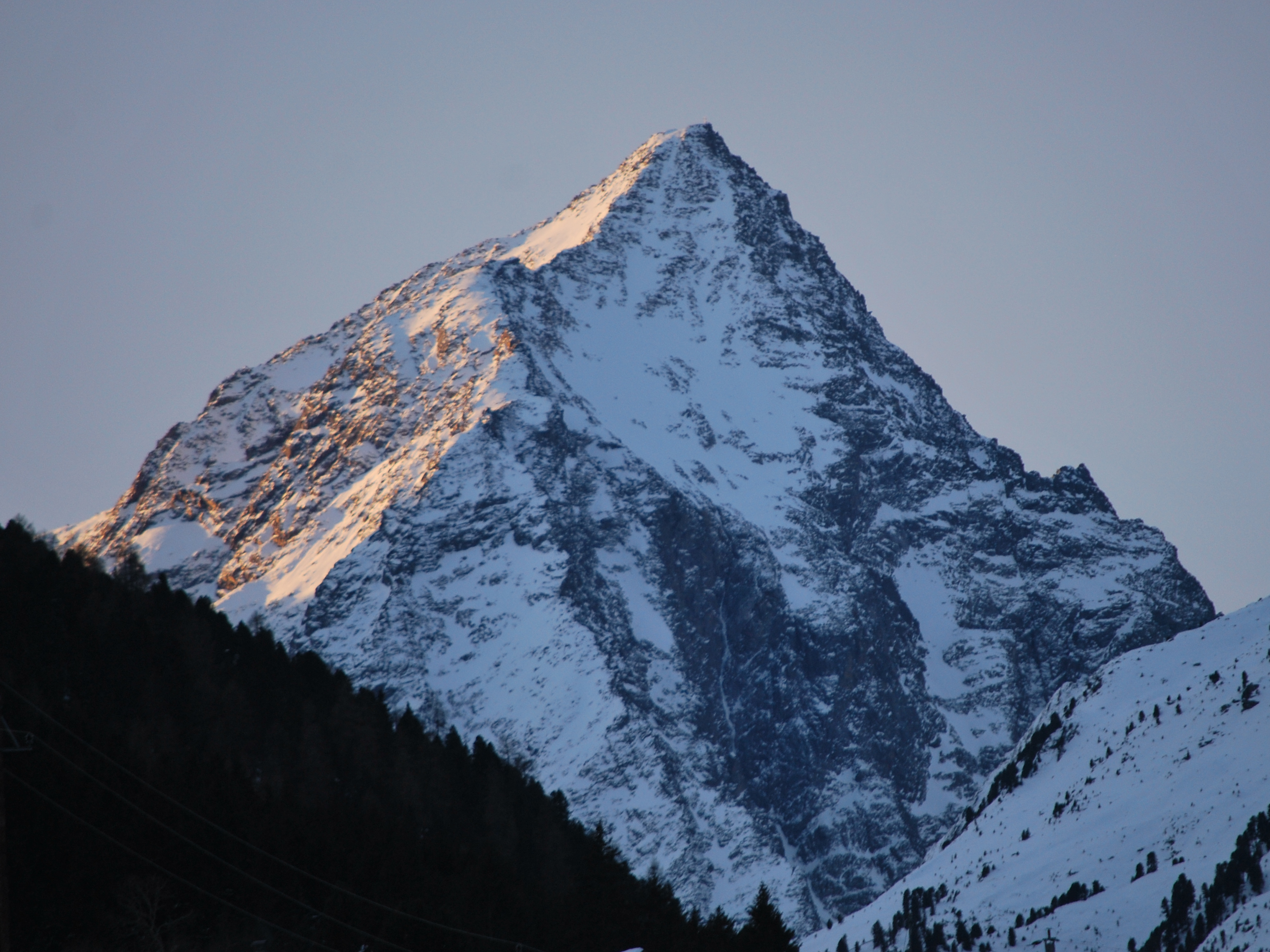
- The Lisenser Fernerkogel from the north (from Gries im Sellrain)

Highest point
- Elevation: 3,298 m (10,820 ft)
- Prominence: 161 m (528 ft)
- Coordinates: 47°05′N 11°06′E

Geography
- Location: Tyrol, Austria
- Parent range: Stubai Alps

Climbing
- First ascent: 23 August 1836 by Peter Karl Thurwieser, Lipp Schöpf and Jackob Kofler
- Easiest route: glacier/snow/scramble

The Lisenser Fernerkogel (or Lüsener Fernerkogel) is a mountain in the Stubai Alps of Austria.

== Routes ==
From the Franz Senn Hütte hut it is approximately 3½ hours mostly over glaciers and snow, with a small (100 m) easy rock scramble at the end.

Close to, and can be combined with, the Rotgratspitze and Lisenser Spitze.
