= Kematen in Tirol =

- Municipality
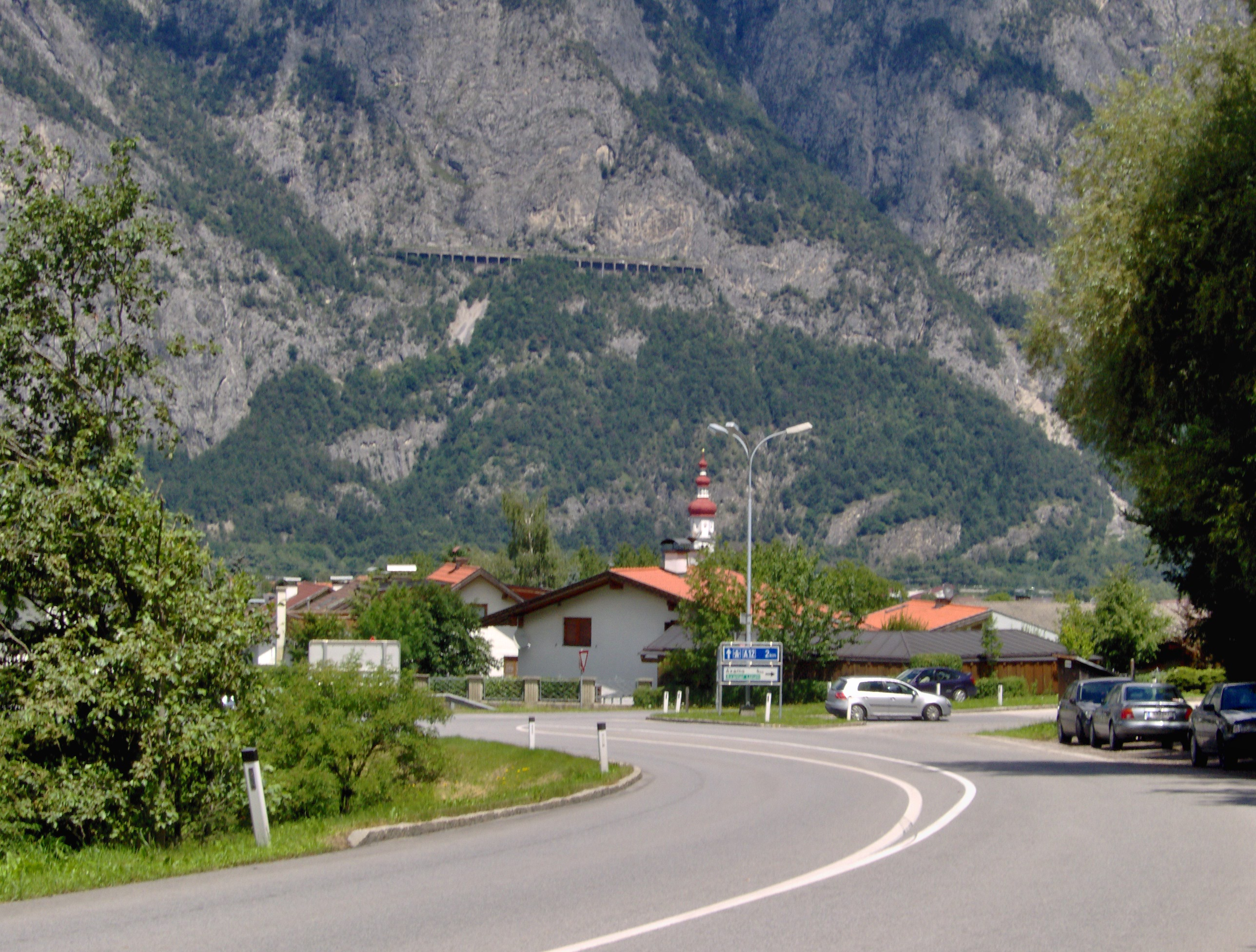

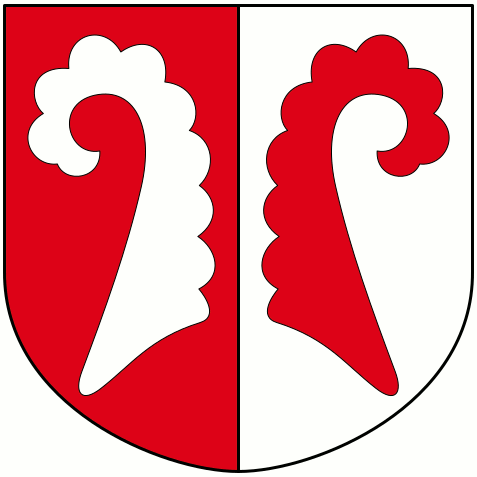
- Coat of arms

- Location within Austria
- Coordinates: 47°15′15″N 11°16′20″E
- Country: Austria
- State: Tyrol
- District: Innsbruck Land

Government
  - Mayor: Klaus Gritsch

Area
  - Total: 6.99 km^{2} (2.70 sq mi)
- Elevation: 610 m (2,000 ft)

Population (2021)
  - Total: 3,014
  - Density: 431/km^{2} (1,120/sq mi)
- Time zone: UTC+1 (CET)
  - Summer (DST): UTC+2 (CEST)
- Postal code: 6175
- Area code: 05232
- Vehicle registration: IL
- Website: www.kematen.org

Kematen in Tirol is a municipality in the district Innsbruck-Land located about 12 km west of Innsbruck. The Melach river flows into the Inn river in Kematen. Kematen was first mentioned as "Caminata" around 600.

== Population ==
Historical population
Year	Pop.	±%
1869	586	—
1880	534	−8.9%
1890	506	−5.2%
1900	546	+7.9%
1910	654	+19.8%
1923	601	−8.1%
1934	649	+8.0%
1939	708	+9.1%
1951	2,180	+207.9%
1961	1,550	−28.9%
1971	1,650	+6.5%
1981	2,100	+27.3%
1991	2,258	+7.5%
2001	2,582	+14.3%
2011	2,571	−0.4%

== Geography ==
Kematen is located in the Inn Valley, at the confluence of the Melach River (from the Sellrain Valley) into the River Inn. The municipal area lies mainly on the alluvial cone of the Melach south of the Inn. The Inn and Melach rivers form the northern and western boundaries of the municipality. Here lies the geographical (less the cultural) border between the Upper Inn Valley and the Lower Inn Valley.

== History ==
The village name Kematen probably goes back to the Latin caminata, which means "heated chamber". The place is first mentioned in documents around 1143 as "Kemenatin" in records of the Dießen Abbey founded by the Counts of Dießen-Andechs. The Wilten Abbey also had property in Kematen.
