= Kirchdachspitze =

Mountain in the Stubai Alps, Austria

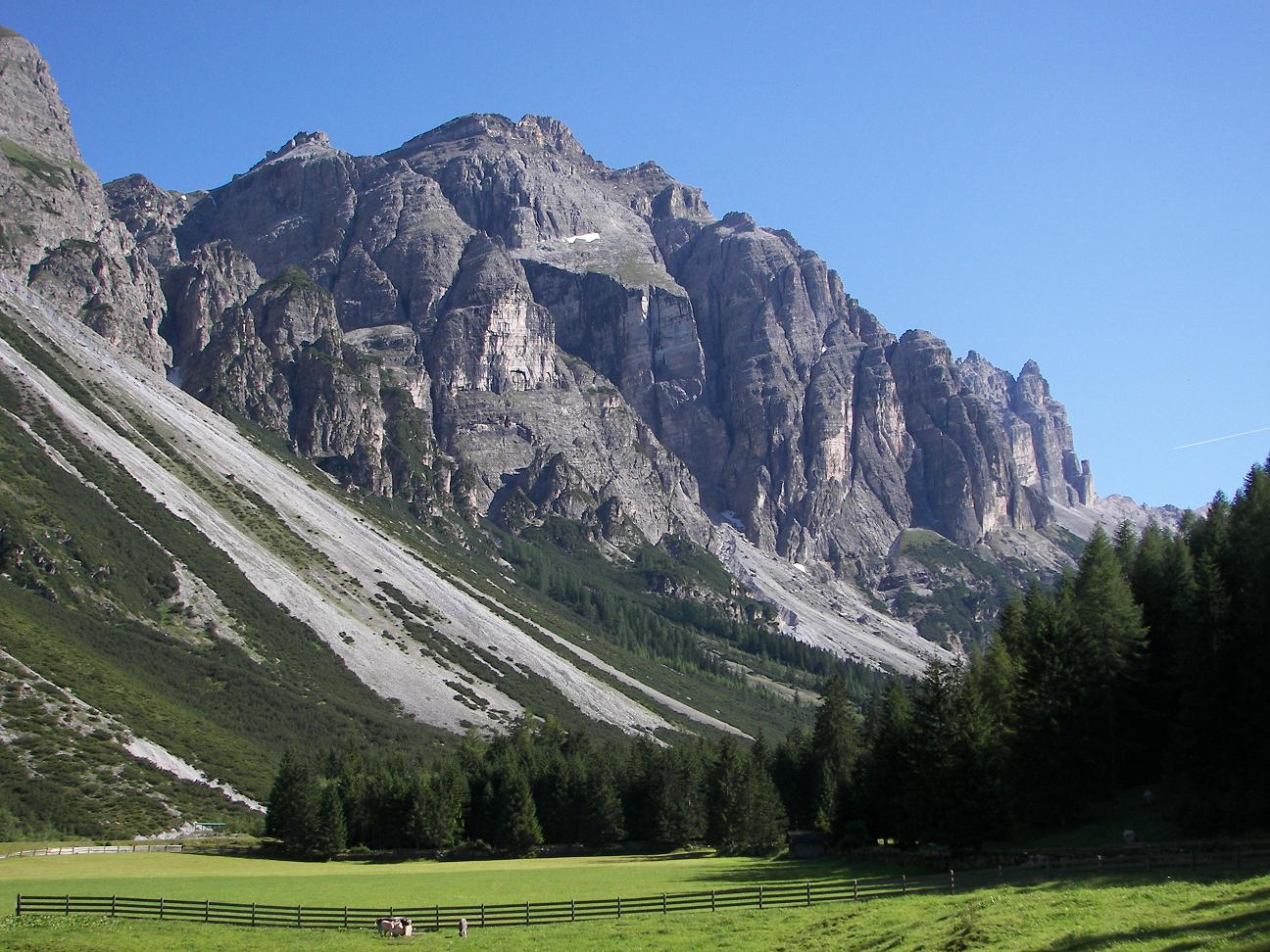
- The Kirchdach above the Pinnis valley

Highest point
- Elevation: 2,840 m (AA) (9,320 ft)
- Prominence: 2,840-2,370 m ↓ Pinnisjoch
- Isolation: 4.2 km → Habicht
- Coordinates: 47°04′04″N 11°20′33″E

Geography
- Location within Austria
- Location: Tyrol, Austria
- Parent range: Stubai Alps

Geology
- Rock age: Norian
- Rock type: Main dolomite

Climbing
- Normal route: from the Padasterjochhaus

The Kirchdach, also Kirchdachspitze, is a mountain, 2,840 m (AA), in the Stubai Alps in Tyrol, Austria.

== Geography ==
The Kirchdach is the highest point on the Serleskamm ridge, which separates the valleys of Gschnitztal in the southeast from the Pinnistal and Stubaital in the northwest. It is situated between the 2,692 m high Ilmspitze to the southwest and the 2,528 m high Hammerspitze to the northeast.

== Ascent ==
The Kirchdach may be ascended from the west from the alpine pasture of the Pinnisalm (1,560 m) in the Pinnis valley along the Jubiläumssteig path in ca. 4 hours. From the Issenangeralm (1,366 m), also in the Pinnis valley, the Rohrauersteig path takes ca. 4 hours to the top approaching the summit from the north. From the Gschnitztal valley the Padasterjochhaus (2,232 m) northeast of the Kirchdach acts as a base; from there it takes 2 hours to reach the top.

All the routes run from the saddle of Silbersattel (2,750 m) along the north arête, which is exposed in places and secured, for the final 90 metres in height to the summit.

== Climbing ==
A number of climbing routes have been opened up the wild north and northeast faces, all of which have rarely been repeated. A leading pioneer of these rock faces was Andreas Orgler in the 1980s. He also opened up many ice and mixed climbing routes.

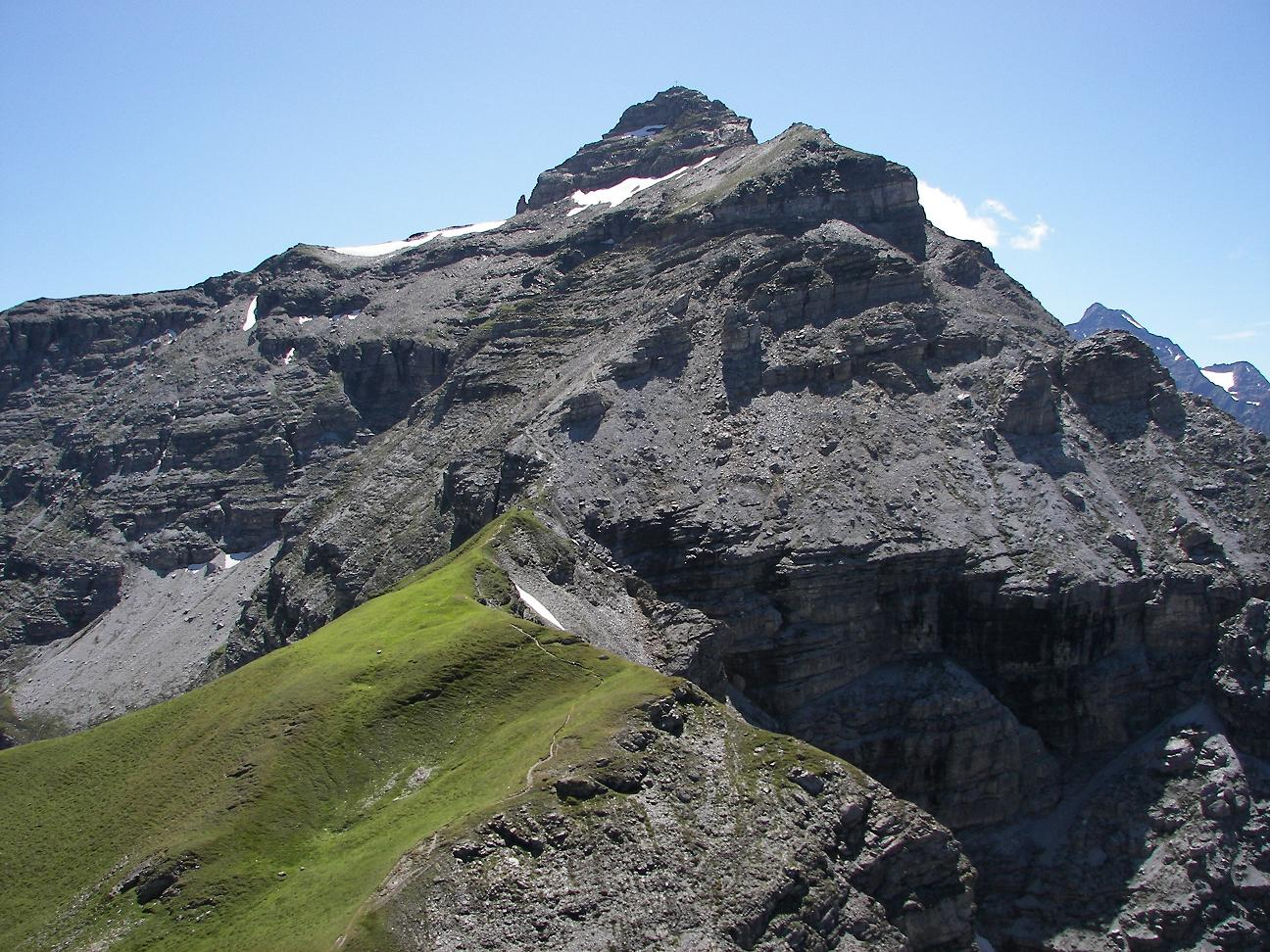
The Kirchdachspitze from the northeast

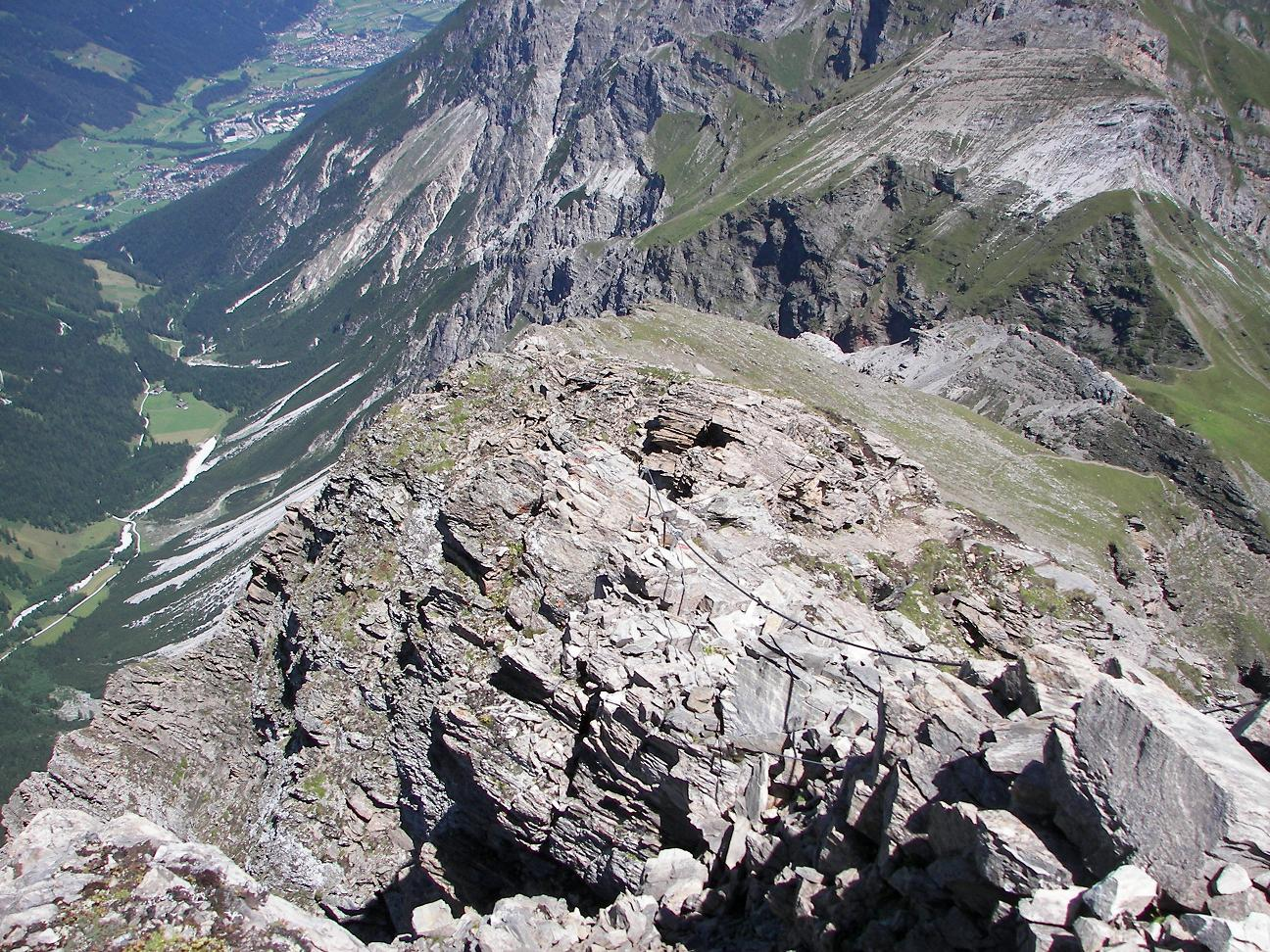
The partly protected north arête

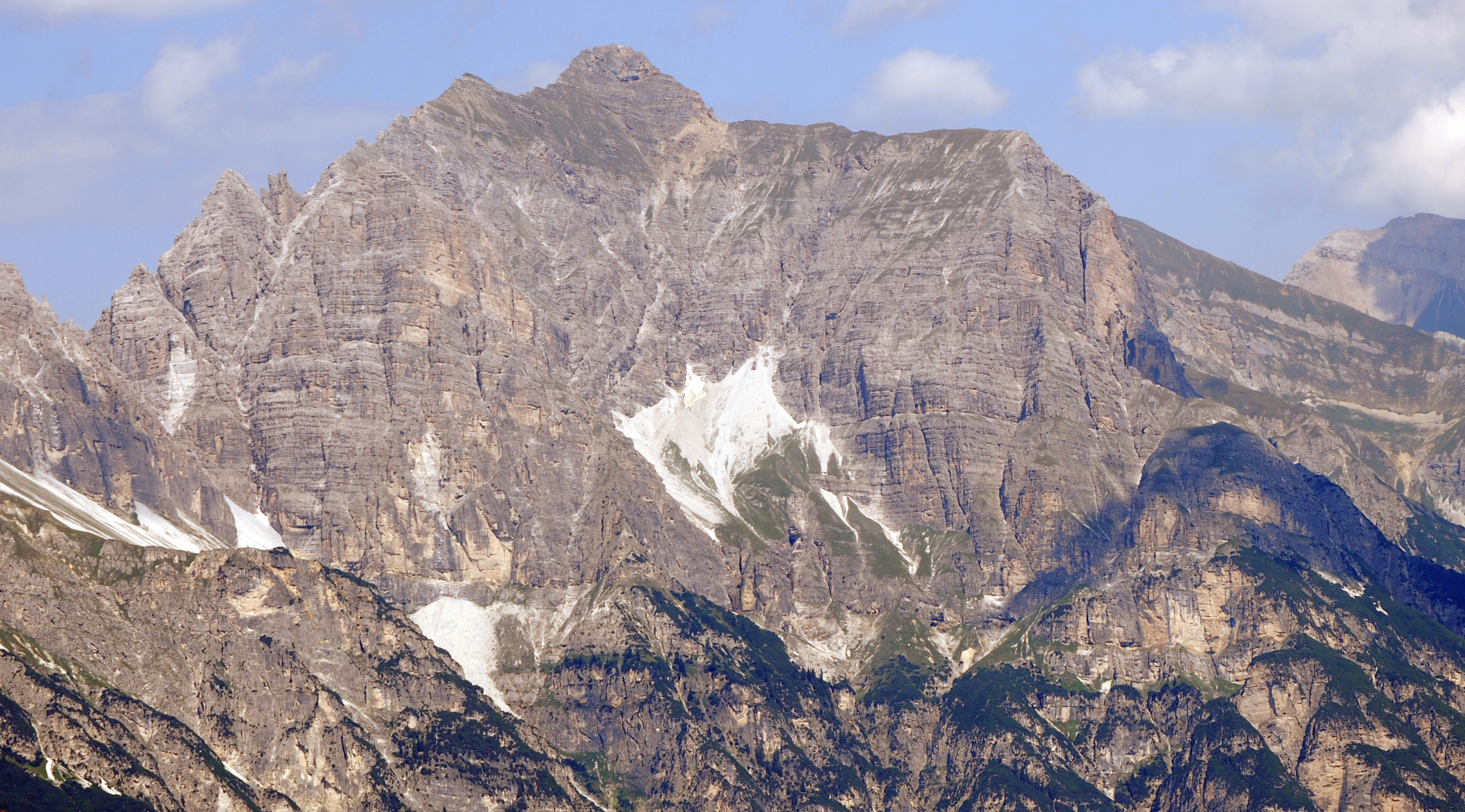
The Kirchdach from the south

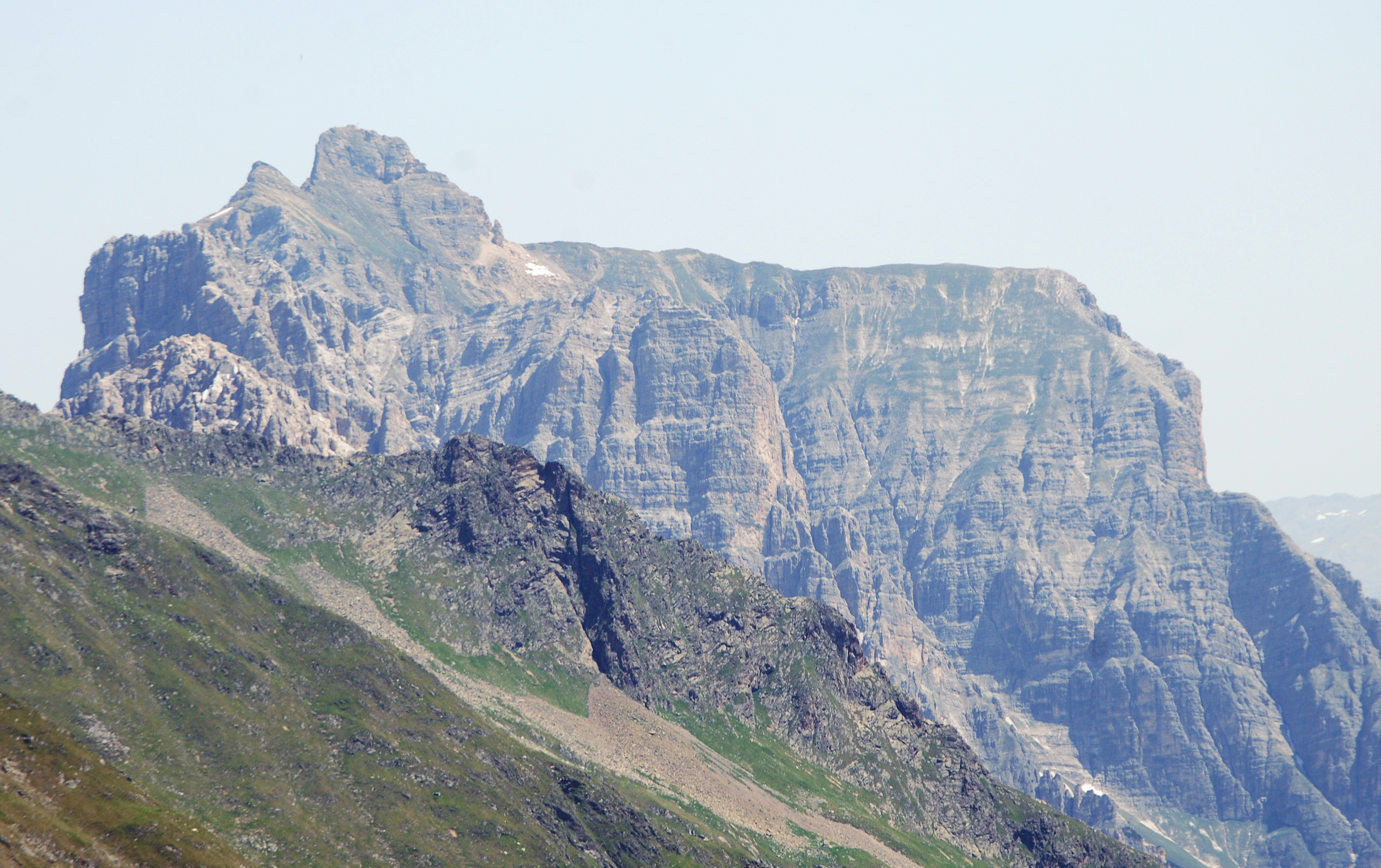
From the southwest

== Literature ==
- Klier, Heinrich; Klier, Walter (1980), Alpine Club guide Stubaier Alpen (in German), Munich: Rother Bergverlag, pp. 281–285, ISBN 3-7633-1212-9
