= Östliche Seespitze =

Mountain in Tyrol, Austria

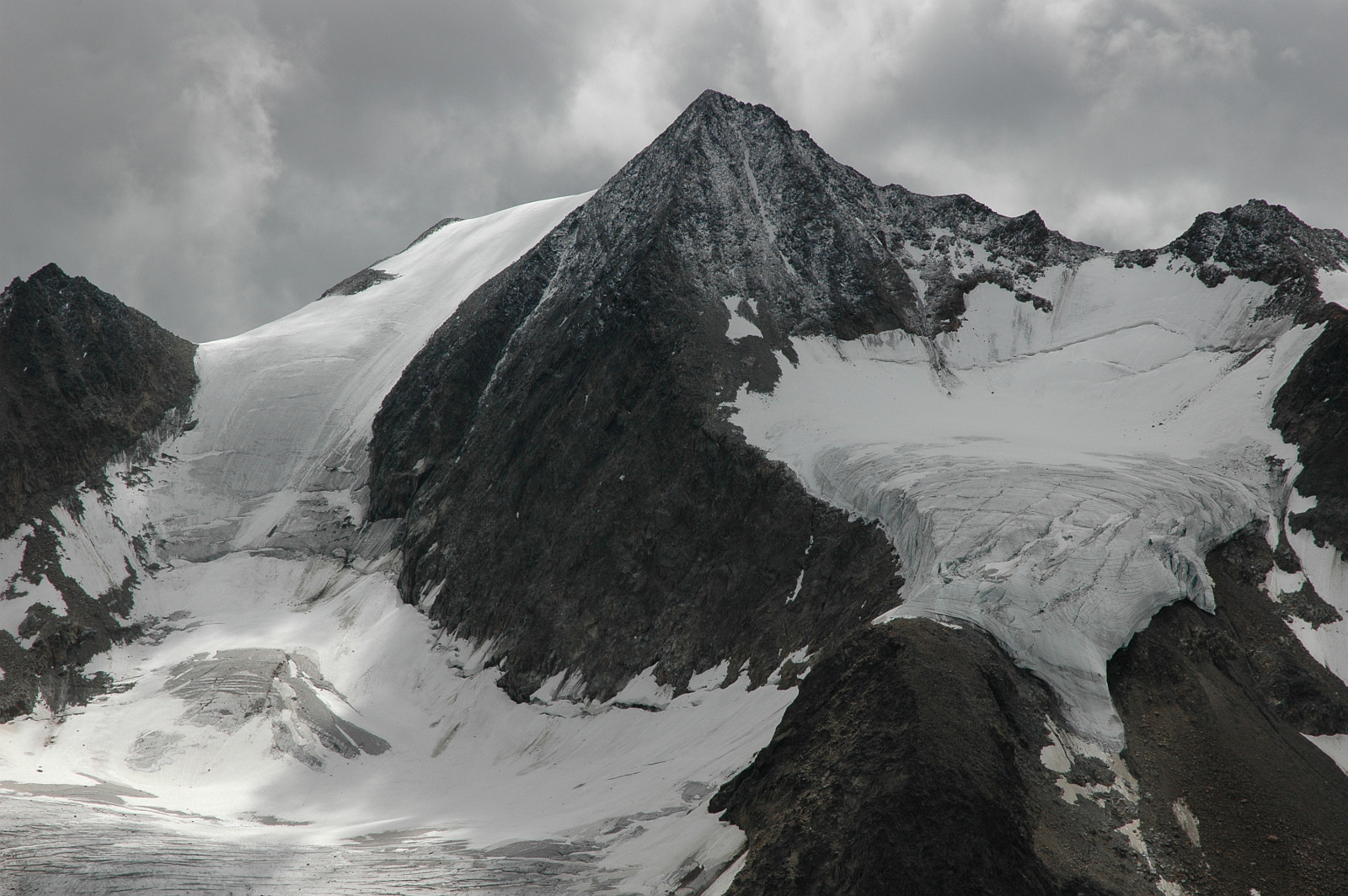
- The Östliche Seespitze from the northwest (Aperer Turm)

Highest point
- Elevation: 3,416 m (AA) (11,207 ft)
- Prominence: 185 m ↓ Hochmoosscharte
- Isolation: 1.2 km → Ruderhofspitze
- Coordinates: 47°02′58″N 11°09′06″E

Geography
- Location within Austria
- Location: Tyrol (Austria)
- Parent range: Stubai Alps

Climbing
- First ascent: 1863 by L. Barth and L. Pfaundler

The Östliche Seespitze is a mountain, 3,416 m (AA), in the Stubai Alps in Austria. It belongs to the Alpeiner Mountains (Alpeiner Berge) and is their second highest peak after the Ruderhofspitze. In addition, it is the highest point in the chain that runs northeast from the Westliche Seespitze, which separates the Falbesontal valley in the southeast from the Alpeiner Valley to the northwest.

The Alpeiner Kräulferner, a glacier on its north flank, gives the Östlichen Seespitze a much wilder appearance than from the south.

== Bases and ascents ==
The easiest ascents up the Östliche Seespitze run over glaciers and require the right equipment and experience. The normal route from the Neue Regensburger Hut takes about four hours to reach the summit. This route runs initially westwards over the Hochmoosferner glacier and then up the southwest flank to the summit, requiring block climbing of moderate difficulty (UIAA grade I). More difficult and one hour longer is the ascent from the Franz Senn Hut over the Alpeiner Kräulferner. The crossing to the Westliche Seespitze is difficult and, at one point, is assessed as UIAA grade III.

== Literature and maps ==
- Walter Klier, Stubaier Alpen, Alpine Club Guide, Munich, 2006, ISBN 3-7633-1271-4
- Alpine Club map 1:25,000 series, Sheet 31/1 Stubaier Alpen, Hochstubai
