= Unterperfuss =

- Municipality
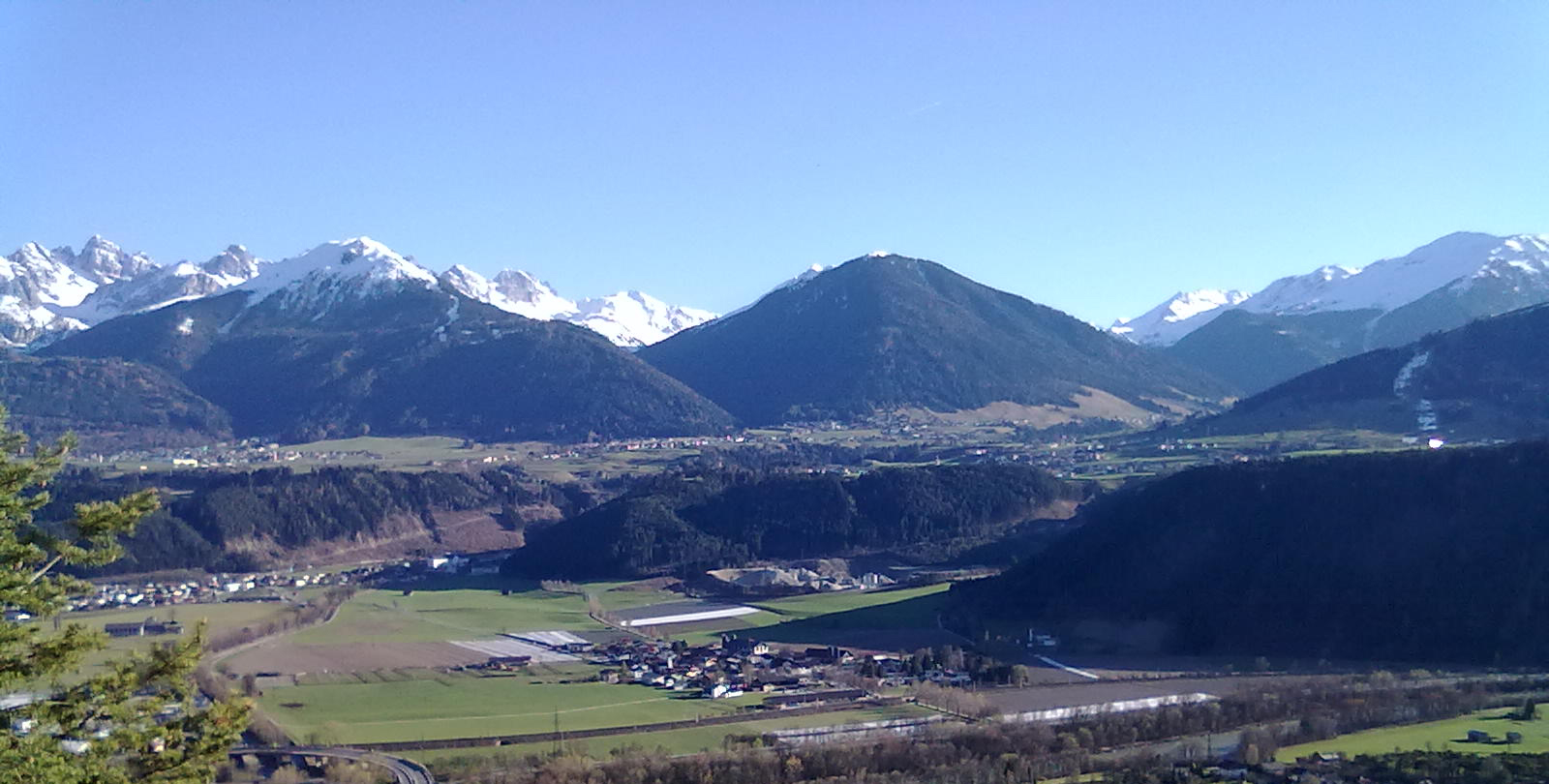

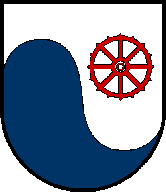
- Coat of arms

- Location within Austria
- Coordinates: 47°15′35″N 11°15′32″E
- Country: Austria
- State: Tyrol
- District: Innsbruck Land

Government
  - Mayor: Georg Hörtnagl

Area
  - Total: 2.24 km^{2} (0.86 sq mi)
- Elevation: 596 m (1,955 ft)

Population (2020)
  - Total: 222
  - Density: 99.1/km^{2} (257/sq mi)
- Time zone: UTC+1 (CET)
  - Summer (DST): UTC+2 (CEST)
- Postal code: 6175
- Area code: 05232
- Vehicle registration: IL

Unterperfuss is a municipality in the district of Innsbruck-Land in the Austrian state of Tyrol located 15 km west of Innsbruck and is one of the smallest villages of Tyrol. The area is restricted in the north by the Inn River and in the east by the Melach River. Unterperfuss has many facilities for horse-riding.

== Population ==
Historical population
Year	Pop.	±%
1869	97	—
1880	112	+15.5%
1890	101	−9.8%
1900	110	+8.9%
1910	129	+17.3%
1923	115	−10.9%
1934	125	+8.7%
1939	120	−4.0%
1951	348	+190.0%
1961	218	−37.4%
1971	215	−1.4%
1981	201	−6.5%
1991	223	+10.9%
2001	212	−4.9%
2011	198	−6.6%

== Geography ==
Unterperfuss is located in the Inn Valley, about 15 km west of Innsbruck, opposite Zirl. With an area of two square kilometers and about 200 inhabitants, it is one of the smallest municipalities in Tyrol. The municipal boundaries are formed in the north by the Inn River and in the east by the Melach River, which flows here from the Sellrain Valley.

== History ==
Unterperfuss became its own tax municipality in 1780. In the cadastre of that time, eleven houses are listed, ten of which were farms that were subject to the Stams monastery. There were also two mills and a sawmill. Forests are mentioned as community property, which were reserved for water protection structures on the Inn and Melach rivers. The family names at that time were Härtnagl, Mayr, Maizner, Wolf, Schiz, Hofer, Schaffenrath, Klaisner, Pranger and Fiz.
