= Innsbrucker Hut =

Building in Tyrol, Austria

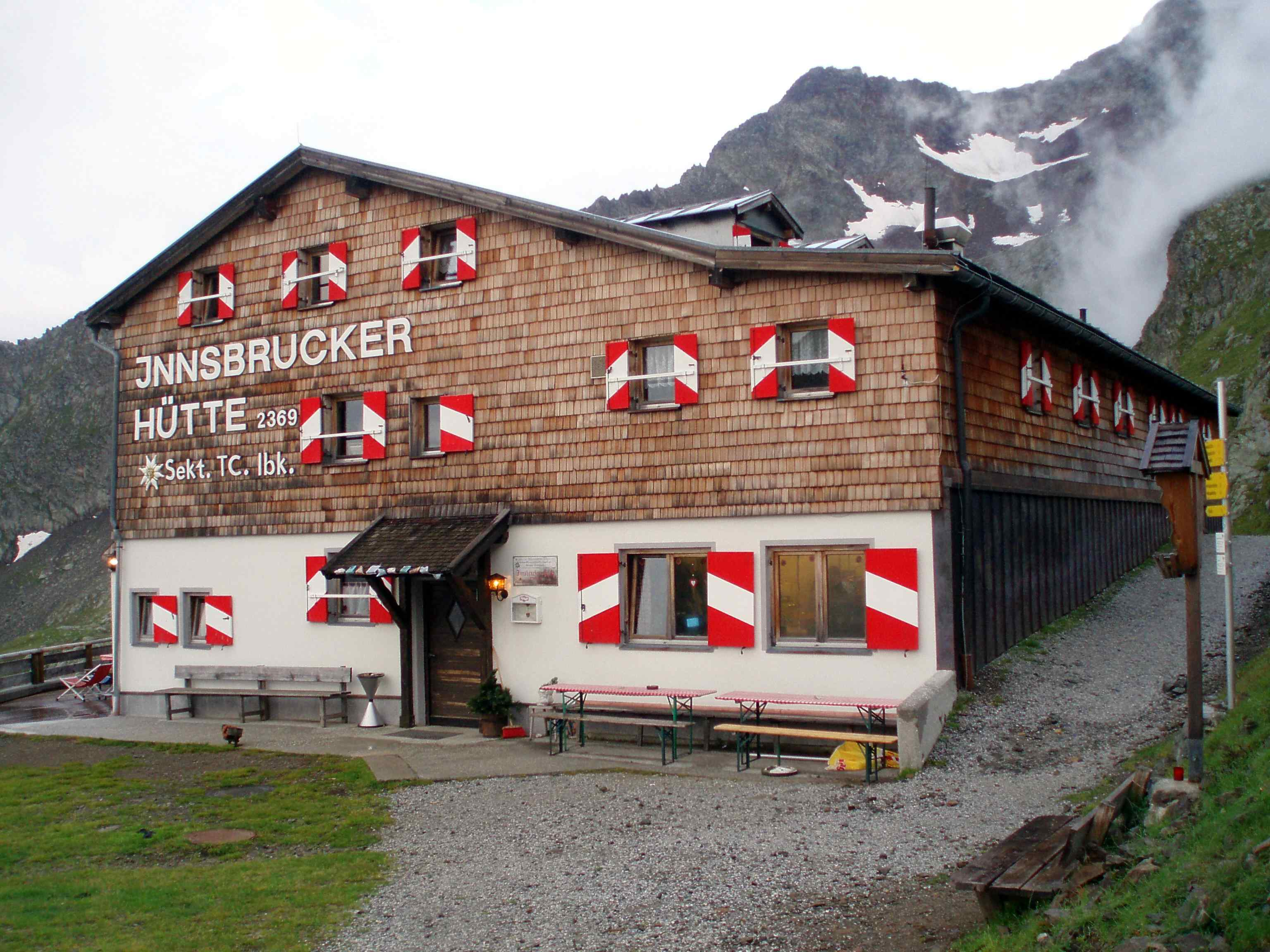
- The Innsbrucker Hut
- Interactive map of the Innsbrucker Hut area

General information
- Location: Hinteres Oberbergtal
- Coordinates: 47°2′35″N 11°18′38″E
- Elevation: 2,369 m (7,772 ft)
- Year built: 1884
- Owner: Innsbruck Section

Website
- www.innsbrucker-huette.at

The Innsbrucker Hut (German: Innsbrucker Hütte) is a mountain hut in the Stubai Alps at an altitude of 2,369 metres (7,772 ft) in the Gschnitz Valley, not far from the Pinnisjoch. It is managed by the Innsbruck Tourist Club section of the Austrian Alpine Club. The Innsbrucker Hütte is below the Habicht on the Stubai Hohenweg and is often visited.

== Access ==
The quickest route to the hut from the Gschnitz Valley is from the car park behind Gasthof Feuerstein (at 1,281 metres (4,203 ft)); this route takes about three hours and climbs over 1,000 metres (3,300 ft). An alternate route from Neder in the Stubai Valley (at 970 metres (3,180 ft)) through the Pinnis Valley takes approximately 4–5 hours and passes four former Alpine pastures, the Herzebenalm, Issenangeralm, Pinnisalm and Karalm. It is possible to take a taxi as far as the Karalm (at 1,747 metres (5,732 ft)).

== Further destinations ==
- The Bremer Hut is 6–7 hours from the Innsbrucker Hüttein 6 bis 7 Stunden
- The Elfer Hut is 3–4 hours away via the Pinnisjoch and the panorama path, or via the Elferspitze

== Summits ==
The following summits may be reached from the hut:

- Habicht (3,277 m), 3 hrs, difficult
- Glättespitze (3,133 m), 3.5 hrs, difficult
- Kalkwand (2,564 m), 1 hr, intermediate
- Ilmspitze (2,692 m) with medium-difficult klettersteig, 2.75 hrs, difficult (rated C/D)
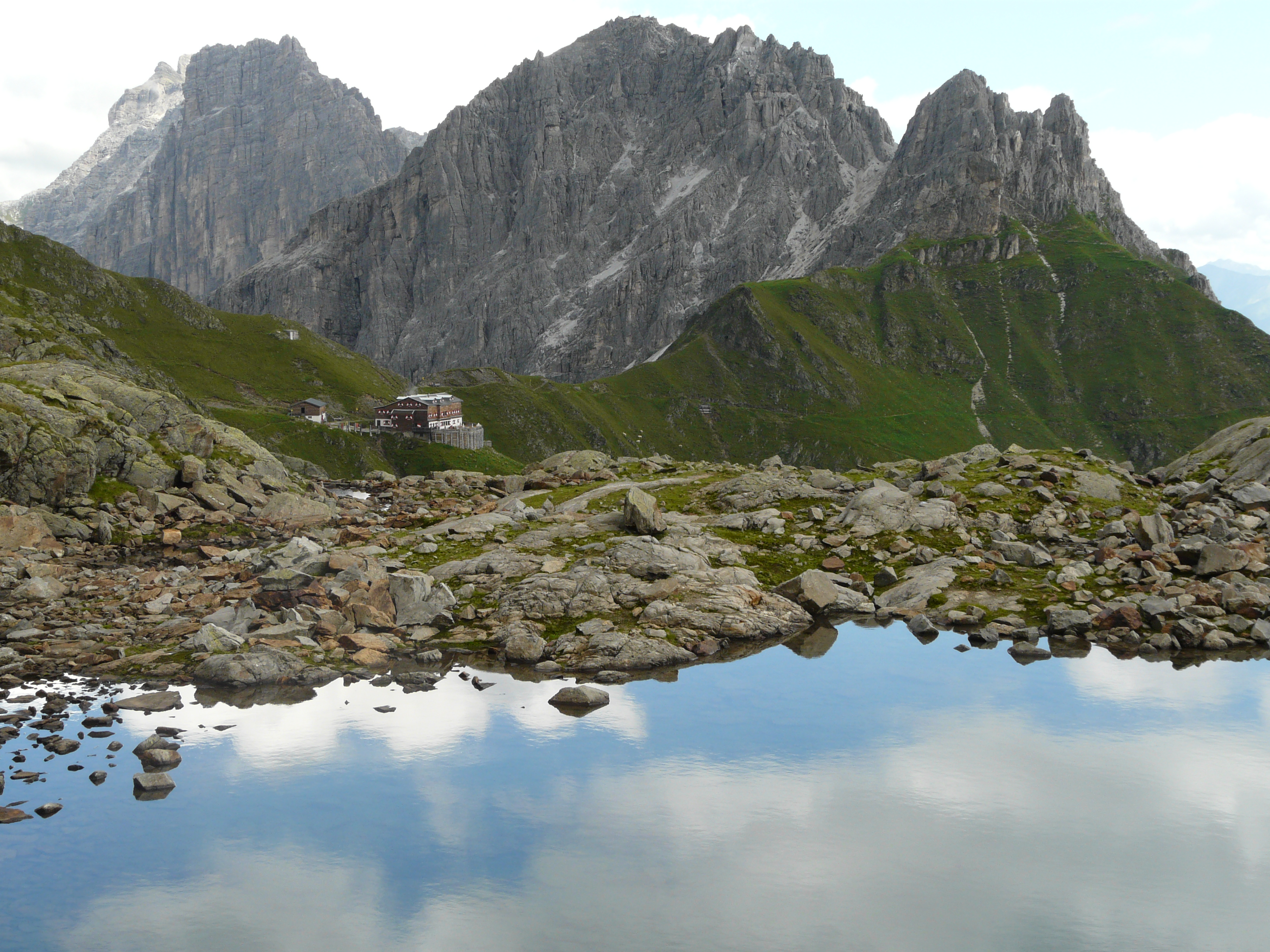
The Innsbrucker Hut with the Pinnisjoch and Kirchdachspitze behind

== Accommodation ==
The hut offers the following accommodation:

- 30 multi-bed room bedspaces
- 70 mattress bedspaces
