= Melach =

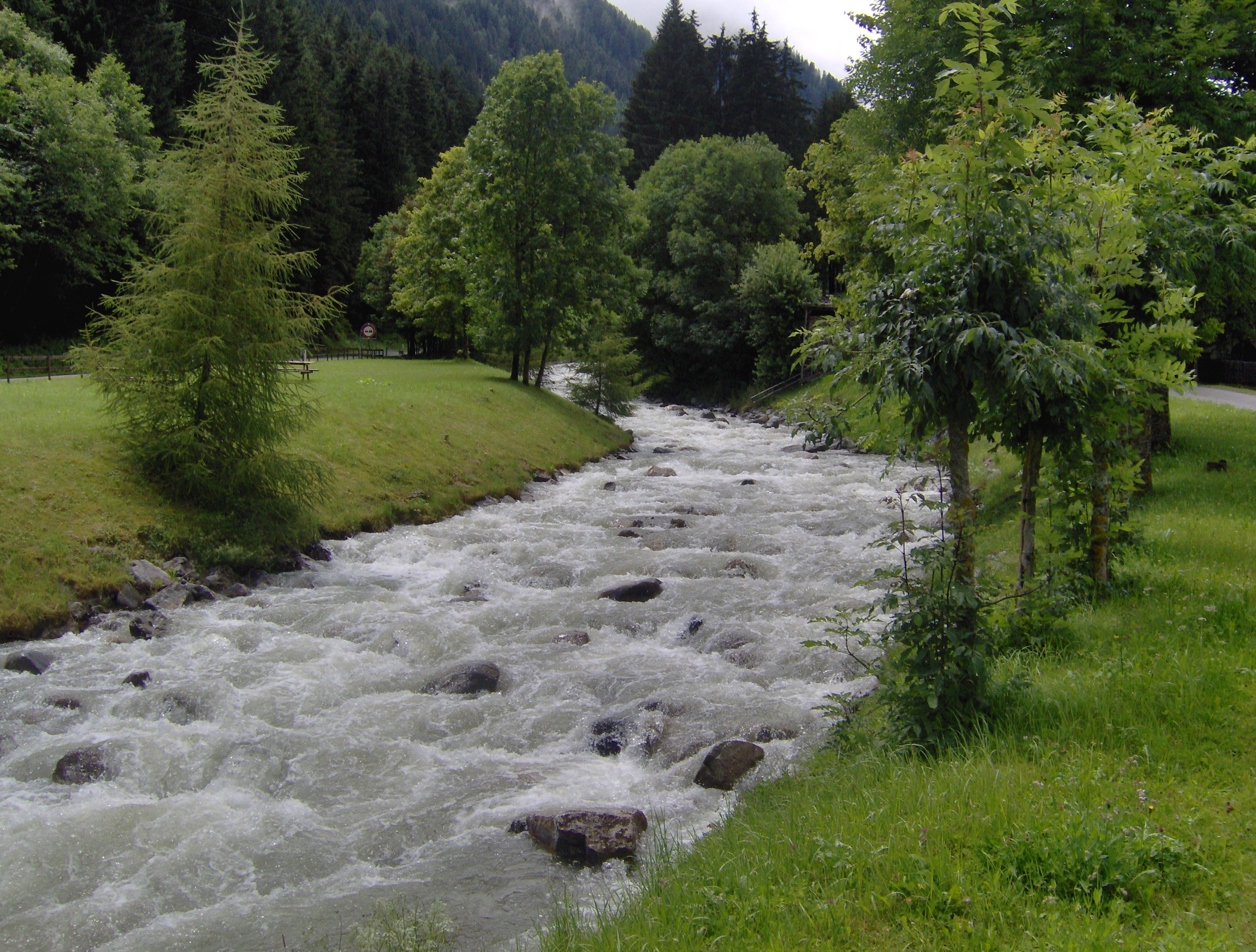
- The Melach in the valley Sellraintal

Location
- Country: Austria
- State: Tyrol

Physical characteristics
- Source
  - location: at the foot of the Lisenser Fernerkogel
- Mouth
  - location: Inn
  - coordinates: 47.2666°N 11.2619°E
- Length: 23.4 km (14.5 mi)

Basin features
- Progression: Inn→ Danube→ Black Sea

The Melach is a river of Tyrol, Austria, in the western part of the Innsbruck-Land District, a right tributary of the Inn.

The Melach has a length of 23.4 km (14.5 mi). It is formed by the confluence of several smaller streams at the foot of the Lisenser Fernerkogel. It passes through the villages of Gries and Sellrain and discharges into the Inn between Unterperfuss and Kematen.
