= Sellrain =

- Municipality
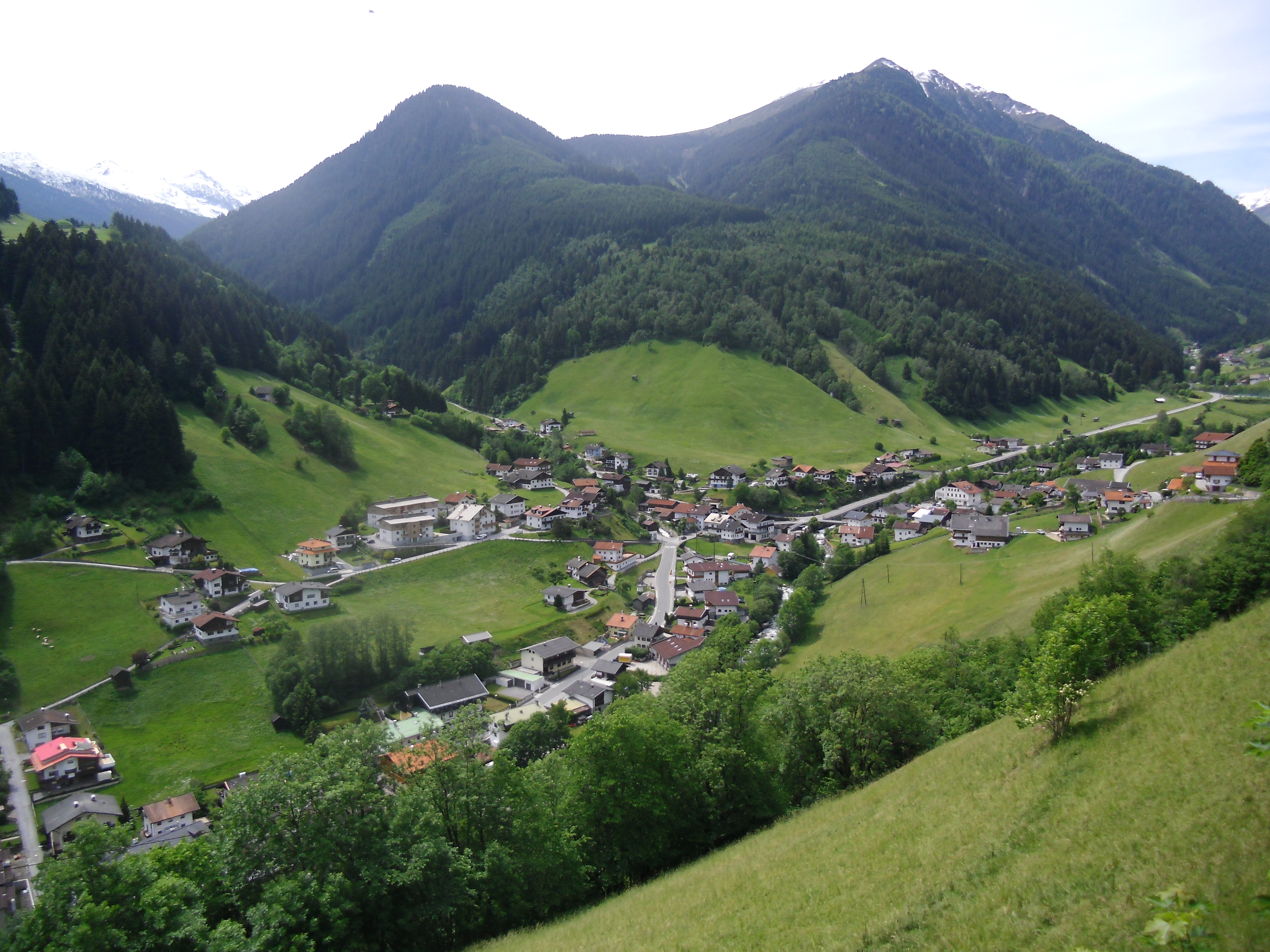
- View of Sellrain

- Coat of arms

- Location within Austria
- Coordinates: 47°12′48″N 11°12′50″E
- Country: Austria
- State: Tyrol
- District: Innsbruck Land

Government
  - Mayor: Benedikt Singer

Area
  - Total: 62 km^{2} (24 sq mi)
- Elevation: 909 m (2,982 ft)

Population (2020)
  - Total: 1,324
  - Density: 21/km^{2} (55/sq mi)
- Time zone: UTC+1 (CET)
  - Summer (DST): UTC+2 (CEST)
- Postal code: 6181
- Area code: 05230
- Vehicle registration: IL
- Website: www.sellrain.tirol.gv.at

Sellrain is a municipality in the district of Innsbruck-Land in the Austrian state of Tyrol located 14.40 km (8.95 mi) southwest of Innsbruck in the Sellrain Valley. The River Melach and its tributary the Fotscherbach flow through it. Most inhabitants are farmers and also have another job in the neighboring Innsbruck. There are two Catholic churches in the village St. Quirin and St. Anna. They are both over 300 years old.

== Population ==
Historical population
Year	Pop.	±%
1869	779	—
1880	712	−8.6%
1890	716	+0.6%
1900	719	+0.4%
1910	744	+3.5%
1923	728	−2.2%
1934	875	+20.2%
1939	879	+0.5%
1951	947	+7.7%
1961	1,069	+12.9%
1971	1,157	+8.2%
1981	1,189	+2.8%
1991	1,268	+6.6%
2001	1,362	+7.4%
2011	1,338	−1.8%

== History ==
The first settlement developed around the ferruginous healing spring Rothenbrunn, which was used by Innsbruck nobles and citizens since the Middle Ages. The place name is first mentioned in a document dated 1271 as Selrain. The origin of the name is disputed. It may be based on the ancient field name *selia ('Sennhütte'). In any case, the name is pre-Roman.
