= Franz Senn Hut =

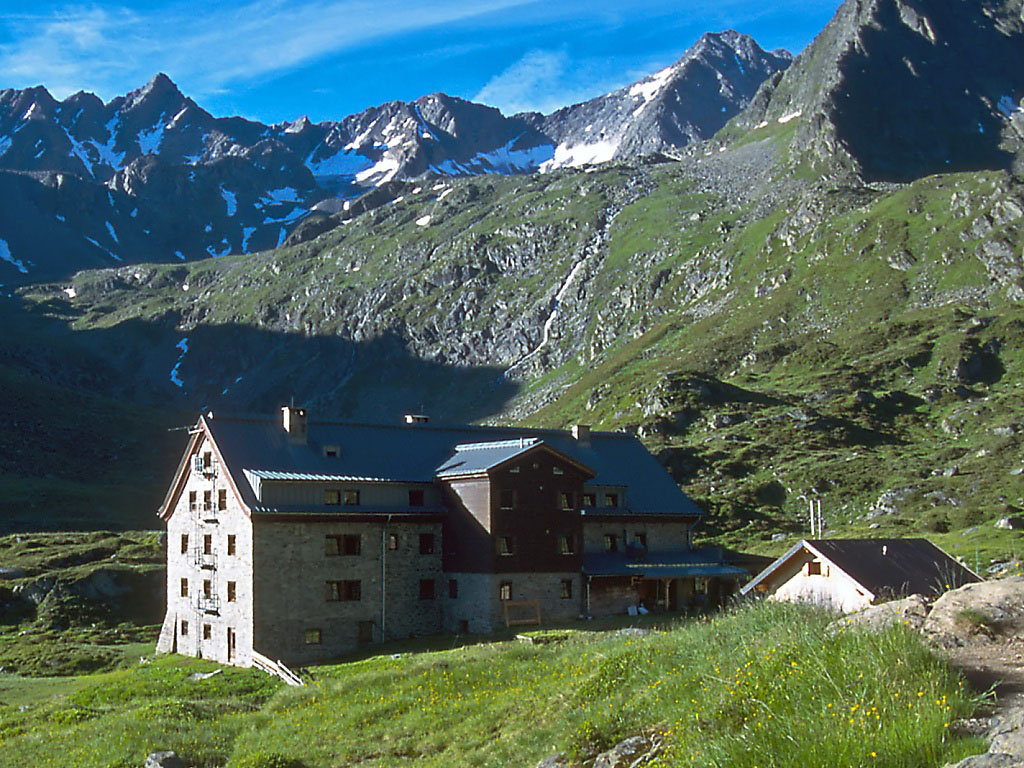
- The Franz Senn Hut
- Interactive map of the Franz Senn Hut area

General information
- Location: Hinteres Oberbergtal
- Coordinates: 47.085°N 11.16889°E
- Elevation: 2,147 m (7,044 ft)
- Year built: 1885
- Owner: Innsbruck Section

Website
- www.franzsennhuette.at

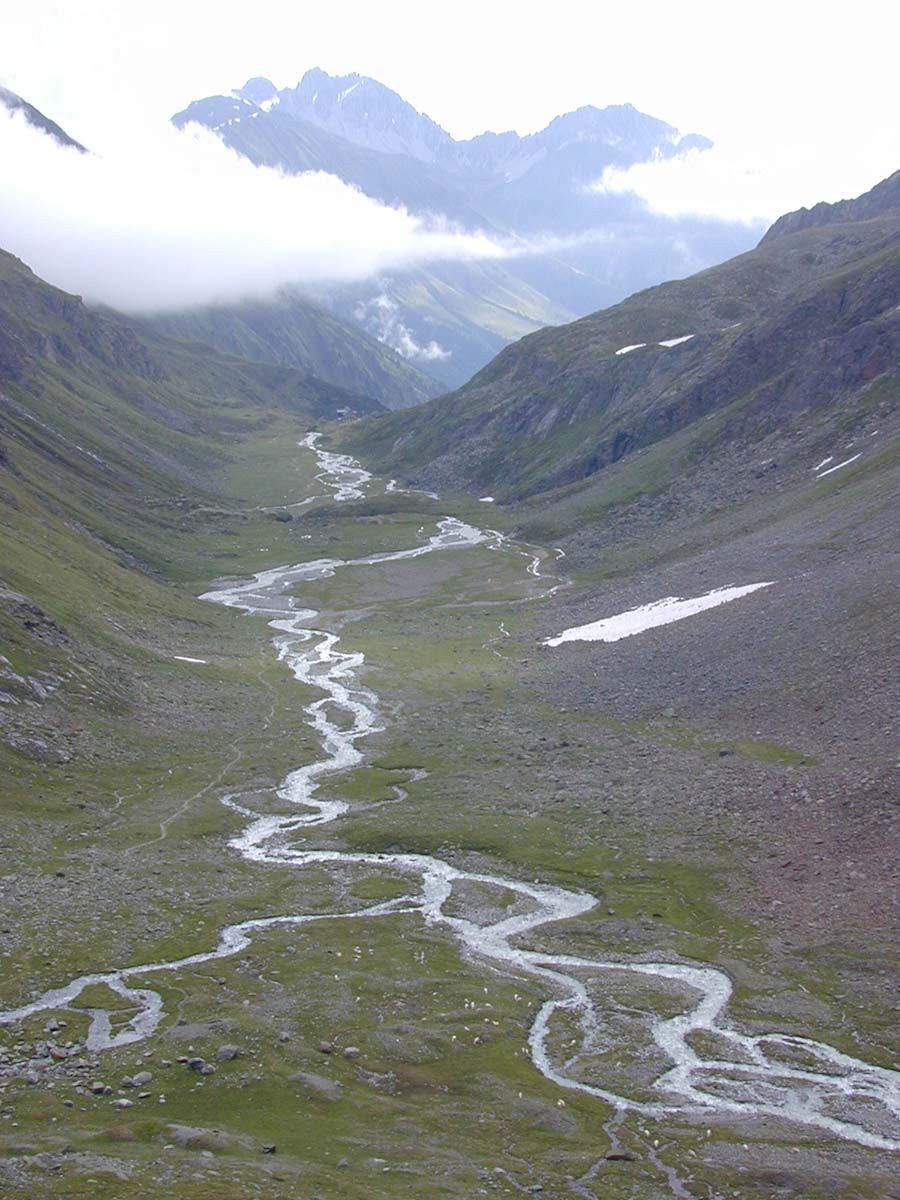
View down valley to the hut

The Franz Senn Hut (German: Franz-Senn-Hütte) is a large and very popular Category I alpine hut in the Stubai Alps owned by the Austrian Alpine Club (Österreichischer Alpenverein). It is a large, well-appointed hut, named after Franz Senn. Access is from Oberiss in the Oberbergtal off the Stubaital above Neustift.

== History ==
The Franz Senn Hut was opened on 15 September 1885 having cost 3,000 florins. At the time it had accommodation for 37 people including 4 women. It was extended in 1907/08 to 20 beds and 60 shakedowns and again in 1932/33 to 80 beds and 80 sleeping places. During the Second World War a goods cableway was erected. In 1960 the hut's capacity was increased to 220.

The hut was named after a mountaineering pastor.

== Access ==
- By train: to Innsbruck from there to Fulpmes (on the Stubai Valley railway) and from there by bus
- By bus: to Neustift im Stubaital, village of Milders
- By car: to Neustift im Stubaital

== Ascent ==
- Neustift im Stubaital (1154 metre climb, duration: c. 4½ hours)
- Oberiss Alm (402 metre climb, duration: c. 1½ hours)

== Summits accessible from the Franz Senn Hut ==
- Ruderhofspitze (3,474 m), height difference 1327 m, duration c. 5 hours, high tour)
- Lisenerspitze (3,230 m, height difference 1080 m, duration c. 3.5 hours, glacier tour)
- Lisenser Fernerkogel (3,266 m, height difference 1150 m, duration c. 4.5 hours, glacier tour)
- Schafgrübler (2,921 m, height difference 780 m, duration c. 3 hours)
- Rinnenspitze (3,003 m, height difference 850 m, duration 2.5 to 3 hours, sections of the summit ridge are secured)
- Östliche Seespitze (3,416 m), popular but challenging ski tour
- Westliche Seespitze (3,355 m)
- Wildes Hinterbergl, (3,288 m), much frequented ski tour

== Transits ==
The hut is on the Stubai Hohenweg, an 8-day high level trail around the Stubai; neighbouring huts on the trail are the Starkenburger Hut and the New Regensburg Hut.

=== Huts ===
- Amberger Hut (2,135 m, duration: c. 6 hours)
- Neue Regensburger Hut (2,286 m, duration: c. 4 hours auf dem Stubaier Höhenweg)
- Starkenburger Hut (2,237 m, duration: c. 7 hours auf dem Stubaier Höhenweg
- Adolf Pichler Hut (1,977 m, duration: c. 7 hours)
- Westfalenhaus (2,273 m, duration: c. 6 hours)
- Potsdamer Hut (2,020 m, duration: 5–7 hours)

=== Places ===
- Neustift im Stubaital (993 m, duration: c. 4½ hours)

== See also ==
- Pic of the hut at dusk
- Pic up valley
