= Schrankogel =

Mountain in Austria

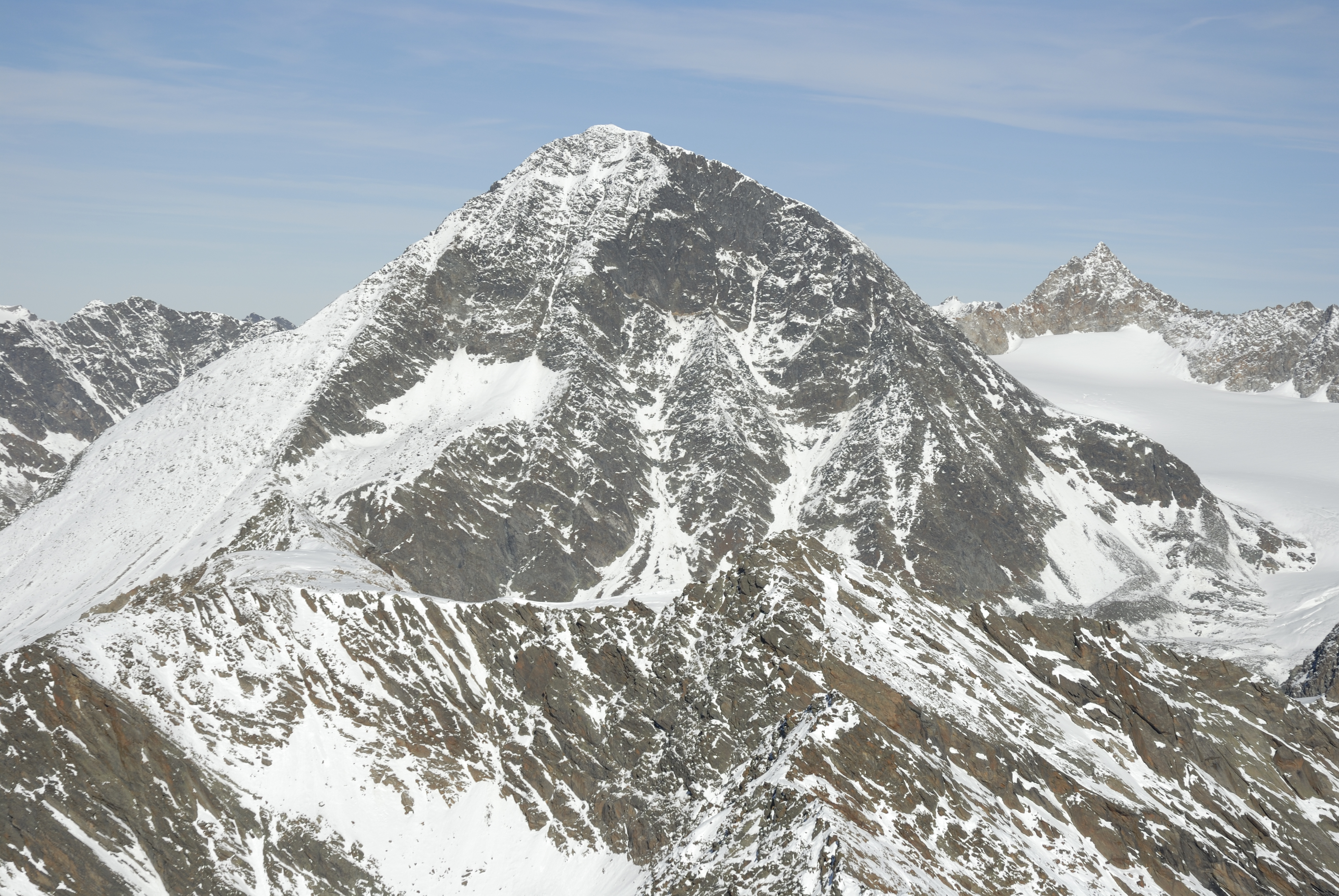
- Schrankogel (centre) and Schrandele (right) with the Schwarzenbergferner glacier seen from the south (Hinterer Daunkopf)

Highest point
- Elevation: 3,497 m (AA) (11,473 ft)
- Prominence: 3,497-2,950 m ↓ Notch between the Schrankogel and the Hinterer Daunkopf
- Isolation: 9.7 km → Zuckerhütl
- Listing: Alpine mountains above 3000 m
- Coordinates: 47°02′41″N 11°05′57″E

Geography
- Location within Austria
- Location: Tyirol, Austria
- Parent range: Stubai Alps

Climbing
- First ascent: around 1840 by Pastor Schöpf from Gries im Sulztal along the western arête
- Normal route: Gries – Amberger Hut – Hohes Egg - Schrankogel

The Schrankogel, 3,497 m tall (called the Schrankogl on the AV map) is the second highest mountain in the Stubai Alps. The northeast side of the Schrankogel is steep and snowy; from all other sides the Schrankogel has a rocky character.

== Gallery ==
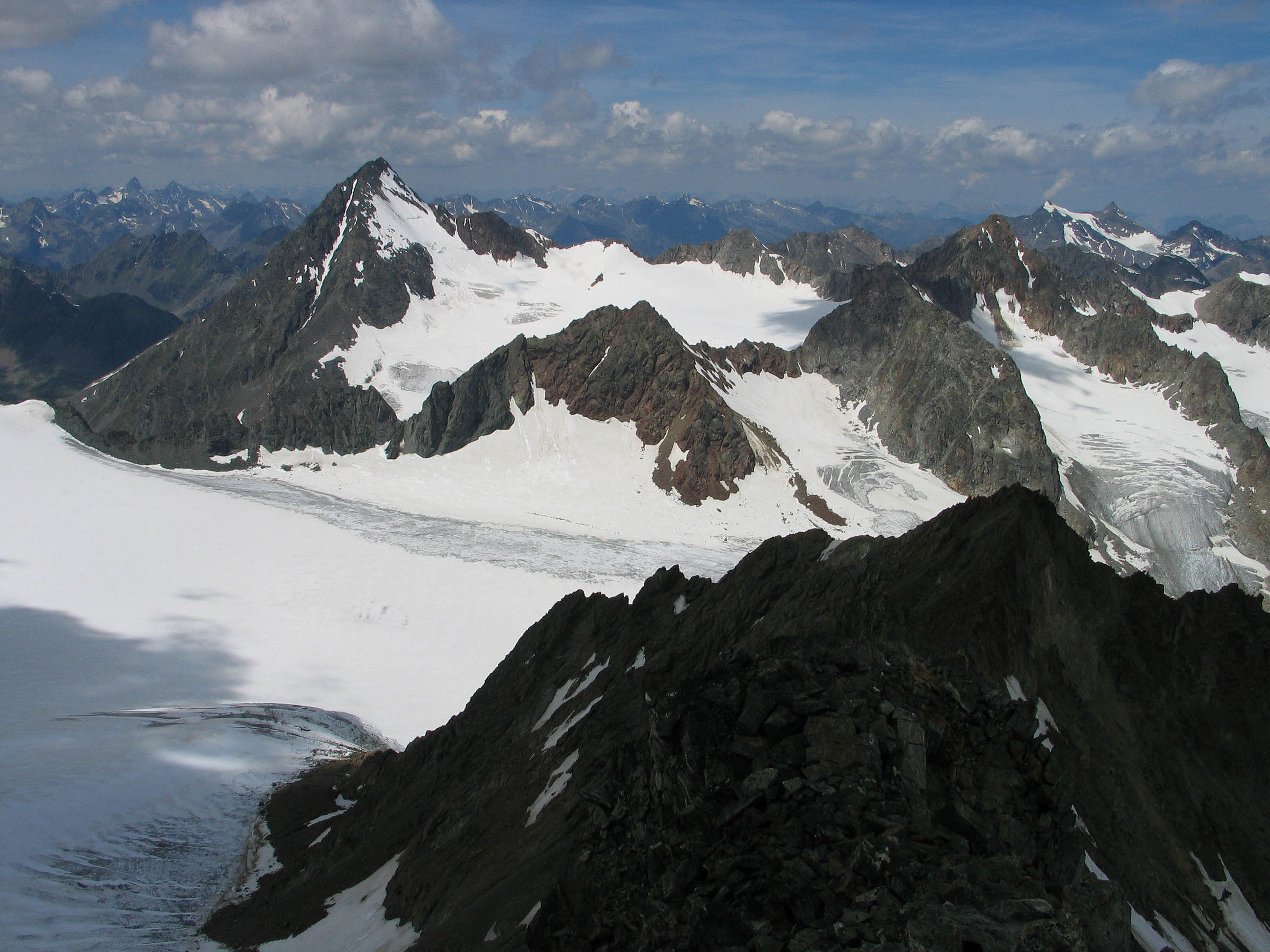
The Schrankogel (left) seen from the Ruderhofspitze, the formerly entirely firn-covered north flank is becoming increasingly snow-free

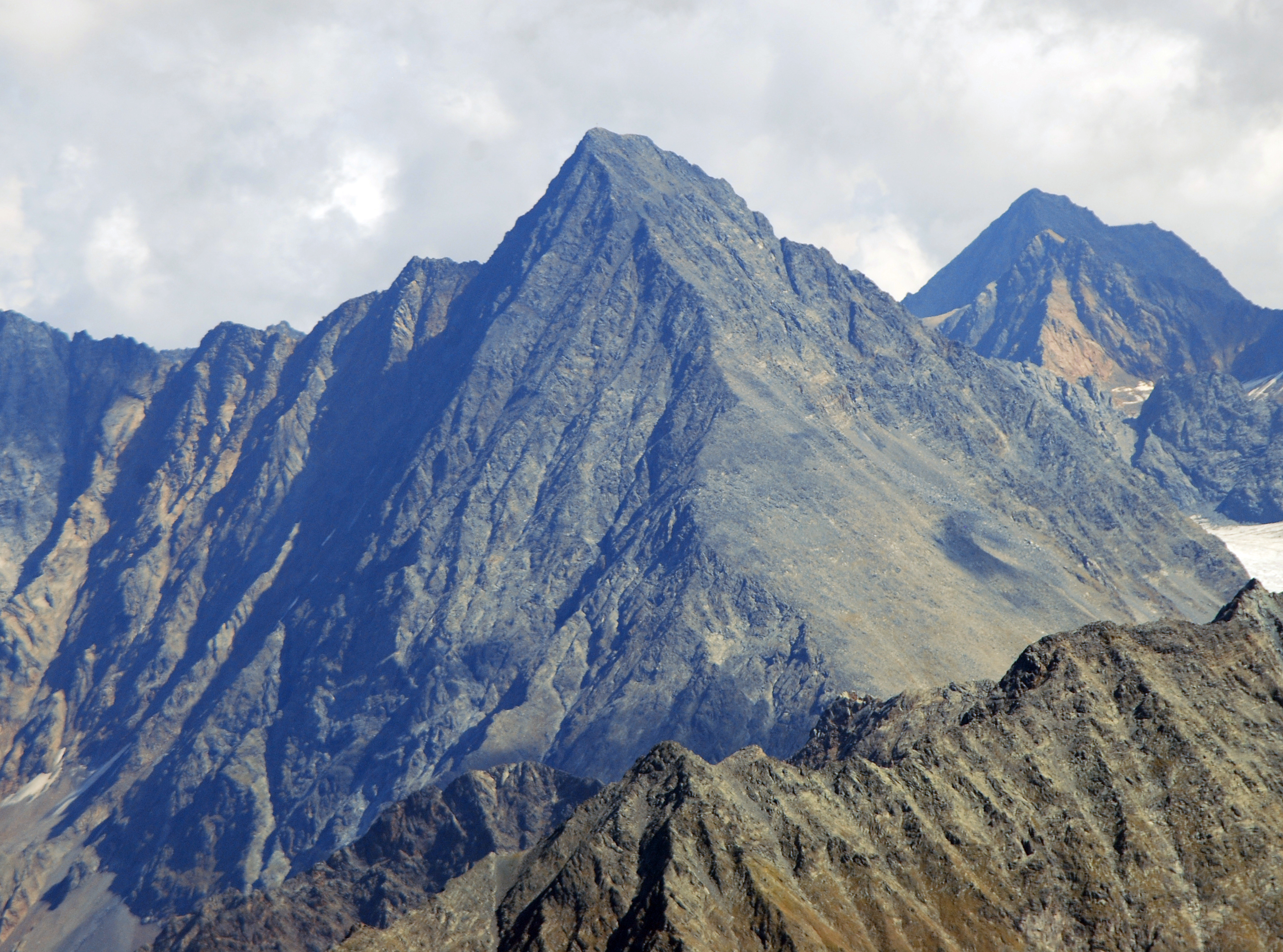
The Schrankogel from the west (Hohe Geige)
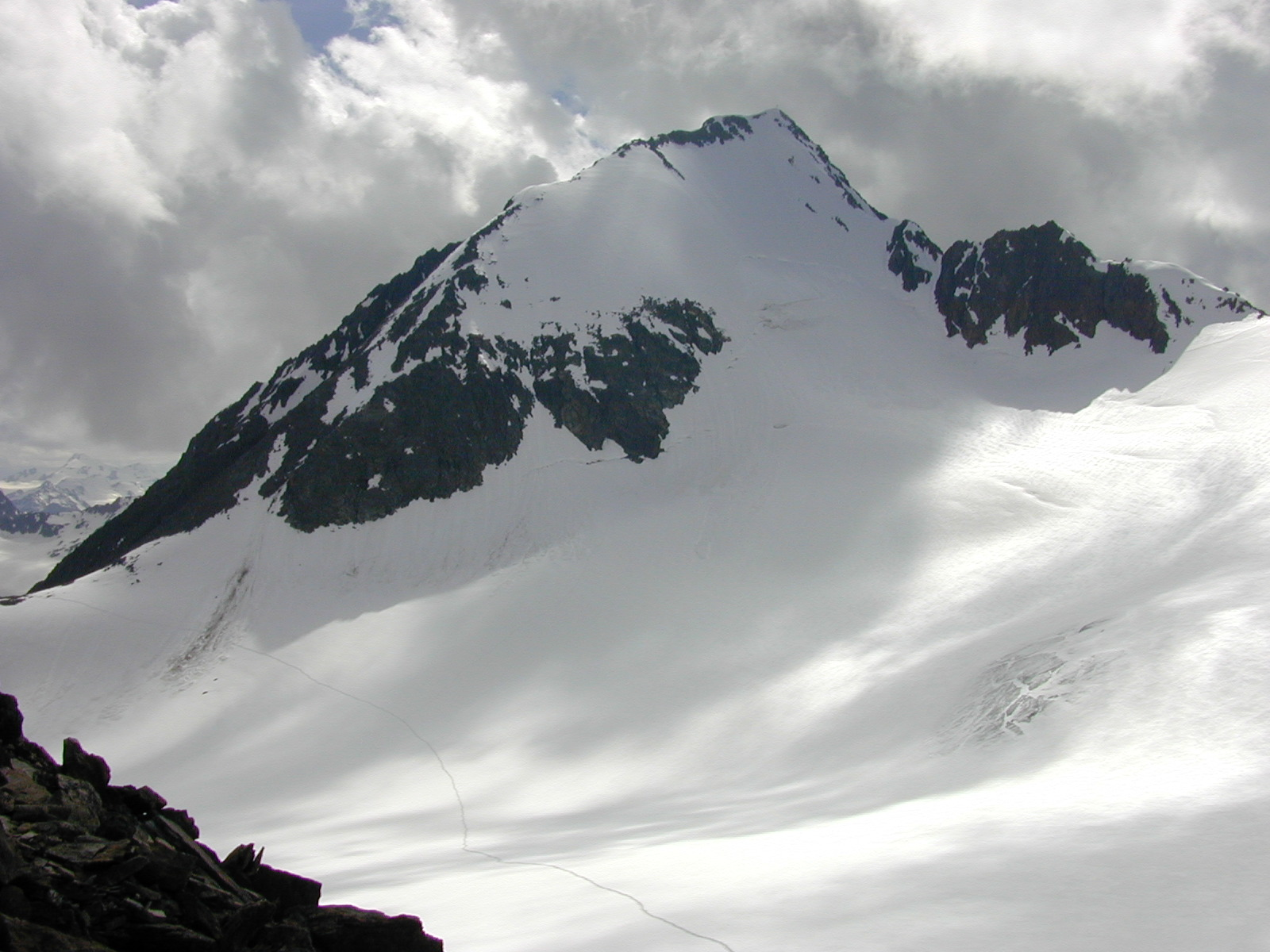
View looking WSW from the Wildgrat Scharta, showing the Northeast face and the East ridge

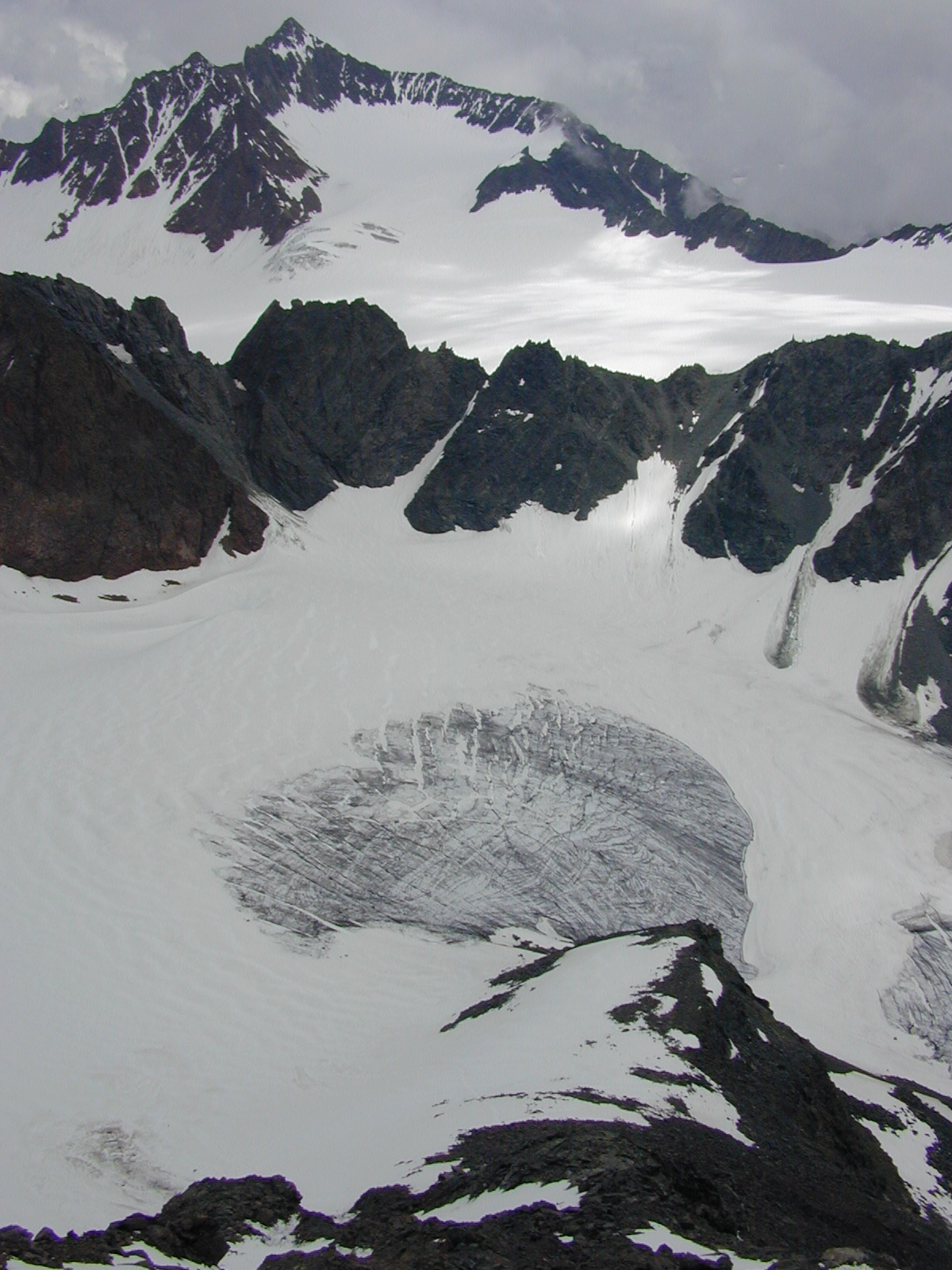
View from halfway up the eastern arête leading to the Ruderhofspitze
