= Lisenser Spitze =

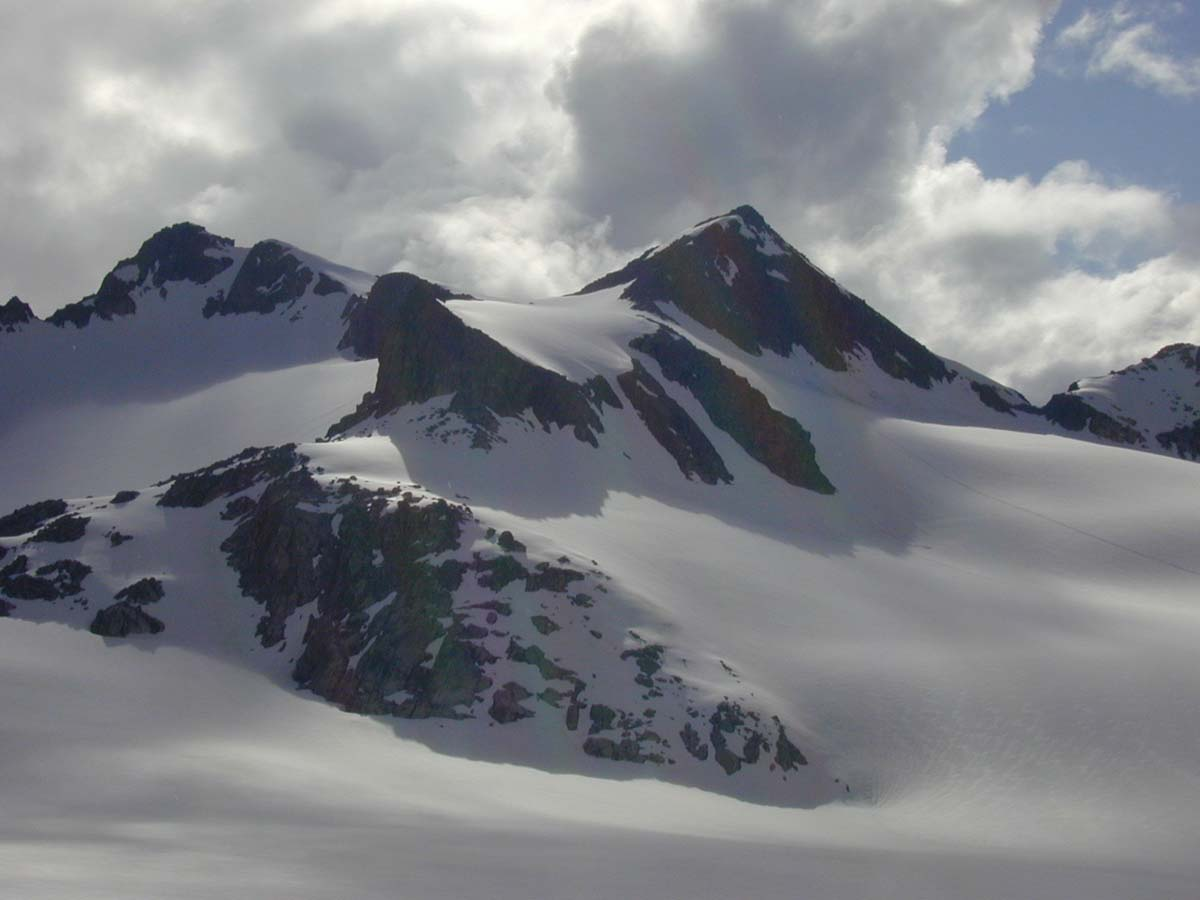
- Lisenser Spitze (slightly R of center), July 2001

Highest point
- Elevation: 3,230 m (10,600 ft)
- Coordinates: 47°05′N 11°06′E

Geography
- Location: Tyrol, Austria
- Parent range: Stubai Alps

The Lisenser Spitze (3230 m) is a mountain in the Stubai Alps of Austria.
