= Ruderhofspitze =

Mountain in Austria

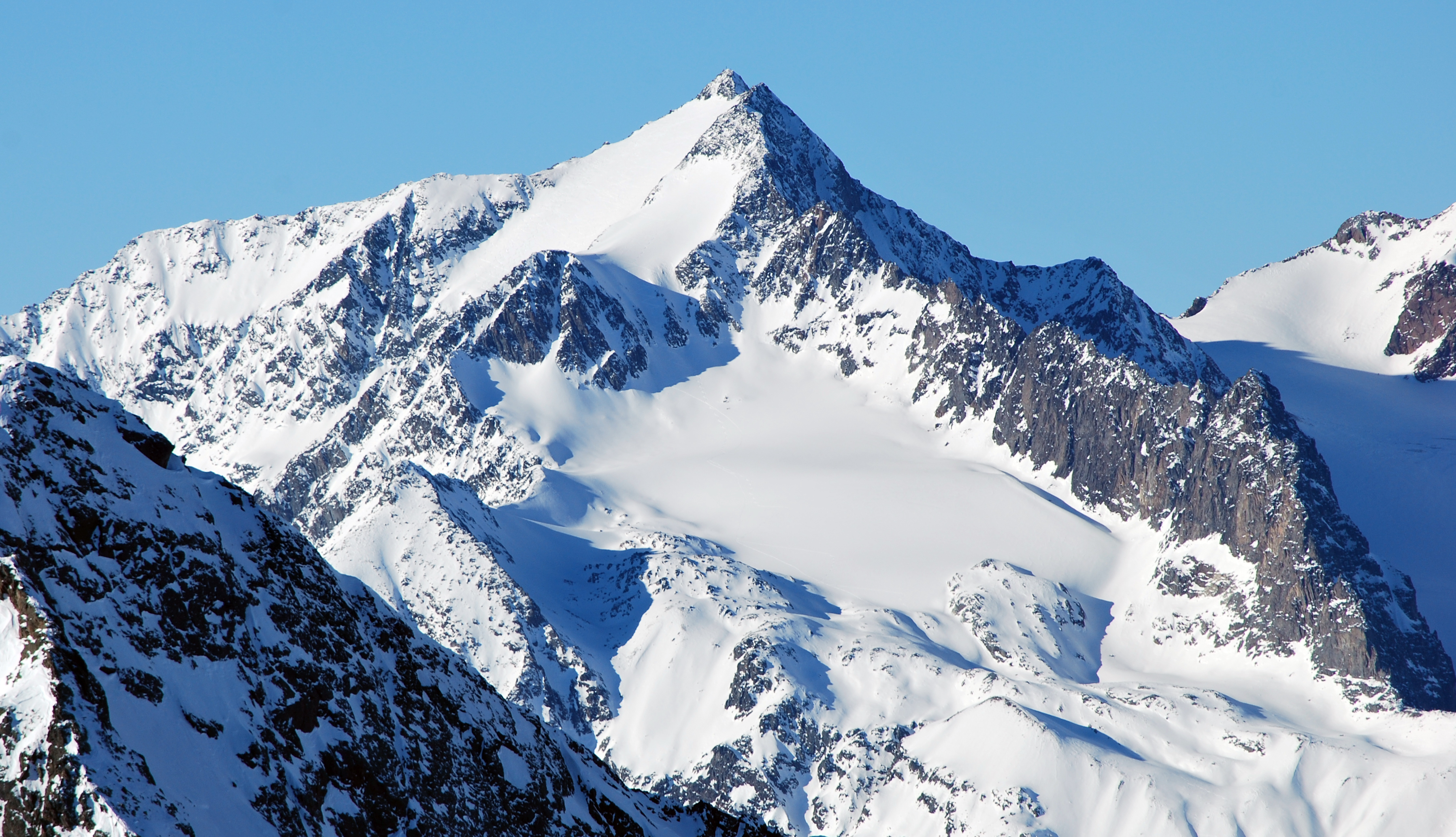
- The Ruderhofspitze from the southeast

Highest point
- Elevation: 3,474 m (AA) (11,398 ft)
- Prominence: 368 m ↓ Schwarzenbergjoch
- Isolation: 3.4 km → Schrankogel
- Listing: Alpine mountains above 3000 m
- Coordinates: 47°02′25″N 11°08′37″E

Geography
- Location within Austria
- Location: Tyrol, Austria
- Parent range: Stubai Alps

Geology
- Rock type: amphibolite-biotite gneiss

Climbing
- First ascent: 30 August 1864 by Karl Baedeker, junior (son of Karl Baedeker), Anton von Ruthner, guided by Pankraz Gleinser and Alois Tanzer
- Normal route: Neustift im Stubaital – Oberissalm – Franz Senn Hut – Ruderhofspitze

At 3,474 m (AA) the Ruderhofspitze is the fourth highest mountain in the Stubai Alps in Austria. It is part of the Alpein Mountains (Alpeiner Berge) and lies in the Austrian state of Tyrol. As a result of its topographic isolation and good all-round views it is one of the most visited mountains in the Stubai. An almost two-kilometre-long arête, the Grawawand, runs away from the summit to the east. Less prominent ridges run south and northwestwards from the Ruderhofspitze. The peak was first ascended on 30 August 1864 by Karl Baedeker (the son of Karl Baedeker), Anton von Ruthner and mountain guides Pankraz Gleinser and Alois Tanzer.

== Location and surrounding area ==
The Ruderhofspitze lies a good six kilometres as the crow flies west of Ranalt in the Stubai valley and about ten kilometres east of Gries, a village in the municipality of Längenfeld in the Sulztal valley. The mountain is surrounded by glaciers. To the southeast, below the Grawawand is the Grawawandferner glacier, to the south the Ruderhofferner, to the west the expansive Alpeiner Ferner and to the north the Hochmoosferner runs right up to just under the summit cross on the Ruderhofspitze. Its neighbouring peaks are: to the north and separated by the Hochmoosscharte notch (3,231 m), the Westliche Seespitze (3,355 m) and along the Grawawand, separated by the crossing of Grawagrubennieder (2,880 m), the Nockwand (3,091 m). To the south, down to the Mutterbergalm in the Stubai valley there are no summits. To the west, separated by the Alpeiner Ferner glacier, is the mightiest mountain of the group, the 3,496-metre-high Schrankogel.

== Bases and routes ==
The route used by the first climbers to ascend the Ruderhofspitez in 1864 led from the Oberissalm in the Oberbergtal valley to the Alpeiner Ferner. There, because the Schrankogel appeared too difficult, they decided to make the Ruderhofspitze the goal of their trek. After over eight hours they reached the summit. The present normal route, the easiest ascent, runs in a great arc over the Alpeiner Ferner as a high mountain tour to the Ruderhofspitze and should only be undertake with the right equipment and knowledge. The base for this route is the Franz Senn Hut situated to the northeast of the mountain at an elevation of 2,147 metres. From the hut the tour heads in a southwesterly direction along the Alpeiner Bach to the Alpeiner Ferner and then over the heavily crevassed glacier initially heading south and then east into the bay of the glacier below the Ruderhofspitze. From here there are two options to get to the firn field on the south side below the summit: one leads across the steep WSW flank on fixed ropes (negotiating the bergschrund with a risk of rockfalls) or the somewhat longer, but easier route along the long SSW arête from the upper Hölltalscharte notch. The route runs across the firn field on the south side to the rocky summit block and finally up an easy climb to the highest point. About an hour shorter, but not easier, is the ascent from the New Regensburg Hut along the Grawagrubennieder and the Grawawandferner. Other routes to the Ruderhofspitze run from the Mutterbergalm and the Dresdner Hut (a six-hour ice tour) to the Ruderhofspitze.

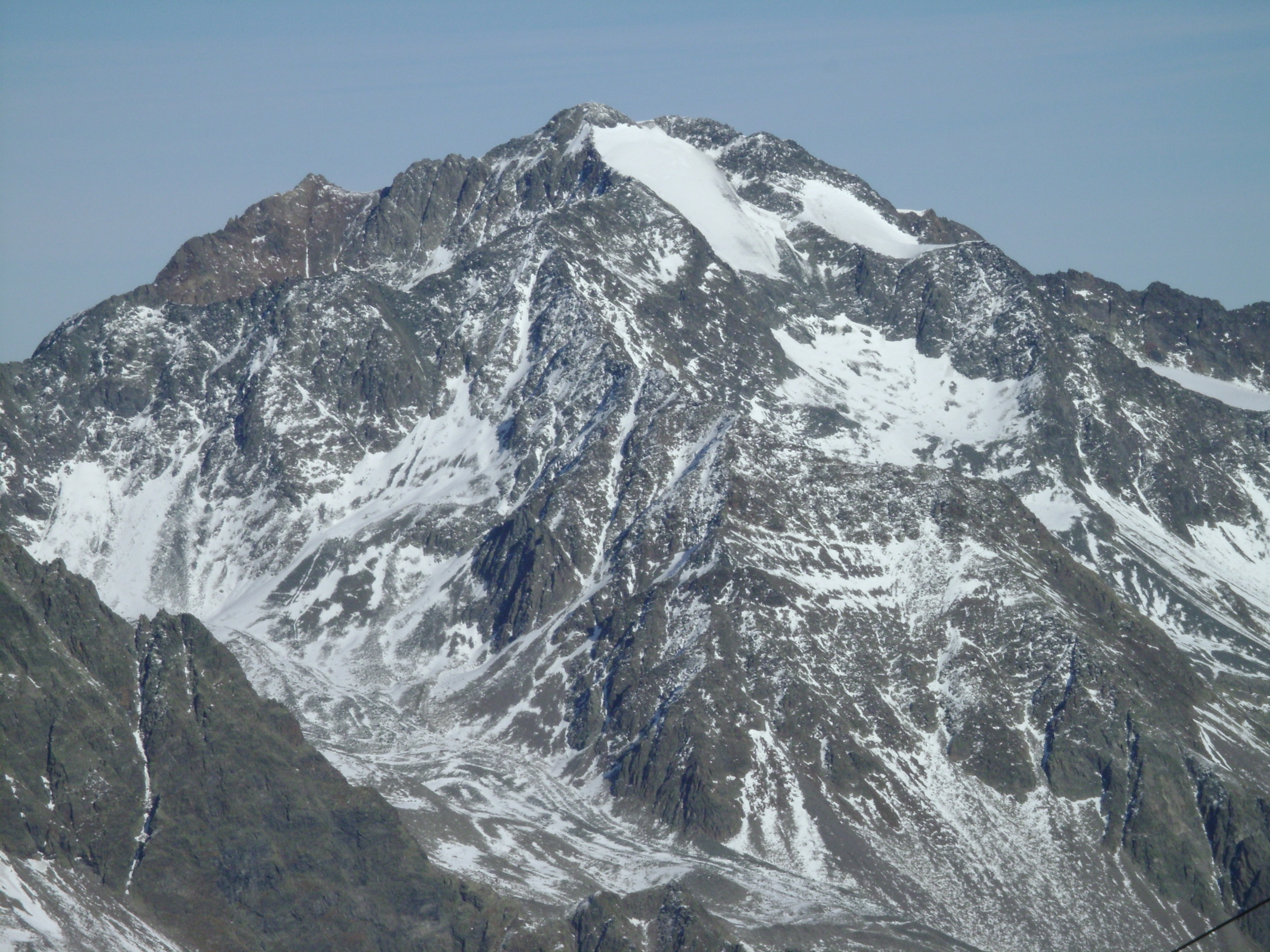
From the southwest (Stubai Glacier)

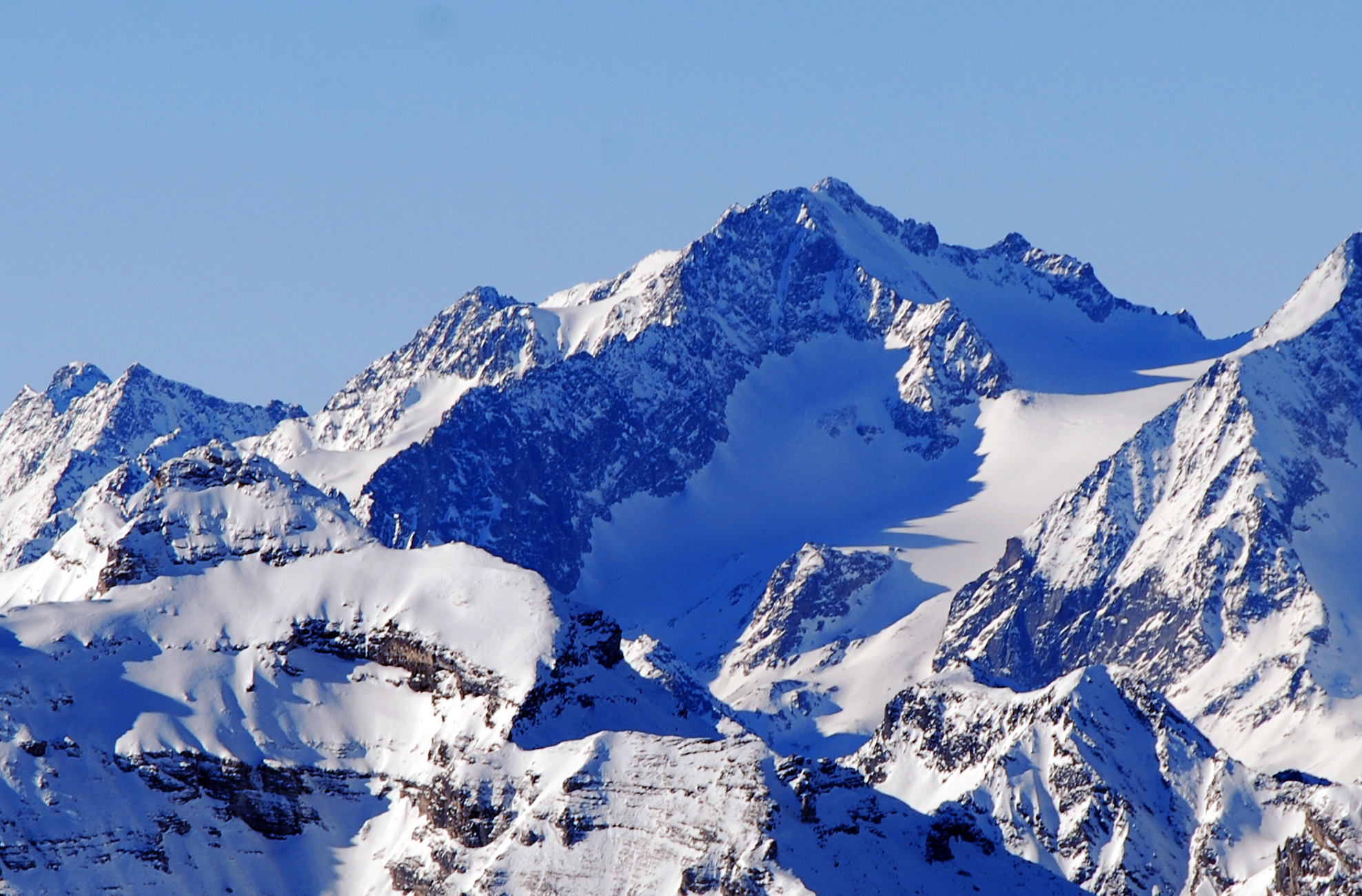
From the east

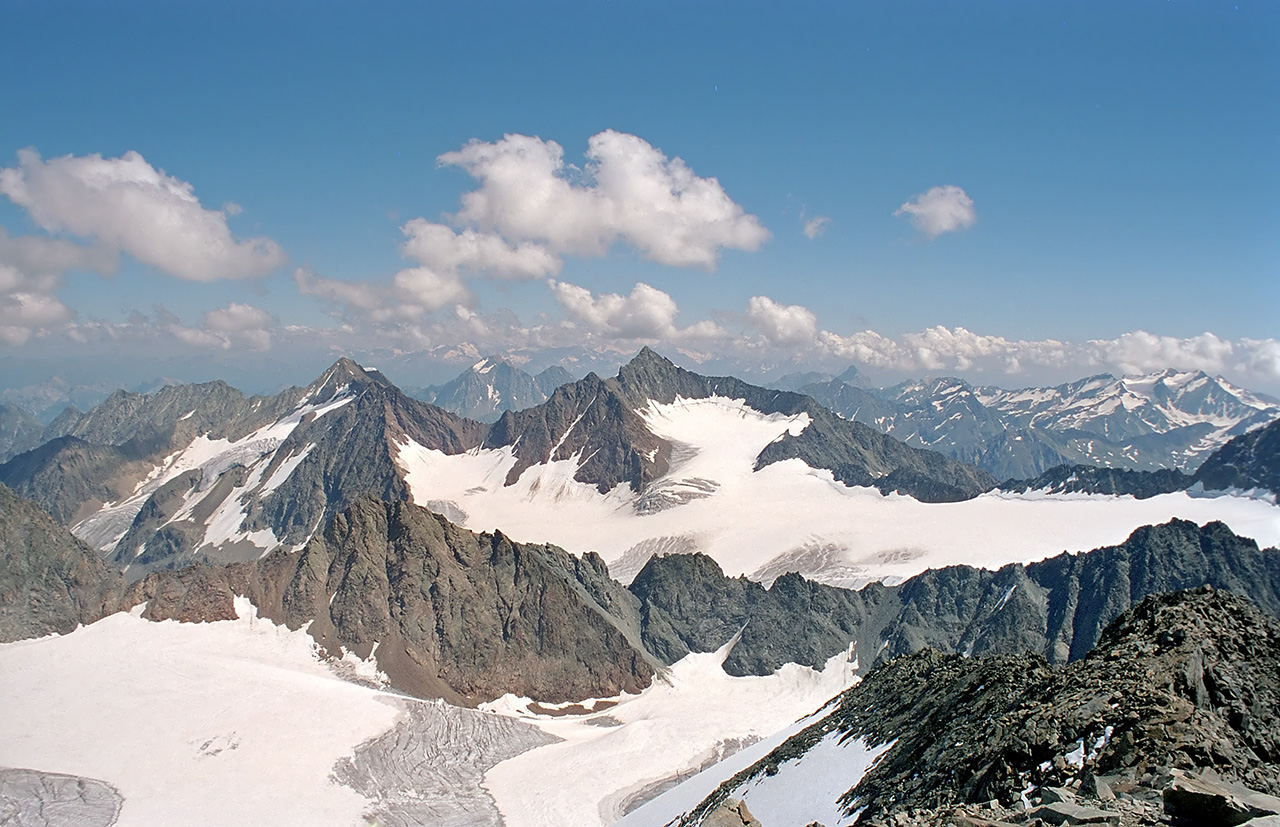
From the west (Schrankogel)

== Literature and maps ==
- Walter Klier, Alpine Club Guide Stubaier Alpen, Bergverlag Rother, Munich, 2006, ISBN 3-7633-1271-4
- Eduard Richter: Die Erschließung der Ostalpen, II. Band, Berlin, Verlag des Deutschen und Oesterreichischen Alpenvereins, 1894
- Alpine Club map 1:25,000 series, Sheet 31/1, Stubaier Alpen, Hochstubai
