= Rosskogel =

Rosskogel or Roßkogel may refer to the following mountains:

- Zwieselbacher Rosskogel (3,081 m) and Gleirscher Rosskogel (2,994 m), Stubai Alps
- Roßkogel (Stubai Alps), 2,646 m, near Gries in the Sellrain valley, Stubai Alps
- Rosskogel (Rofan), 1,940 m, near Kramsach, Rofan
- Roßkogel (Mürzsteg Alps, near Mürzzuschlag), 1,479 m, near Mürzzuschlag in the Mürz valley, Mürzsteg Alps
- Roßkogel (Mürzsteg Alps, near St. Marein), 1,374 m, near St. Marein in the Mürz valley, Mürzsteg Alps
