= Acherkogel =

Mountain in Austria

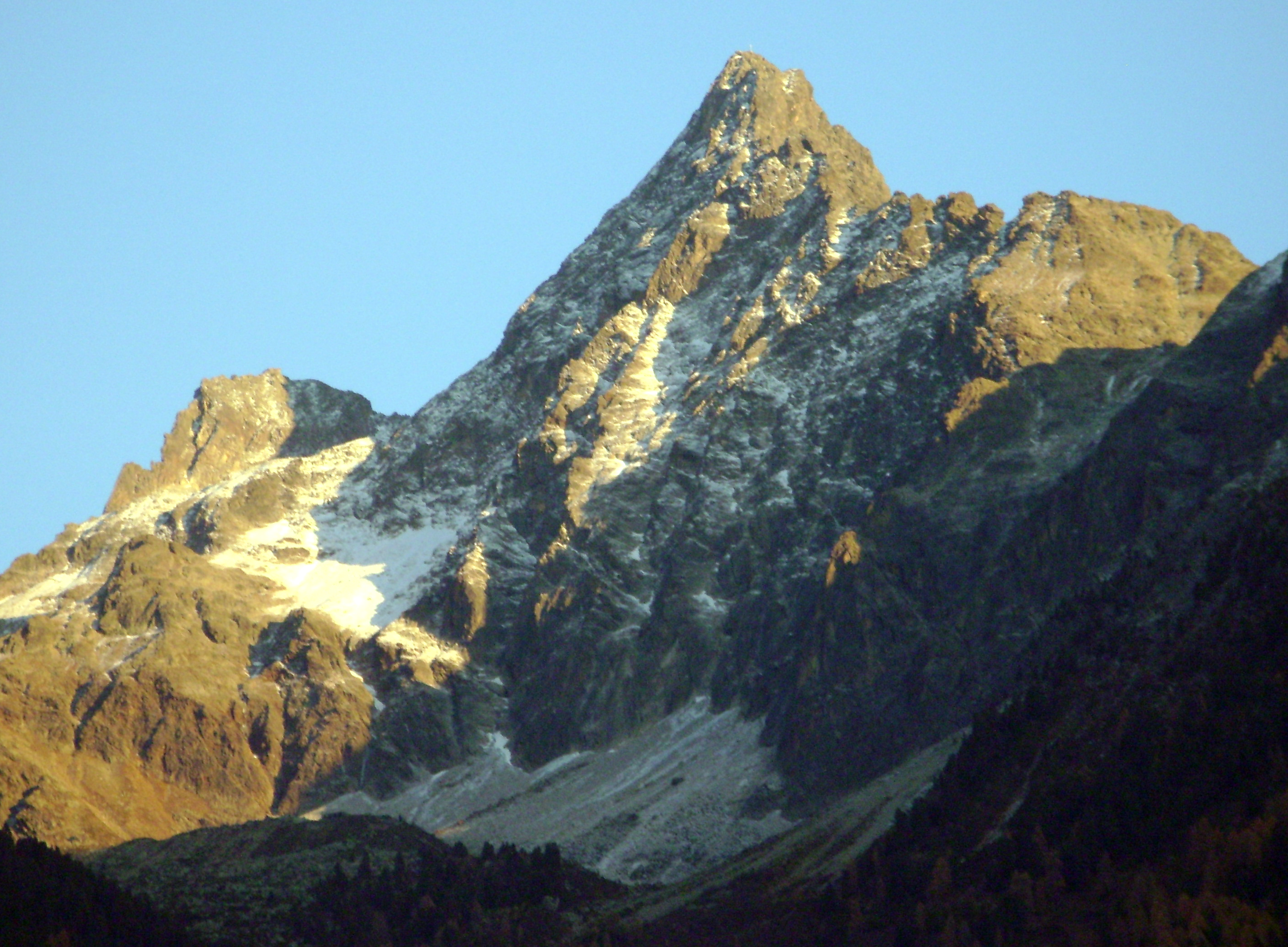
- The Acherkogel from the northwest

Highest point
- Elevation: 3,008 m (AA) (9,869 ft)
- Prominence: 278 m ↓ Niederreichscharte
- Isolation: 2.3 km → Hochreichkopf
- Listing: Alpine mountains above 3000 m (Northernmost three-thousander in the Tyrol)
- Coordinates: 47°11′23″N 10°57′25″E

Geography
- Location within Austria
- Country: Austria
- State: Tyrol
- Parent range: Stubai Alps

Geology
- Mountain type: Rock summit
- Rock type: Granitic gneiss

Climbing
- First ascent: 24 August 1881 Ludwig Purtscheller
- Easiest route: From Hochoetz via the Bielefelder Hut to the Mittertaler Scharte, continuing via the north face (UIAA Grade II, mostly I)

The Acherkogel is a mountain in the Austrian Alps with a 3,008 m (9,869 ft) high summit. It is the northernmost three-thousander in the state of Tyrol. It dominates the village of Oetz in the lower valley of the River Ötz, where high rock faces rise to the northwest and southwest. To the west, a sharp ridge leads down to the Achplatte (2,423 m) and Habicher Wand (2,176 m), another ridge strikes northeast to the 2,894 m high Maningkogel. Another sharp ridge heads southeast to the 2,954 m high Wechnerkogel. In the main, the Acherkogel has the character of a rocky peak, only to the north and east are there small snowfields.

It was first climbed on 24 August 1881 by Ludwig Purtscheller from the southeast and south ridge over a route that has not been used since. His climbing partner, the chamois hunter Franz Schnaiter from Kühtai, stayed behind on the south ridge when the climbing became very exposed.

== Routes to the summit ==
- The north face (UIAA II) was first traversed by Otto Melzer in 1893 and is considered the normal route today. The Bielefelder Hütte is the usual base camp.
- The northeast ridge (UIAA III, K. Holzhammer, 1924) leads from the ridge between the Acherkogel and Maningkogel to the summit and is the most attractive climb. This route is normally tackled by crossing the Maningkogel coming from the Mittertal. The start point for this route is usually the Kühtai or Mittergrathütte.
- The southern ridge (UIAA II, F. Hörtnagl/H. Schmotzer, 1899) is usually started at the Dortmunder Hütte. The route used by the first climbers to conquer the peak runs nearby, but is no longer passable.
- The southwest face (UIAA II, F. Gstrein/F. Lantschner/M. Pfaundler 1891) used to be the normal route, but is now rarely used.

Less frequented routes are:

- the southeast face (UIAA V-, P. Schillfahrt/N. Raich, 1975),
- the western ridge (UIAA III, F. Lantschner, 1893) und
- the northwest face to the western ridge (F. Lantschner, 1921)

== Sources ==
Klier, Heinrich; Walter Klier (1980). Alpenvereinsführer Stubaier Alpen (in German) (9th ed.). Munich: Bergverlag Rudolf Rother. ISBN 3-7633-1212-9.

== Gallery ==
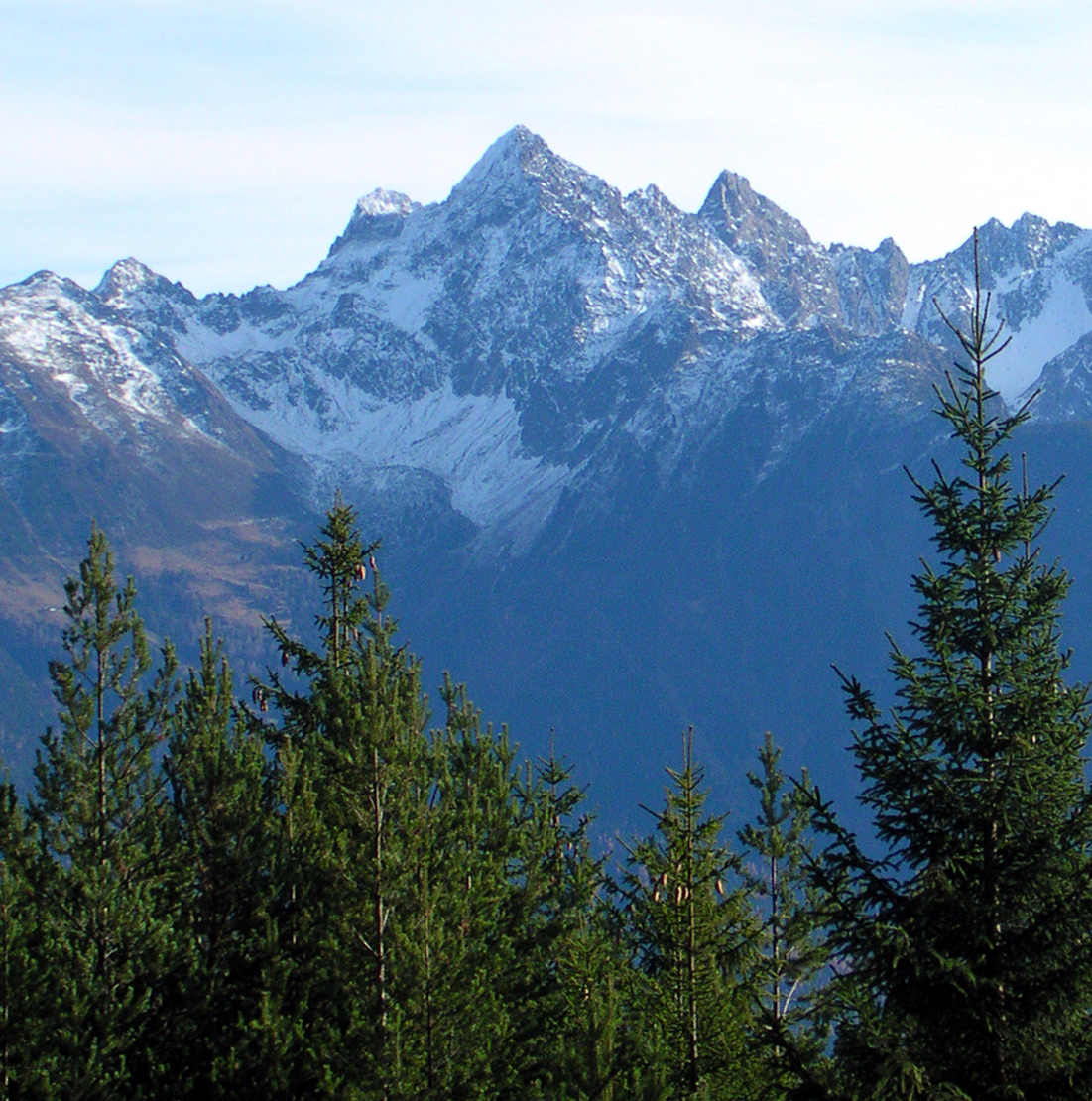
Left to right: Maningkogel, Acherkogel and Wechnerkogel (from the NW)

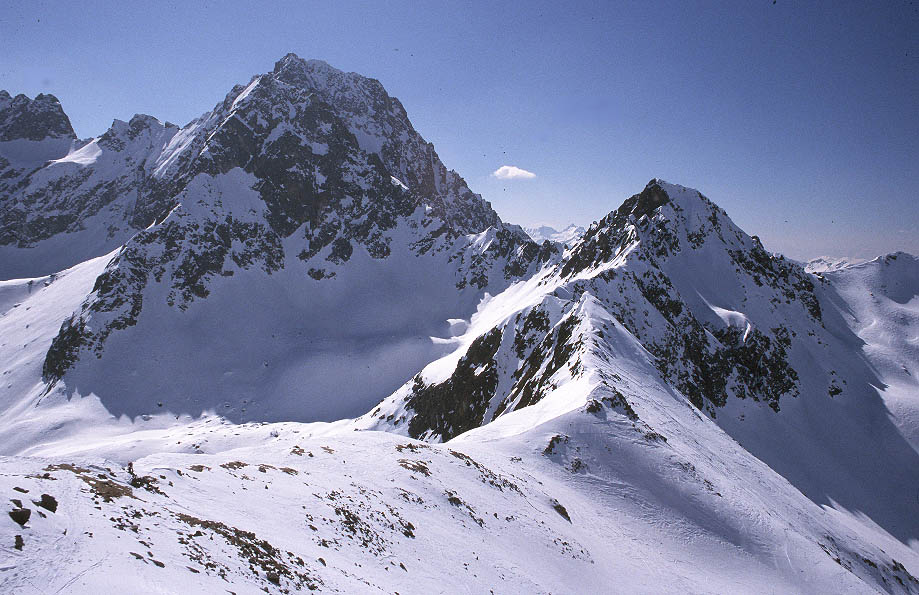
The Acherkogel from the Hintere Karlesspitze (from the NE)

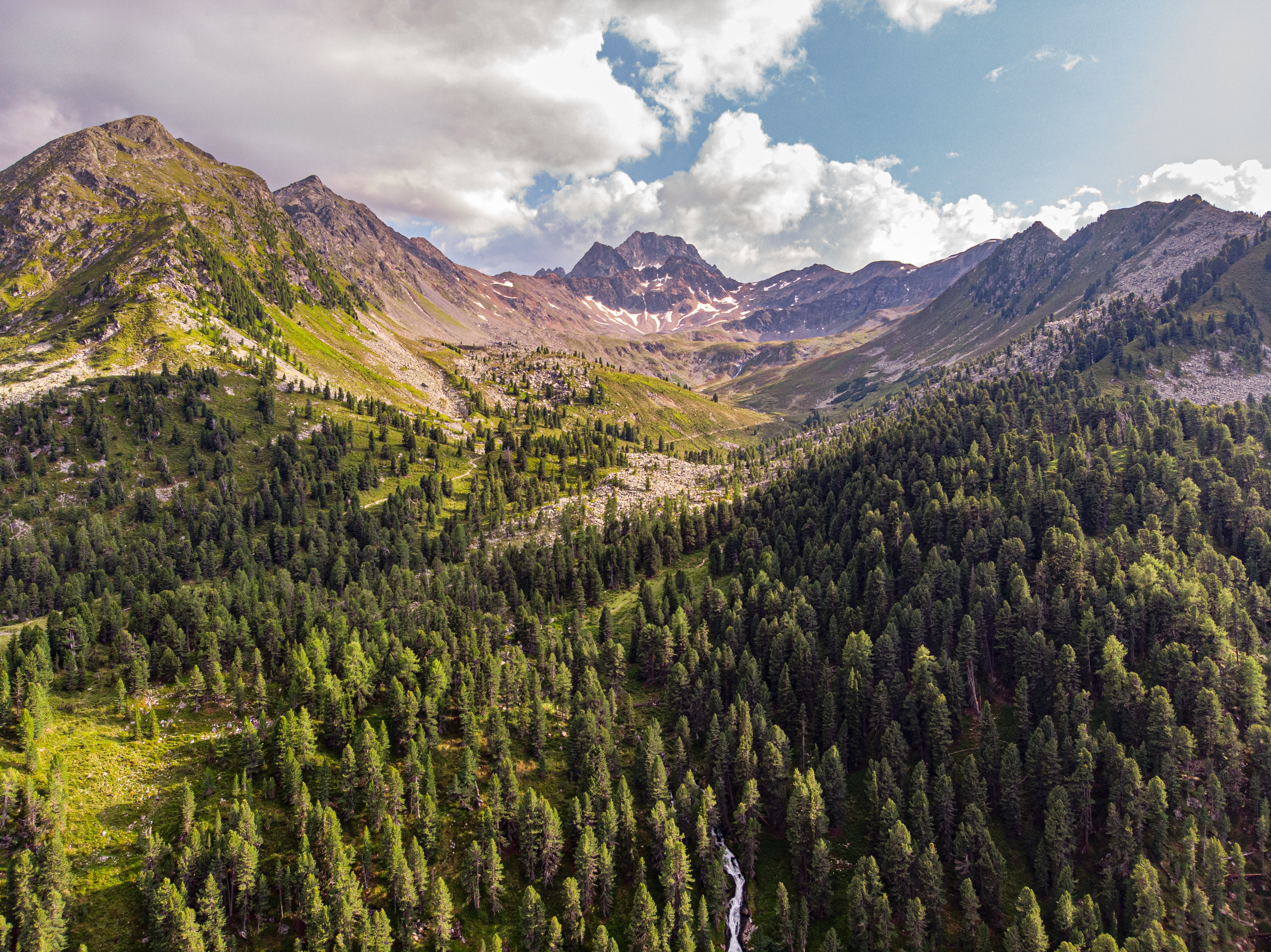
Acherkogel from near Ochsengarten in Kühtai
