= Sulzkogel =

Mountain in the Stubai Alps in Tyrol

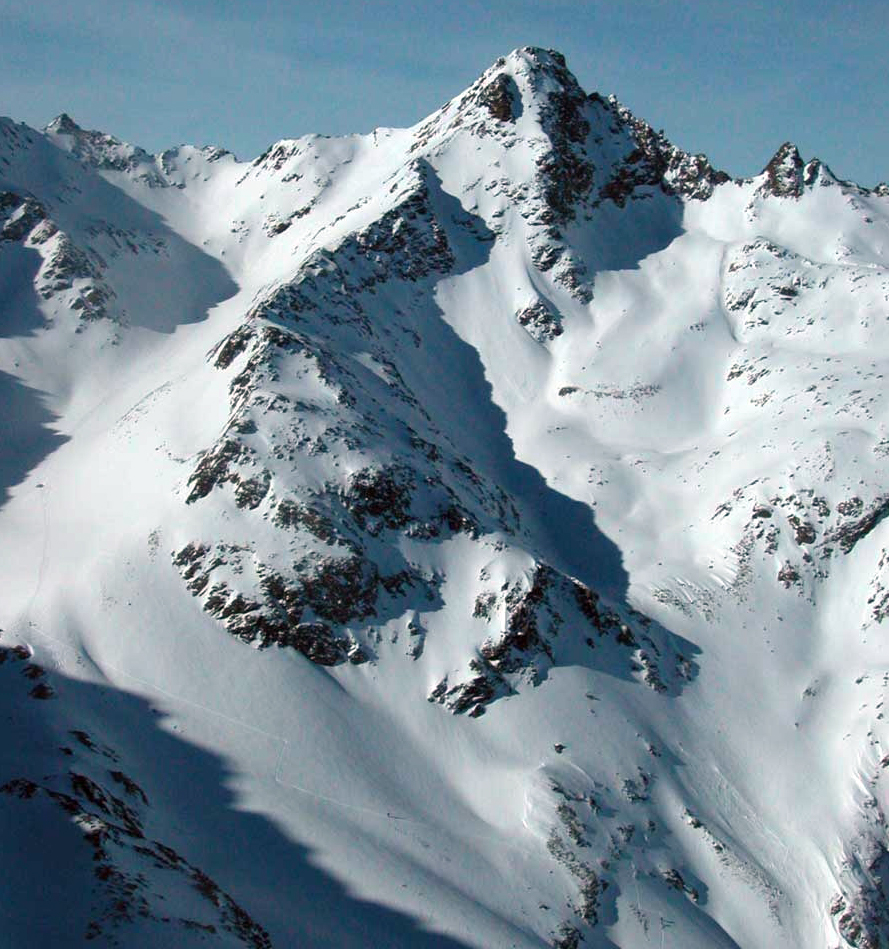
- The Sulzkogel from the east. Right, on the arête: the Mittagsturm pinnacle

Highest point
- Elevation: 3,016 m (AA) (9,895 ft)
- Prominence: 3,016-2,777 m ↓ Finstertaler Scharte
- Isolation: 2.8 km → Zwieselbacher Rosskogel
- Coordinates: 47°10′55″N 11°00′41″E

Geography
- Location within Austria
- Location: south of Kühtai/Tyrol
- Parent range: Stubaier Alpen

Geology
- Mountain type: Felsgipfel
- Rock type: Gneiss

Climbing
- First ascent: 1878 Pock/Tütscher
- Normal route: from Kühtai through the Finstertal valley

The Sulzkogel is a mountain, 3,016 m (AA), in the Stubai Alps in the Austrian state of Tyrol.

== Topography ==
The Sulzkogel lies about 3.5 kilometres south of the winter sports resort of Kühtai. To the west a sharp arête drops away from the summit of the Sulzkogel into the valley of Längental, separating the cirques of Mittagskar in the northwest and Stierkar in the south. To the northeast below the steep northeast face and east arête lies the Finstertal valley and the Finstertalspeicher, a reservoir belonging to the Sellrain-Silz Power Station. To the north along a sharp arête are the Mittagsturm pinnacle (2,929 m (AA)), the twin peaks of the Mittagsköpfe (2,895 m (AA) and 2,934 m (AA)) and the Zwölferkogel (2,988 m (AA)). To the south is the Gamskogel (2,965 m (AA)). Between the Sulzkogel and the Gamskogel below a wide rocky ridge lies the Gamskogelferner, a glacier that descends to an elevation of 2,700 m (AA).

== Paths ==
The normal route, in winter a popular ski tour, runs up the northern edge of the Gamskogelferner glacier and up the south ridge to the summit. The first ascent was made by Julius Pock and Bernhard Tütscher who, in 1878, selected the route up the southwest flank from the Stierkar cirque. The north arête of the col south of the Mittagsturm is significantly more difficult (climbing grade III+). Ascents are also possible along the east arête and along the ridge between the Sulzkogel and Gamskogel.

== Literature ==
- Heinrich; Walter Klier (1980), Alpine Club guide Stubaier Alpen (in German), Munich: Rother Bergverlag, pp. 354–356, ISBN 3-7633-1212-9

== Gallery ==
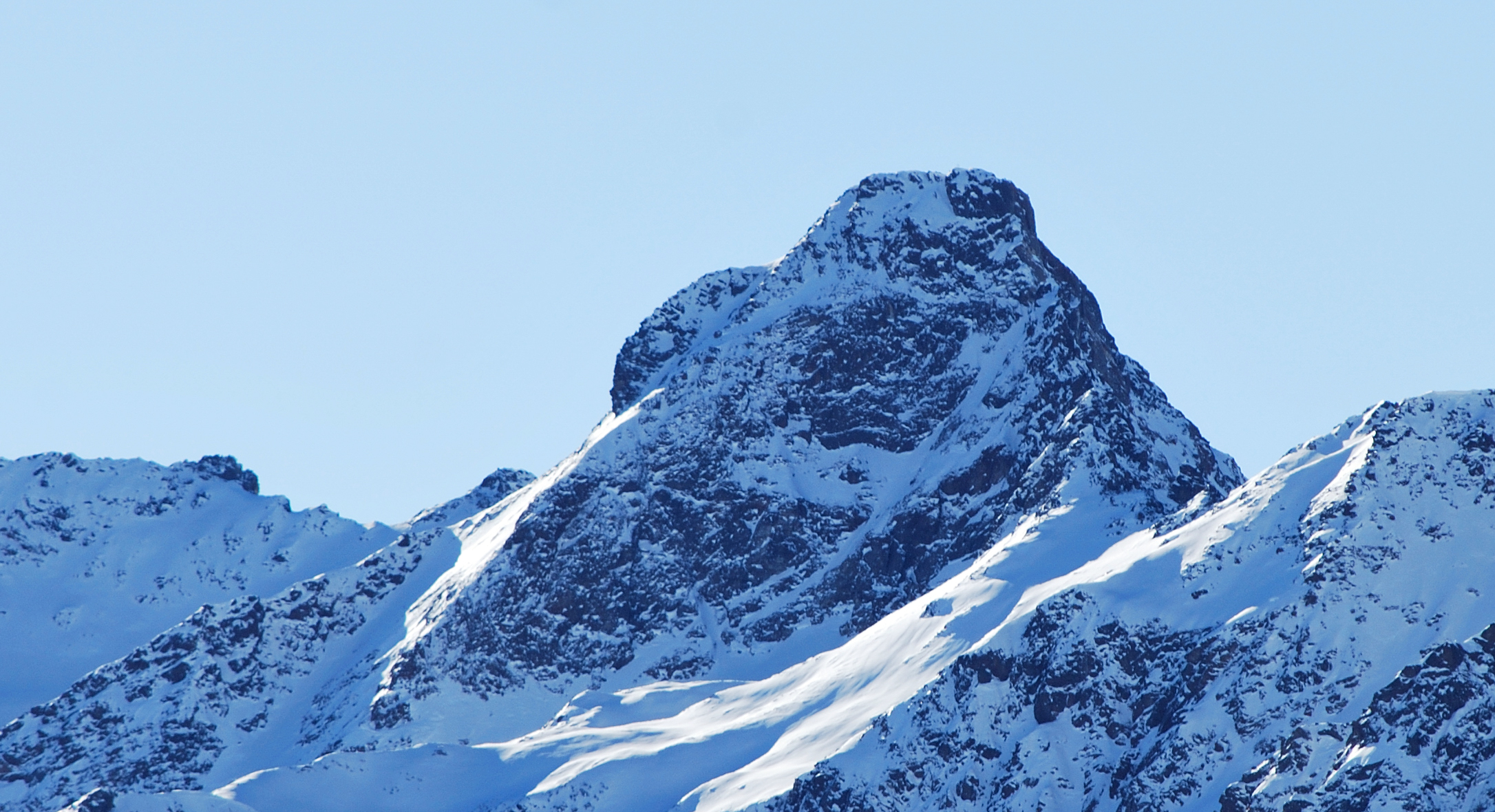
The Sulzkogel from the northeast

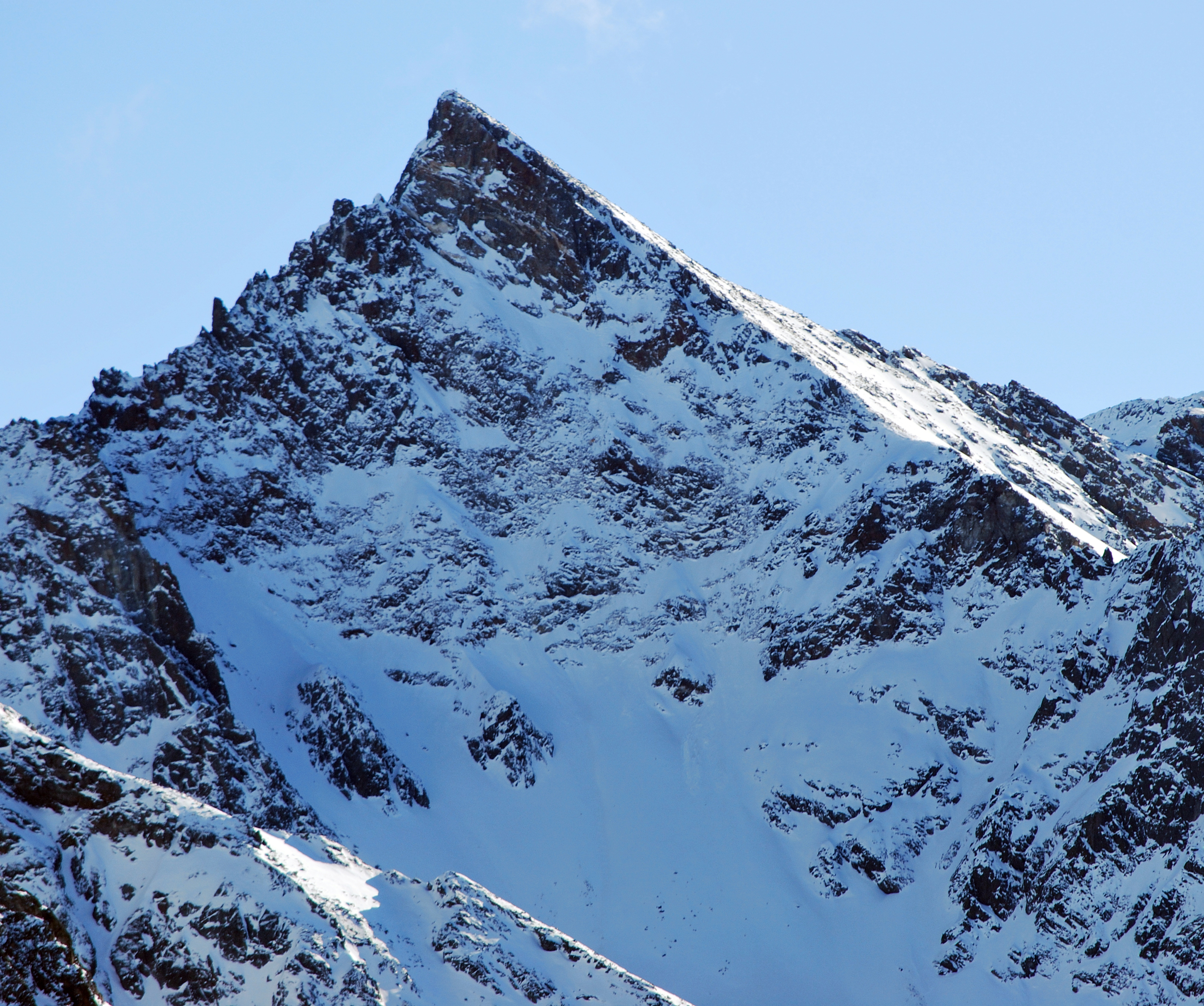
From the northwest

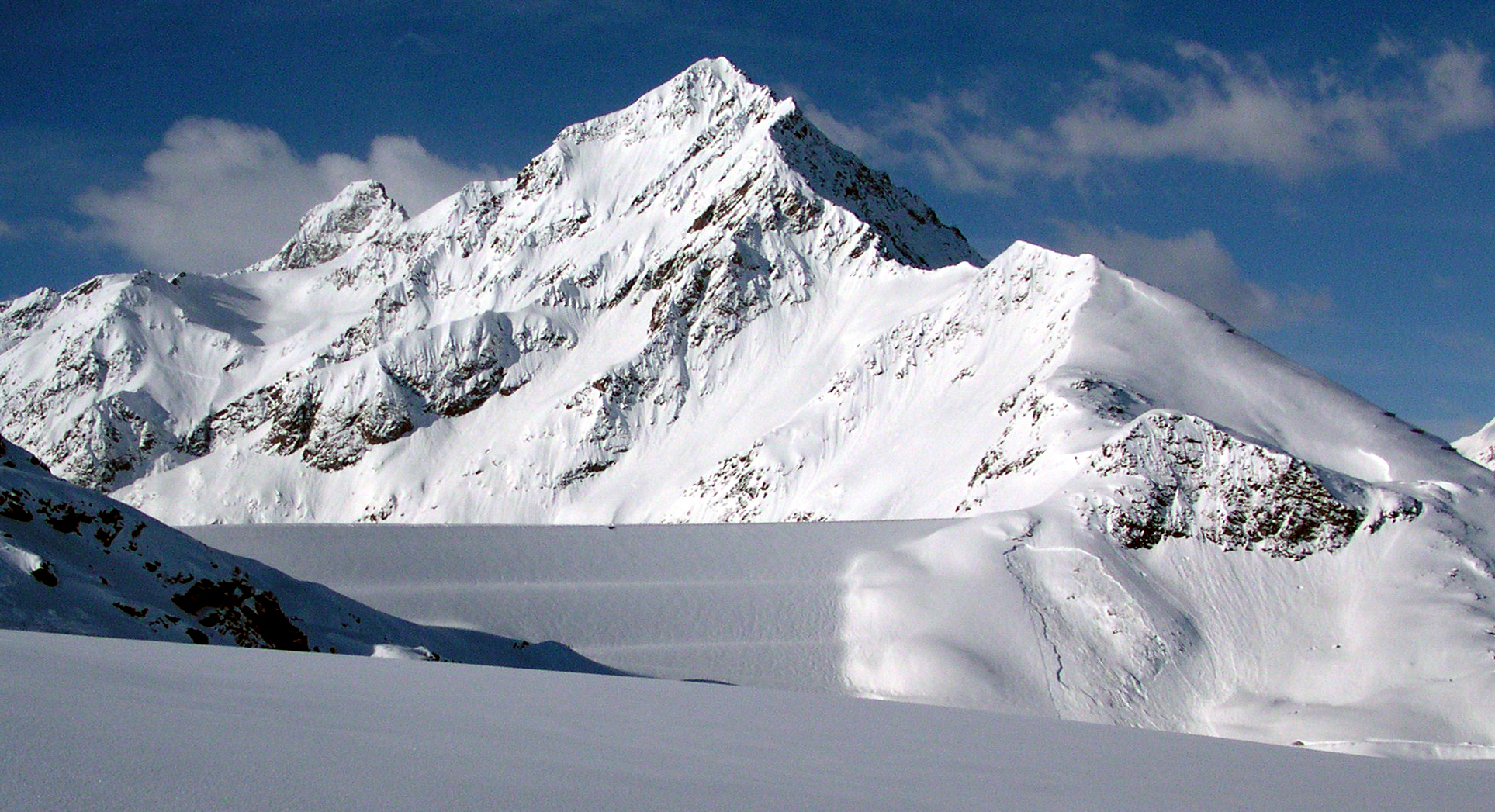
Sulzkogel (left) and Zwölferkogel behind the dam of the Finstertalspeicher

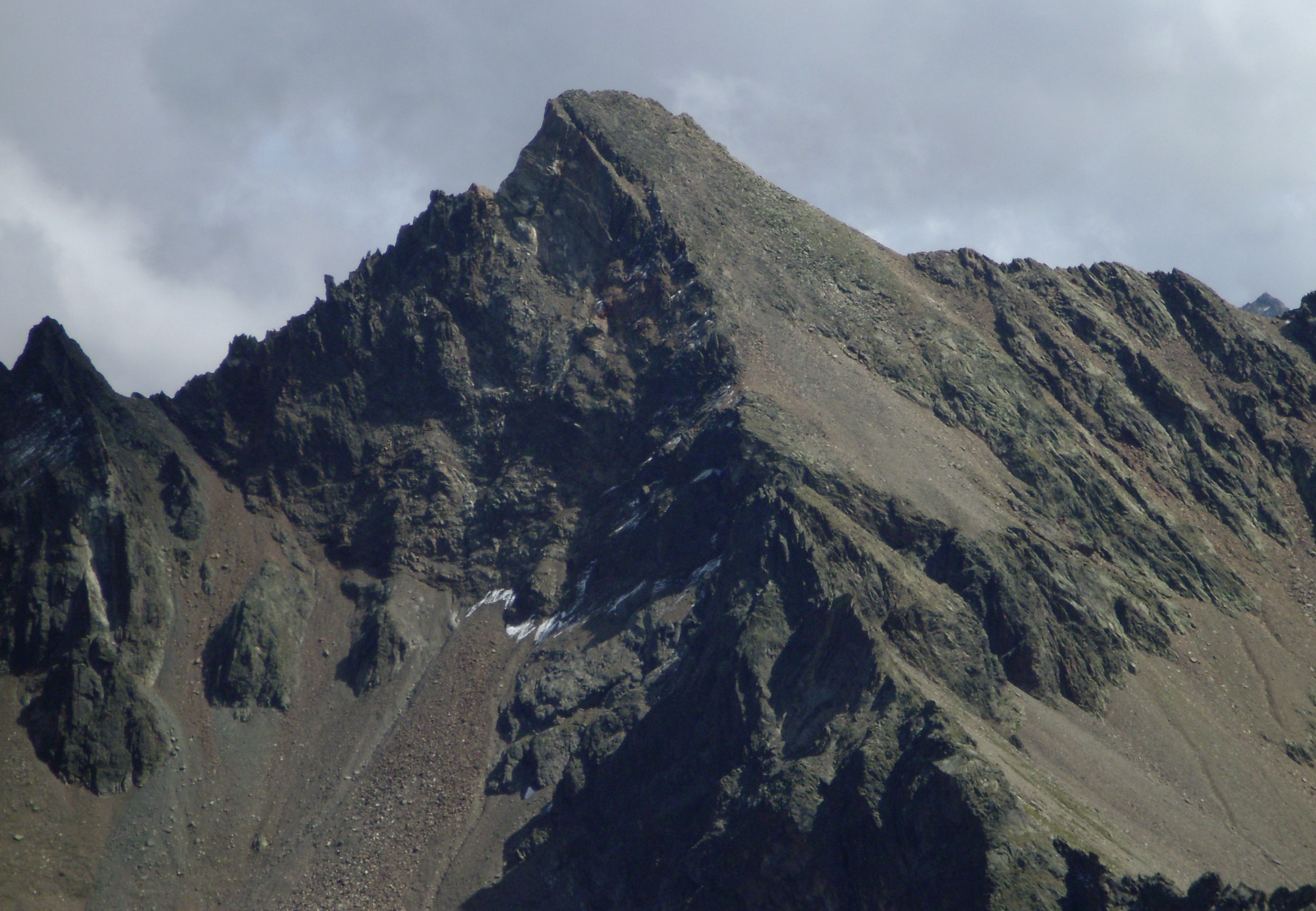
From the west
