= Zwölferkogel =

Zwölferkogel is the name of various mountains, all in Austria:

- Zwölferkogel (Stubai Alps) (2,988 m), Tyrol
- Zwölferkogel (Totes Gebirge) (2,099 m), a prominent mountain of the Alps, in Styria/Upper Austria

== See also ==
- Zwölferkofel, a peak of the Sexten Dolomites
