= Hochreichkopf =

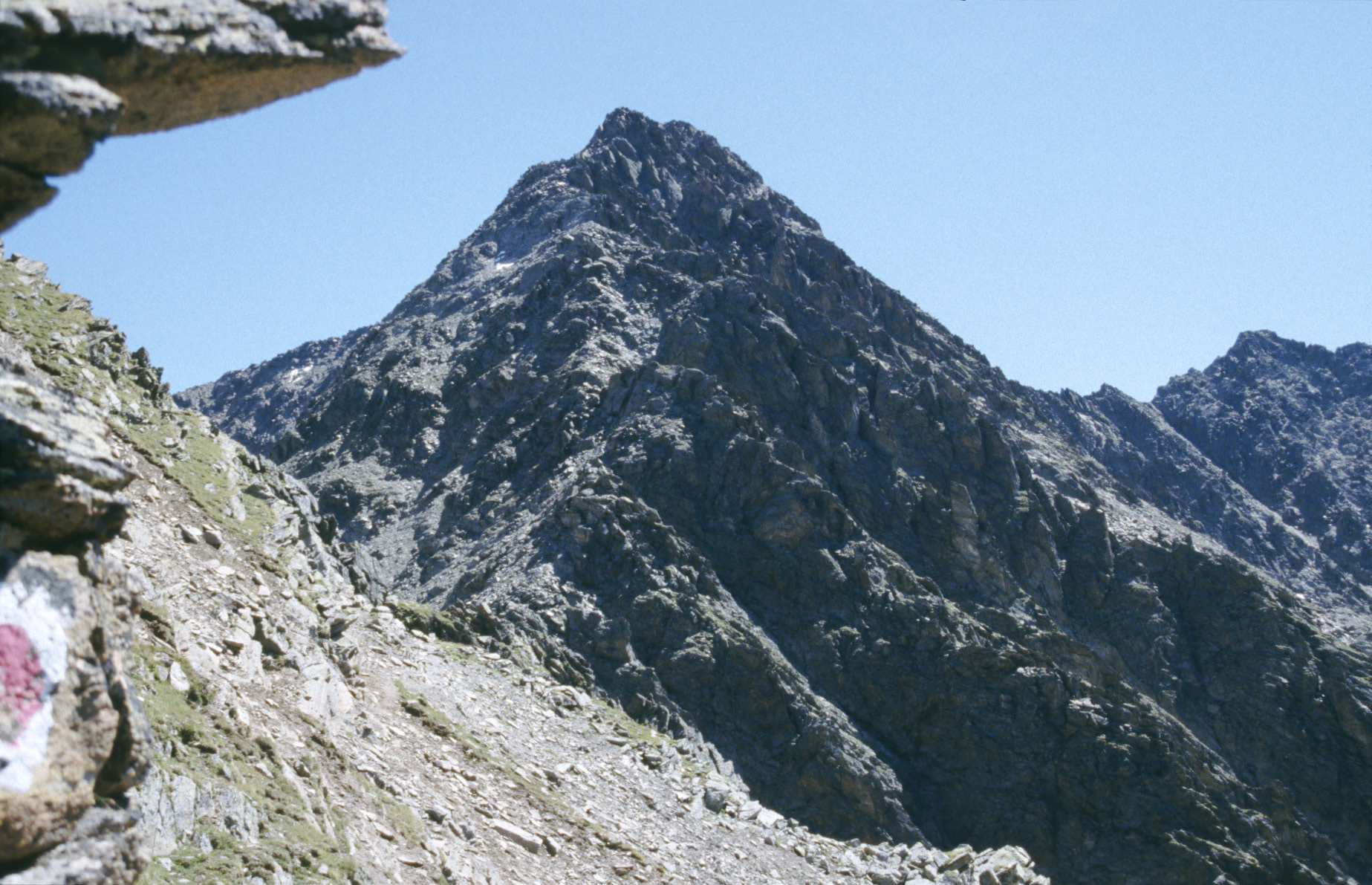
- The Hochreichkopf from the northwest

Highest point
- Elevation: 3,010 m (AA) (9,880 ft)
- Prominence: 367 m ↓ Plattkogelscharte
- Isolation: 3.4 km → Sulzkogel
- Listing: Alpine mountains above 3000 m
- Coordinates: 47°10′13″N 10°58′11″E

Geography
- Location within Austria
- Location: Tyrol, Austria
- Parent range: Stubai Alps

Climbing
- First ascent: 28 August 1890 by Ludwig Purtscheller (touristic)
- Normal route: From the Schweinfurter Hut via the Hochreichjoch col

The Hochreichkopf (3,010 m (AA)) is a mountain in the northwestern part of the Stubai Alps in the Austrian state of Tyrol. Its broad summit lies between the Niederreichjoch and Hochreichjoch cols east of and above the Ötztal valley.

The easiest waymarked route runs from the Schweinfurter Hut to the east taking 3½ hours to get to the top via the Hochreichjoch col (2,912 m). Alternatively the peak may also be ascended from the south. This route was the one taken by the first climbers and runs from Kühtai over the Niederreichscharte to the Hochreichscharte col, where it meets the route coming from the east. For this variation about 4½ hours should be allowed. The crossing of the west flank of the summit between the Niederreichjoch and Hochreichjoch requires sure-footedness.

== Literature and maps ==
- Walter Klier: Stubaier Alpen, Alpine Club Guide, Bergverlag Rudolf Rother, Munich, 2006, ISBN 3-7633-1271-4
- Dieter Seibert: Leichte 3000er, Bruckmann Verlag, Munich, 2001, ISBN 3-7654-3677-1
- Alpine Club map, Sheet 31/2, 1:25,000, Stubaier Alpen; Sellrain, ISBN 3-928777-73-4
