= Oetz =

- Municipality
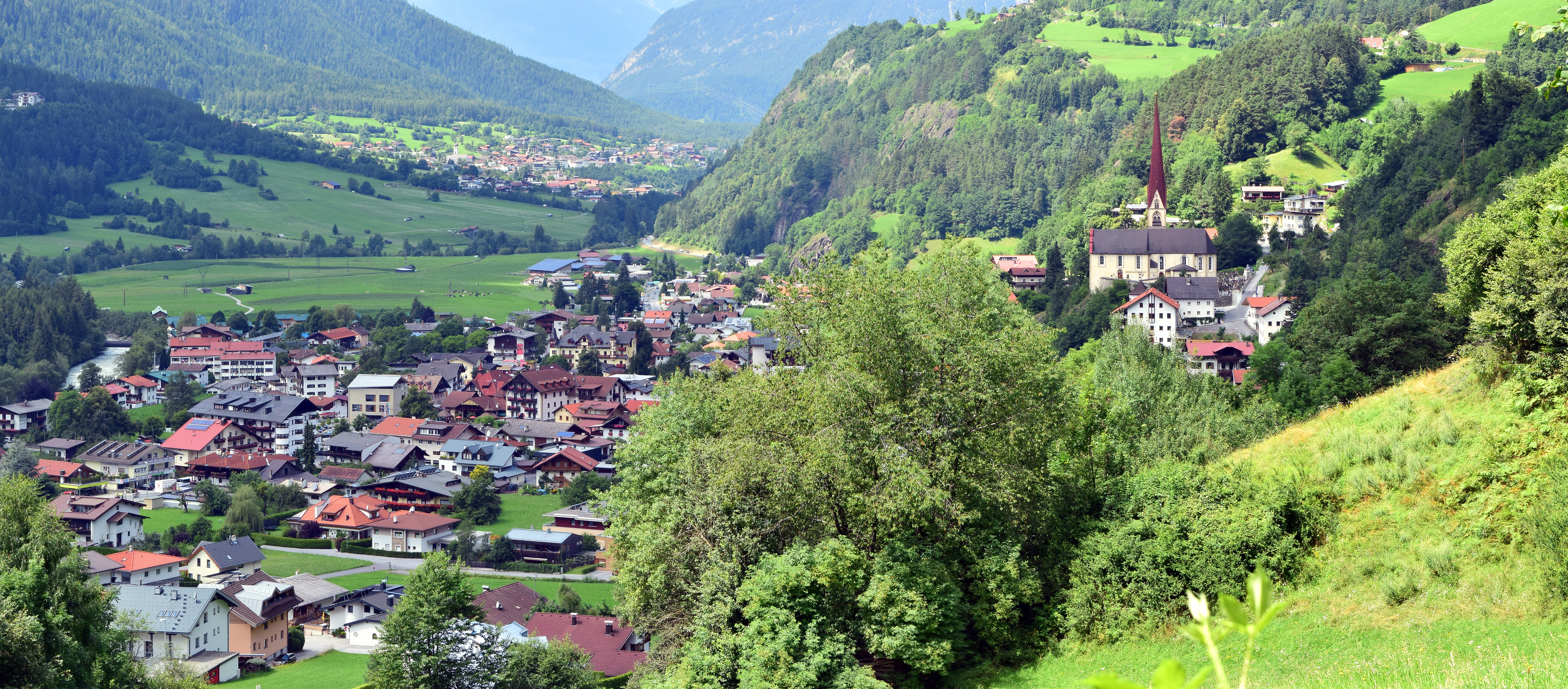

- Coat of arms

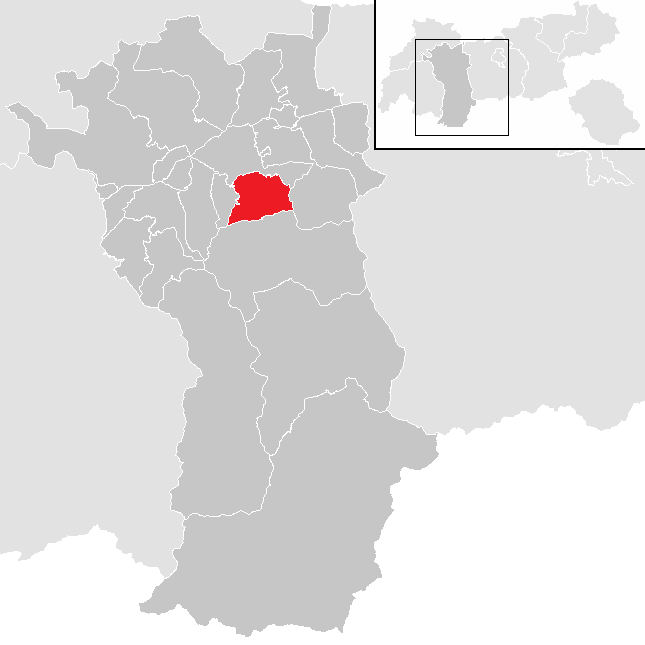
- Location in the district

- Location within Tyrol, Austria Location within Austria
- Coordinates: 47°12′00″N 10°54′00″E
- Country: Austria
- State: Tyrol
- District: Imst

Government
  - Mayor: Hansjörg Falkner (ÖVP)

Area
  - Total: 29.19 km^{2} (11.27 sq mi)
- Elevation: 812 m (2,664 ft)

Population (2021-01-01)
  - Total: 2,335
  - Density: 79.99/km^{2} (207.2/sq mi)
- Time zone: UTC+1 (CET)
  - Summer (DST): UTC+2 (CEST)
- Postal code: 6433
- Area code: 05252
- Vehicle registration: IM
- Website: www.oetz.tirol.gv.at

Oetz is a municipality in the Imst district of Tyrol, Austria, located 11.7 km (7.3 mi) southeast of the town of Imst at the lower course of the Ötztaler Ache in the outer Ötztal valley at the foot of Acherkogel mountain (3 008 m, 9,869 ft).

== History ==
Settlement of the area around Oetz began around two thousand years ago. The village was mentioned for the first time as Ez in 1266. The parish church was constructed in the Late Gothic style, with extensions in 1667. Baroque interior alterations were completed in 1744. The church contains a crypt, an altar with a painting of St. Michael (1683), carvings and statues.

== Population ==
Historical population
| Year | Pop. | ±% |
|---|---|---|
| 1869 | 1,195 | — |
| 1880 | 1,140 | −4.6% |
| 1890 | 1,011 | −11.3% |
| 1900 | 989 | −2.2% |
| 1910 | 997 | +0.8% |
| 1923 | 1,116 | +11.9% |
| 1934 | 1,237 | +10.8% |
| 1939 | 1,206 | −2.5% |
| 1951 | 1,478 | +22.6% |
| 1961 | 1,549 | +4.8% |
| 1971 | 1,805 | +16.5% |
| 1981 | 1,999 | +10.7% |
| 1991 | 2,060 | +3.1% |
| 2001 | 2,203 | +6.9% |
| 2011 | 2,265 | +2.8% |

== Tourism ==
Ötz is a bi-seasonal tourist resort with approximately 350,000 overnight stays, and is a popular location for rafting and tourism. The town has a local heritage museum and art gallery called the Turmmuseum Ötz (formerly the Galerie zum alten Ötztal). Nearby attractions include Lake Piburg, the Auer Klamm (gorge), the Stuibenfall (waterfall), and the waterfall on the Tumpenbach (stream). The municipality has 2,265 inhabitants.

== Town partnerships ==
Ötz fosters partnerships with the following places:

- Hargesheim, Rhineland-Palatinate, Germany
