= Ötztaler Ache =

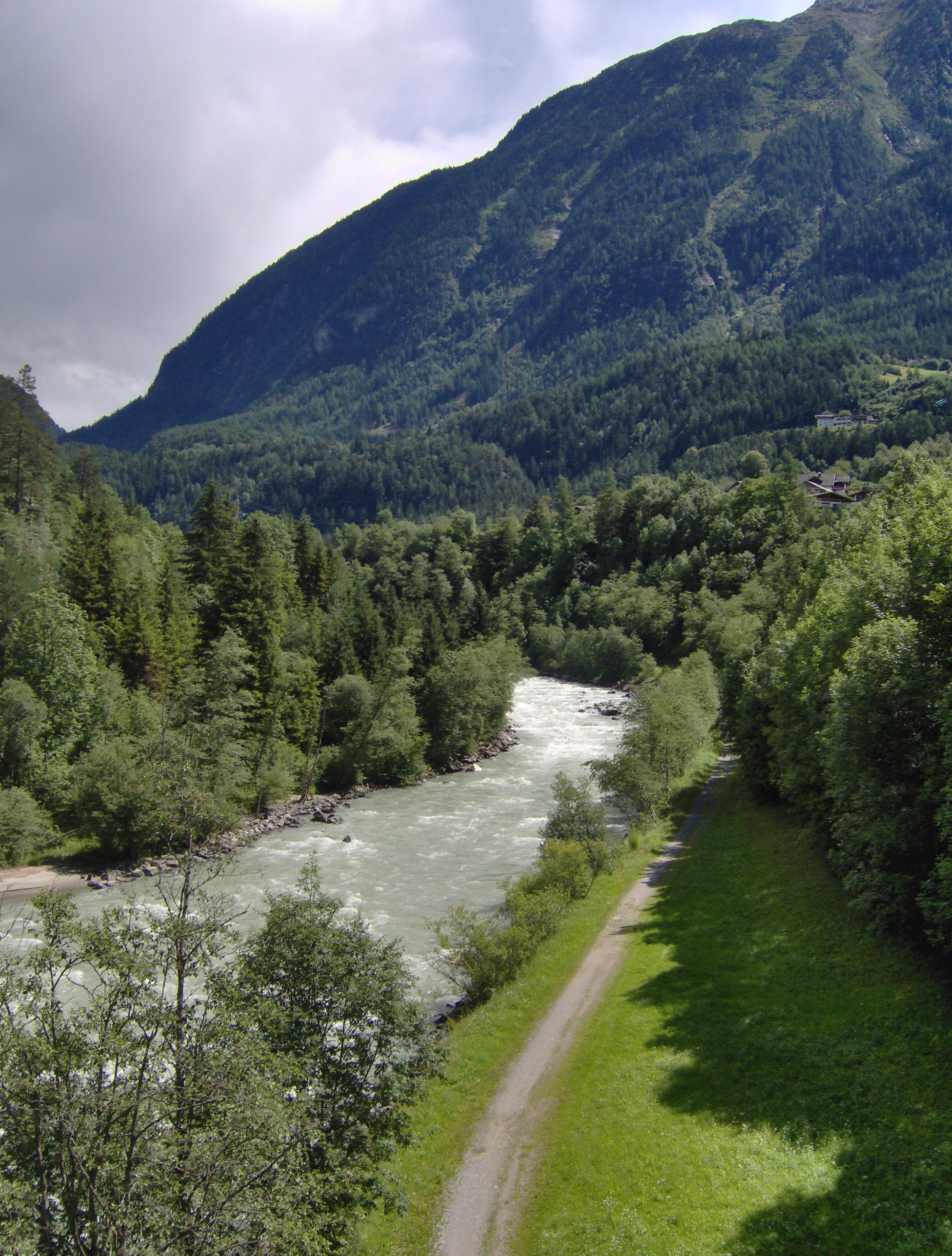
- The Ötztaler Ache near Sautens

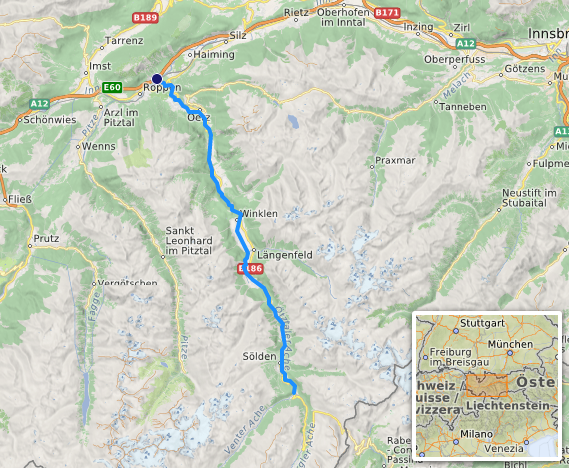

Location
- Country: Austria
- State: Tyrol

Physical characteristics
- Source
  - location: Ötztal Alps
- Mouth
  - location: Inn
  - coordinates: 47.2322°N 10.8383°E
- Length: 66.5 km (41.3 mi)
- Basin size: 893 km^{2} (345 sq mi)

Basin features
- Progression: Inn→ Danube→ Black Sea

The Ötztaler Ache is a river in the district of Imst, Tyrol state of Austria. It is a right tributary of the Inn. It flows through the Ötztal valley, a southern branch the Inntal. Including its source rivers Venter Ache and Rofenache, it is 66.5 kilometres (41.3 mi) long. The Rofenache is the runoff of the Hintereisferner, a glacier at the foot of the Weißkugel, Ötztal Alps. At Vent, near Sölden, it takes up the Niedertalbach and its name changes to Venter Ache. At the confluence with the Gurgler Ache in Zwieselstein, Sölden, the Ötztaler Ache proper is formed. It flows through Sölden, Längenfeld, Umhausen and Oetz before joining the Inn 8 kilometres (5.0 mi) east of Imst. The river is one of its bigger tributaries.

== Gallery ==
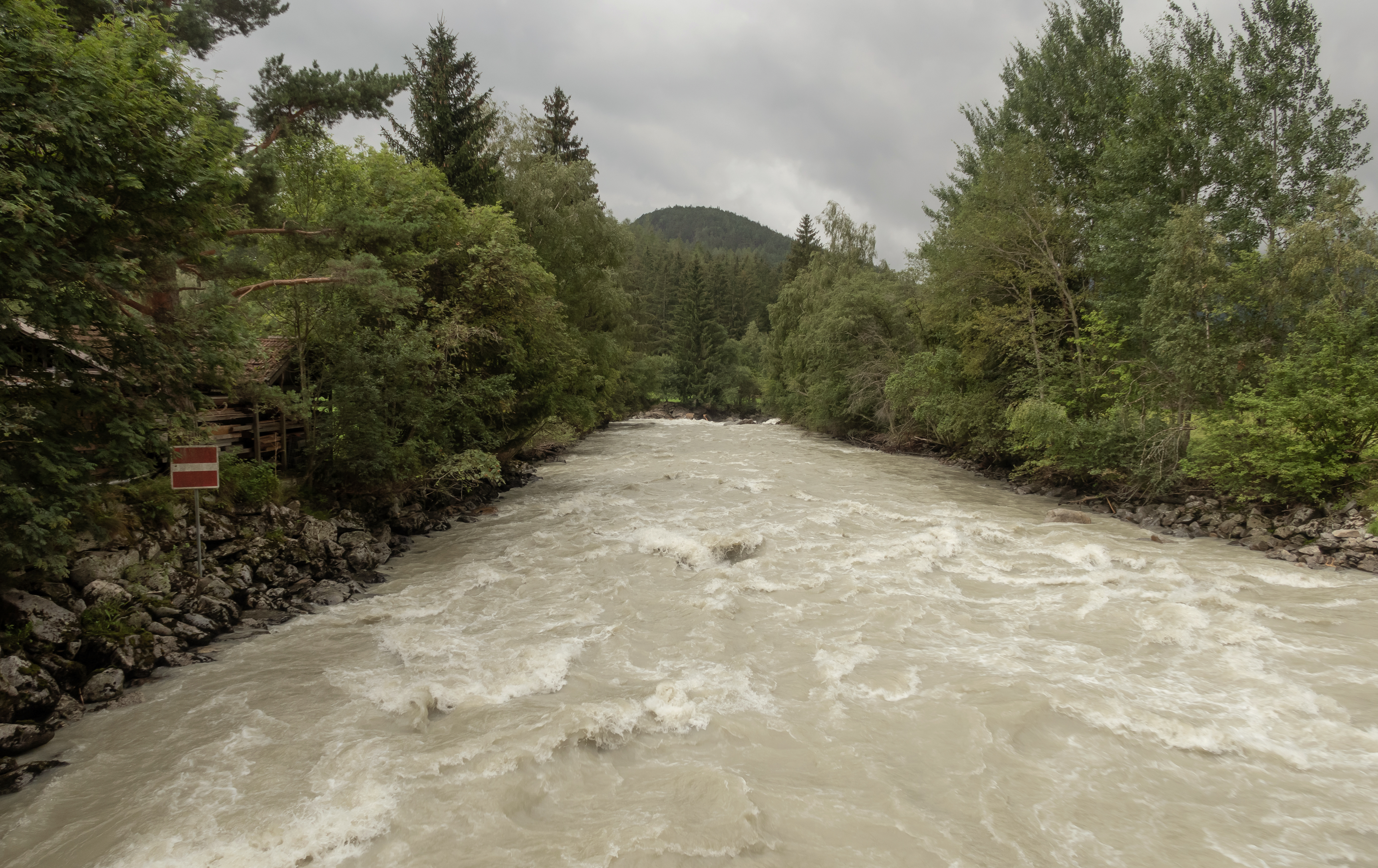
Ötztaler Ache in Habichen

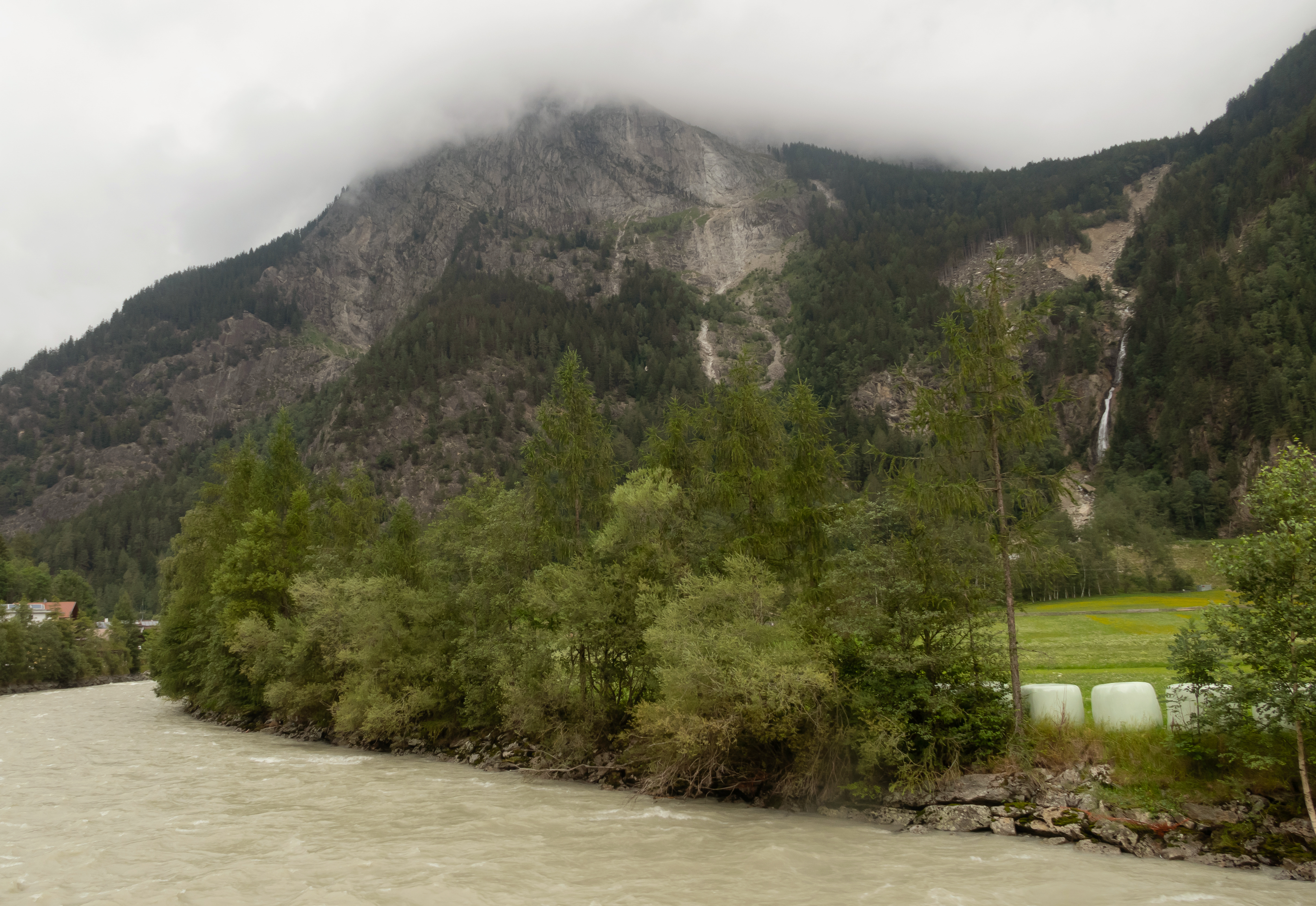
Bodele, Ötztaler Ache from the Riederbrücke

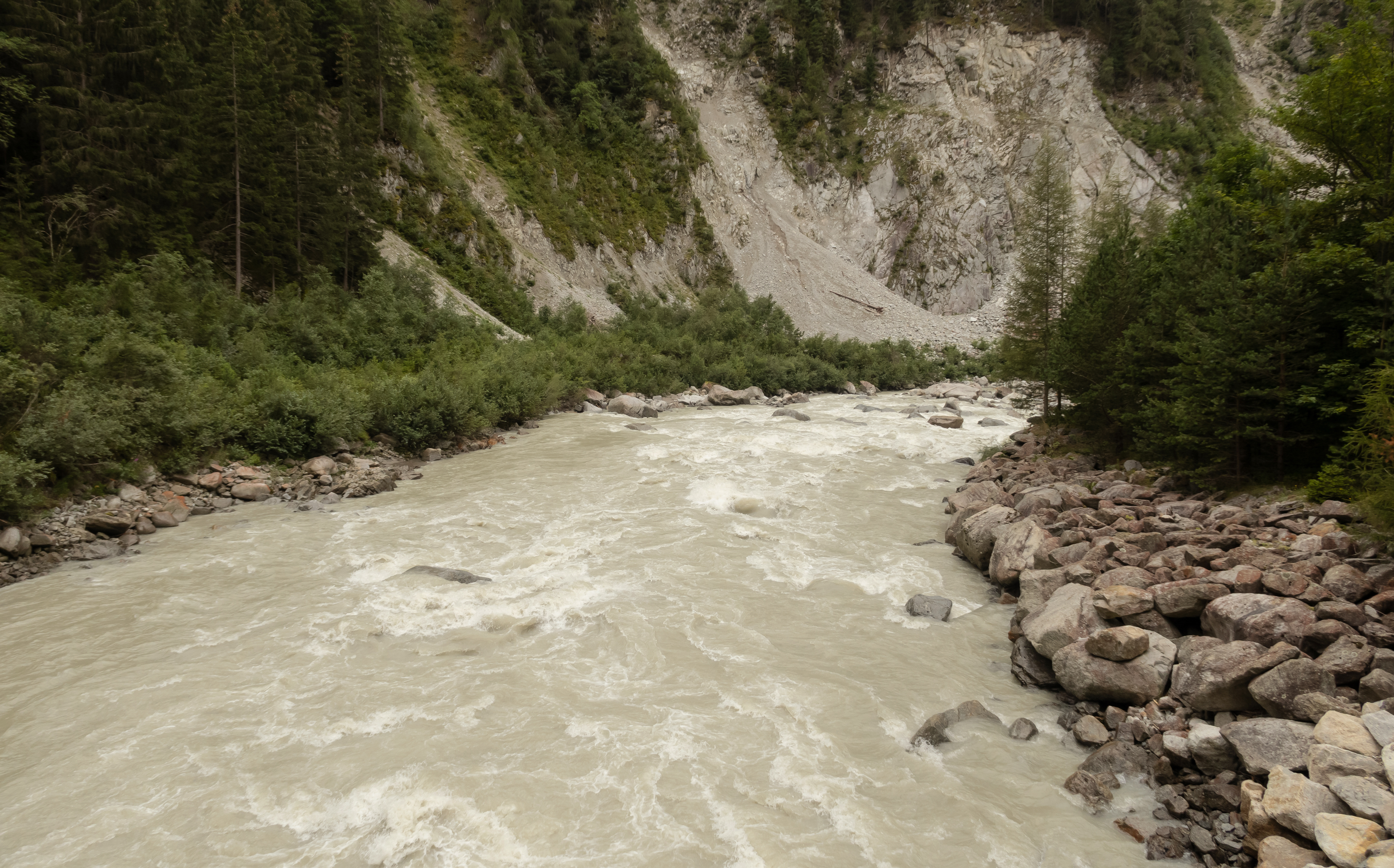
between Umhausen and Längenfeld, the Ötztaler Ache

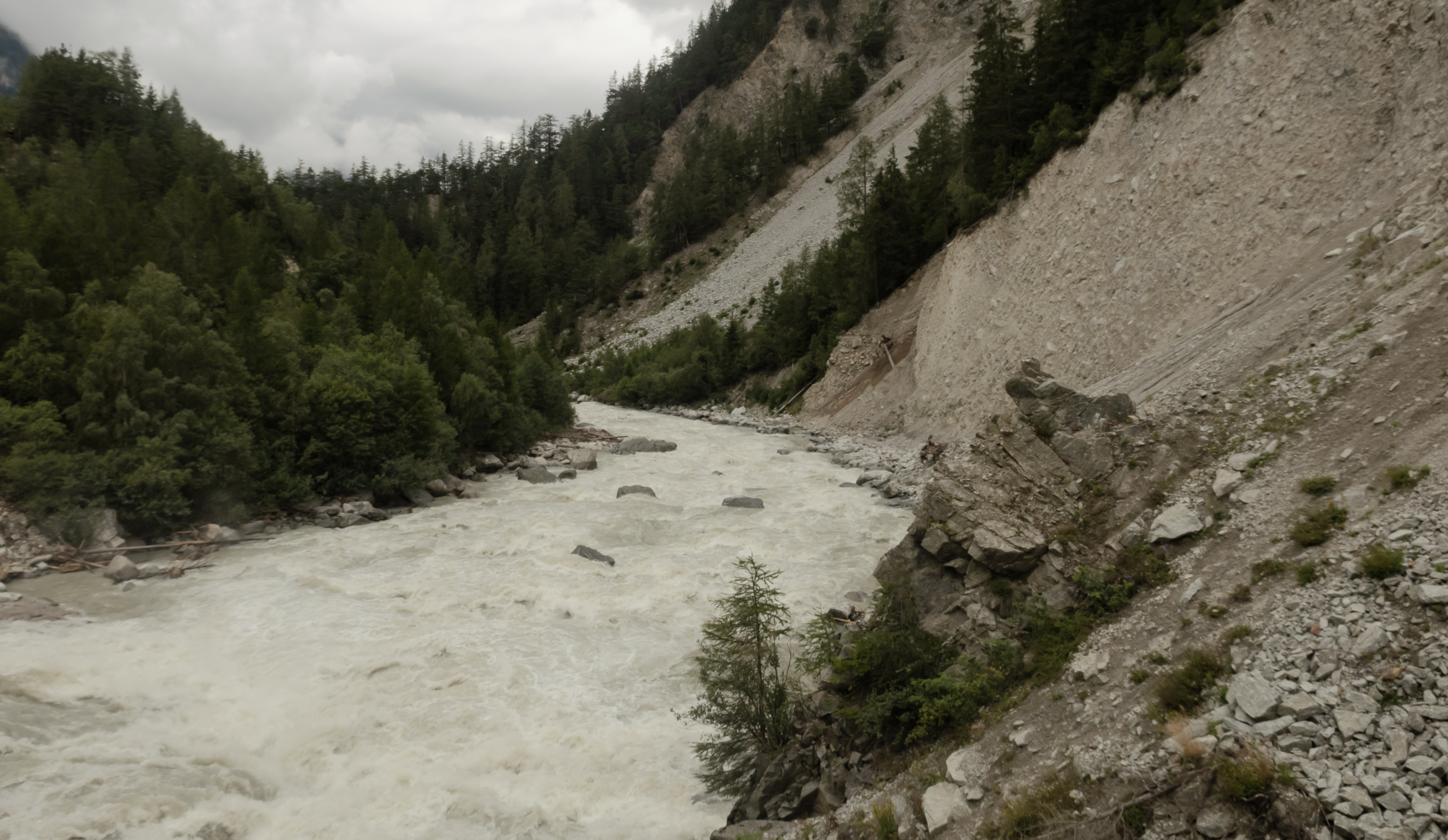
between Längenfeld and Umhausen, the Ötztaler Ache from the Ferdinands Radbrücke

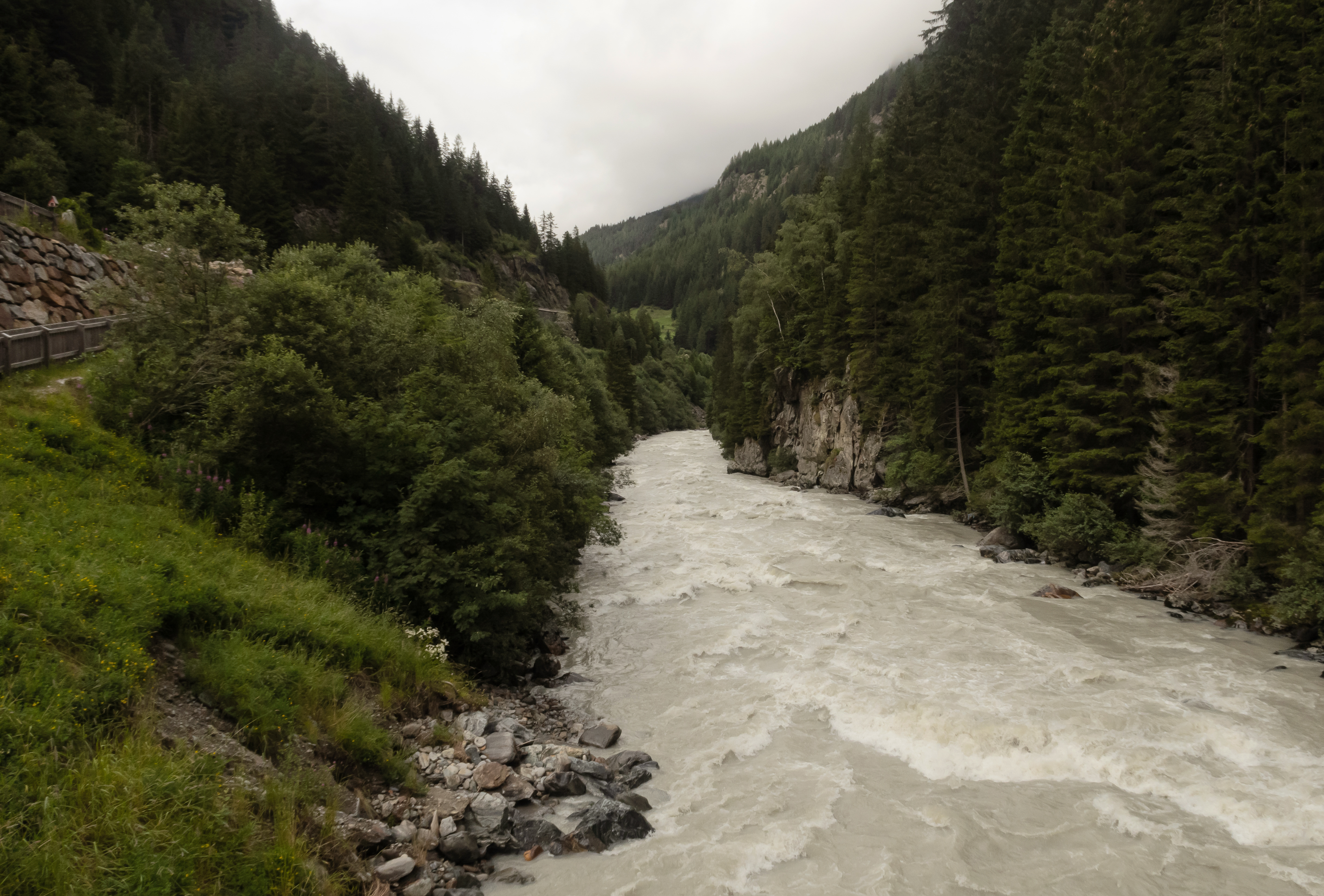
Aschbach, the Ötztaler Ache near the Waldwegbrücke
