= Hargesheim =

- Municipality
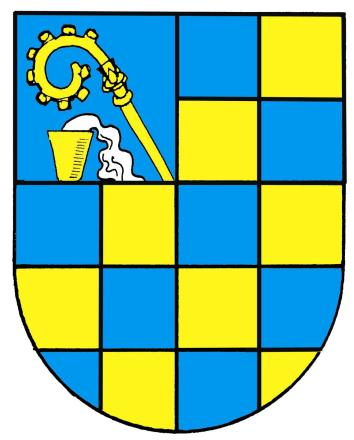
- Coat of arms

- Location of Hargesheim within Bad Kreuznach district
- Interactive map of Hargesheim
- Location within Germany Location within Rhineland-Palatinate
- Coordinates: 49°51′50″N 7°47′15″E
- Country: Germany
- State: Rhineland-Palatinate
- District: Bad Kreuznach
- Municipal assoc.: Rüdesheim

Government
  - Mayor (2019–24): Haiko Grün

Area
  - Total: 2.58 km^{2} (1.00 sq mi)
- Elevation: 115 m (377 ft)

Population (2025-12-31)
  - Total: 2,944
  - Density: 1,140/km^{2} (2,960/sq mi)
- Time zone: UTC+01:00 (CET)
  - Summer (DST): UTC+02:00 (CEST)
- Postal codes: 55595
- Dialling codes: 0671
- Vehicle registration: KH
- Website: www.hargesheim.de

Hargesheim is an Ortsgemeinde – a municipality belonging to a Verbandsgemeinde, a kind of collective municipality – in the Bad Kreuznach district in Rhineland-Palatinate, Germany. It belongs to the Verbandsgemeinde of Rüdesheim, whose seat is in the municipality of Rüdesheim an der Nahe. Hargesheim is a state-recognized tourism community.

== Geography ==
=== Location ===
Hargesheim lies on the Gräfenbach in a side valley of the Nahe. Lying 5 km away is the district seat of Bad Kreuznach. Hargesheim thus lies on the boundary between Rhenish Hesse and the Hunsrück. A great part of the municipality's area is built up (48 ha), whereas only a small part is used for forestry. The rest is used for either agriculture or winegrowing.

=== Neighbouring municipalities ===
Clockwise from the north, Hargesheim's neighbours are Guldental, Bad Kreuznach, Roxheim and Gutenberg, all of which likewise lie within the Bad Kreuznach district.

=== Constituent communities ===
Also belonging to Hargesheim is the outlying homestead of Baumdicker Mühle.

== History ==
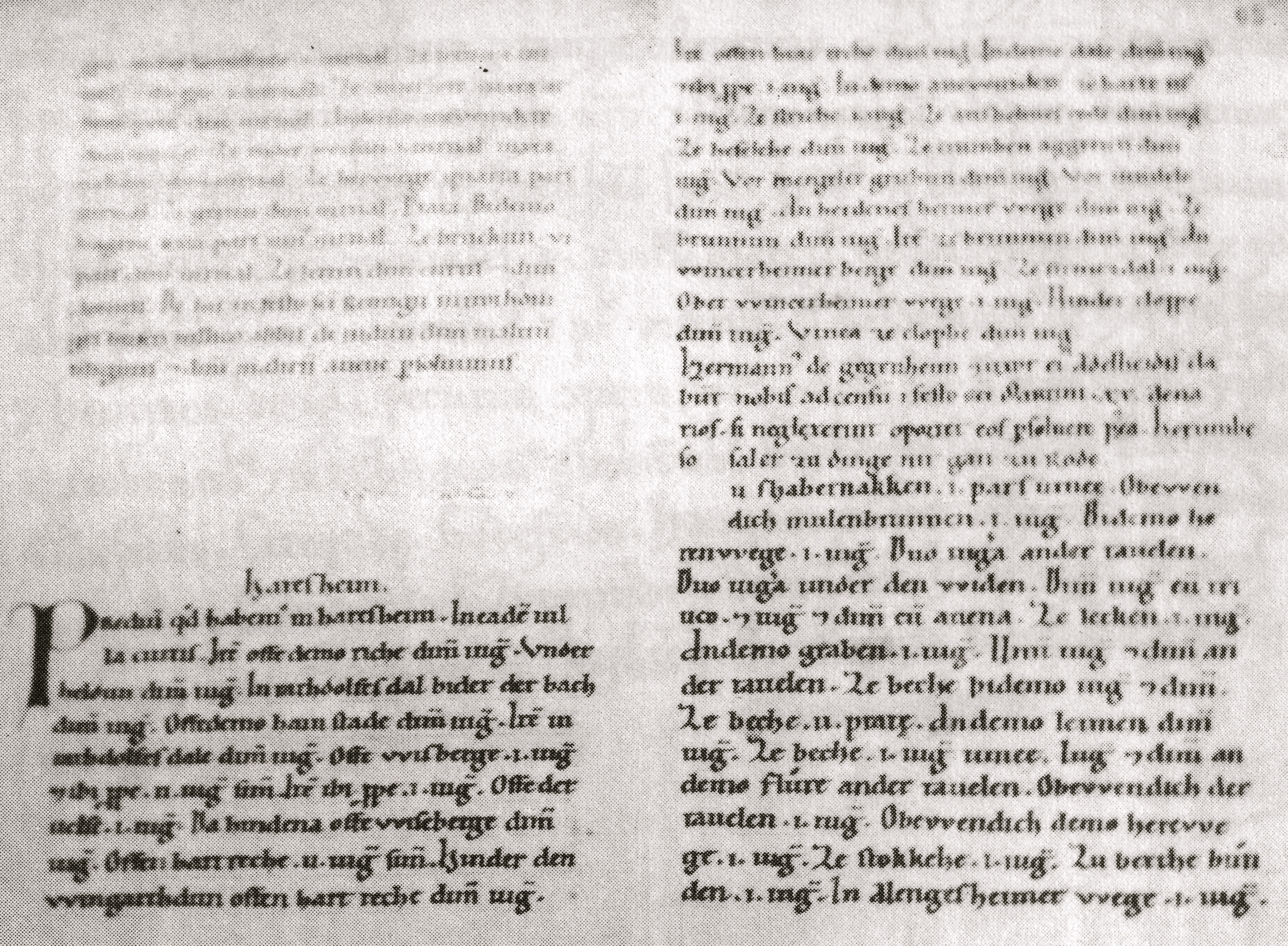
Hargesheim's first documentary mention from 1158

It is clear from archaeological finds that the Hargesheim area was one of those in the Nahe river area that were already settled as far back as the New Stone Age about 5000 BC. Sometime about AD 600, Hargesheim arose as an outlying centre of the ancient settlement of Roxheim. Centuries later, about 1100, Hargesheim passed to the County of Sponheim. In 1158, Hargesheim had its first documentary mention in a directory of landholds kept by Rupertsberg Abbey (see image at right). In 1232, the County of Sponheim was partitioned between two lines of the ruling comital family, and Hargesheim found itself in the “Further” County of Sponheim-Kreuznach. In 1400, the villagers became Ausbürger of the town of Kreuznach, that is to say, citizens of a kind with some of the attendant rights, even though they did not live within the town's zone of jurisdiction. The town granted them protection and freed them from the customary gate toll levied on visitors to the town. Against this favour, the town also demanded that the villagers provide manual labour and draught animals for the town's wall-building project. In 1601, after many disagreements over inheritance among members of the House of Sponheim, Hargesheim passed to the Oberamt of Kreuznach, whose seat was at Castle Kauzenburg (nowadays a ruin in nearby Bad Kreuznach). In 1622, Saint Valentine's Chapel in Hargesheim was destroyed in a blaze. In 1707, the village, together with Kreuznach, passed to the Electorate of the Palatinate. In 1723, there were 18 families living in Hargesheim, 10 Reformed, 4 Catholic and 4 Lutheran. In 1725, a great, frightful storm struck the region. In 1730, building work began on the Catholic church, while work was likewise begun on what is now the Protestant church the following year. By 1799, Hargesheim lay under French rule after French Revolutionary troops had overrun and occupied the German lands on the Rhine’s left bank. The village was part of the Mairie (“Mayoralty”) of Mandel. From 1801 to 1814 – Napoleonic times – Hargesheim belonged to the Department of Rhin-et-Moselle in the First French Empire. In 1816, after Napoleon's downfall and the imposition of a new political order on Europe by the Congress of Vienna, Hargesheim passed to the Kingdom of Prussia, within which a new administrative régime also put it in the Kreuznach district. In 1868, the school house was built at the church; this building still stands and has since become the municipal hall. In 1876, the two churches’ shared churchyard was closed as a graveyard, and a new graveyard was then laid out in the cadastral area known as “Auf dem Neunmorgen”. Over the years that followed, a number of foundings took place: in 1879, the warriors’ association; in 1887, the “Harmonie” singing club; in 1891, the schoolchildren's orchestra; in 1894, the “Concordia” singing club. In 1896, the Kleinbahn, a narrow-gauge railway, came into service. In 1900, Hargesheim had 840 inhabitants, 477 Evangelical, 354 Catholic and 9 Jewish. In 1903, the volunteer fire brigade was founded, as was the Catholic men's club. In 1908, the warriors’ memorial on Lindenstraße was dedicated. In 1910, the gymnastics and sport club was founded, and the following year saw the dedication of the new schoolhouse on Hunsrückstraße. The early years of the 20th century also saw the arrival of important infrastructure in Hargesheim, a watermain in 1912 and electric light in 1913. In 1922, four years after the First World War, the monument to the fallen was dedicated at the graveyard. In 1929, the winegrowers’ association was founded. In 1930, President of Germany Paul von Hindenburg was heartily greeted as he was driven through the village. Hindenburg would soon afterwards play no small part in Adolf Hitler’s rise to power, signing both the Reichstag Fire Decree and the Enabling Act in 1933, bringing an end to the Weimar Republic, whose head of state he himself had been, and making Hitler Germany’s dictator. In 1936, the Kleinbahn ceased operations. Passenger services were replaced with buses. Late in the Second World War, in 1945, Hargesheim found itself in the midst of an air raid. Five houses were destroyed while several others sustained damage. Moreover, one person was killed. On 17 March of that same year, the first American tank rolled through the village. The social advocacy organization VdK set up a local chapter in Hargesheim in 1948. In 1954, owing to Hargesheim’s losses in the Second World War, the war memorial at the graveyard was expanded. That same year, the Catholic church choir was newly founded. In 1955, all the village’s streets were paved with blacktop. In 1958, the new school on Schulstraße was dedicated. The countrywomen’s union was founded in 1959. The mortuary at the graveyard came into service. On 17 June 1966, a heavy storm struck Hargesheim. In 1968, the German Red Cross set up a local chapter in the village. In 1969, the Gräfenbachhalle (multipurpose hall) was dedicated. In 1971, Saint Bernard’s Church (St. Bernhard-Kirche) was consecrated. In 1972, the “Garden Friends” club was founded. In 1973, the old bridge across the Gräfenbach was widened. In 1976, the Evangelical parish hall came into service, and a new water cistern was built up on the Straußberg. Also that year, the marching band was founded and the high school, the Alfred-Delp-Schule Hargesheim, was opened. The year 1978 saw the first fools’ session of the “Harmo-Cordia”, this being a Shrovetide Carnival (Fastnacht) event. Also in 1978, work began on laying sewerage in Hargesheim and the first medical practice opened its doors. In 1979, the Lindenbrunnen fountain was dedicated. In 1980, the gymnastic and sport club dedicated a new clubhouse on the Wiesberg. In 1982, the kindergarten was dedicated. In 1984, the municipal hall, formerly a schoolhouse, acquired its new use. In 1986, in recognition of economic conditions that had shifted over the years, a tourism association was founded; Hargesheim is now a state-recognized tourism community. Also in that year, a village fountain was dedicated on Backesgasse, a town partnership was established with Oetz in the Austrian Tyrol, the limetree boulevard was newly planted and the former mayor Fuchs was made an honorary citizen of Hargesheim. In 1987, a dentistry practice opened in the “Oberwiese” (literally “Upper Meadow”). The embankment formerly used by the long-vanished Kleinbahn was converted into a cycle path. In 1990, the new village square on Schulstraße was dedicated.

=== Population development ===
Hargesheim's population development since the late 18th century is shown in the table below. The figures for the years from 1871 to 1987 are drawn from census data:

Year	Inhabitants
1788	168
1815	212
1835	440
1871	574
1905	892
1939	886

Year	Inhabitants
1950	946
1961	1,219
1970	1,909
1987	2,443
2003	2,947
2008	2,854

== Religion ==
As at 30 September 2013, there are 2,827 full-time residents in Hargesheim, and of those, 1,220 belong to the Evangelical Church in Germany (43.155%), 1,090 are Catholic (38.557%), 1 belongs to the Free Evangelical Church (0.035%), 1 is Lutheran (0.035%), 58 (2.052%) belong to other religious groups and 457 (16.166%) either have no religion or will not reveal their religious affiliation.

== Politics ==
=== Municipal council ===
The council is made up of 20 council members, who were elected by personalized proportional representation at the municipal election held on 7 June 2009, and the honorary mayor as chairman. The municipal election held on 7 June 2009 yielded the following results:

Year	SPD	CDU	FDP	FWG	BfH	Total
2009	6	7	-	4	3	20 seats
2004	7	6	3	4	-	20 seats

=== Mayor ===
Hargesheim's mayor is Haiko Grün.

=== Coat of arms ===
The German blazon reads: Das Wappen zeigt ein blau-goldenes Schachbrett, rechts oben ein blaues Freiviertel mit goldenem Abtstab und goldnem überlaufendem Wasserbecher.

The municipality's arms might in English heraldic language be described thus: Chequy azure and Or a quarter of the first in which issuant from sinister base an abbot's staff bendwise of the second below which a cup of the second running over to sinister, the water argent.

The “chequy” field is a reference to the village's former allegiance, until 1437, to the County of Sponheim. The charge in the quarter, the abbot's staff, reminds one that the abbot and preacher Bernard of Clairvaux was on the way from Rome to Cologne about 1150 and is also believed to have visited Hildegard of Bingen with whom he was corresponding by letter. Abbot Bernard was the most important monk of the Cistercian order. He is still the local Catholic church's patron saint. The other charge, the overflowing cup, is linked with a local legend. It symbolizes the “Arm Seel”, the former village spring at the “Freier Platz” (square). As to why this spring was so called – it is a form of the German words arme Seele, meaning “poor soul” – there was originally disagreement about what to call it. It was thus decided that it would take its name from the first stranger who drank water from it. One day, a stranger did indeed come along and take a drink from it to quench his thirst. After he had done so, he supposedly said out of joy “Das erquickt die Arm Seel” (“That refreshes the poor soul”).

=== Town partnerships ===
Hargesheim fosters partnerships with the following places:

- Oetz, Tyrol, Austria since 1986
- Carcassonne, France since 2014

== Culture and sightseeing ==
=== Buildings ===
The following are listed buildings or sites in Rhineland-Palatinate’s Directory of Cultural Monuments:

- Hunsrückstraße 58 – school; Heimatstil, about 1910
- Kirchstraße 13/15 – former Catholic church; formerly Saint Valentine’s Simultaneous Church (Simultankirche St. Valentin), Baroque aisleless church, marked 1731
- Lindenstraße – warriors’ memorial 1870–1871; obelisk with medallion bearing Kaiser Wilhelm II's likeness, 1911

=== Clubs ===
Hargesheim has a great number of clubs. Currently active in the municipality are the following:

- Bezirksgruppe Bad Kreuznach der westdeutsche Gesellschaft für Familienkunde e.V. Sitz Köln — Bad Kreuznach Regional Group of the West German Society for Genealogy, seat in Cologne
- Bürger für Hargesheim — "Citizens for Hargesheim" (Free Voters' group)
- CDU Ortsverband — Christian Democratic Union of Germany local chapter
- DRK Ortsverein — German Red Cross local chapter
- Förderverein evangelisches Gemeindehaus — Evangelical parish hall promotional association
- Förderverein Fußball des TSV — football promotional association
- Freiwillige Feuerwehr — volunteer fire brigade
- FWG Ortsverband — Free Voters local chapter
- Gartenfreunde Hargesheim — “garden friends”
- Gesangverein Harmonie — singing club
- Hargesheimer Fassenachtsclub — Shrovetide Carnival (Fastnacht) club
- Hargesheimer Gilde e.V. — ?
- Hargesheimer Hobbyfussballer — “hobby footballers”
- Katholischer Kirchenchor St. Bernhard — Catholic church choir
- Landfreunde Gräfenbachtal — “country friends”
- Maennerkochclub Hargesheim 2001 "Die Dibbe-Gugger" — men's cooking club
- Rollerclub Hargesheim
- SG ADS Hargesheim 1986 e.V. — Alfred Delp School sporting union
- SHG Schlaganfallbetroffener Bad Kreuznach-Hargesheim — self-help group for those affected by stroke
- SPD Ortsverband — Social Democratic Party of Germany local chapter
- St. Sebastianusbruderschaft — Saint Sebastian's brotherhood
- TSV Hargesheim — gymnastic and sport club
- VdK Ortsverein — social advocacy group, local chapter
- Verein "Freunde der Feuerwehr" — "friends of the fire brigade"
- Verein "Freunde der Kinder von Tschernobyl" — "friends of the children from Chernobyl"
- Verkehrsverein Hargesheim — transport club
- Volkshochschule Gräfenbachtal — folk high school

== Economy and infrastructure ==
=== Transport ===
Running through Hargesheim is Landesstraße 236, which just to the south links with Bundesstraße 41, and just beyond to other roads leading into nearby Rüdesheim an der Nahe and the district seat of Bad Kreuznach. Bad Kreuznach station is served by both the Nahe Valley Railway (Bingen–Saarbrücken) and the Alsenz Valley Railway (Alsenztalbahn).

=== Education ===
Hargesheim has one primary school, a daycare centre and the Alfred-Delp-Schule Hargesheim, a coöperative comprehensive school, with separate streams, including a Gymnasium upper level (Mainzer Studienstufe).
