= Zwölferkogel (Stubai Alps) =

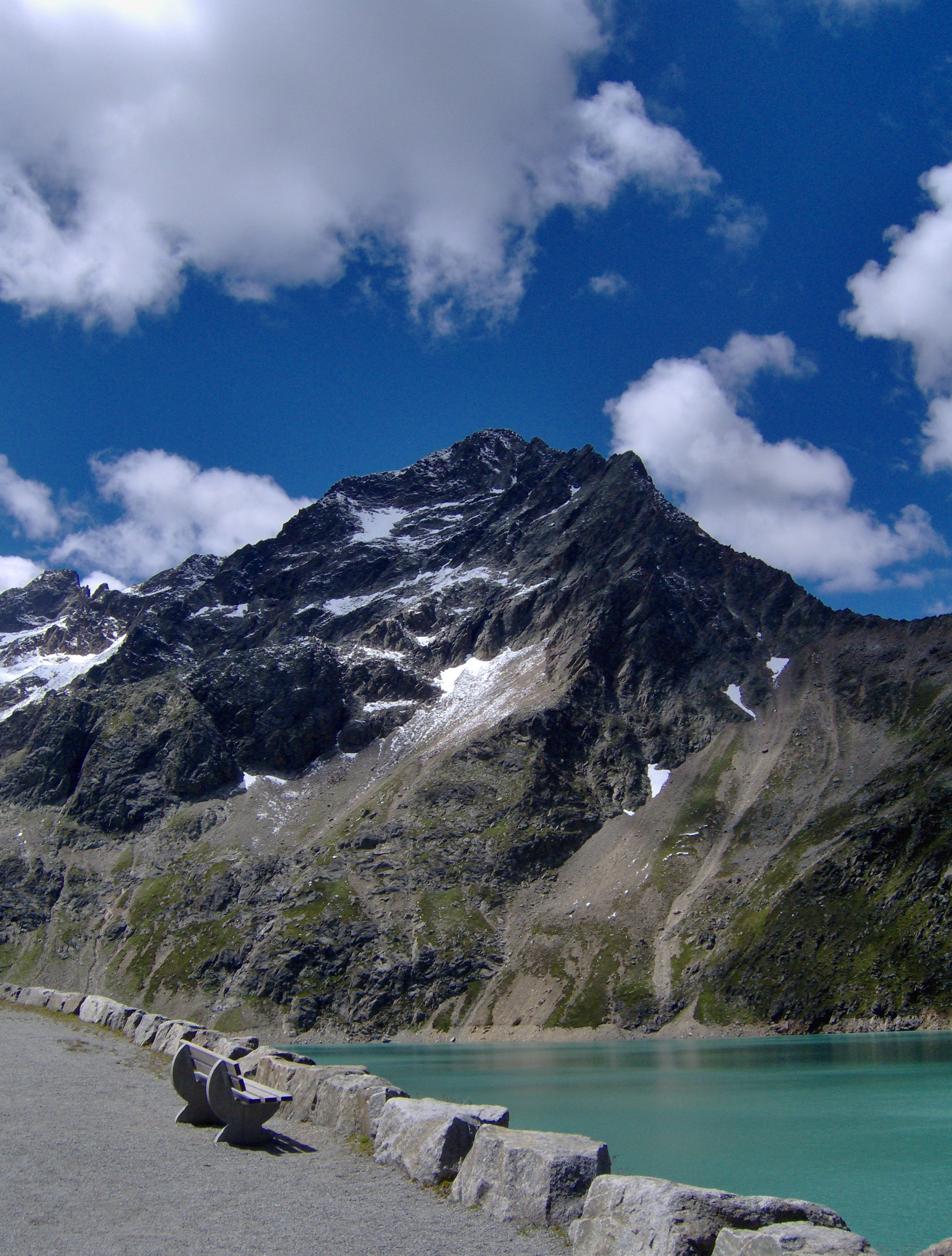
- The Zwölferkogel from the northeast

Highest point
- Elevation: 2,988 m (AA) (9,803 ft)
- Isolation: 0.8 km → Sulzkogel
- Coordinates: 47°11′24″N 11°00′37″E

Geography
- Location within Austria
- Location: South of Kühtai/Tyrol
- Parent range: Stubai Alps

Geology
- Mountain type: Rock summit
- Rock type: Gneiss

Climbing
- Normal route: From Kühtai through the Finstertal valley up the southeast flank or along the Langental valley and via the Zwölferkar cirque

The Zwölferkogel is a mountain, 2,988 m (AA), in the Stubai Alps in the Austrian state of Tyrol.

== Topography ==
The Zwölferkogel lies about 2.7 kilometres south of the winter sport resort of Kühtai. The northwest face of the Zwölferkogel falls around 500 metres into the Längental valley. To the east below the Finstertal is the Finstertalspeicher, a reservoir belonging to the Sellrain-Silz Power Station. To the south, along a sharp arête, are the Mittagsköpfe (2,934 m (AA)), the Mittagsturm tower (2,929 m (AA)) and the Sulzkogel (3,016 m (AA)).

== Gallery ==
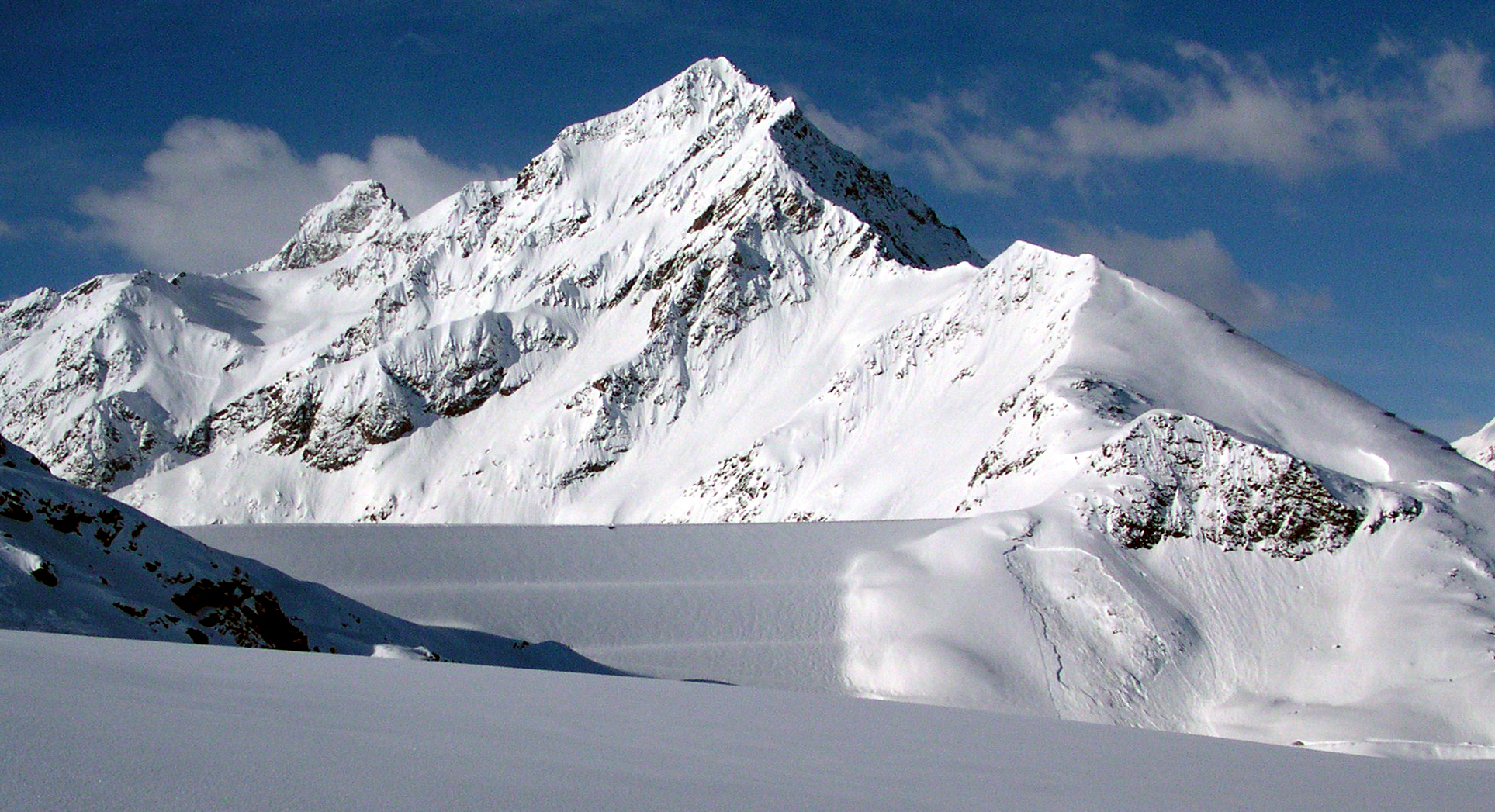
The Zwölferkogel behind the dam wall of the Finstertalspeicher

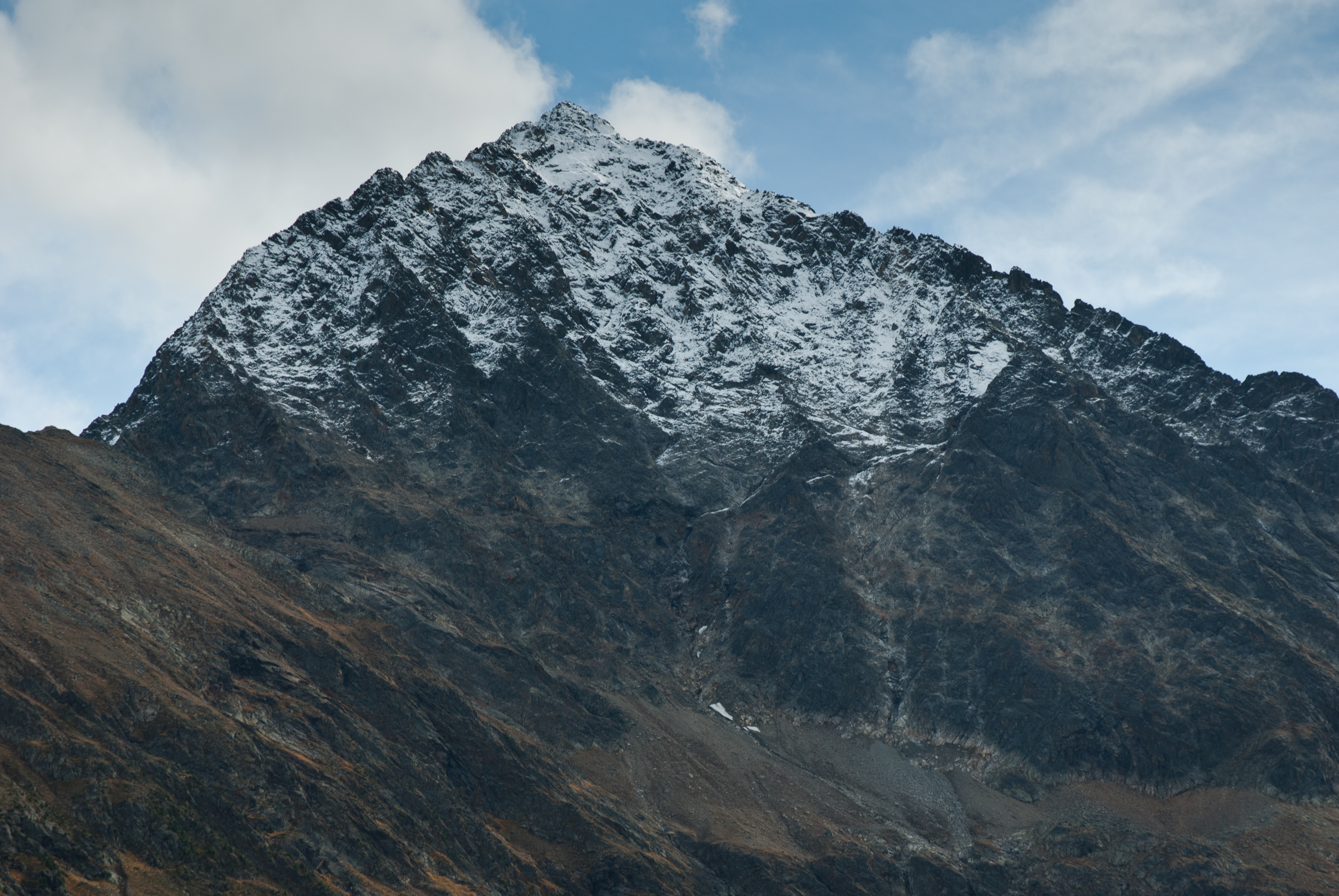
The Zwölferkogel
