= Gleirscher Rosskogel =

Mountain in Austria

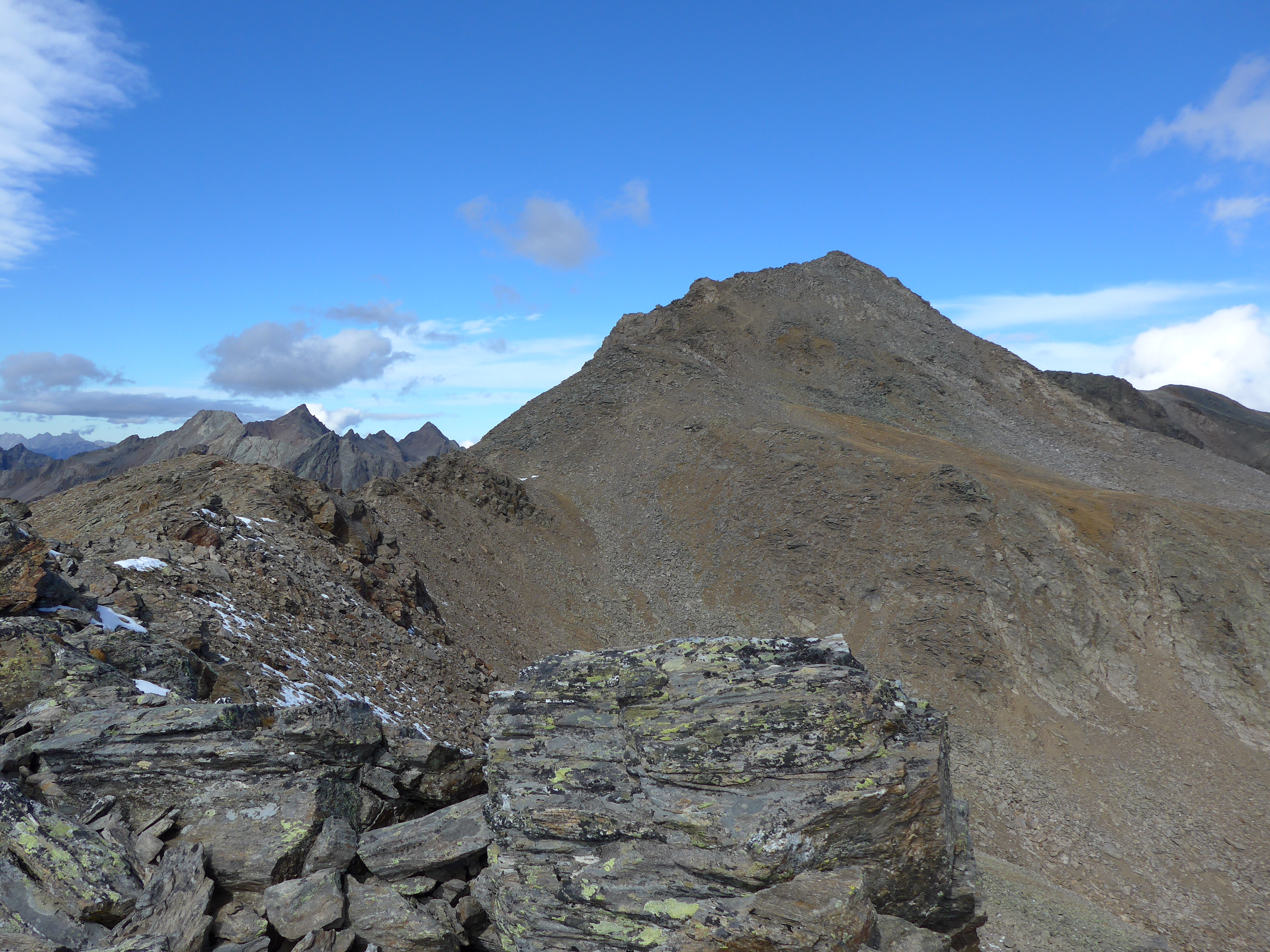
- The Gleirscher Rosskogel seen from the shoulder of the southeast arête along which the normal route runs.

Highest point
- Elevation: 2,994 m (AA) (9,823 ft)
- Prominence: 48 m
- Isolation: 0.4 km → Zwieselbacher Rosskogel
- Coordinates: 47°09′25″N 11°02′58″E

Geography
- Location within Austria
- Location: Tyrol, Austria
- Parent range: Stubai Alps

Climbing
- Normal route: From the Schweinfurter Hut or the New Pforzheim Hut via the Gleirschrjöchl col and southern arête.

The Gleirscher Rosskogel (2,994 m (AA)) is a mountain in the northern Stubai Alps in the Austrian state of Tyrol. It is not particularly independent, because about 750 metres to the north rises the higher summit of the Zwieselbacher Rosskogel (3,081 m). Formerly the 3,008 spot height on the arête between the two peaks was named as the Gleirscher Rosskogel, and this is still the case on many maps; in which case the present Gleirscher Rosskogel would then be called the Gleirscher Rosskopf. At the top is a small metal summit cross with a plaque inscribed with the present name of the peak and an elevation of 2,950 m.

== Location ==
The Gleirscher Rosskogel is situated on the crest between the Zwieselbach valley (Zwieselbachtal) to the west as the Gleirsch valley (Gleirschtal) to the east. The former is a side valley of the Horlach valley (Horlachtal) which opens into the Ötztal below Niederthai. The Gleirsch is a side valley of the Sellrain. The lowest point of the north-south ridge between the Zwieselbacher and Gleirscher Rosskogel is at a height of 2,946 m. Southeast of the summit is the col of Gleischrjöchl (2,750 m), which separates the Gleirscher Rosskogel from the Schartkopf (2,831 m), also called the Samerschlag, and the Zwieselbacher Grießkogel (3,066 m).

== Ascent options ==
The easiest ascent option is via the col of Gleischrjöchl southeast of the summit. This may be reached either from the Schweinfurter Hut to the west or the New Pforzheim Hut to the east. From the col the route runs northwest over a flat arête shoulder to the top. From the Pforzheim Hut it takes about 2½ hours to the top, from the Schweinfurter Hut it is just under 2¾ hours. The whole route from both huts is waymarked.

A crossing from the Gleirscher Rosskogel to the Zwieselbacher Rosskogel, 750 metres north, is also possible. The most difficult section of the ridge, especially the steep step immediately south of the main peak was made safer in 2010 by members of the Pforzheim Branch of the Alpine Club by the installation of appropriate climbing aids. In addition, th route is marked as the Via Mandani throughout. In spite of the climbing aids the arête, which is rather exposed in places, requires grade II climbing on the UIAA scale.

The Gleirscher Rosskogel may also be climbed as part of a ski tour, but is not as popular as its northern neighbour, the Zwieselbacher Rosskogel. The Gleirscher Rosskogel is usually approached from St. Sigmund im Sellrain via the Pforzheimer Hut and the col immediately north of the summit and not via the Gleischrjöchl as in summer.

== Literature and maps ==
- Walter Klier: Alpine Club Guide Stubaier Alpen. Bergverlag Rudolf Rother, Munich, 2006, ISBN 3-7633-1271-4
- Alpine Club map Sheet 31/2, 1:25,000, Stubaier Alpen; Sellrain. ISBN 3-928777-73-4
