= Zwieselbacher Rosskogel =

Double peak in Austria

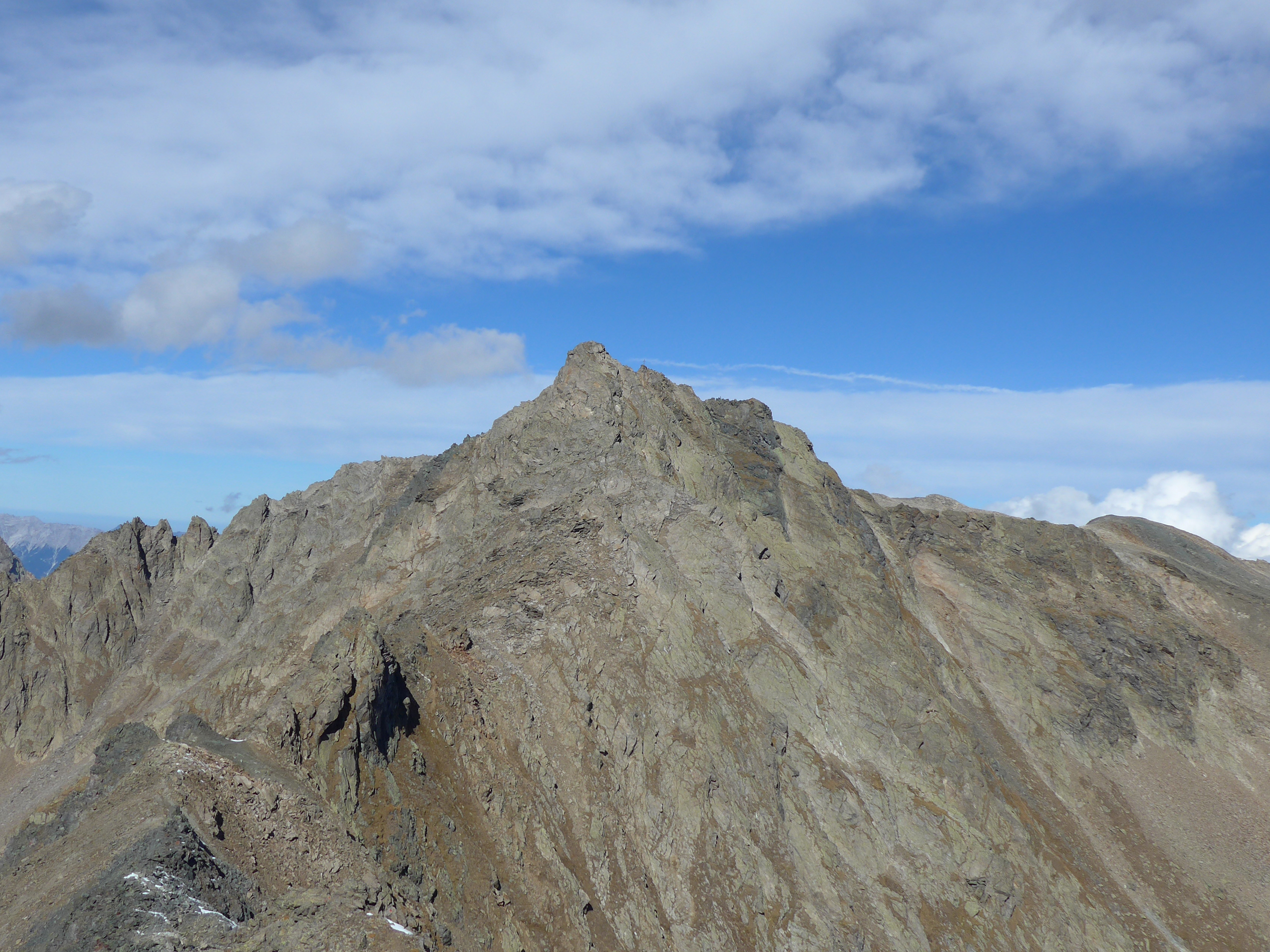
- The Zwieselbacher Rosskogel from the Gleirscher Rosskogel to the south. To the right of the main summit is the north top which bears a summit cross.

Highest point
- Elevation: 3,081 m (AA) (10,108 ft)
- Prominence: 330 m ↓ Gleirschjöchl
- Isolation: 3.7 km → Vordere Sonnenwand
- Listing: Alpine mountains above 3000 m
- Coordinates: 47°09′46″N 11°02′51″E

Geography
- Location within Austria
- Location: Tyrol, Austria
- Parent range: Stubai Alps

Climbing
- First ascent: 23 August 1881 by Ludwig Purtscheller and Franz Schnaiter (touristically)
- Normal route: From the Schweinfurter Hut or the Neue Pforzheimer Hut via the col immediately north of the summit.

The Zwieselbacher Rosskogel (3,081 m (AA) or 3,082 m (AA)) is a double peak in the northern Stubai Alps in the Austrian state of Tyrol. Its summit offers a sweeping panorama to the north because no other higher mountains impede the view. To the south, by contrast, the view is restricted by higher summits in the Stubai Alps. The first well known ascent took place on 23 August 1881 by Ludwig Purtscheller accompanied by chamois hunter Franz Schnaiter from Zirl.

== Location and surrounding area ==
The Zwieselbacher Rosskogel is situated in the area of three high valleys: north of the summit is the Kraspes valley (Kraspestal) and, to the east, is the Gleirsch valley (Gleischtal), both side valleys of the Sellrain. To the west of the mountain lies the Zwiselbach valley (Zwiselbachtal), a side valley of the Horlach valley (Horlachtal), which, in turn, opens at Niederthai into the Ötztal valley. From the crest that runs from north to south separating the Zwieselbach and Gleirsch valleys, a side ridge branches off at the Zwieselbacher Rosskogel in a northeasterly direction on which another three-thousander rises just under one kilometre away, the Rotgrubenspitze (3,040 m). On the ridge north of the summit are the peaks of the Weitkarspitzen (up to 2,947 m) and the Kraspesspitze (2,954 m). On the prominent arête to the south at a distance of about 750 metres is another striking peak, the Gleirscher Rosskogel (2,994 m).

Nestling between the ridges that head north and northeast is the small glacier, the Kraspesferner, which had an area of 0.69 km² in 1969, but which has been badly affected by glacial retreat.

== Ascent options ==
A waymarked mountain path runs over the plateau-like col immediately north of the summit between the Zwieselbacher Rosskogel and Weitkarspitzen. This path serves as a crossing from the Schweinfurter Hut in the west and the New Pforzheim Hut in the east. From this saddle the somewhat lower north top (about 3,070 m), which bears the summit cross, may be reached in just a few minutes. The equally very short crossing from the north summit to the slightly higher south top requires some easy climbing. From either hut one needs about 3 hours in order to gain the summit.

Another varied option is an ascent along the southern arête from the col of Gleirscher Jöchl (2,750 m) via the Gleirscher Rosskogel. It was on this route that the first climbers, Purtscheller and Schnaiter, reached the top. The most difficult section of the ridge, especially the steep step immediately south of the main peak was made safer in 2010 by members of the Pforzheim Branch of the Alpine Club by the installation of appropriate climbing aids. In addition, the route is marked as the Via Mandani throughout. In spite of the climbing aids the arête, which is rather exposed in places, requires grade II climbing on the UIAA scale.

The Zwieselbacher Rosskogel is very popular as a ski tour and there are numerous routes. It is usually approached from the north, from Haggen through the Krapses valley.

== Literature and maps ==
- Walter Klier: Alpine Club Guide Stubaier Alpen. Bergverlag Rudolf Rother, Munich, 2006, ISBN 3-7633-1271-4
- Alpine Club map Sheet 31/2, 1:25,000, Stubaier Alpen; Sellrain. ISBN 3-928777-73-4
