= Kühtai =

- village
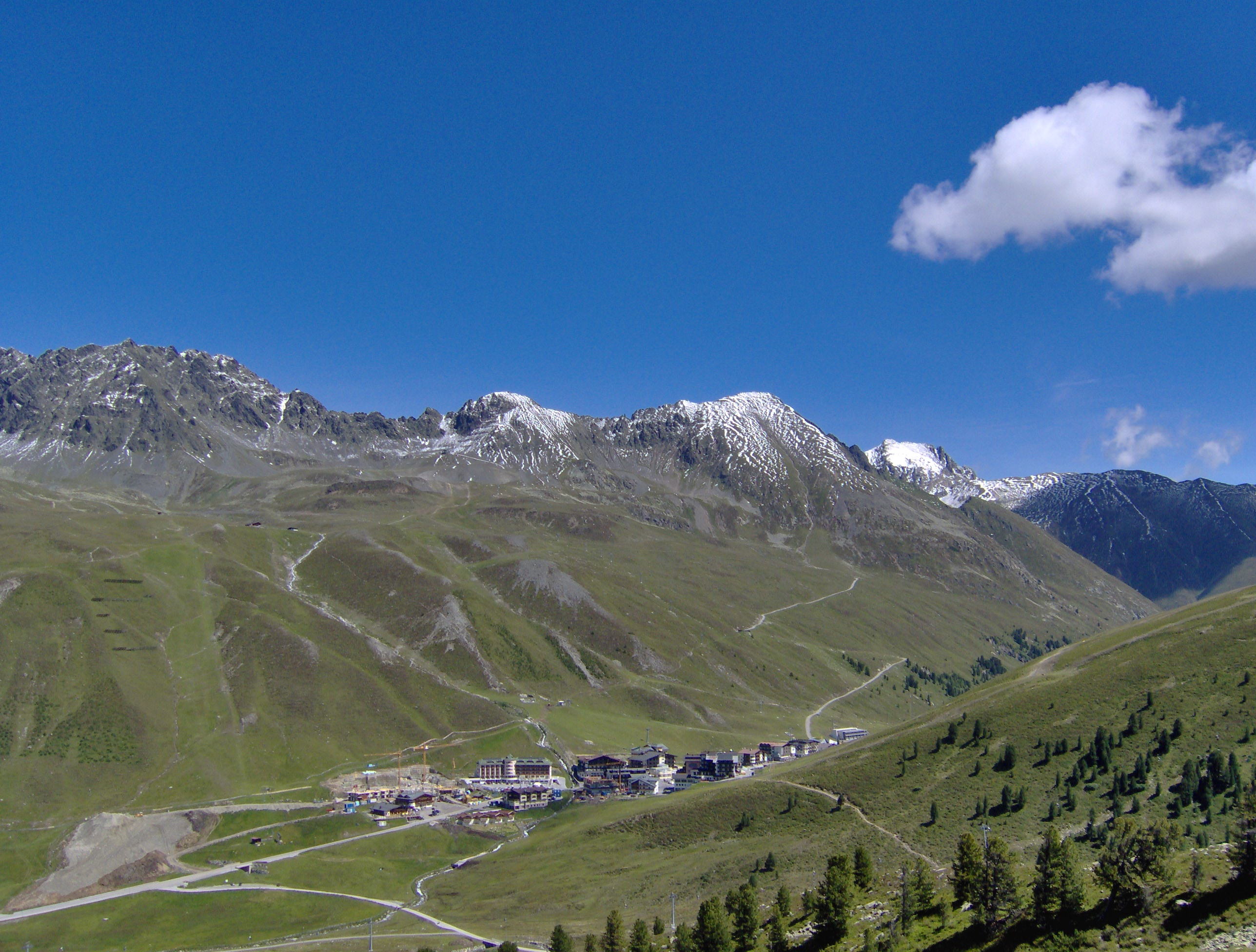
- Kühtai
- Interactive map of Kühtai
- Coordinates: 47°12′49″N 11°01′24″E
- Elevation: 2,017 m (6,617 ft)

Population
  - Total: 29
- Postal code: 6183
- Area code: 5239

Kühtai is a winter sports village in the Stubai Alps on the Kühtai Saddle between the Nedertal valley in the west and the Sellrain valley in the east. It is part of the municipality of Silz, in the district of Imst, in the Austrian state of Tyrol.

== Location and population ==
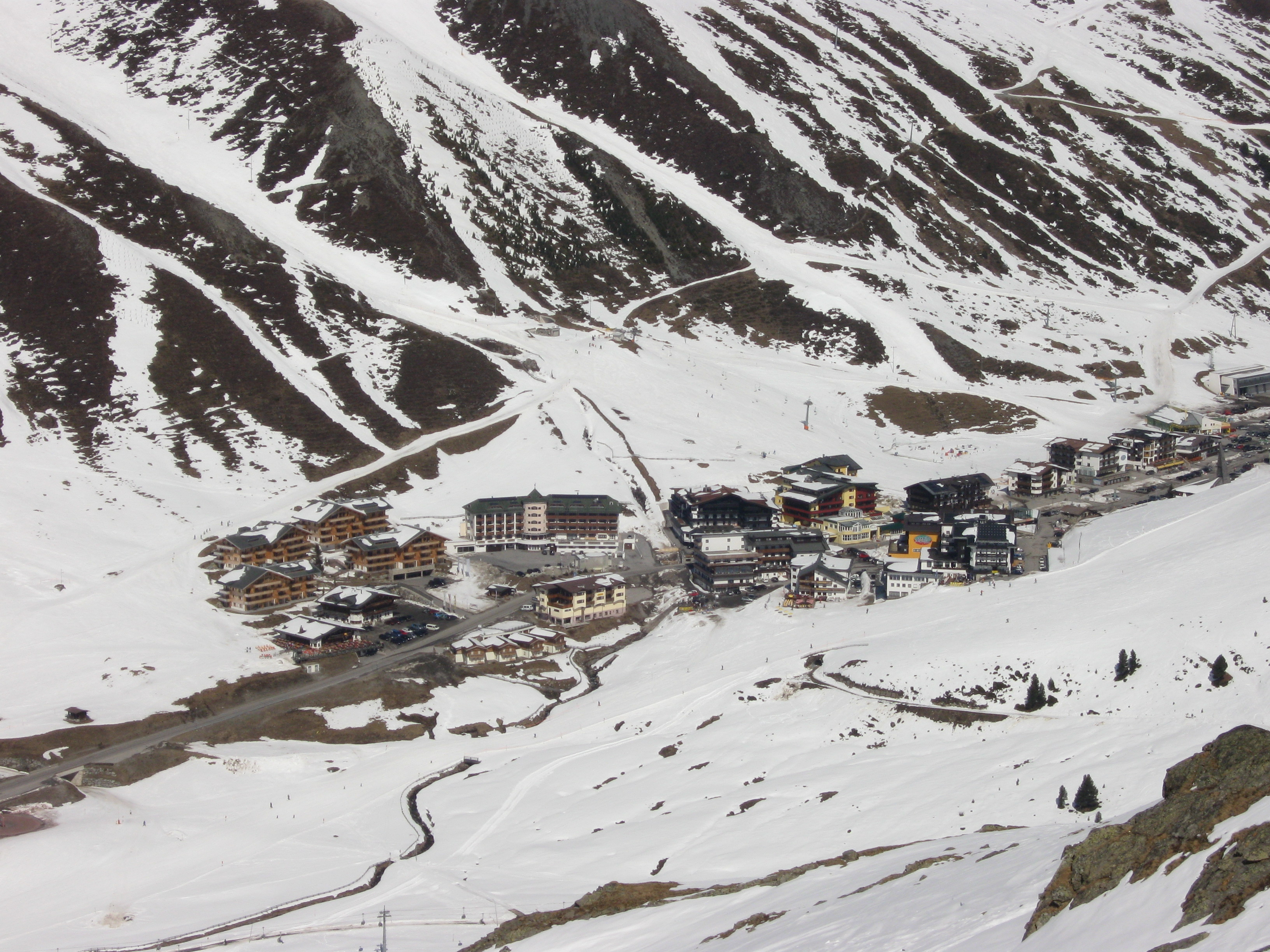
The village of Silz and winter sport resort of Kühtai

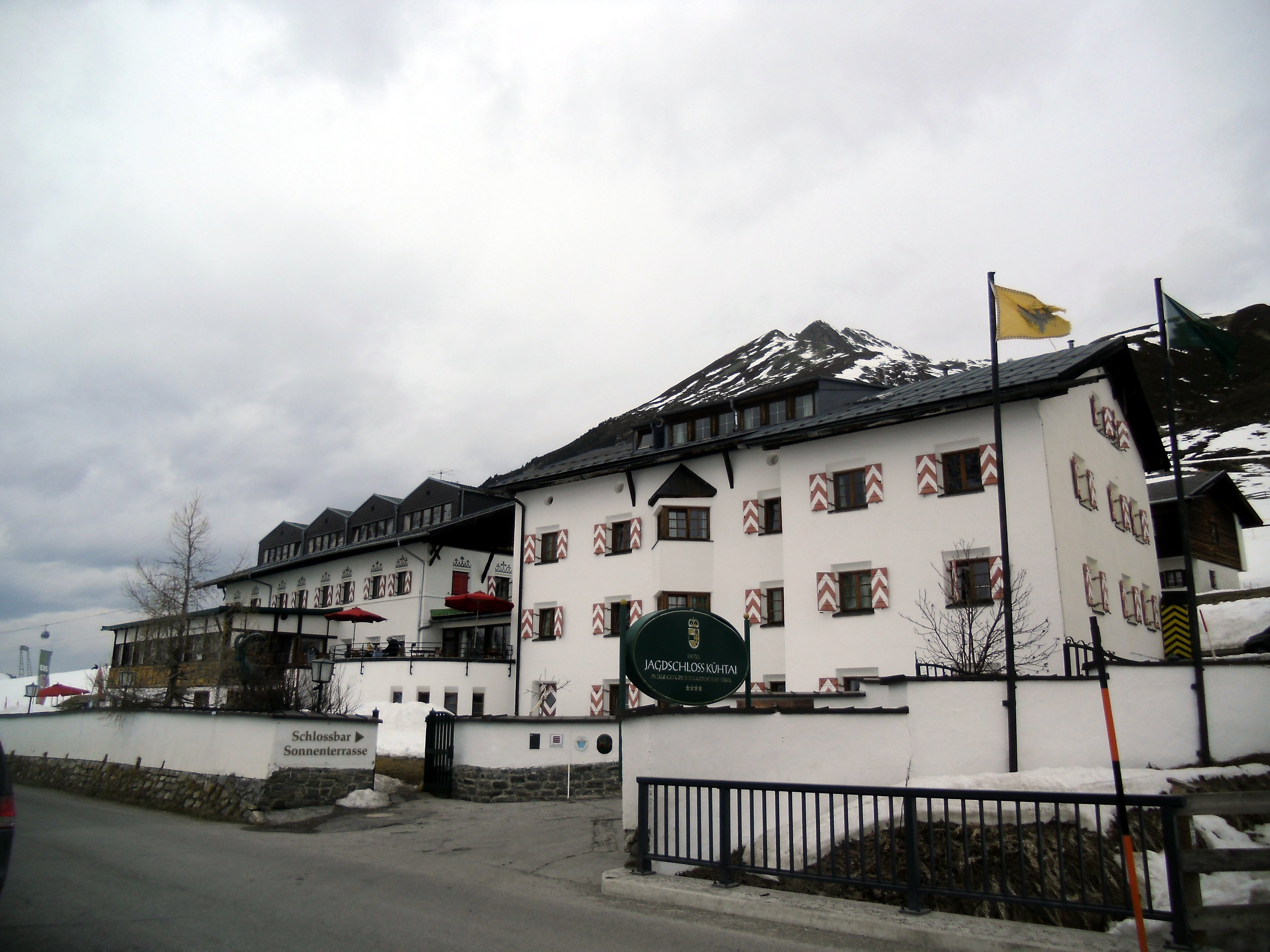
The 1622 hunting lodge (left) with a new building (right)

The village is located at a height of around 2,020 metres and is one of the highest ski resorts in Austria.

== History ==
Originally there was a schwaighof here, the Chutay ("cow alp"). This was first mentioned around 1280 in an urbarium of the counts of Tyrol. In 1497 the later Emperor Maximilian I was give the right to hunt in the area of the Kühtai. In 1622, Archduke Leopold V had the schwaighof converted into a hunting lodge and, in 1624, a road was built from Sellrain. Emperor Franz Joseph I bought the hunting lodge back in 1893 and used it as a base for hunting Alpine marmots. The property passed via his granddaughter, Hedwig to the counts of Stolberg-Stolberg, who turned it into a winter sports hotel. In 2016 it was modernised by its new owners.

As early as the 1930s climbers and summer holidaymakers stayed at Kühtai. The hunting lodge was converted in the 19th century into a schloss hotel. The increasing number of skiers in the early 20th century soon reached Austria-Hungary and, along with that, the Kühtai. Under the direction of the k.u.k. Works and Farming Ministry (Arbeits- und Ackerbauministerium) the place was opened up as a ski resort in 1909. After the Second World War, Kühtai grew rapidly into a hotel village and is today a popular hiking and skiing area. In 1976/77 the church was built.

In the course of the 2012 Winter Youth Olympics, the village hosted snowboarding and freestyle competitions. At the end of December 2014, the women's 2014/15 Alpine Ski World Cup took place here for the first time (as a replacement for the cancelled competition in Semmering).

== Culture and sights ==
- Kühtai Church: the Expositurkirche Kühtai
- Kühtai Hunting Lodge (Jagdschloss Kühtai) and Kühtai Royal Chapel (Hofkapelle Kühtai)
