= Burgstall (disambiguation) =

A burgstall is a German term referring to a castle of which so little is left that its appearance cannot effectively be reconstructed.

Burgstall may also refer to:

== Inhabited places ==
=== Austria ===
- Burgstall, a village in Hermagor-Pressegger See, Hermagor, Carinthia
- Groß Burgstall, a village in Sankt Bernhard-Frauenhofen, Jorn, Lower Austria
- Klein-Burgstall, a village in Maissau, Hollabrunn, Lower Austria
- Burgstall, a village in Regau, Vöcklabruck, Upper Austria
- Burgstall (Großklein), a cadastral municipality of Großklein, Leibnitz, Styria

=== Germany ===
- Burgstall, Saxony-Anhalt, a village in Börde, Saxony-Anhalt
- Burgstall an der Murr, a village in Burgstetten, Rems-Murr-Kreis, Baden-Württemberg
- Burgstall (Creglingen), a village in Creglingen, Main-Tauber-Kreis, Baden-Württemberg
- Burgstall (Hirschau), a village in Hirschau, Amberg-Sulzbach, Bavaria

=== Italy ===
- Burgstall, South Tyrol

== Mountains and hills ==
- Hoher Burgstall (Kalkkögel), a mountain in the Kalkkögel in Tyrol, Austria
- Burgstall (Oberpfalz), a summit of the Hoher Bogen, Bavaria, Germany
- Burgstall (Upper Palatinate), a mountain in the Bavarian Forest, Germany

== Other uses ==
- Burgstall, an island in the Abtsdorfer See, Rupertiwinkel, Bavaria, Germany
- Château du Burgstall, a ruined castle in Guebwiller, Haut-Rhin, France

== See also ==
- Burgstaller
