= Château Saint-Léon =

Former castle in Eguisheim, Haut-Rhin, France

Coordinates: 48°02′37″N 7°18′24″E

The Château Saint-Léon is a former castle in the commune of Eguisheim in the Haut-Rhin département of France.

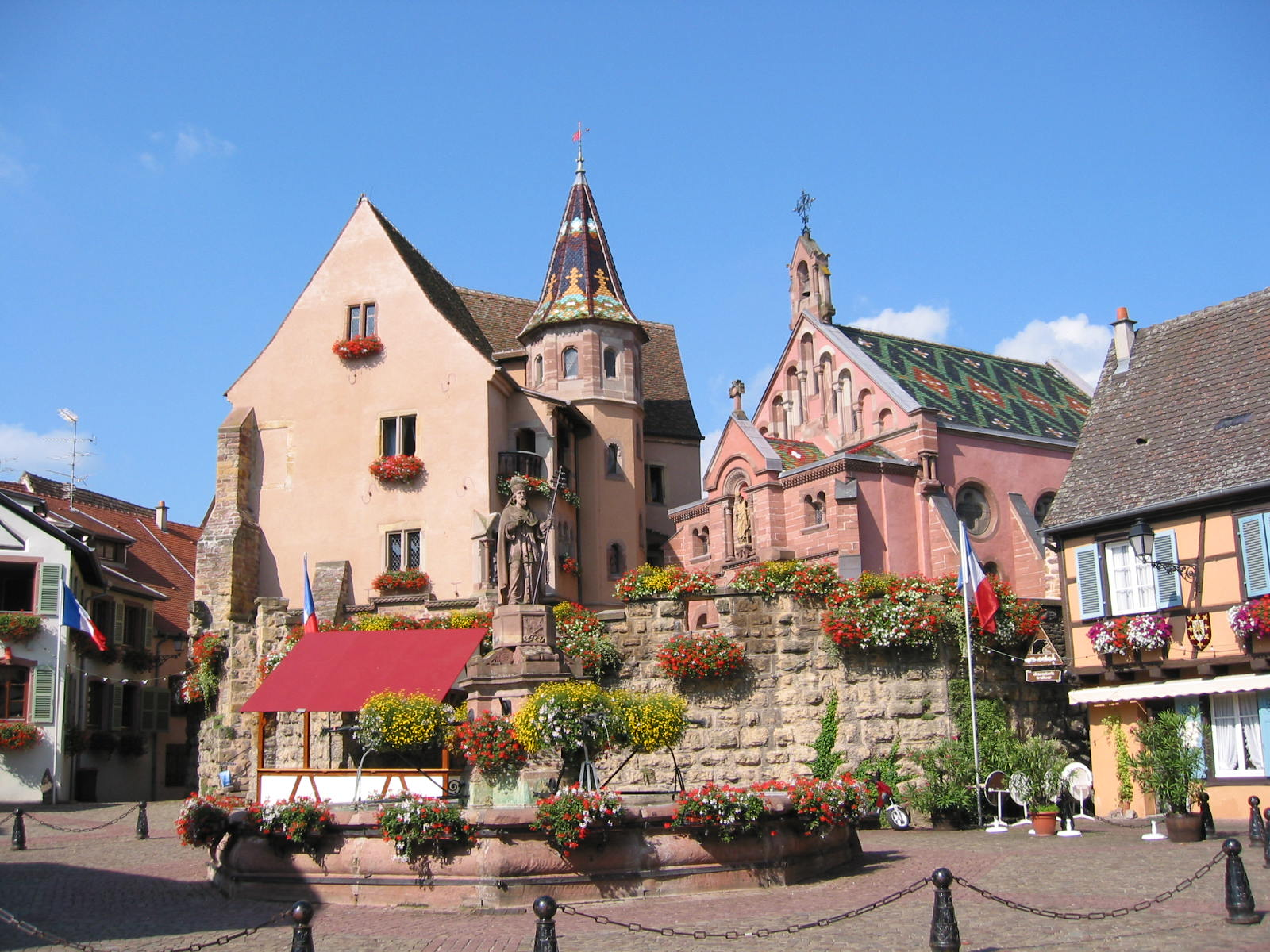
Château Saint-Léon

== History ==
The castle was long believed, mistakenly, to date from the 11th or 12th century. This was because of historians relying on texts actually describing another castle, the Château de Haut Eguisheim, and the birthplace in 1002 of Pope Leo IX (Saint-Léon in French). In fact, the castle's octagonal plan and central keep, its masonry and, most importantly, its similarity to other castles (Château du Burgstall at Guebwiller and the Château de Wangen) date it to the first part of the 13th century.

The castle was built by the Counts of Eguisheim and taken over by the Bishop of Strasbourg during the 13th century. An episcopal bailiff occupied it until the French Revolution (1789). The enceinte was surrounded by a moat which was filled in by the 18th century. Houses built in the castle courtyard and against its walls were destroyed by a fire in 1877 which also damaged the castle - it was left in runs for many years.

In 1885, it was bought by the Bishop of Strasbourg through the mediation of a M. Stumpf who wanted to build a chapel dedicated to Saint Leo. The remains of the keep were destroyed and the chapel built in its place, the works being carried out by the architect of historic monuments, Charles Winkler. The chapel was completed in 1895. Winkler also restored the residence at the south of the site which had been rebuilt, with mullioned windows in the 16th century. He added a staircase turret and a neo-Renaissance balcony.

It has been listed since 1903 as a monument historique by the French Ministry of Culture.

== See also ==
- List of castles in France
