= Observation Tower Rödlas =

- Aussichsturm Rödlas
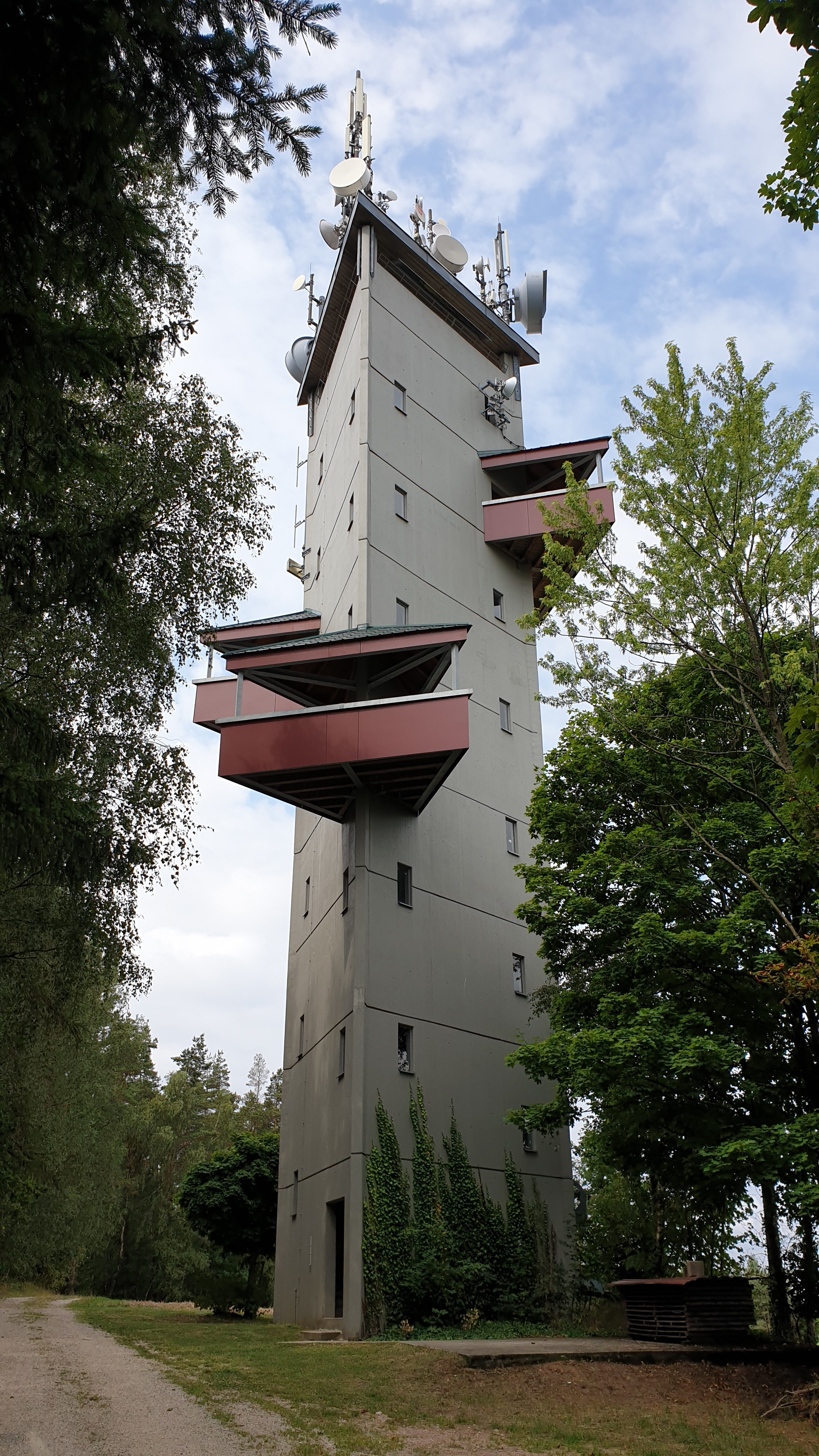
- Interactive map of the Observation Tower Rödlas area

General information
- Location: Hirschau, Germany
- Coordinates: 49°35′23″N 11°57′1″E
- Elevation: 32 m
- Inaugurated: 15 August 1977

Design and construction
- Architect: Xaver Steinkirchner
- Structural engineer: Hans Kohl

The Rödlas observation tower, also called Massenrichter Tower, is an observation tower in the town of Hirschau, Amberg-Sulzbach district, Upper Palatinate, Germany.
