= Janner (surname) =

Janner is a surname. Notable people with the surname include:

- Barnett Janner (1892–1982), British politician
- Ferdinand Janner (1836–1895), German theologian
- Greville Janner (1928–2015), British politician, barrister, and writer
- Laura Janner-Klausner (born 1963), British rabbi
