= Weiher =

Weiher may refer to:

- Weiher (Hirschau), former municipality, now incorporated to Hirschau
- Weyher family
