= Kalkkögel =

Mountain chain of the Stubai Alps, Austria

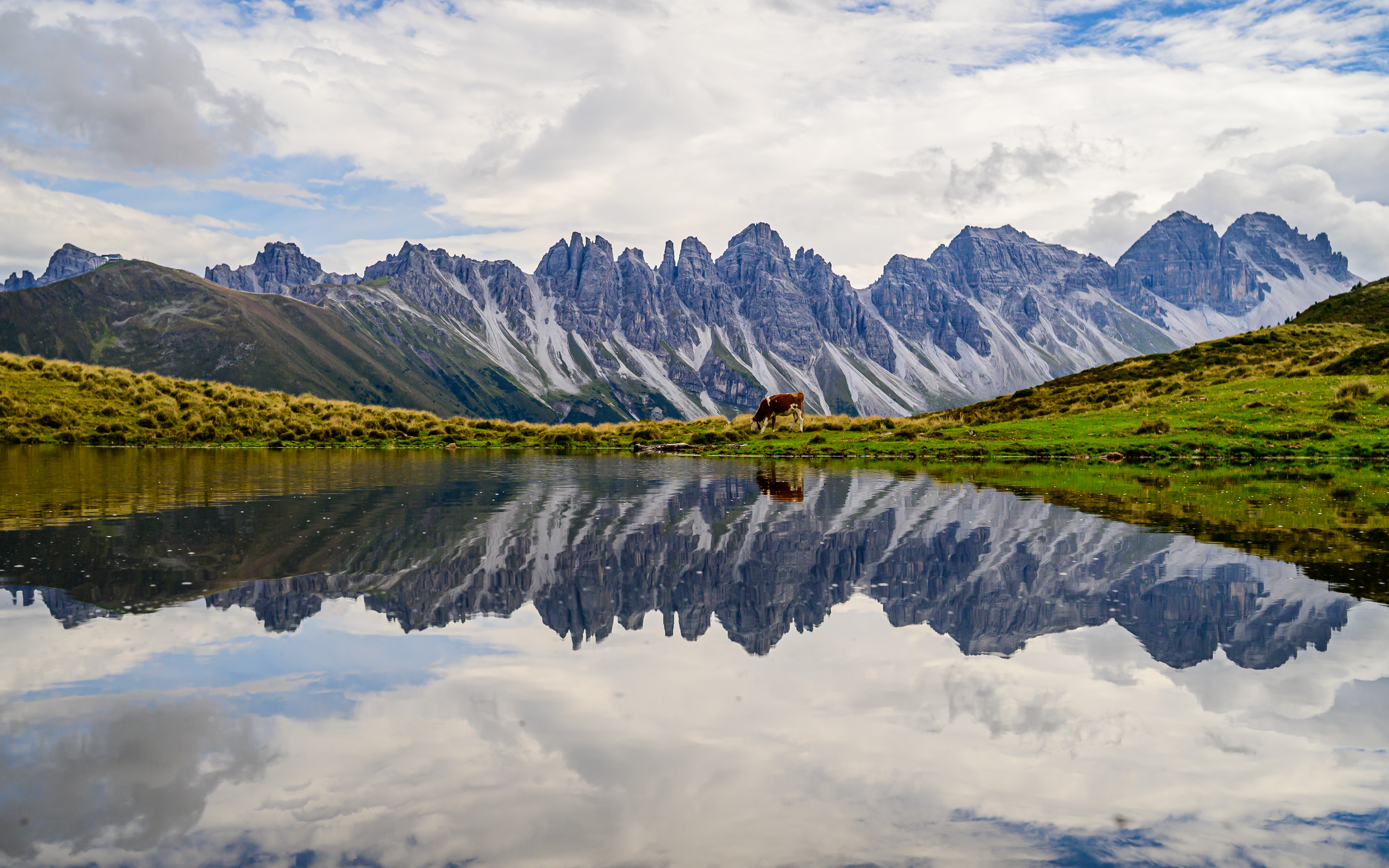
- The Kalkkögel from the northwest, by the Schönangerlsee near Salfeins

Highest point
- Peak: Schlicker Seespitze
- Elevation: 2,804 m above sea level (AA)

Geography
- Location within Austria
- State(s): Tyrol, Austria
- Range coordinates: 47°09′00″N 11°16′00″E
- Parent range: Stubaier Alps

Geology
- Rock age: Triassic
- Rock type: dolomite

The Kalkkögel are a mountain chain that is part of the Stubai Alps in Tyrol, Austria. The highest point of the Kalkkögel is the Schlicker Seespitze which reaches a height of 2,804 m (AA); its easternmost mountain is the Ampferstein. The name is plural.

== Geology ==
The Kalkkögel consist of Mesozoic sediments, like those that occur elsewhere in the Stubai Alps, west of the Wipptal valley, around the Serles crest or in the area of the Tribulaune. In the region of the Kalkkögel, there are sediments from the boundary of the Permian-Triassic to the Norian of the upper Triassic, which lie on its crystalline bedrock.

For the most part, however, these sediments consist of dolomites of the middle and upper Triassic. These dolomites are separated into a lower and upper dolomite by a ten-metre-thick band of slightly metamorphosed slates, the so-called Raibler beds.

Although this layer is thin, it produces a clear morphological division. At the bottom of the Mesozoic sediments is a sequence of conglomerates and sandstones.

In this layer, which is at most a few tens of metres thick, are iron ore deposits, the most important of which were quarried south of the Burgstall and was the basis of the tool industry in the Stubaital that still exists today. The external appearance of the Kalkkögel resembles the Dolomites, which is why they are often referred to as "North Tyrolean Dolomites".

== Individual peaks in the Kalkkögel ==
- Saile
- Ampferstein
- Marchreisenspitze
- Malgrubenspitze
- Hochtennspitze
- Steingrubenwand und Schlicker Zinnen
- Steingrubenkogel
- Kleine Ochsenwand
- Große Ochsenwand
- Riepenwand
- Schlicker Seespitze
- Widdersberg
- Schneiderspitze
- Hoher Burgstall
- Niederer Burgstall
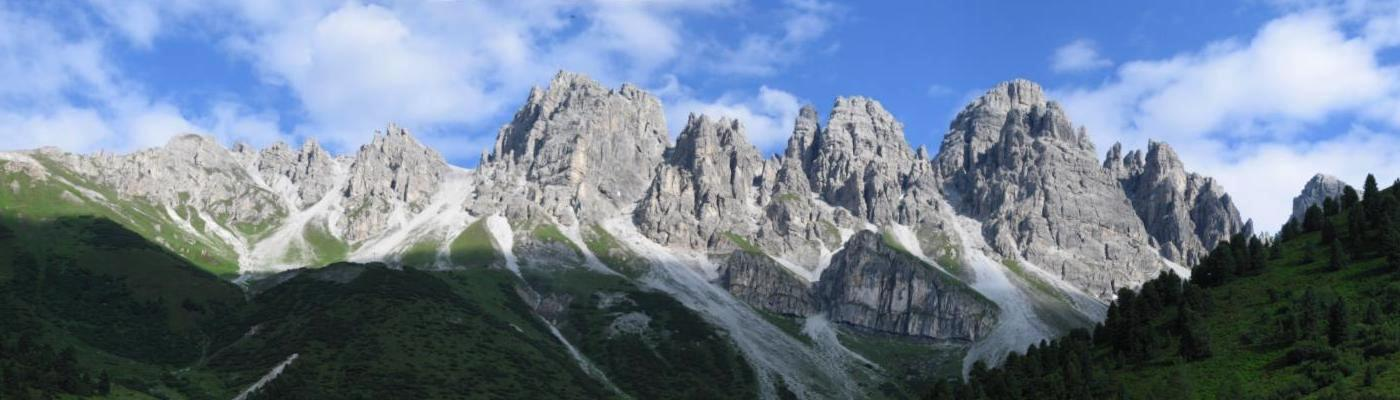
North flank of the Kalkkögel seen from the Kemater Alm (Senderstal)
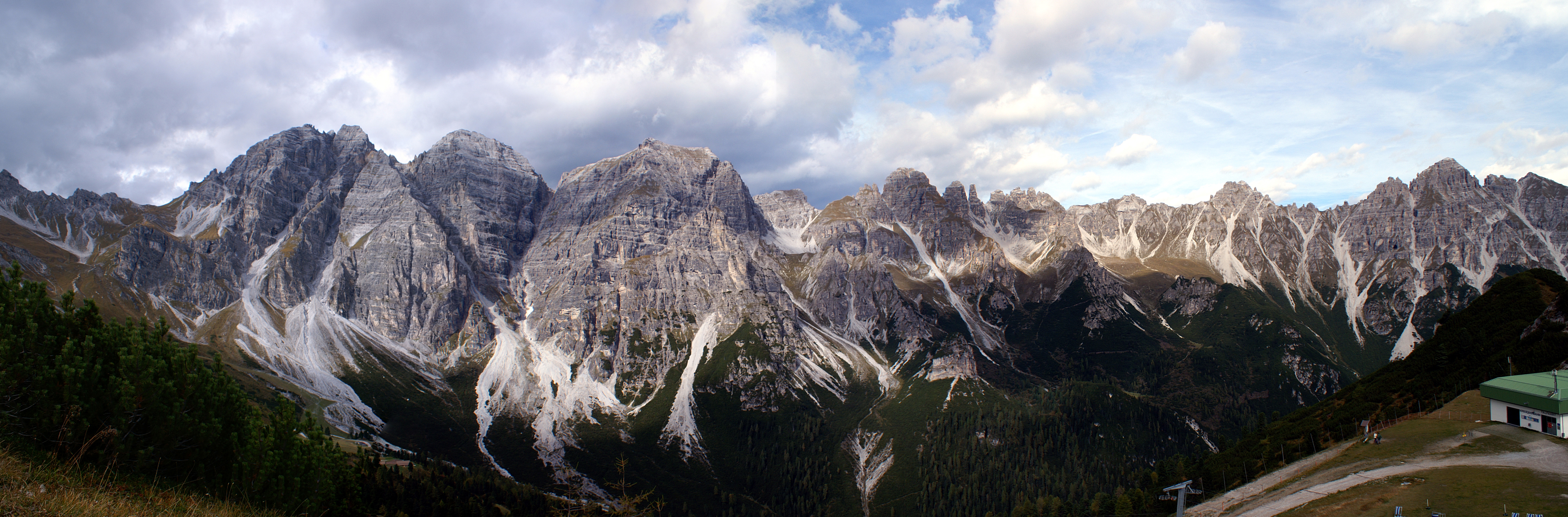
South flank of the Kalkkögel, seen from Kreuzjoch

== Literature ==
- Walter Klier (2006), Alpenvereinsführer Stubaier Alpen alpin (in German) (13th ed.), Munich: Bergverlag Rudolf Rother, ISBN 3-7633-1271-4
