= Ehenfeld =

Former municipality in Bavaria, Germany

- Ortsteil of Stadt Hirschau
- Interactive map of Ehenfeld
- Location within Germany Location within Bavaria
- Coordinates: 49°34′44″N 11°56′32″E
- Country: Germany
- State: Bavaria
- Admin. region: Upper Palatinate
- District: Amberg-sulzbach
- Municipality: Stadt Hirschau
- Elevation: 453 m (1,486 ft)
- Time zone: UTC+01:00 (CET)
  - Summer (DST): UTC+02:00 (CEST)
- Postal codes: 92242

Ehenfeld is a former municipality in the today's municipality of Hirschau in the district of Amberg-Sulzbach in Bavaria, Germany. On 1 January 1971 Ehenfeld was incorporated to Hirschau.
