= Hoher Burgstall (Kalkkögel) =

Mountain in Austria

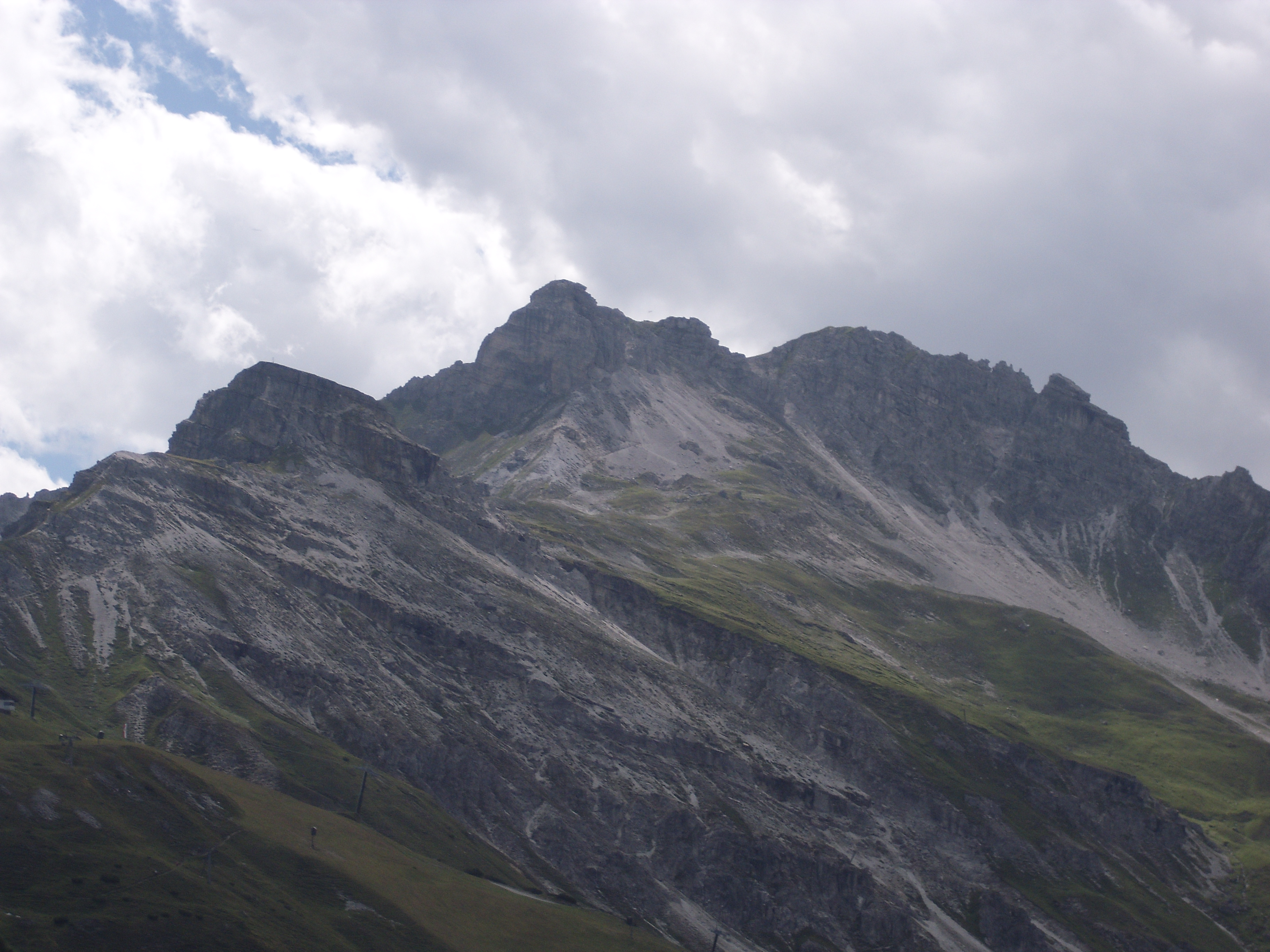
- The Hoher Burgstall seen from the Kreuzjoch saddle

Highest point
- Elevation: 2,611 m (AA) (8,566 ft)
- Prominence: 155 m ↓ Schlicker Scharte
- Isolation: 1.4 km → Schlicker Seespitze
- Coordinates: 47°07′59″N 11°16′47″E

Geography
- Location within Austria
- Location: Southwest of Innsbruck, Tyrol, Austria
- Parent range: Kalkkögel, Stubai Alps

Geology
- Mountain type: Rocky summit
- Rock type: Limestone

Climbing
- Normal route: From the south via the Starkenburg Hut

The Hoher Burgstall is a mountain, 2,611 m, in the Kalkkögel mountain chain in the Stubai Alps, southeast of the Schlicker Seespitze (2,804 m) mountain, the tallest in the Kalkkögel. Its summit offers a good view into the Oberbergtal, the upper Stubaital, the Serles ridge and the majority of the Kalkkögel.

== Ascents ==
The summit is accessible from Starkenburger Hut to the south.

From the north, a rocky gully leads to the top: from the Schlick a well signed path climbs to the Sennjoch saddle. The route continues uphill to the Burgstalljoch and on the path to the Schlicker Scharte wind gap, left through the rock gully to the summit. Alternatively the rock gully can be accessed from the Schlicker Scharte.

The Central Alpine Way 02A runs across the western flank of the Hoher Burgstall.

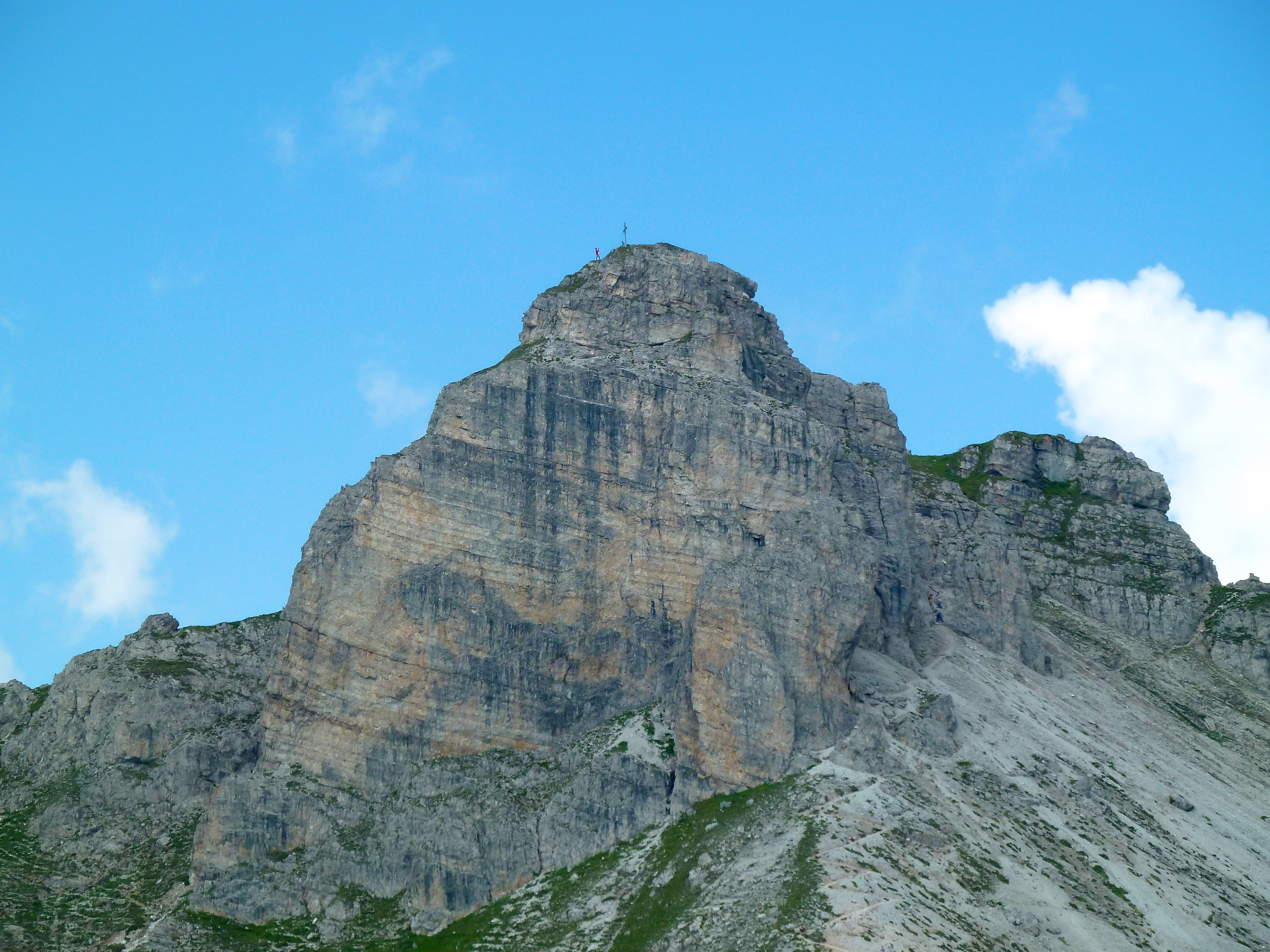
View from the Niederer Burgstall

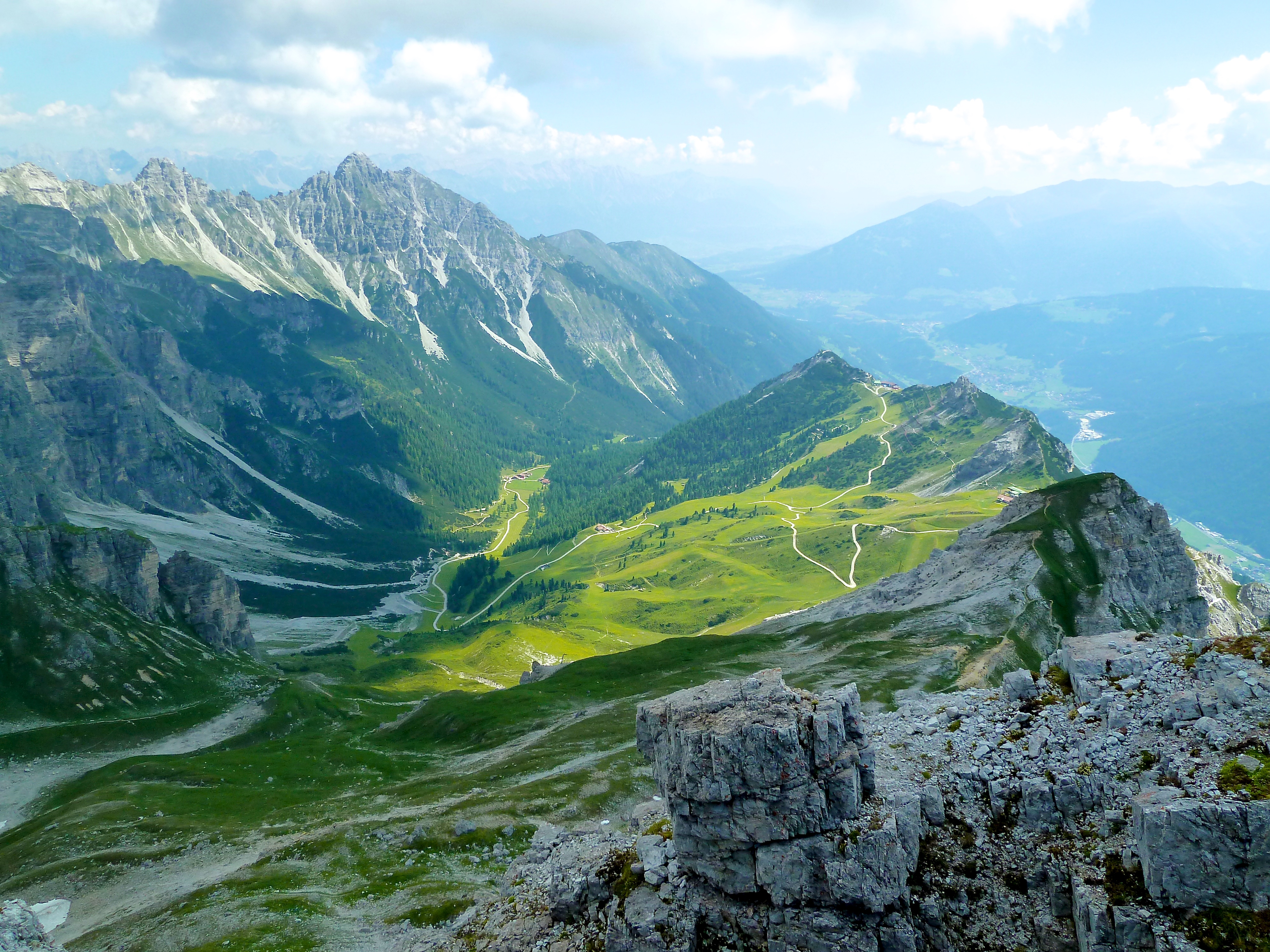
View from the Hoher Burgstall

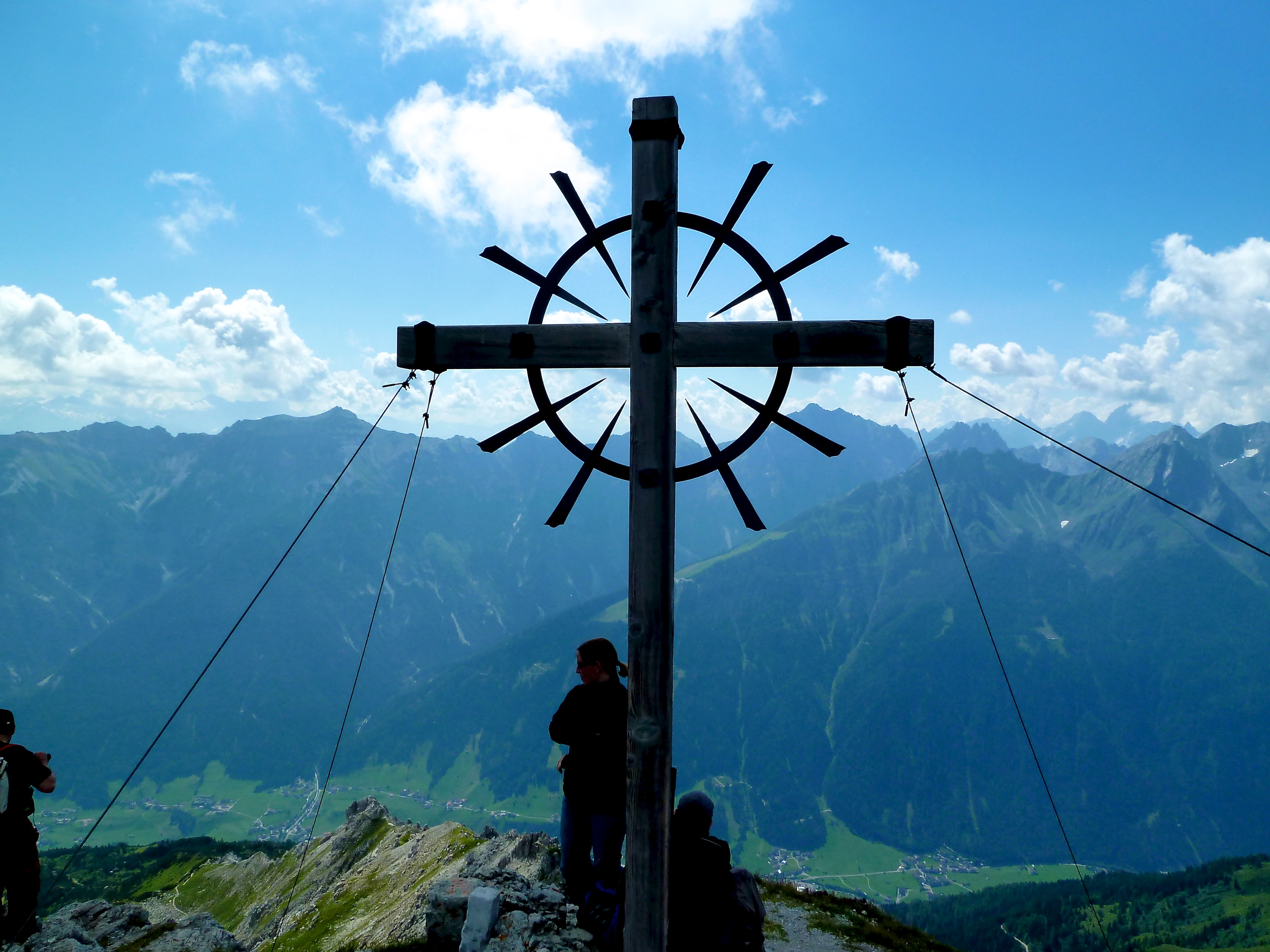
View towards the Elfer
