= Monte Kaolino =

Man-made sand dune in Germany

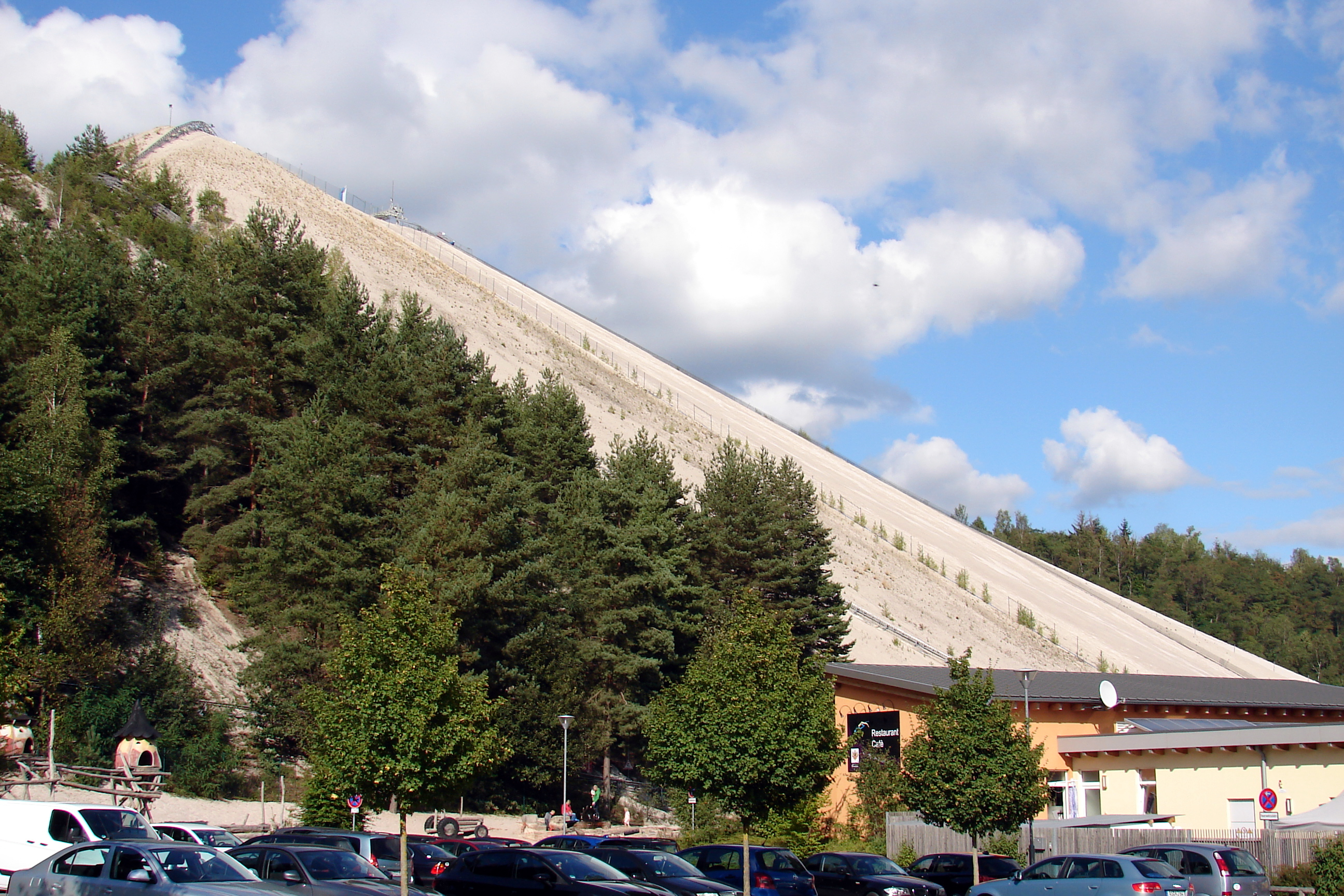
- Interactive map of Monte Kaolino
- Location: Hirschau, Germany
- Coordinates: 49°32′3.95″N 11°58′0.70″E
- Vertical: 120 metres (394 ft)
- Trails: 3
- Lift system: 1 funicular
- Terrain parks: Yes
- Night skiing: No
- Website: Monte Kaolino

Monte Kaolino is a sand dune in Hirschau, Bavaria, Germany. It consists of 35,000,000 tonnes (34,000,000 long tons; 39,000,000 short tons) of sand, a by-product of the nearby kaolinite production. The sand dune is now used as a ski resort for sand skiing and sandboarding, in addition to other activities.

== History ==
By the 1950s the pile of sand had grown large enough that people experimented with skiing on it, and in 1956 a ski club was formed. Uniquely to this hill, skiing is done directly on the sand and as a result, its operating season is inverse with ski areas elsewhere - it only opens in summer, even though the area does snow in winter.

The hill is the only sandsports facility equipped with a ski lift, and used to host the Sandboarding World Championship until 2007. A smaller scale competition, SandSpirit, is still held every year in July.

The area was extensively renovated in 2007. In addition to the ski hill, there are also camping facilities, a pool, a geopark, and trails.

== Campsite ==
The campsite, which was created in the 1950s, was significantly enlarged in 2007. There are 350 pitches on the campsite and six mobile homes. The mobile homes are for four persons and they are equipped with showers, toilet and a kitchen. Long-term camping is also possible.

In the past the campsite won several prices:

- 2022: 2nd place Campsite Award, category "H – Freizeitangebote für Jugendliche (15-24 Jahre)"
- 2020: 1st place Campsite Award, category "H – Freizeitangebote für Jugendliche u. junge Erwachsene", 3rd place Campsite Award, category "I – Freizeitangebote für Erwachsene"
- 2019: 2nd place Campsite Award, category "H – Freizeitangebot-Jugendliche (15-24 Jahre)", 1st place Campsite Award, category "I – Freizeitangebot-Erwachsene (25-50 Jahre)"

== Amusement park ==
On the south side of the dune an amusement park called "Freizeitpark Monte Kaolino" with several attractions was created.

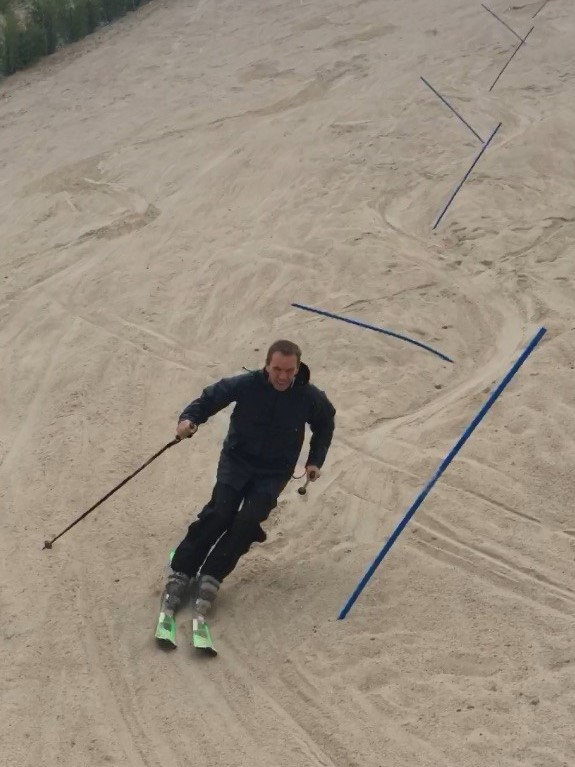
Sandkier on Monte Kaolino

=== Piste ===
On the 200 m-long (660 ft) run skiers, bigfoot riders, sandboarders and zipflbob (mini bob) riders have the opportunity to perform winter sports during summer.

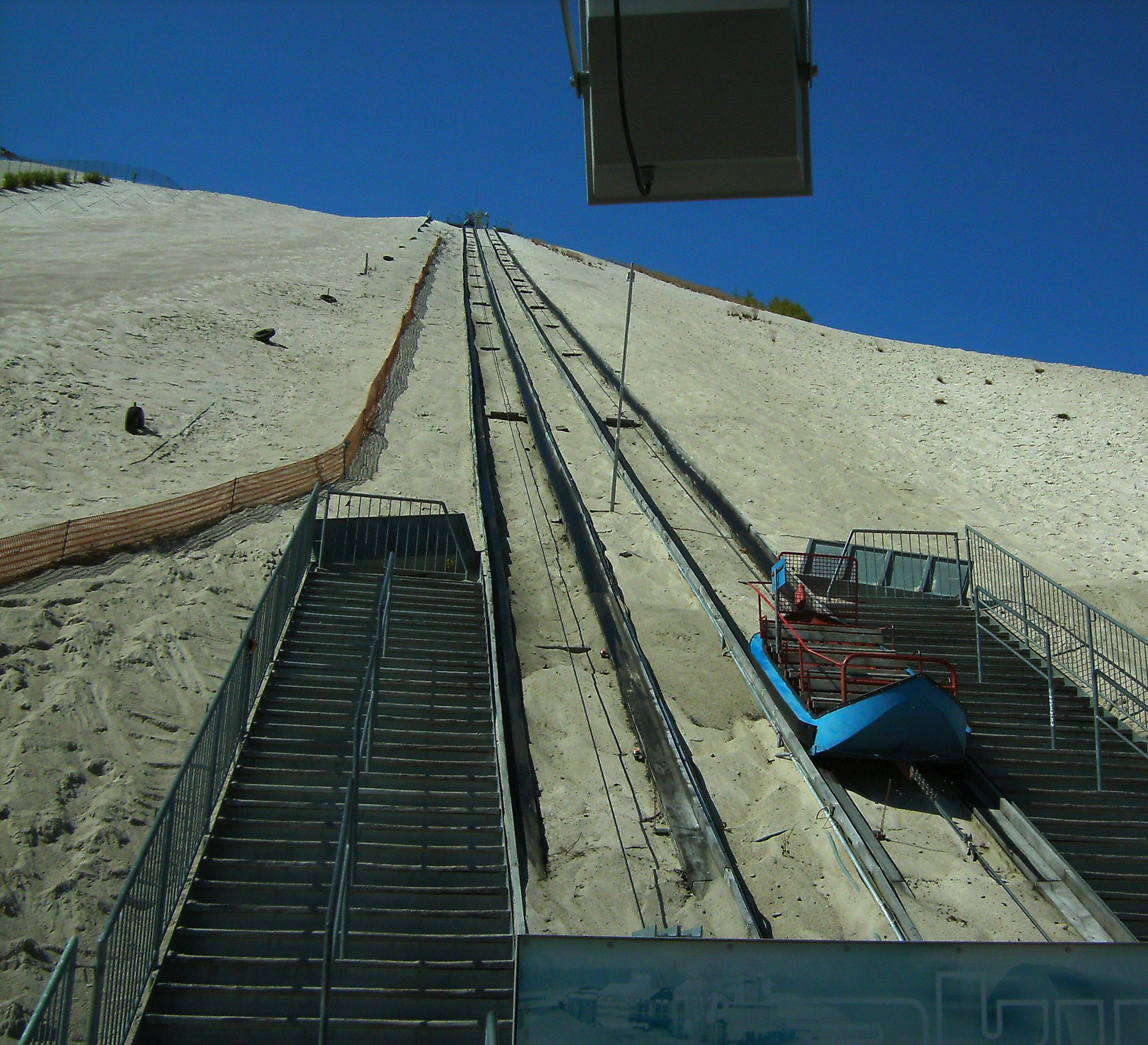
Funicular elevator at Monte Kaolino

=== Funicular elevator ===
There is a funicular elevator, which brings the passengers to the top of the dune, but it can also be used the way down. In 2009 the funicular elevator was renewed. It consists of two ships, each of the ships is able to carry 9 persons. The funicular elevator can be used by skiers or by hikers.

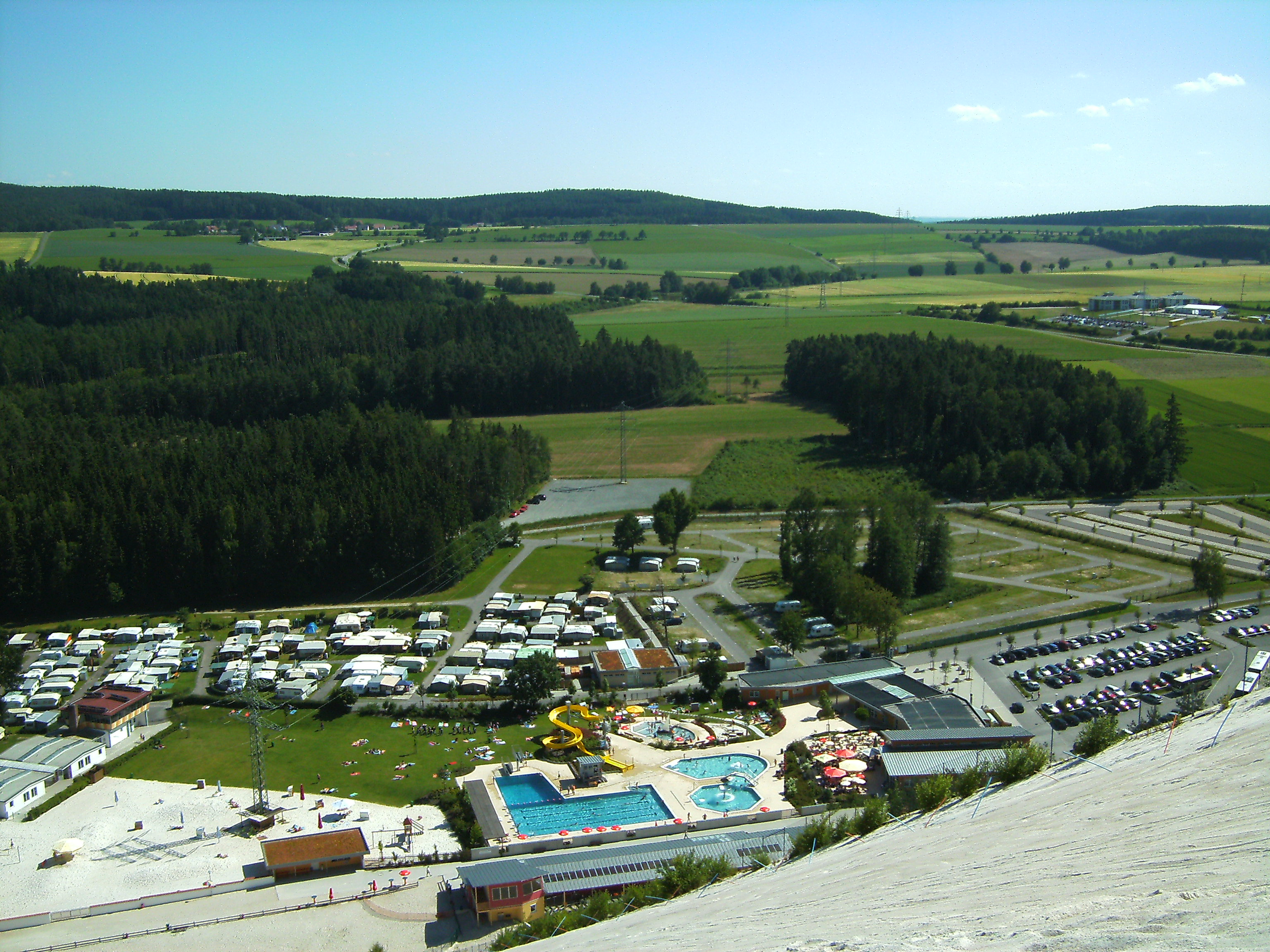
View of the dune pool from Monte Kaolino

=== Dune pool ===
The first pool was erected in 1959. It was torn down in 2007 and replaced by a new one. It has a 25 m (82 ft) swimming pool, a 50 m-long (160 ft) water slide, a covered children's pool of 70m2, an adventure pool and a springer basin. The pool is heated by solar thermal collectors and a biogas plant.

=== Forest high ropes course ===
In the forest high ropes course there are five trails with different difficulty levels. The maximum heights of the trails vary from four to twelve metres.

=== Summer toboggan ===
In September 2008 the so called "monte-coaster", a summer toboggan, was opened. Its descent is about 800 metres long and it overcomes a height difference of 120 m (390 ft) at an inclination of a maximum of 24 degrees (between 8 and 9 degrees). There are 42 sleds, each of them can carry two persons. For security reasons, every sled has got a belt for every passenger and a centrifugal brake which is activated at a speed of 40 km/h. Besides this centrifugal brake the speed can be reduced individually by a manual brake. The operator of the system is SC Monte Kaolino Hirschau.

=== Adventure golf ===
In 2014 a miniature golf course called "Adventure-Golf" with 18 holes was built. The players play on artificial turf.

=== Inline skating track ===
In 2008 a 3.5 km-long (2.2 mi) inline skating track was built. It is not only used for inline skating but also for roller skiing. The inline skating track connects the Freizeitpark Monte Kaolino with Sportpark Hirschau.

=== Water adventure playground ===
In front of the restaurant there is a water Adventure playground with watercourse and waterwheel.

== Geotope status ==
The Bayerische Landesamt für Umwelt lists the „Monte Kaolino“ bei Hirschau as a geotope.

== See also ==
- List of funicular railways
