= Marchreisenspitze =

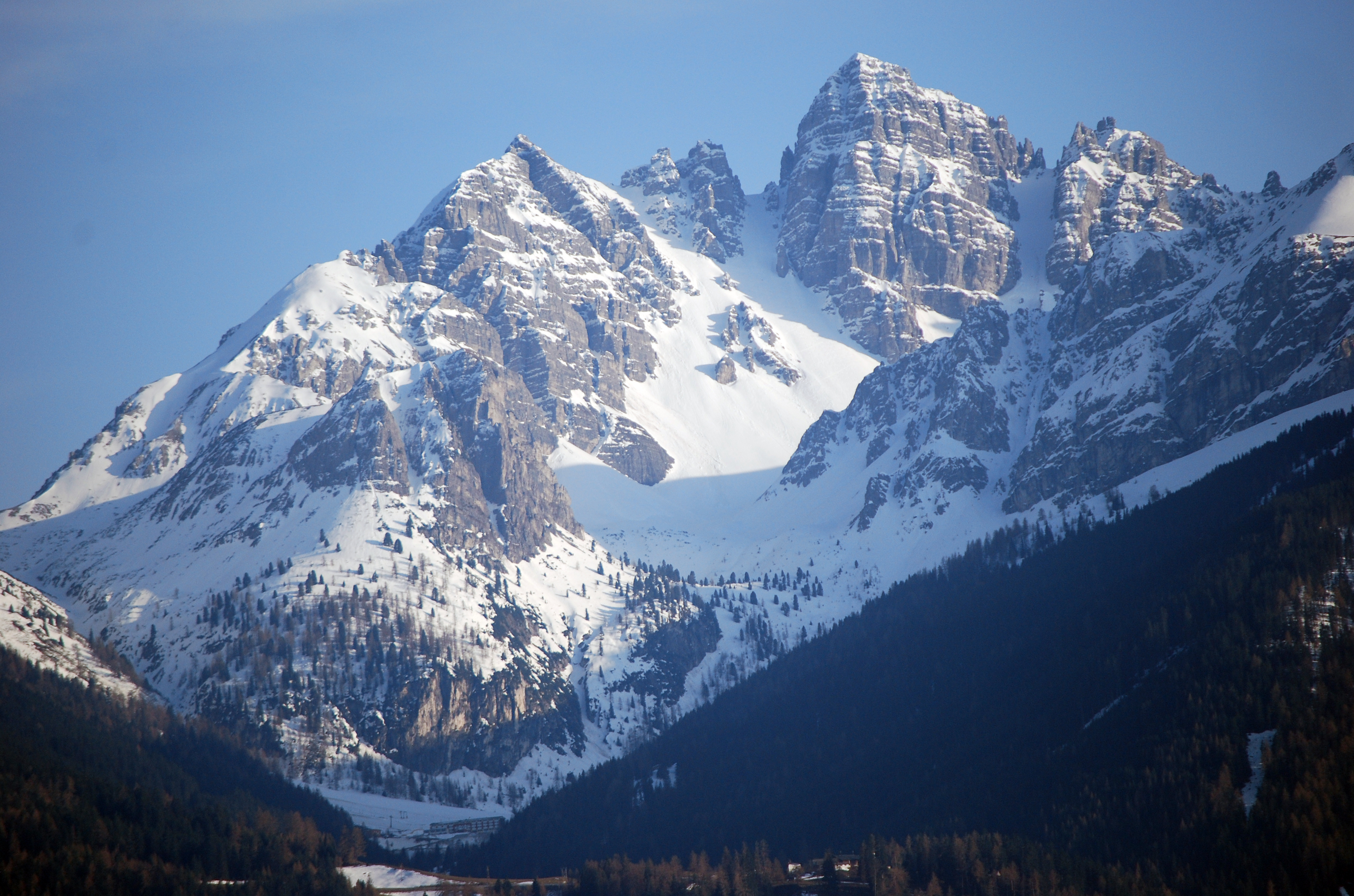
- Centre right: the Marchreisenspitze; left: the Ampferstein; between: the Kehlbachlspitzen. Taken from the north.

Highest point
- Elevation: 2,620 m (AA) (8,600 ft)
- Prominence: 2,620-2,401 m ↓ Malgrubenscharte
- Isolation: 2.2 km → Steingrubenkogel
- Coordinates: 47°10′21″N 11°18′30″E

Geography
- Location within Austria
- Location: Tyrol, Austria
- Parent range: Kalkkögel, Stubai Alps

Geology
- Rock age: Norian
- Rock type: main dolomite

Climbing
- First ascent: 26 June 1879 by Carl Gsaller (tourist)
- Normal route: Lustige Bergler Steig

The Marchreisenspitze, at 2,620 m, is the fifth highest summit of the Kalkkögel in the Stubai Alps. Together with the Ampferstein and the Malgrubenspitze, they form the well known Dreigestirn ("Three Stars") above the Axamer Lizum, which are visible far into the Inn valley.

== Ascent ==
The most popular route to the top is the "Lustige Bergler Steig", an easy klettersteig, that runs from Halsl over the Ampferstein and up to the Marchreisenspitze. From Ampferstein, the route climbs past the southern side of the Kehlbachlspitzen before leading to the south flank of the Marchreisenspitze. It crosses a boulder-strewn ravine and several ledges before reaching the summit.

Another ascent is the one from the Gsallerweg through the southwest flank.

There are also several routes through the large gravel field of the Lizum or from the Schlick valley head to the south.

== Gallery ==
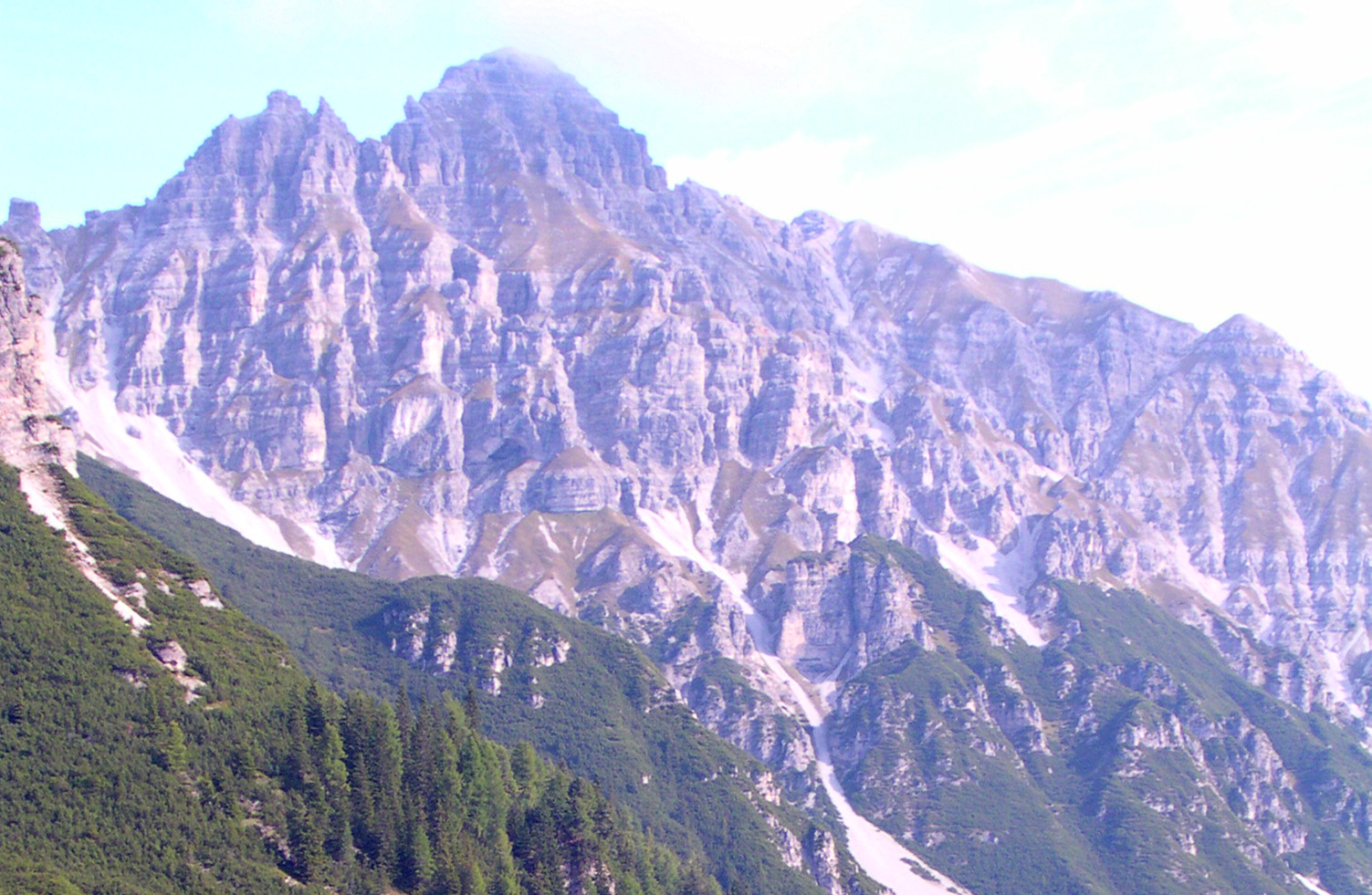
From the southwest

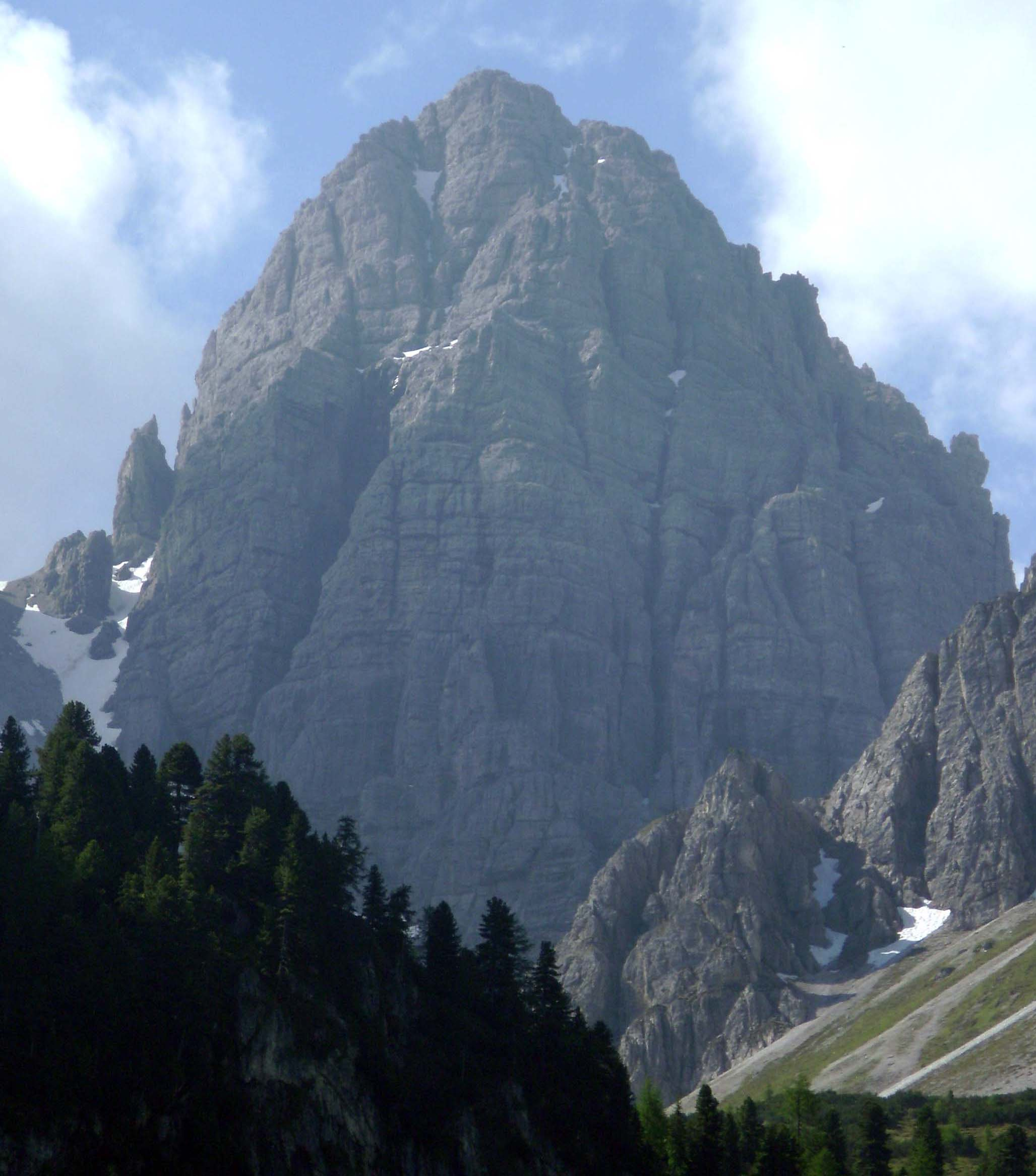
From the Axamer Lizum to the north

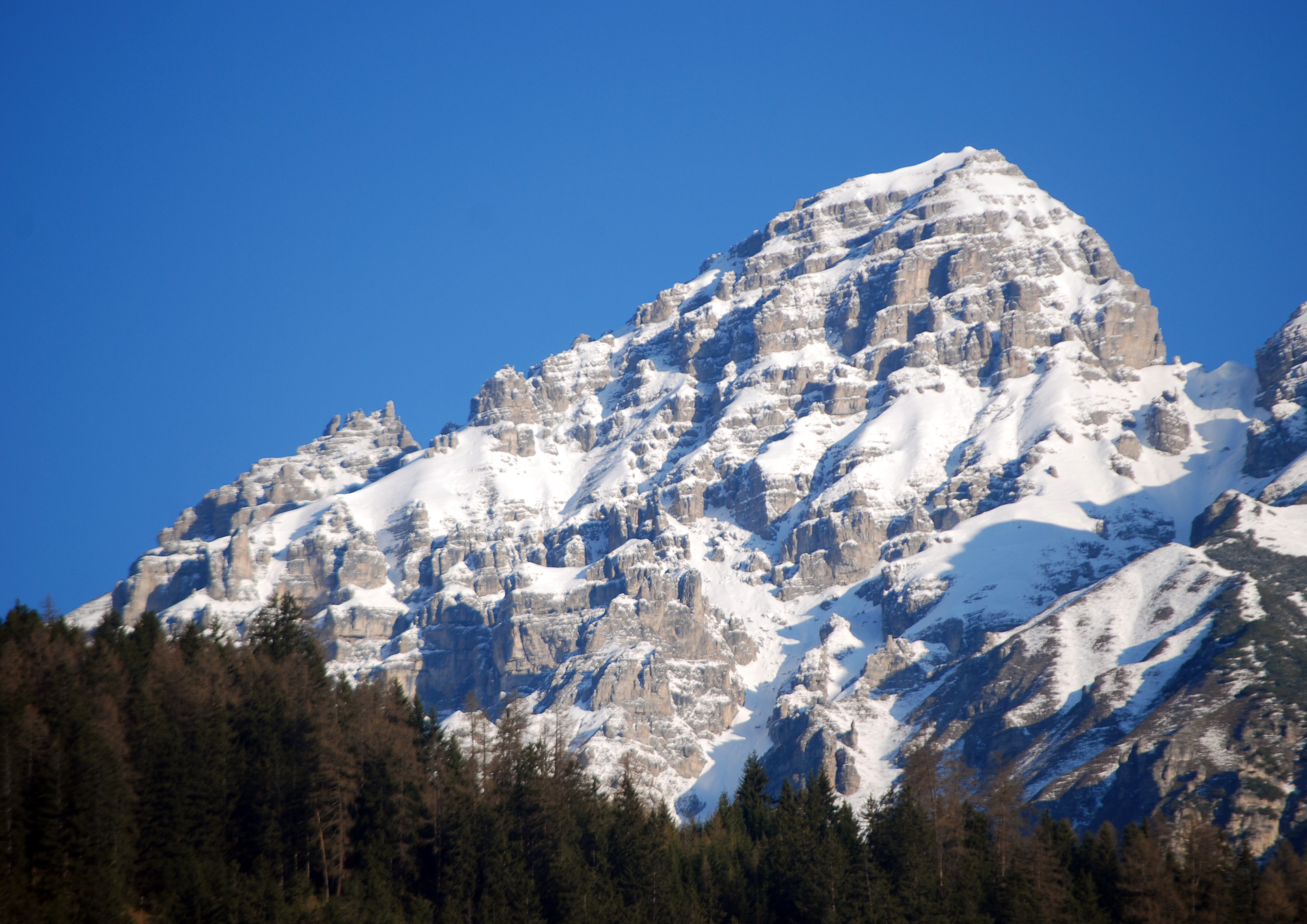
From the southeast

== Literature ==
Walter Klier (2006), Alpenvereinsführer Stubaier Alpen alpin (in German) (13th ed.), Munich: Bergverlag Rudolf Rother, p. 446, ISBN 3-7633-1271-4
