= Massenricht =

Village in Bavaria, Germany

- Ortsteil of Stadt Hirschau
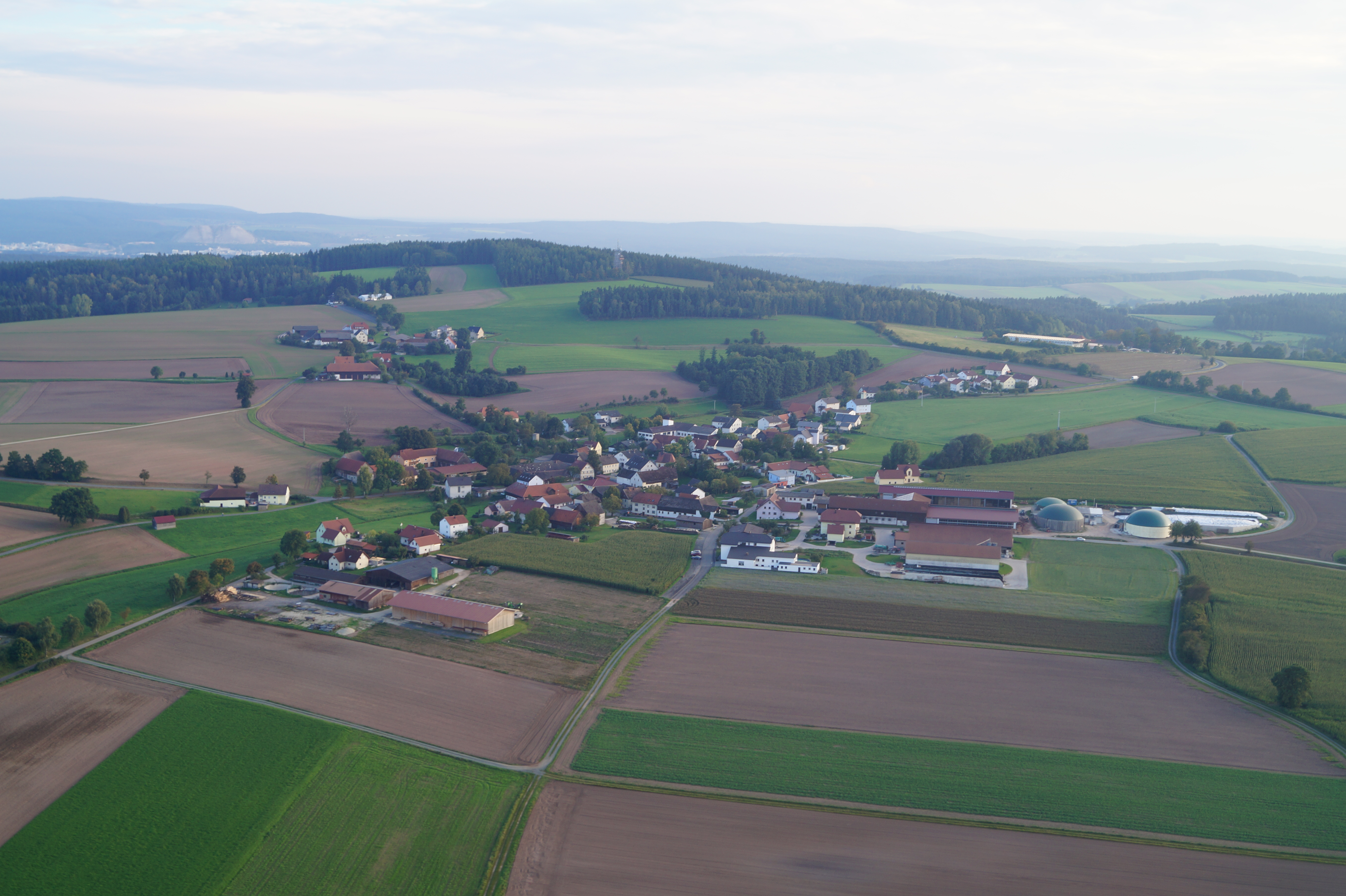
- Aerial view of Massenricht and the observation tower

- Location of the village Massenricht in the northern part of the municipal area of Stadt Hirschau
- Interactive map of Massenricht
- Location within Germany Location within Bavaria
- Coordinates: 49°35′49″N 11°57′11″E
- Country: Germany
- State: Bavaria
- Admin. region: Upper Palatinate
- District: Amberg-sulzbach
- Municipality: Stadt Hirschau
- Elevation: 487 m (1,598 ft)
- Time zone: UTC+01:00 (CET)
  - Summer (DST): UTC+02:00 (CEST)
- Postal codes: 92242

Massenricht is a former municipality in the today's municipality of Hirschau in the district of Amberg-Sulzbach in Bavaria, Germany. On 1 May 1978 Massenricht was incorporated to Hirschau.
