= Sand skiing =

Skiing on the sand dunes

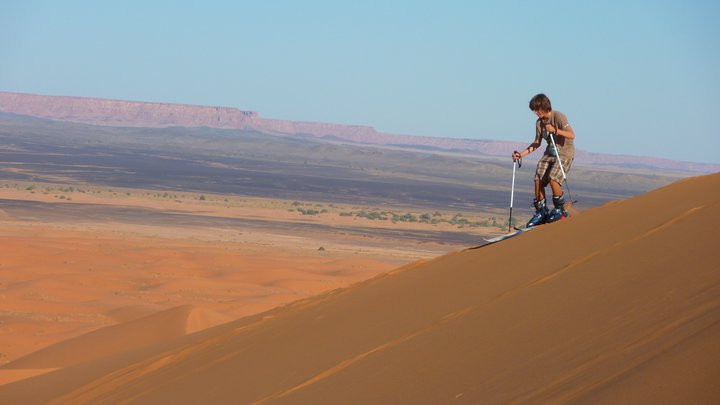
Skiing in the Sahara

Sand skiing (occasionally sand-skiing) is a sport and form of skiing in which the skier rides down a sand dune or strides across a beach on skis. It is practised in many sandy areas, including Sossusvlei, Namibia and Peru, along with other boardsports such as sandboarding. Sand skiing equipment includes a pair of skis with a laminate base and wax that needs to be applied to reduce friction from the sand. An International Sandboarding and Sandski Association (InterSands) was founded in 2014 at St. Gallen, Switzerland.

Mahé Freydier, a french ski instructor, set a Guinness World Record in speed sand-skiing on 27 September 2025 on Nazca dunes, in Peru. He reached a speed of 122 km/h.

Competitions over the years have included:

- International Sand Ski Tournament in Florida held from 1949 to 1951
- Sandblast held in Prince George, British Columbia annually from 1971 to 2003
- World Sand Skiing Championships held at Redondo Beach, CA
- Nevada Sand Mountain GS Championship
- international European championships in sand skiing held regularly on Monte Kaolino since 2007
- Freestyle SandSnow was first held in 2018

In 2018, Fayoum University held a sand skiing event in Fayoum with students from around Egypt joining in on the fun.

== History ==
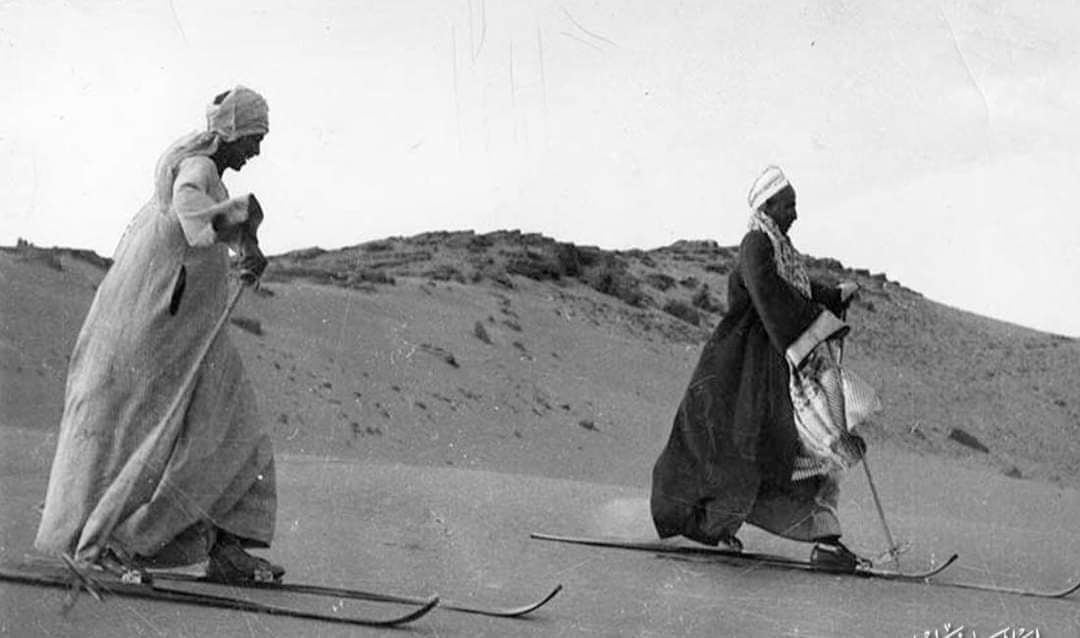
Egypt 1939

Skiing on sand has been reported before 1920 in Germany, in 1927 Sahara, on an Asian expedition and throughout the 1930s in

- Great Sand Dunes National Park, Colorado
- French Algeria
- Cronulla sand dunes, Australia
- Venice Beach, California
- Shirahama Beach, Japan
- Peru
- Cape Cod, Massachusetts
- Long Island, New York
- Tadoussac, Canada
- Death Valley, California
- Camber Sands, England

== See also ==
- Dry ski slope
- Roller skiing
- Grass skiing
- Lençóis Maranhenses National Park
