= Sandboarding =

Boardsport

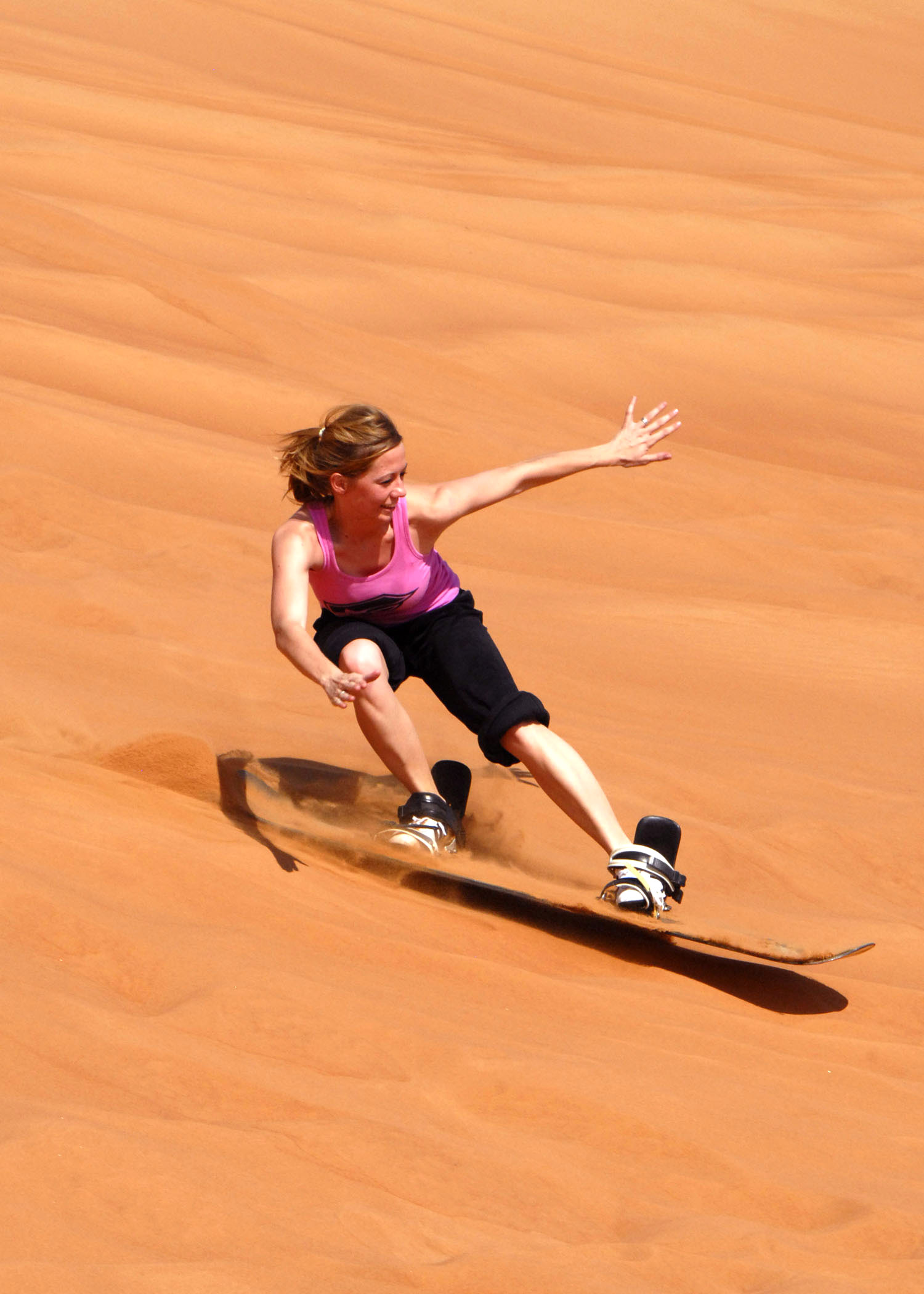
Sandboarding in Dubai, United Arab Emirates

Sandboarding is a boardsport and extreme sport similar to snowboarding that involves riding down a sand dune while standing on a board, with both feet strapped in. Sand sledding can also be practised sitting down or lying on the belly or the back. It typically involves a sand sled, although it is also somewhat possible to use snow sleds or snowboards. The invention of modern sandboarding is largely attributed to Lon Beale, aka 'Doctor Dune', who began sandboarding in 1972 in California's Mojave Desert.

Sandboarding has adherents throughout the world, but is most prevalent in desert areas or coastal areas with beach dunes. It is less popular than snowboarding, partly because it is very difficult to build a mechanised ski lift on a sand dune, meaning participants must climb or ride a dune buggy or all-terrain vehicle back to the top of the dune. On the other hand, dunes are normally available year-round as opposed to ski resorts, which are seasonal.

== Equipment ==
The sandboard base is much harder than a snowboard, and is built mostly out of formica or laminex with special base materials now being made, that will slide on wet and dry sand. To glide in the sand, the board bottom is often waxed, usually with a paraffin-based sandboard wax, before a run. Afterwards, the bottom of the board may have a lightly sanded look to it. Most terrain sandboards are composed of hardwood ply, while 'full-size' sandboards are a wood, fiber glass, and plastic composite. However, a snowboarding base will sometimes work on steeper dunes as well.

== Worldwide ==
Sandboarding is practised worldwide, with locations available on every continent except Antarctica. The World's Greatest Sandboarding Destinations lists sandboarding destinations in over 65 territories.

=== Sandboarding in Hawaii ===
Sand boarding or sand sliding (Hawaiian: heʻe one) was a favourite beach pastime on the islands throughout the first half of the 20th century including the outbreak of World War II.

=== Sandboarding in Israel ===
Drorbamidbar has sandboarding in Israel at Negev Desert not far from Ashalim in Ramat HaNegev.

=== Sandboarding in Australia ===
Little Sahara on Kangaroo Island in South Australia is a sand dune system roughly covering two square kilometres (0.77 sq mi). The highest dune is approximately 70 metres (230 ft) above sea level.

Lucky Bay, about 30 kilometres (19 mi) south of Kalbarri, in Western Australia, is another sandboarding hotspot. Sandboarding Tours are offered in the area.

The Stockton dunes, 2.3 hours north from Sydney. Stockton Bight Sand Dunes system is up to one kilometre (0.62 mi), 32 kilometres (20 mi) long, and covers an area of over 4,200 hectares (10,000 acres; 42,000,000 m^{2}). The massive sand dunes climb up to 40 metres (130 ft) high. Located only minutes from the centre of Nelson Bay, it is the largest sand dune system in Australia.

=== Sandboarding in Africa ===
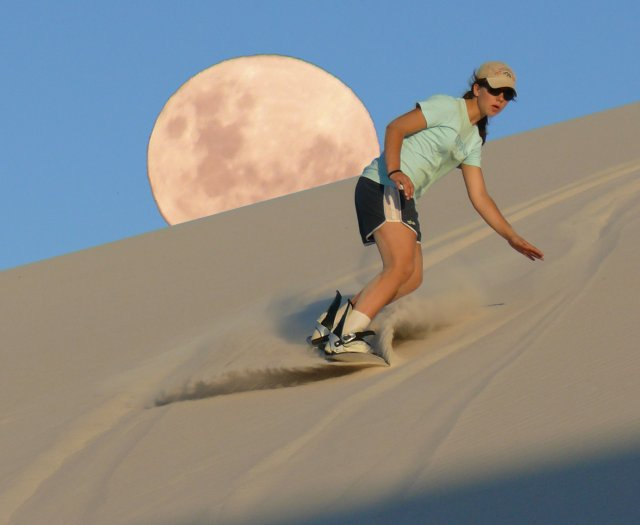
Woman sandboarding in Africa

Sandboarding sites in Egypt include the Great Sand Sea near Siwa Oasis واحة سيوة in Egypt's Western Desert, the Qattaniya القطانية sand dunes (1.5 h drive on/off-road from Cairo), El Safra الصفراء and Hadudah هدودة dunes midway between Dahab and St. Catherine in Sinai.

Namibia features sand-skiing, which is similar to sandboarding, performed with skis instead of a board. Most of the sand-skiing is performed in the Namib desert dunes around Swakopmund and Walvis Bay. With a special permit it is sometimes possible to sand-ski at the world's highest dunes in Sossusvlei. Henrik May, a German living in Namibia for some 10 years, set a Guinness World Record in speed sand-skiing on 6 June 2010. He reached a speed of 92.12 km/h (57.24 mph).

After some pioneers like Derek Bredenkamp who boarded Swakopmund around 1974, commercial operators in South Africa began offering sandboarding to tourists in 1994. In 2000 the Sandboarding South Africa league was established. Between 2002 and 2004 the South African Sandboarding League held competitions on the Matterhorn Dune located between Swakopmund and Walvis bay. Competition events included dual slalom, boarder cross and big air events. In 2005 and 2006 Alter Action held sandboarding competitions at Matterhorn but the competitions no longer formed part of the South African Sandboarding League during those years. The league collapsed, then the sport was revived again in 2007 with weekly sandboarding sessions in and around Cape Town and Gauteng.

=== Sandboarding in the United States ===
Sand Master Park, located in Florence, Oregon is a dedicated sandboarding park and the first of its kind, featuring 200 acres (81 ha; 810,000 m^{2}) of sculpted sand dunes and a full-time pro shop. Dune Riders International is the governing body for competitive sandboarding worldwide and sanctions events each season at Sand Master Park and around the world. Sand Master Park is also the factory outlet for the largest sandboard company in the world, Venomous Sandboards.

Coral Pink Sand Dunes State Park, near Kanab, Utah, permits sandboarding on roughly 2,000 acres of sand dunes within its boundaries. Utah also contains sand dunes near Salt Lake City, Lake Powell, and Moab. Additionally, the company Slip Face Sandboards is based in Provo, Utah.

Great Sand Dunes National Park and Preserve near Alamosa, Colorado has sandboarding on what it calls the tallest dunes in North America. Sandboarding and skiing are permitted anywhere on the dunefield away from vegetated areas.

=== Sandboarding in South America ===
Peru is known for having large sand dunes in Ica, some reaching up to 2 km (1.2 miles). Duna Grande in Ica is the largest sand dune in the world. The Copa Sandboarding Perú (Peru – Sandboarding Cup) has been held near Paracas every year since 2009. Since 2017 the Sandboard World Cup is hosted in the region of Ica by InterSands. There are also great dunes near the capital city (Lima) in Chilca.

In Chile, sandboarding is practiced throughout the north of the country, including the Medanoso dunes in Copiapo (where the Dakar rally takes place), Puerto Viejo beach in Caldera, excellent dunes in Iquique, and some near Viña del Mar.

=== Sandboarding in Central America ===
Nicaragua is home to Cerro Negro, the youngest volcano in Central America. Since it has steep slopes and volcanic sand, it is possible to sandboard down this active volcano.

=== Sandboarding in Europe ===
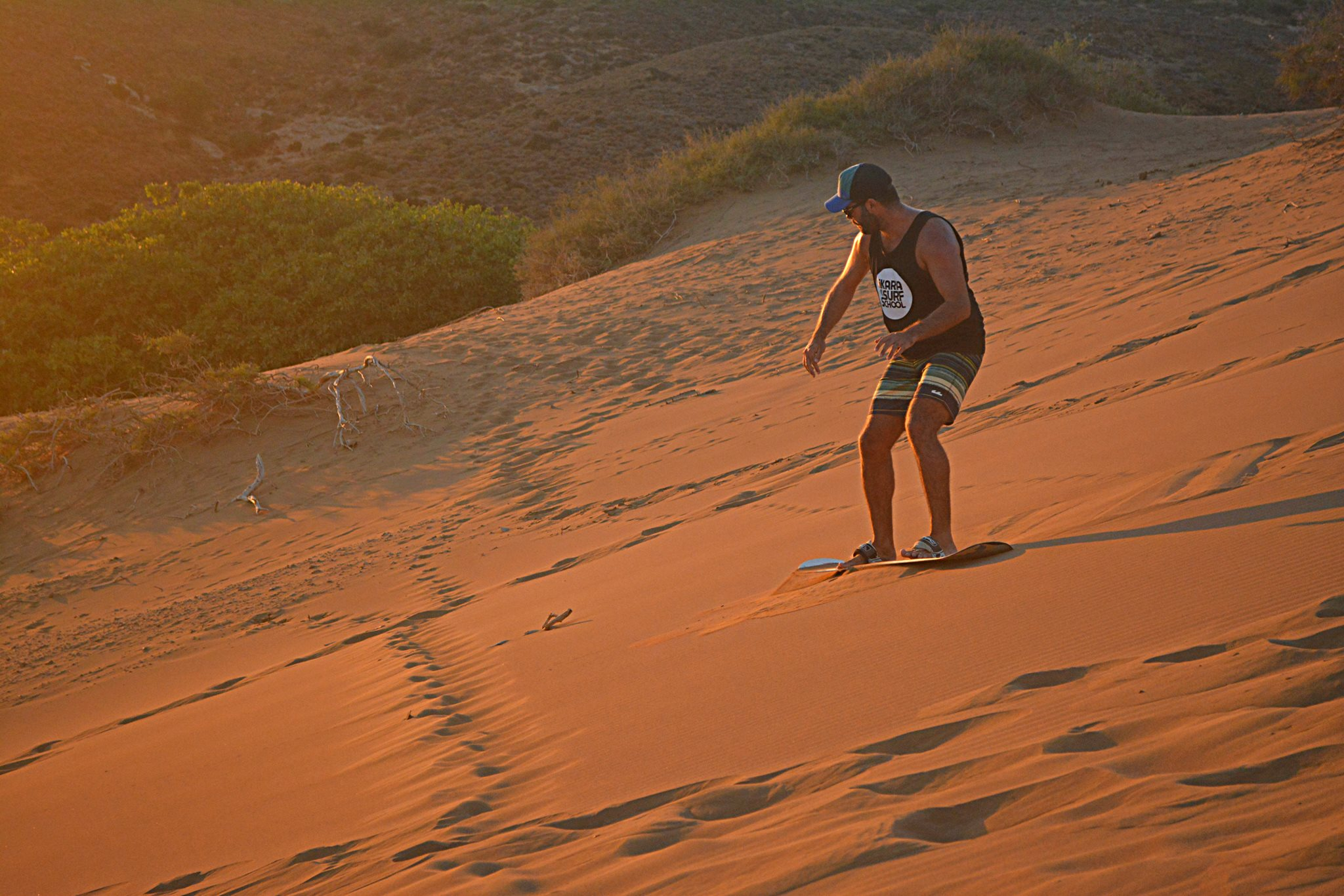
Sandboarding in Greece

A rather small sand mountain is the Monte Kaolino in Hirschau, Germany. Equipped with a 120-metre (390 ft) lift, it was the host of the annual Sandboarding World Championships until 2007.

The Dune of Pilat in France is an hours' drive from Bordeaux; it is the tallest dune in Europe, measuring 3 kilometres across, 500 metres wide and between 100 and 115 metres tall depending on the year.

Amothines is a small desert five kilometres (3 mi) from Katalakkos village in Limnos, Greece. There are many sand dunes there, where people can practice sandboarding.

=== Sandboarding in the United Kingdom ===
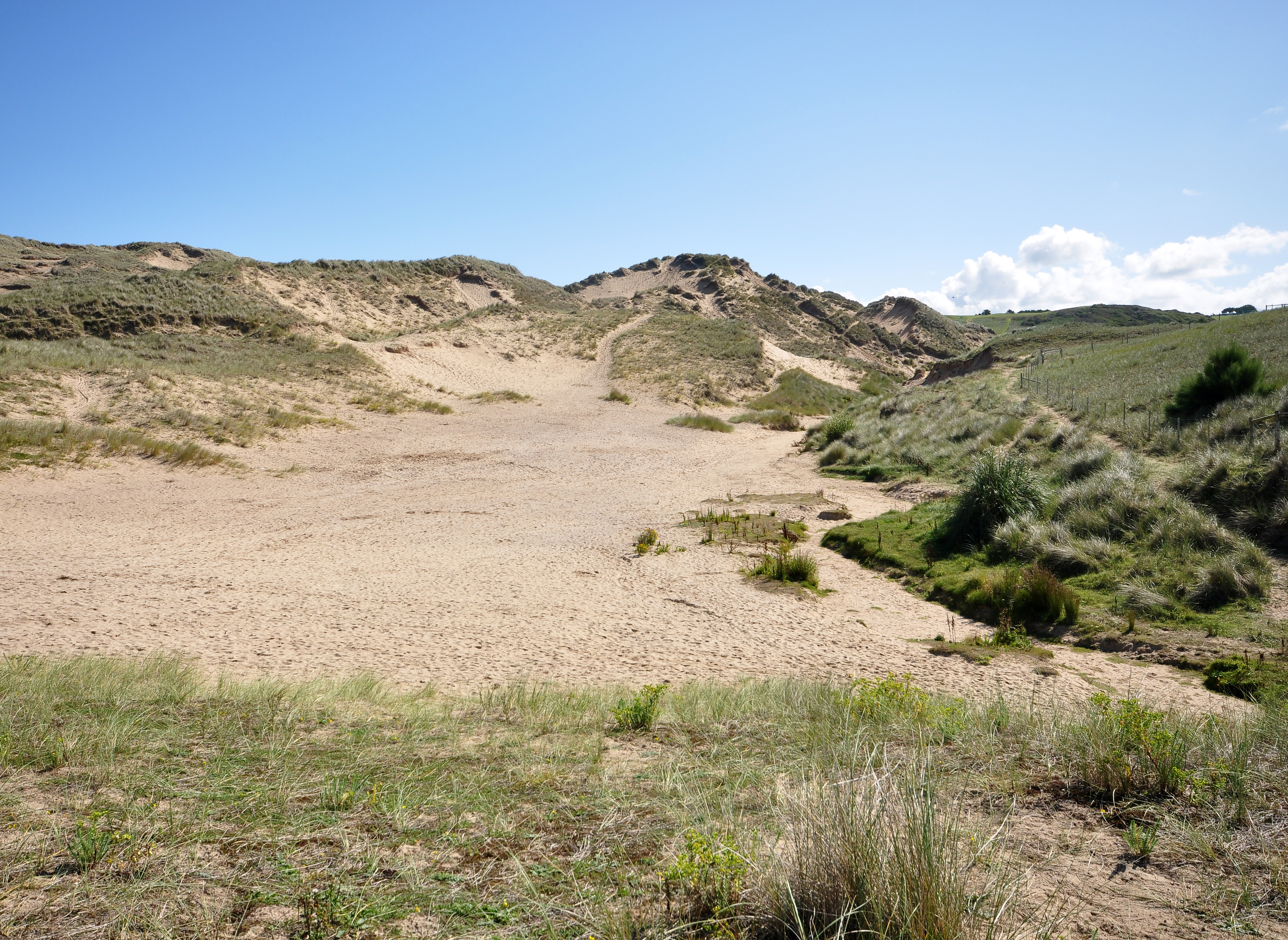
Sand dunes in Holywell, England

Wales is home to the village of Merthyr Mawr that is 2 1/2 miles (4 km) from the town of Bridgend, the village is close to a beach and it is home to the "Big Dipper", the second largest sand dune in Europe.

Holywell, Cornwall is also home to a beach with a complex of sand dunes; in the summer and during peak times, local shops that cater for beach goers also sell sandboards.

The Braunton Burrows sand dunes on the Devon coast, was the filming location for where Alex Bird became the first sandboarder to be towed by a car on British shores.

In the North East region of the United Kingdom, there is a small beach at Seaton Sluice where people can sandboard. This is a good alternative to sledding, as there is insufficient snow to support sledding there, even though the UK has a rather cold climate, with chilly winters and cool summers.

=== Sandboarding in the Russian Federation ===
Sandboarding in Russia began to develop and popularize in the village of Shoyna in the Nenets Autonomous Okrug. Local entrepreneur and public figure Fedor Shirokiy is a pioneer in this development. The Shoyna sand dunes are located above the Arctic Circle, offering a unique opportunity to master this sport in the extreme Arctic conditions.

== Events ==
- Sandboarding World Championship – The SWC was held annually in Hirschau (until 2007), Germany at Monte Kaolino, currently also the site of Europe's largest sand hill. Riders can board down dunes over 90 m (300 feet) tall, riding into a water landing site at the base of the hill. It has a sand lift, the only one in the world. Events include slalom (akin to snowboarding's parallel giant slalom), freestyle (similar to freestyle snowboarding) and sandboard cross (cf. snowboard cross).
- The current Sandboard World Cup is hosted in Ica - Peru every two years.
- Sand Master Jam – Annual sandboarding event that takes place in Florence, Oregon at Sand Master Park. This event occurs in late spring or early summer. The Sand Master Jam has been held since 1996.
- Pan-American Sandboarding Challenge – This event takes place in July in Aquiraz, Ceara, Brazil at Prainha's Beach. It features amateurs and professionals who wish to compete in freestyle and jump events.
- Sand Sports Super Show – Annual outdoor event for all sand sports, including sandboarding. This three-day event takes place in September in Costa Mesa, California at the Orange County Fair and Expo Center.
- Sand Spirit - Annual event that takes place at Monte Kaolino, Germany.
