= Weiher (Hirschau) =

Former municipality in Bavaria, Germany

- Ortsteil of Stadt Hirschau
- Interactive map of Weiher
- Location within Germany Location within Bavaria
- Coordinates: 49°30′48″N 11°58′8″E
- Country: Germany
- State: Bavaria
- Admin. region: Upper Palatinate
- District: Amberg-sulzbach
- Municipality: Stadt Hirschau
- Elevation: 514 m (1,686 ft)
- Time zone: UTC+01:00 (CET)
  - Summer (DST): UTC+02:00 (CEST)
- Postal codes: 92242

Weiher is a former municipality in the today's municipality of Hirschau in the district of Amberg-Sulzbach in Bavaria, Germany. On 1 April 1972, Weiher was incorporated to Hirschau.
