= Burgstaller =

Burgstaller is a surname. Notable people with the surname include:

- Alois Burgstaller (1871–1945), German-Austrian singer
- Gabi Burgstaller (born 1963), Austrian politician
- Peter Burgstaller (1964–2007), Austrian footballer
- Guido Burgstaller (born 1989), Austrian footballer
- Thomas Burgstaller (born 1980), Austrian footballer
