= Ferdinand Janner =

German theologian

Ferdinand Janner (4 February 1836 in Hirschau, Germany – 1 November 1895 in Regensburg, Germany) was a German theologian.

== Biography ==
Janner completed his schooling at the Latin school of Amberg. After his graduation there, he studied theology at Würzburg and Regensburg, He was ordained a priest on 13 August 1858.

For a time, Janner worked as a parish priest, but he eventually returned to the University of Würzburg, where he received his Doctor of Theology. Thereafter, he served first as the chaplain at Weiden, then in 1863, he became the prefect of the Regensburg seminary. In 1865, Janner became Professor of Religion and History at Speyer's gymnasium and, in 1867, Professor of Ecclesiastical History, Christian Archaeology, and History of Art at the Regensburg lyceum. Finally, in 1883, he became the diocesan consultor. Janner retired from active life in 1888 and died seven years later.

== Selected works ==
Janner wrote many works in both German and Latin, including:

- Geschichte der Bischöfe von Regensburg (in German). Vol. Erster Band. Regensburg. 1883. urn:nbn:de:bvb:355-ubr18603-6.
- Geschichte der Bischöfe von Regensburg (in German). Vol. Zweiter Band. Regensburg. 1884. urn:nbn:de:gbv:601-94206.
- Geschichte der Bischöfe von Regensburg (in German). Vol. Dritter Band. Regensburg. 1886. urn:nbn:de:bvb:355-ubr18605-6.
- Janner, Ferdinand (1861). De factis dogmaticis (in Latin). Würzburg.
- Infallibilem ecclesiam Catholicam esse in diiudicandis factis dogmaticis.
- Das officium unius martyris de communi in seinem Zusammenhang erklart.
- Das Heilige Land, und die heiligen Statten, ein Pilgerbuch.
- Missale parvun sive Missale Romanum in breviorem et commodiorem formam redactum.
- Die Bauhütten des deutschen Mittelaters.
- Nicolas von Weis, Bischof zu Speyer.
- Die Schotten in Regensburg, die Kirsche zu St. Jacob und deren Nordportal.
- Das romische Brevier in deutscher Sprache, in four volumes.
- Personen- und Sachregister zu Rass, Die Convertiten seit der Reformation, I-X.

== Sources ==
- Lauchert, Friedrich (1907). "Ferdinand Janner" . Catholic Encyclopedia. Vol. 1. pp. 283–284.
