= Château de Wangen =

Destroyed 13th-century castle in Bas-Rhin, France

Coordinates: 48°37′0″N 7°28′0″E

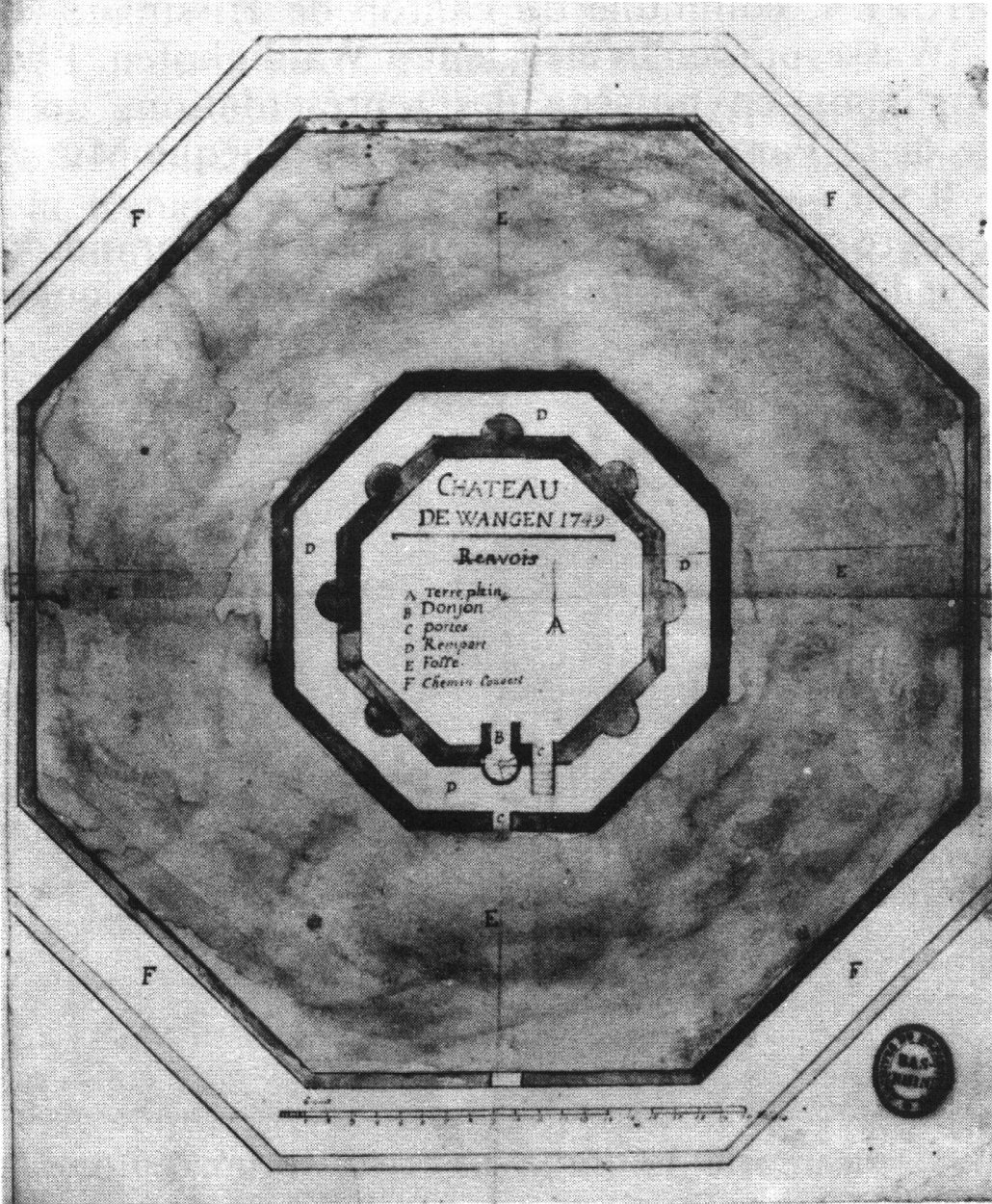
Château de Wangen, 1749 plan. Dictionnaire des Châteaux de l’Alsace Médiévale

The Château de Wangen is a destroyed 13th century castle in the commune of Wangen in the Bas-Rhin département of France. Located within the urban area of Wangen, all that remains is the central space it occupied, its plan is still visible on land maps.

The castle appears to date from the 13th century. It was mentioned as an episcopal fiefdom in 1359. In 1440, when Armagnac troops crossed the region in a campaign against Strasbourg, it suffered some damage. The inhabitants seized the castle in 1514, and the Saint-Étienne abbey of Strasbourg bought it for the Wangen family in 1566, though it is not known if any alterations were made at this time. In 1750, the remaining masonry was used for construction of the Freihof and was dispersed around the village.

Archive documents from 1749 indicate the presence of a castle built on an octagonal plan. Originally, it comprised a central keep, surrounded by an octagonal enceinte and a moat. Inside, the residences of the servants and cattle sheds were against the enclosing wall. In the 15th century, semicircular towers were added to each side of the octagon, one of them replacing the keep. The moat was widened to 23 metres and second octagonal fortified wall added, giving a total diameter of 101 metres.

The castle site has been listed since 1993 as a monument historique by the French Ministry of Culture.

== See also ==
- List of castles in France
