= Burgstall (Hirschau) =

Village in Bavaria, Germany

- Ortsteil of Stadt Hirschau
- Interactive map of Burgstall
- Location within Germany Location within Bavaria
- Coordinates: 49°31′55″N 11°53′17″E
- Country: Germany
- State: Bavaria
- Admin. region: Upper Palatinate
- District: Amberg-Sulzbach
- Municipality: Stadt Hirschau
- Elevation: 449 m (1,473 ft)
- Time zone: UTC+01:00 (CET)
  - Summer (DST): UTC+02:00 (CEST)
- Postal codes: 92242

Burgstall (German pronunciation: [ˈbʊʁkˌʃtal]) is a village in the municipality of Hirschau in the district of Amberg-Sulzbach in Bavaria, Germany.
