= Schlicker Seespitze =

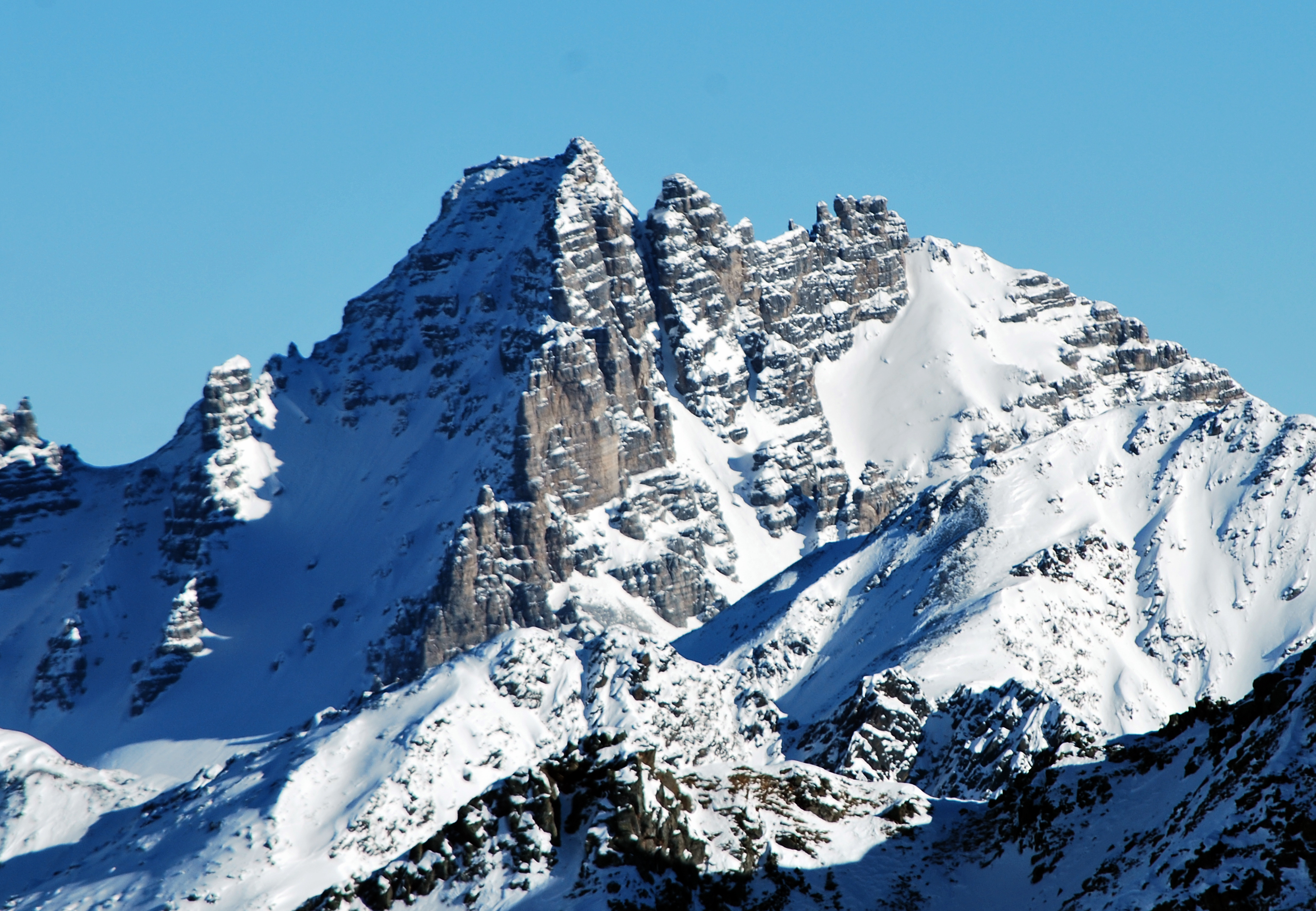
- The Schlicker Seespitze from the west

Highest point
- Elevation: 2,804 m (AA) (9,199 ft)
- Prominence: 2,804-2,477 m ↓ Sendersjöchl
- Isolation: 3.6 km → Schwarzhorn
- Coordinates: 47°08′44″N 11°16′24″E

Geography
- Location within Austria
- Location: Tyrol, Austria
- Parent range: Kalkkögel, Stubai Alps

Geology
- Rock age: Norian
- Rock type: main dolomite

Climbing
- First ascent: 13 July 1879 by Carl Gsaller
- Normal route: West flank (grade I)

The Schlicker Seespitze, at 2,804 m (AA), is the highest peak in the Kalkkögel range in Austria's Stubai Alps, and the southwestern cornerstone of the chain. This mountain, known for being extremely prone to landslides, is a good observation point. It is located near the village of Schlick.

From Schlick, the mountain appears like a deeply clefted rock massif with a huge southern arête crowned by the rock pinnacles of the Schlicker Manndln. From the other side, it resembles a crumbling, gashed peak rising above its scree slopes. The isolated Seejoch tower soars prominently over the Seejöchl saddle.

== Ascents ==
From Seejöchl (reached from the Adolf Pichler Hut or Schlick) a marked grade I climb runs through boulder terrain up to the Seespitzscharte col between the Seespitze and Riepenwand, along the north arête and over it briefly to the summit. Climbers should be conscious of the rockfalls since they are exposed to them for the entire route.

In addition, there are several Alpine climbing routes of up to grade VII+, of which some were opened by well-known Alpinists like Ludwig Purtscheller, Andreas Orgler, and Mathias Rebitsch. The crossing from the Schlicker Manndl is popular; this grade IV route runs from the Schlicker Schartl up to the top.

== Literature ==
- Klier, Walter (2006), Alpenvereinsführer Stubaier Alpen alpin (in German) (13th ed.), Munich: Bergverlag Rudolf Rother, p. 446, ISBN 3-7633-1271-4
