= Hirschau =

- Town
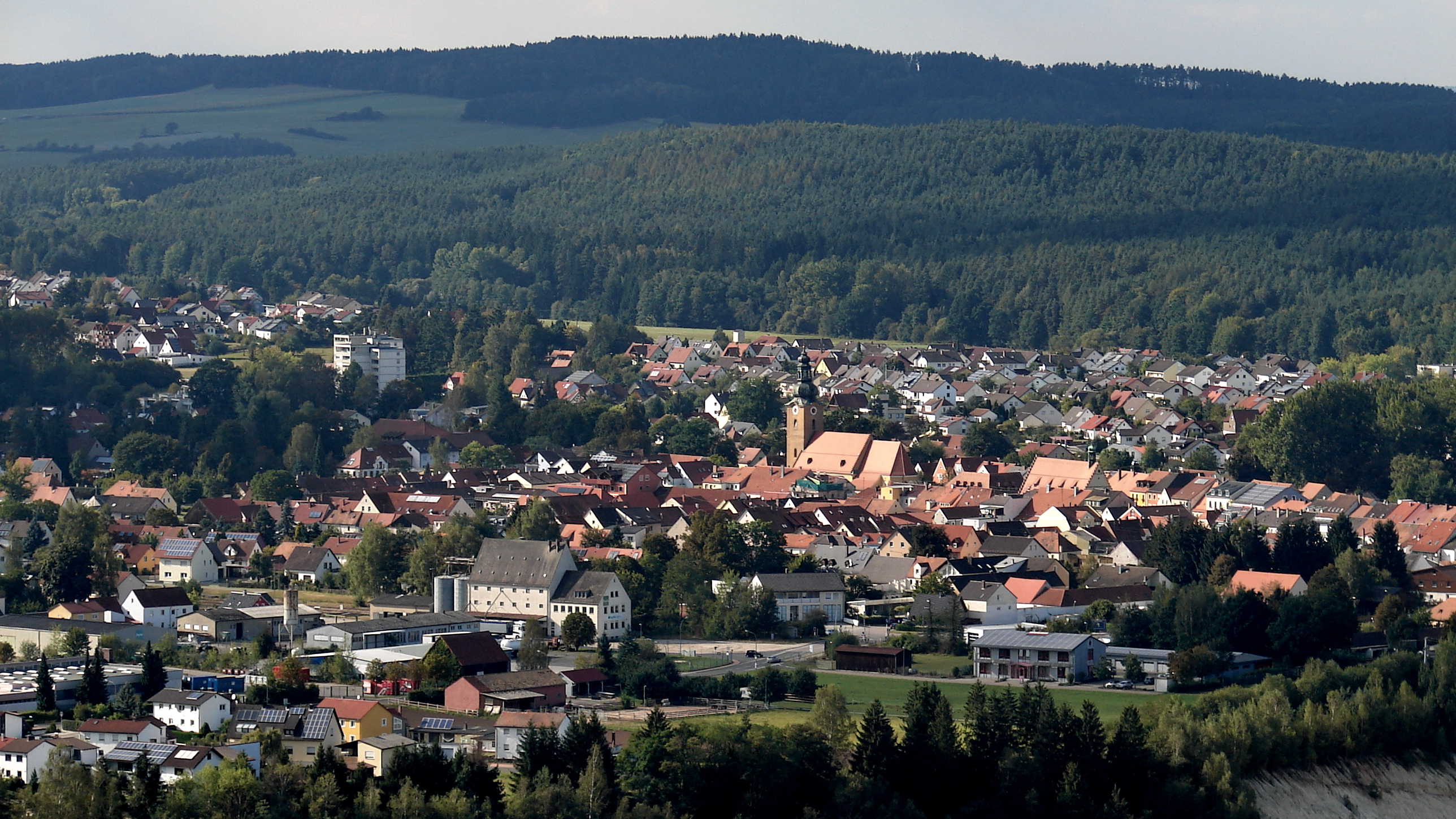
- Hirschau seen from Monte Kaolino

- Flag Coat of arms

- Location of Hirschau within Amberg-Sulzbach district
- Interactive map of Hirschau
- Location within Germany Location within Bavaria
- Coordinates: 49°32′N 11°57′E
- Country: Germany
- State: Bavaria
- Admin. region: Upper Palatinate
- District: Amberg-Sulzbach

Government
  - Mayor (2020–26): Hermann Falk (CSU)

Area
  - Total: 74.96 km^{2} (28.94 sq mi)
- Elevation: 411 m (1,348 ft)

Population (2025-12-31)
  - Total: 5,737
  - Density: 76.53/km^{2} (198.2/sq mi)
- Time zone: UTC+01:00 (CET)
  - Summer (DST): UTC+02:00 (CEST)
- Postal codes: 92242
- Dialling codes: 09622
- Vehicle registration: AS
- Website: hirschau.de

Hirschau (German pronunciation: [ˈhɪʁʃaʊ]) is a municipality in the Amberg-Sulzbach district, Upper Palatinate, Bavaria, Germany.

== Geography ==
Hirschau lies directly on the Bundesstraße 14 (Nuremberg - Rozvadov), 13 km northeast of Amberg and about 65 km east of Nuremberg. Apart from the small town Hirschau, the municipality consists of the following villages:

Districts of Stadt Hirschau

- Burgstall
- Dienhof
- Ebenhof
- Ehenfeld
- Hölzlmühle
- Hummelmühle
- Kindlas
- Krickelsdorf
- Kricklhof
- Krondorf
- Massenricht
- Mittelmühle
- Obersteinbach
- Rödlas
- Sargmühle
- Scharhof
- Schwärzermühle
- Steiningloh
- Träglhof
- Untersteinbach
- Urspring
- Urspringermühle
- Waldmühle
- Weiher

== Economy ==
Kaolin, used for the production of porcelain, has been mined at Hirschau since 1901. Interesting is the Monte Kaolino, a 120 meter high mound made from 32,000,000 tons of quartz sand from excess sand in years of operation. It is now used as a (sand) skiing/camping resort during the summer months. It is also the place where the yearly Sandboarding Championships are held.

== Twin towns – sister cities ==
Hirschau is member of the so called "Kaolinstädtepartnerschaft". It connects cities, which are connected to the mineral Kaolin. The partnership was established in November 2004. Aside Hirschau the members of this partnership are the bavarian cities Tirschenreuth und Schnaittenbach, from Saxony Königswartha, Sornzig-Ablaß and the cities Mügeln and Nová Role from Czech Republic and Nowogrodziec from Poland.

== Notable people ==
- Ferdinand Janner (born 4 February 1836 in Hirschau – 1 November 1895 in Regensburg, Germany), German theologian
