= Château du Burgstall =

Ruined castle in Haut-Rhin, Grand Est, France

Coordinates: 47°54′39.2″N 7°12′35.1″E

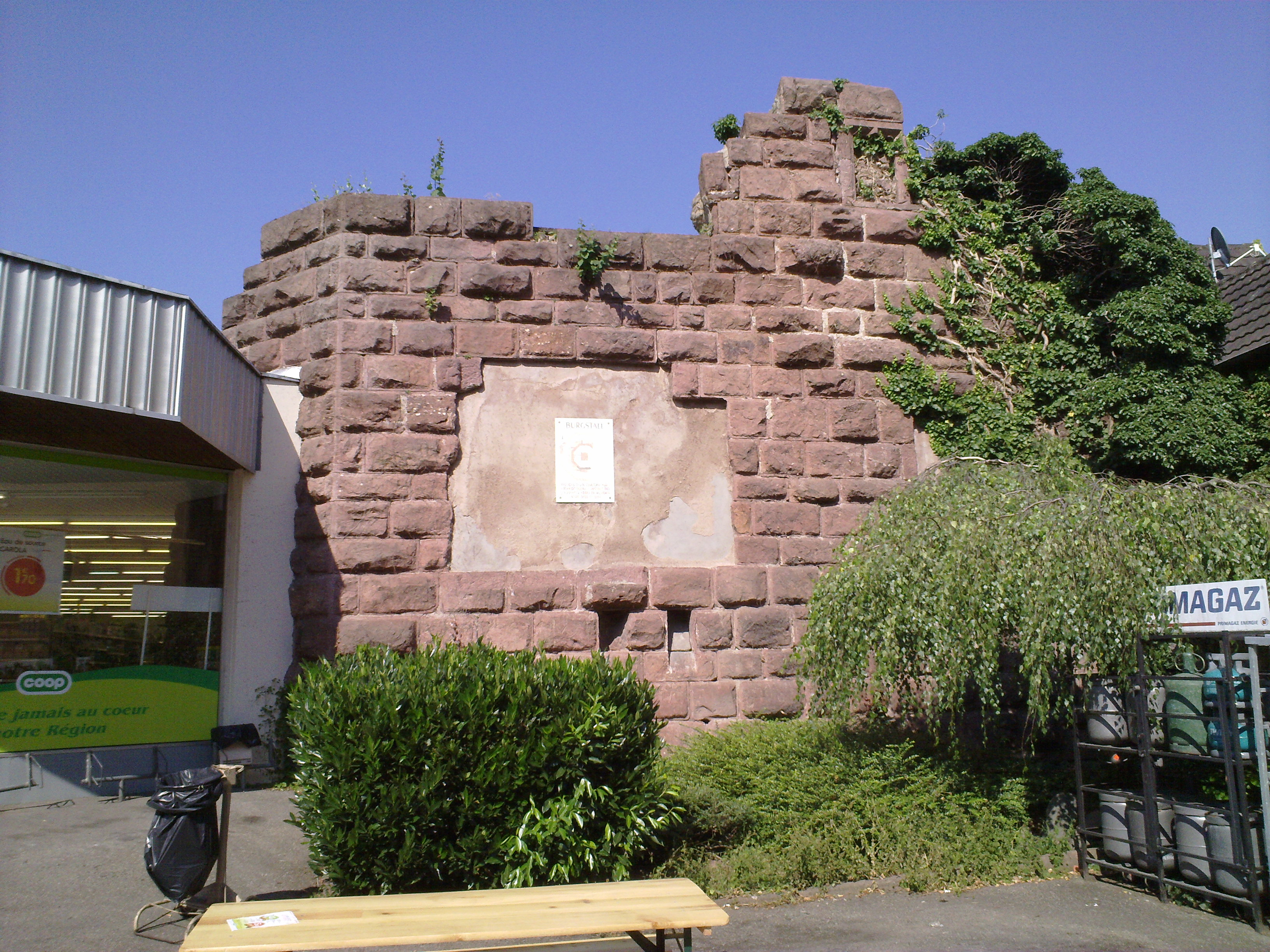
Ruins of Burgstall

The Château du Burgstall is a ruined castle in the commune of Guebwiller in the Haut-Rhin département of France.

The castle was believed to be lost. It is rarely mentioned in documents. During the 1960s, the ruins were partially uncovered during the construction of a supermarket.

The castle was built at the end of the 12th century or the beginning of the 13th. Masons' marks are evident. The remains indicate an octagonal structure. The castle is located in 124 Rue de la République, Guebwiller, and is private property.

== See also ==
- List of castles in France
