= Inzing =

- Municipality
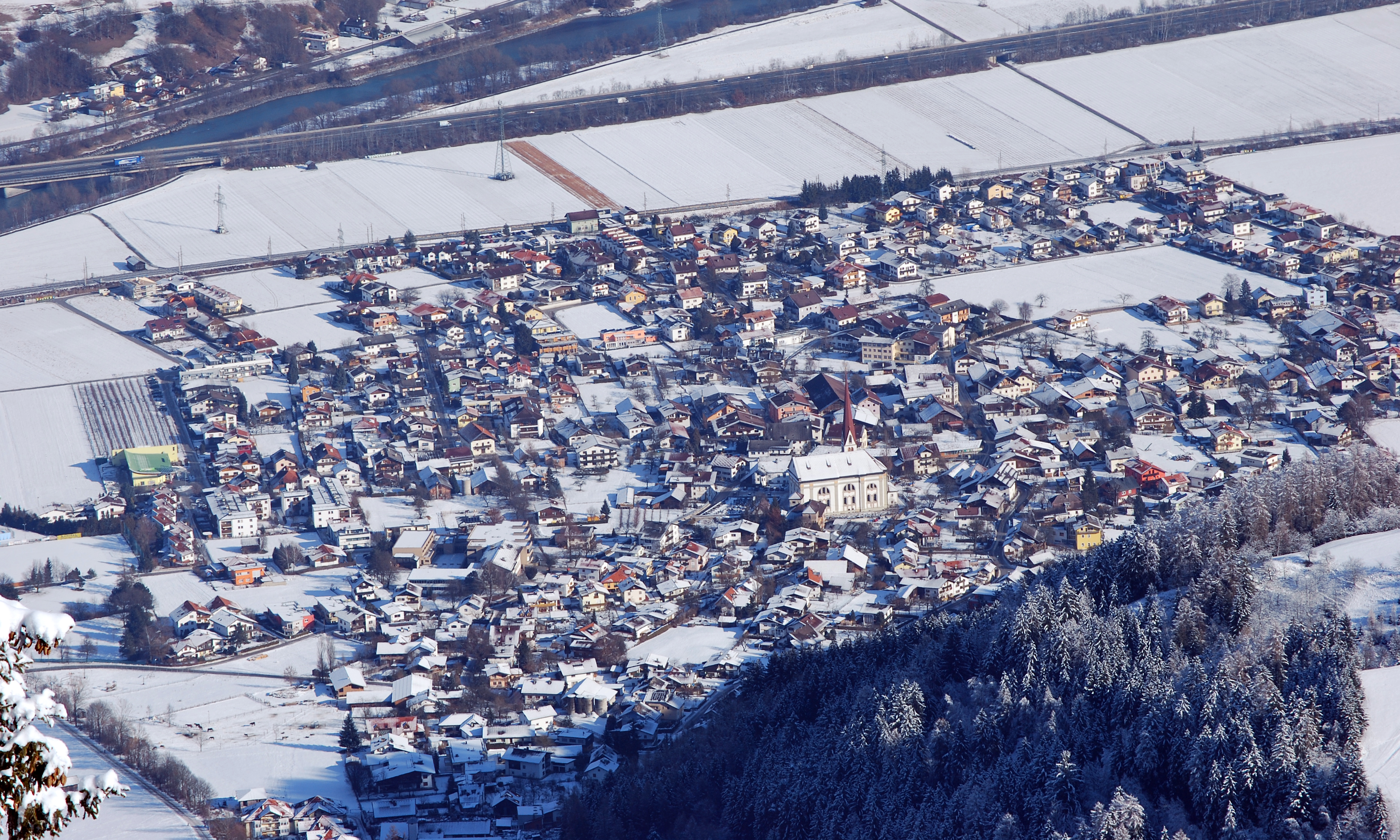
- Aerial view

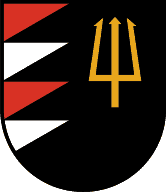
- Coat of arms

- Location within Austria
- Coordinates: 47°16′20″N 11°12′00″E
- Country: Austria
- State: Tyrol
- District: Innsbruck Land

Government
  - Mayor: Josef Walch (Aktives Inzing)

Area
  - Total: 19.37 km^{2} (7.48 sq mi)
- Elevation: 616 m (2,021 ft)

Population (2021)
  - Total: 3,990
  - Density: 206/km^{2} (534/sq mi)
- Time zone: UTC+1 (CET)
  - Summer (DST): UTC+2 (CEST)
- Postal code: 6401
- Area code: 05238
- Vehicle registration: IL
- Website: www.inzing.tirol.gv.at

Inzing is a town in the Austrian state of Tyrol.

== Geography ==
=== Location ===
Inzing is located in the Inntal between Innsbruck in east and Telfs in west. It lies on the southern bank of the Inn River. In the south of the town you see the Rangger Köpfl, in the north the Zirler Berg.

=== Neighbour municipalities ===
Flaurling, Gries im Sellrain, Hatting, Oberperfuss, Pettnau, Ranggen, Sankt Sigmund im Sellrain, Sellrain, Zirl.

== History ==
Inzing was first mentioned in a document in 1034. The district Hatting was attached 1974 to Inzing and 1993 as an own commune reconstituted.

== Population ==
Historical population
Year	Pop.	±%
1869	990	—
1880	864	−12.7%
1890	914	+5.8%
1900	905	−1.0%
1910	919	+1.5%
1923	986	+7.3%
1934	1,224	+24.1%
1939	1,307	+6.8%
1951	1,521	+16.4%
1961	1,723	+13.3%
1971	2,201	+27.7%
1981	2,717	+23.4%
1991	3,184	+17.2%
2001	3,184	+0.0%
2011	3,502	+10.0%

== Economy ==
The industrial district, which is located at the east of the village, includes timber processing.
