= Rietzer Grießkogel =

Mountain in Tyrol, Austria

Rietzer Grieskogel
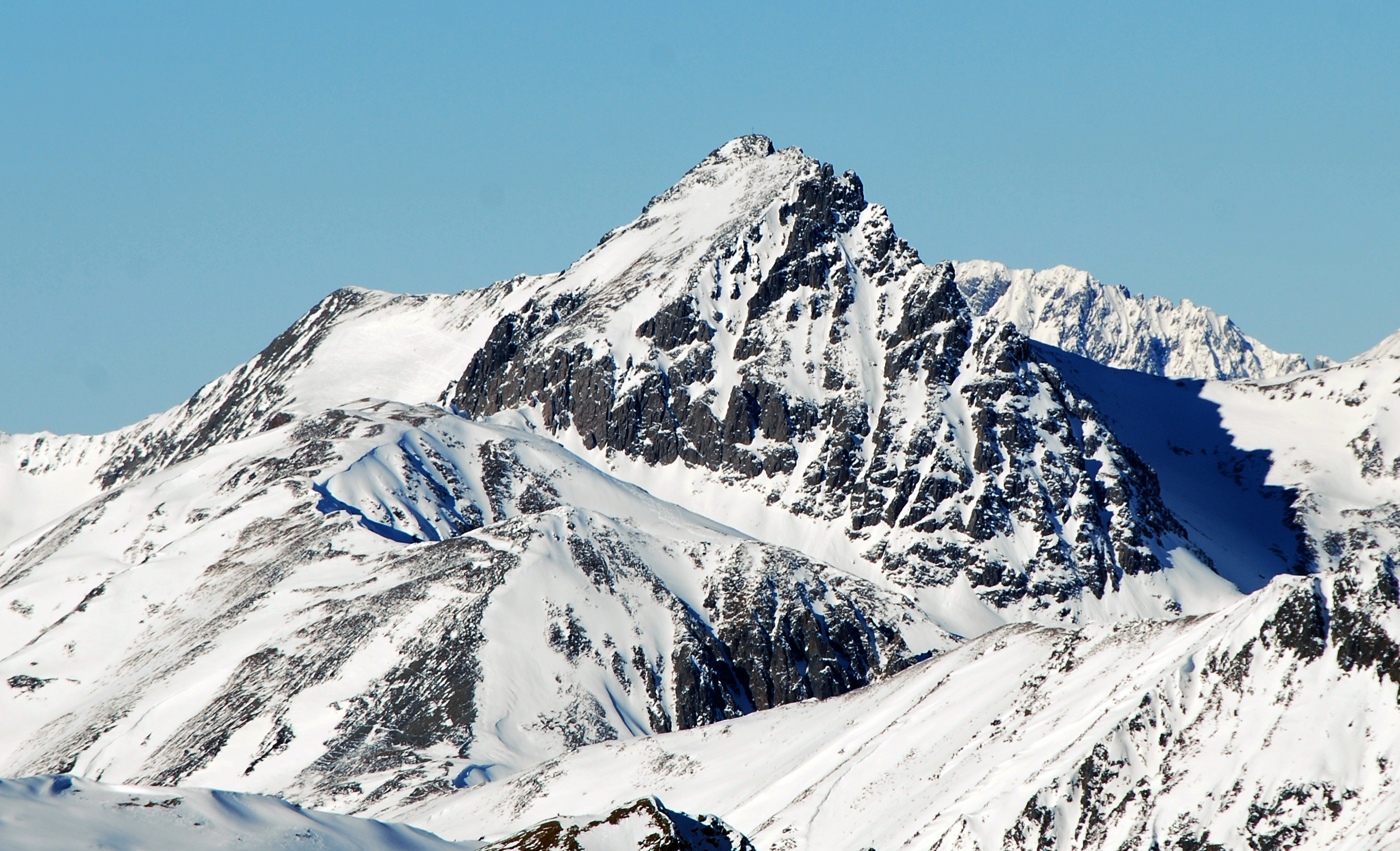
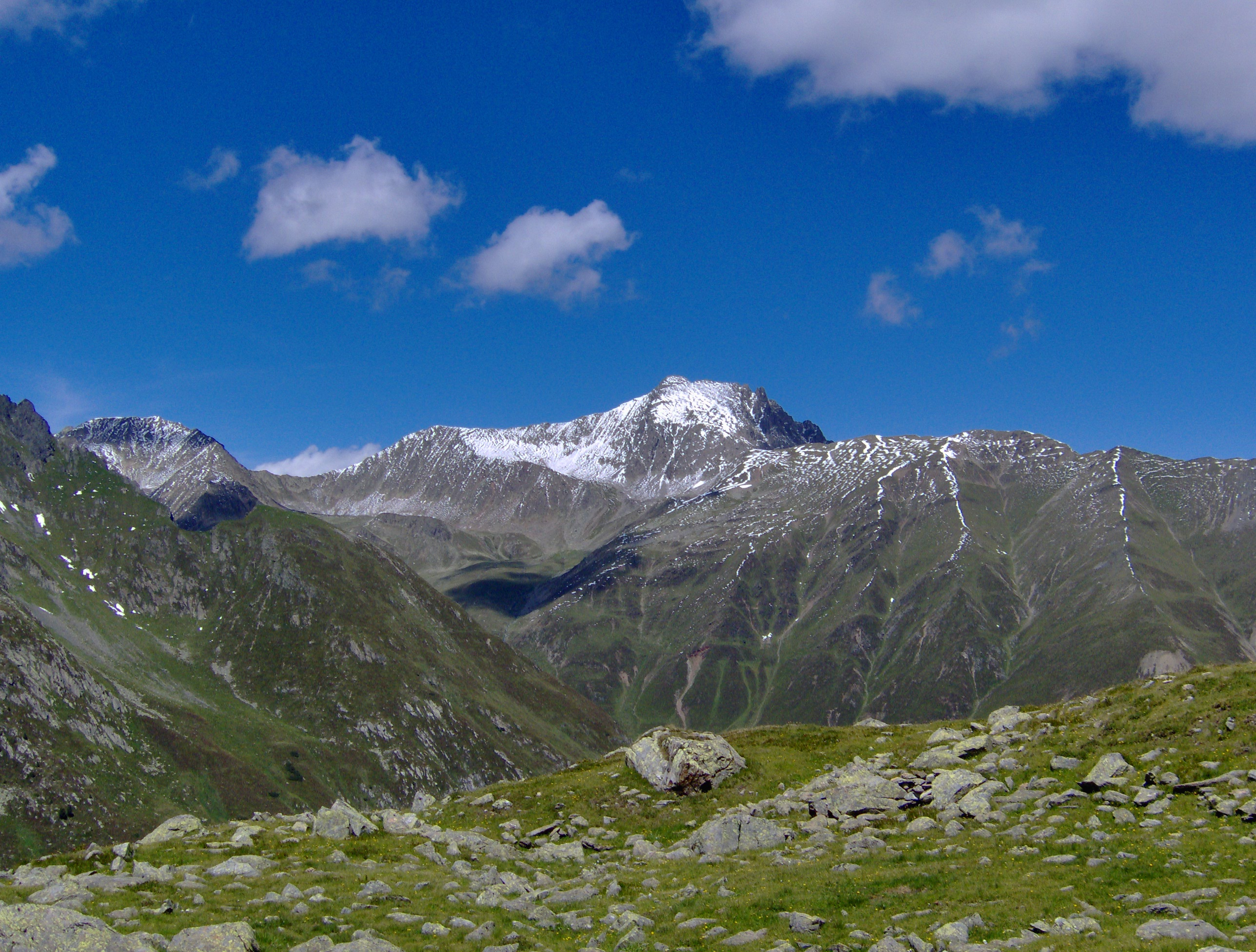
- The Rietzer Grießkogel from the southeast The Rietzer Grießkogel from the southwest

Highest point
- Elevation: 2,884 m (AA) (9,462 ft)
- Prominence: 2,884–2,017 m ↓ Kühtai
- Isolation: 7.1 km → Zwölferkogel
- Coordinates: 47°14′45″N 11°03′31″E

Geography
- Location within Austria
- Location: Tyrol, Austria
- Parent range: Stubai Alps

Climbing
- Normal route: Footpaths from the Inn Valley and Sellrain Valley

The Rietzer Grießkogel (also: Grieskogel) is a mountain, 2,884 m (AA), and the highest peak in the Northern Sellrain Mountains, part of the Stubai Alps in the Austrian state of Tyrol. The summit is easily climbed on path no. 153. The first documented ascent was undertaken in 1829 by Innsbruck botanist, Andrä Sauter, a brother of Anton Sauter. As a result of its easy accessibility on well marked paths from Telfs in the Inn Valley and from the Sellrain Valley, it is a popular destination. Its name is derived from the village of Rietz at its northern foot in the district of Imst in the upper Inn valley.

== Location and surrounding area ==
The Rietzer Grießkogel lies just under eight kilometres as the crow flies south of Telfs, 27 kilometres west of Innsbruck and five kilometres northwest of St. Sigmund im Sellrain. Its neighbouring summits are the Bachwandkopf (2,758 m) to the west, the Hocheder (2,798 m) to the northeast and the Schartenkogel (2,603 m) to the southeast. To the southwest the Rietzer Grießkogel drops into the Alpine pasture of Oberer Zirmbachalm (2,100 m) with gradients of 30 to 50°.

== Geology ==
Geologically viewed, the Northern Sellrain Mountains belong to the Ötztal Gneiss, which forms the rocks here. Particularly strong elements of this rock are biotite-granite gneiss, a mixed crystal from the Annite-Phlogopite series. Because this rock is easily weathered and eroded, for example by frost weathering, the mountains in this region are less rugged and easier from climb from an alpinistic perspective.

== Bases and routes ==
The Rietzer Grießkogel may be reached from the north from the Peter Anich Hut (1,909 m), which lies above Telfs to the south. Path no. 153 runs in a southerly direction initially over the Bachwandkopf peak, then along the west arête to the summit in, according to the literature, 3½ hours. From the south it takes about 4½ hours on the path from Kühtai or Haggen in the Sellrain valley along the Zirmbach stream and up the southwestern flank of the mountain. This ascent is also one of the most popular ski tours of the region. Another path runs from Flaurling via the Flaurlinger Alm from the east to the top.

== Literature and maps ==
- Walter Klier: Alpine Club guide Stubaier Alpen, Munich, 2006, ISBN 3-7633-1271-4
- Alpine Club map 1:25,000, Sheet 31/2 Stubaier Alpen, Sellrain (the Rietzer Grießkogel lies on the extreme upper edge of the map)
- Kompass hiking map 1:50,000, Sheet WK 35, Imst-Telfs-Kühtai
