= Oberhofen im Inntal =

- Municipality
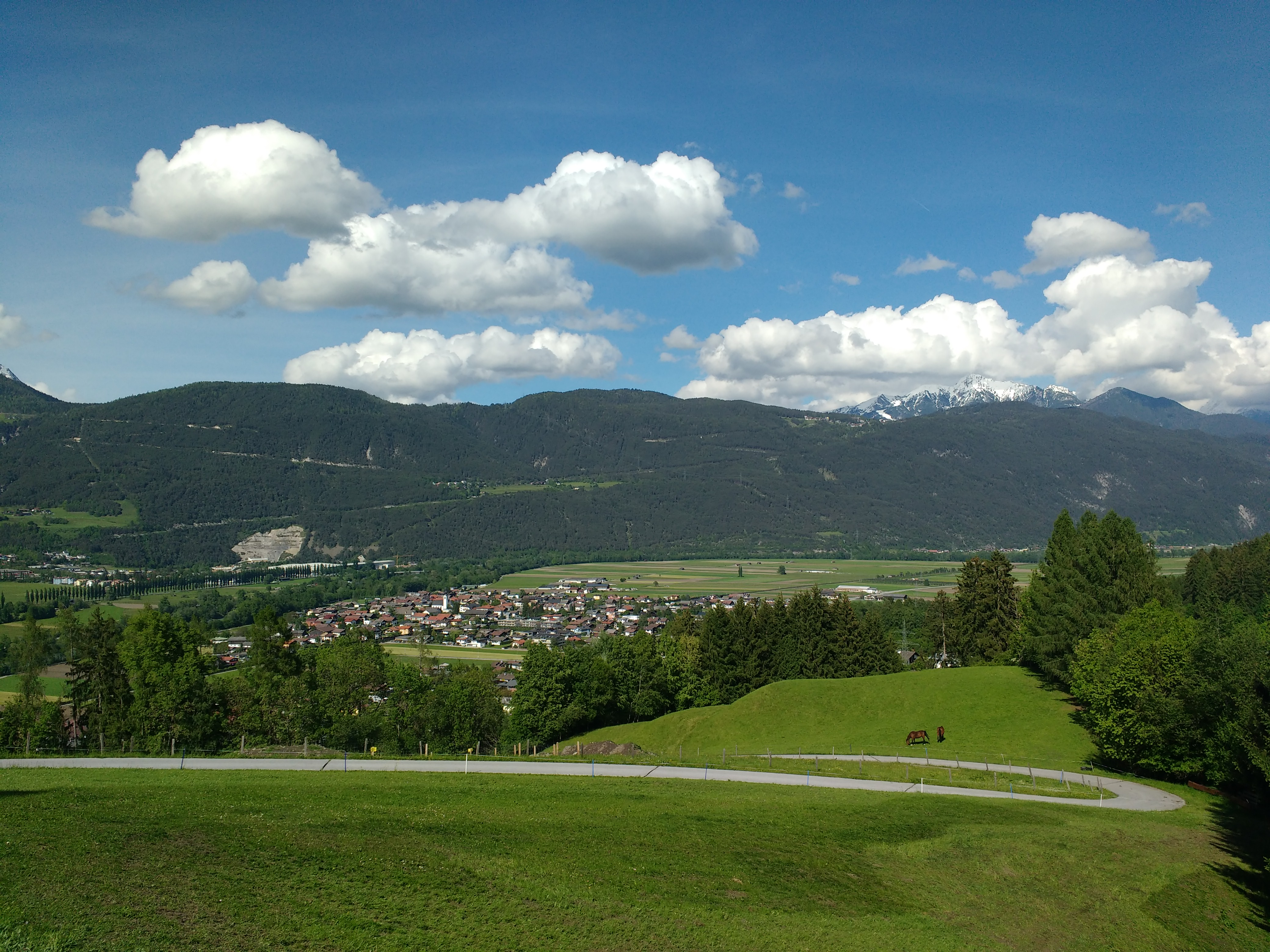
- View of Oberhofen

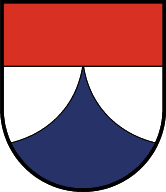
- Coat of arms

- Location within Austria
- Coordinates: 47°18′11″N 11°05′45″E
- Country: Austria
- State: Tyrol
- District: Innsbruck Land

Government
  - Mayor: Peter Daum (ÖVP)

Area
  - Total: 18.57 km^{2} (7.17 sq mi)
- Elevation: 622 m (2,041 ft)

Population (2021)
  - Total: 1,902
  - Density: 102.4/km^{2} (265.3/sq mi)
- Time zone: UTC+1 (CET)
  - Summer (DST): UTC+2 (CEST)
- Postal code: 6406
- Area code: 05262
- Vehicle registration: IL
- Website: www.oberhofen.tirol.gv.at

Oberhofen im Inntal is a municipality in the western district of Innsbruck-Land in the Austrian state of Tyrol located 21 km west of Innsbruck and 2.6 km east of Telfs. Once a part of Pfaffenhofen it became its own municipality in 1786.

== Population ==
Historical population
Year	Pop.	±%
1869	743	—
1880	685	−7.8%
1890	693	+1.2%
1900	674	−2.7%
1910	673	−0.1%
1923	673	+0.0%
1934	647	−3.9%
1939	684	+5.7%
1951	765	+11.8%
1961	826	+8.0%
1971	965	+16.8%
1981	1,129	+17.0%
1991	1,467	+29.9%
2001	1,624	+10.7%
2011	1,682	+3.6%
