= Wildermieming =

- Municipality
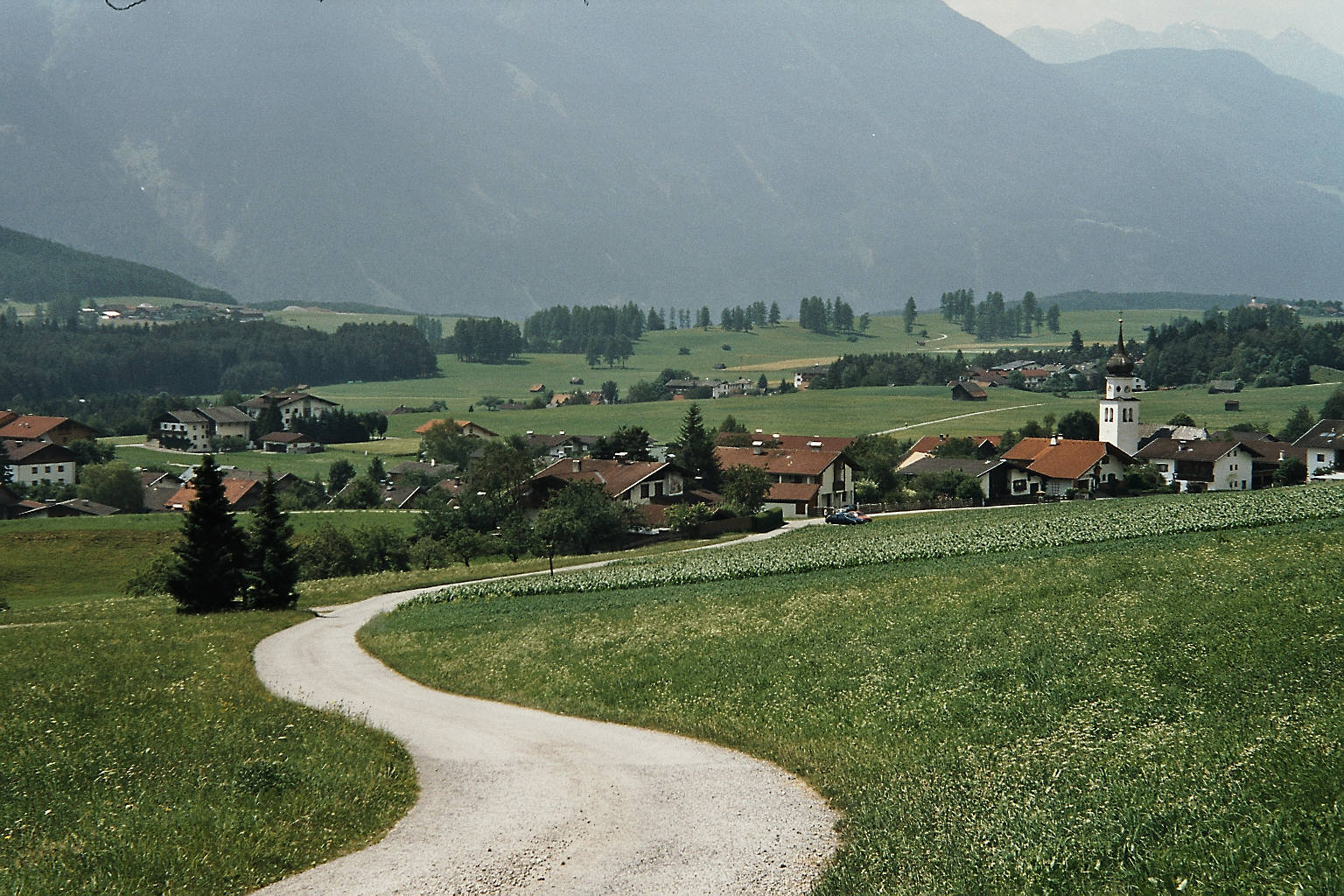

- Coat of arms

- Location within Austria
- Coordinates: 47°19′06″N 11°00′23″E
- Country: Austria
- State: Tyrol
- District: Innsbruck Land

Government
  - Mayor: Klaus Stocker

Area
  - Total: 31.24 km^{2} (12.06 sq mi)
- Elevation: 872 m (2,861 ft)

Population (2020)
  - Total: 972
  - Density: 31.1/km^{2} (80.6/sq mi)
- Time zone: UTC+1 (CET)
  - Summer (DST): UTC+2 (CEST)
- Postal code: 6414
- Area code: 05264
- Vehicle registration: IL
- Website: www.wildermieming. tirol.gv.at

Wildermieming is a municipality in the district of Innsbruck-Land in the Austrian state of Tyrol located 40 km west of Innsbruck and 4 km west of Telfs. The village was separated from Mieming which belongs to Imst (district) in 1833 and was incorporated into Innsbruck-Land in 1925.

== Population ==
Historical population
Year	Pop.	±%
1869	405	—
1880	386	−4.7%
1890	340	−11.9%
1900	323	−5.0%
1910	328	+1.5%
1923	330	+0.6%
1934	347	+5.2%
1939	314	−9.5%
1951	352	+12.1%
1961	364	+3.4%
1971	465	+27.7%
1981	586	+26.0%
1991	684	+16.7%
2001	772	+12.9%
2011	864	+11.9%
