= Kolsassberg =

- Municipality
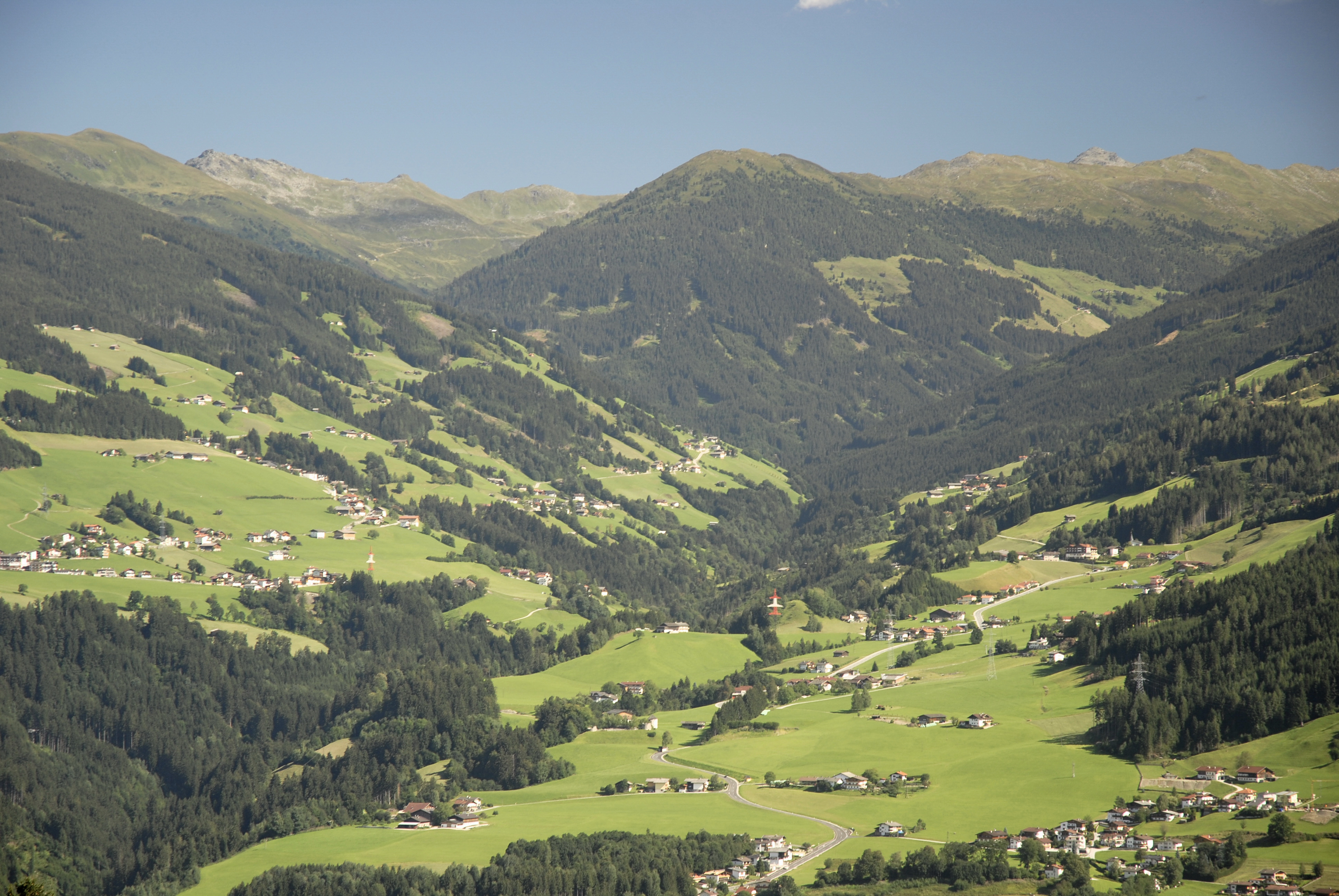
- View of Kolsassberg and Innerweerberg

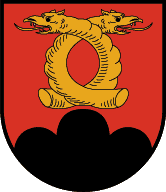
- Coat of arms

- Location within Austria
- Coordinates: 47°16′57″N 11°39′06″E
- Country: Austria
- State: Tyrol
- District: Innsbruck Land

Government
  - Mayor: Josef Gruber

Area
  - Total: 35.37 km^{2} (13.66 sq mi)
- Elevation: 906 m (2,972 ft)

Population (2021)
  - Total: 834
  - Density: 23.6/km^{2} (61.1/sq mi)
- Time zone: UTC+1 (CET)
  - Summer (DST): UTC+2 (CEST)
- Postal code: 6114
- Area code: 05224
- Vehicle registration: IL
- Website: www.kolsassberg.tirol.gv.at

Kolsassberg is a municipality in the district Innsbruck-Land in the Austrian state of Tyrol located about 19 km east of Innsbruck and 2 km above Kolsass. The location was founded around 1196.

== Population ==
Historical population
Year	Pop.	±%
1869	384	—
1880	367	−4.4%
1890	347	−5.4%
1900	358	+3.2%
1910	375	+4.7%
1923	367	−2.1%
1934	400	+9.0%
1939	378	−5.5%
1951	377	−0.3%
1961	380	+0.8%
1971	454	+19.5%
1981	510	+12.3%
1991	568	+11.4%
2001	721	+26.9%
2011	742	+2.9%
