= Grießkogel =

Grießkogel or Grieskogel is the name of the following mountains in Austria:

- Breiter Grießkogel (3,287 m0, near Längenfeld in the Stubai Alps
- Grießkogel (Glockner Group) (3,066 m), in the Glockner Group of the High Tauern
- Grießkogel (Steinernes Meer) (2,543 m), in the Steinernes Meer
- Grießkogel (Tennen) (2,270 m), in the Tennen Mountains
- Kühtaier Grießkogel (Hinterer 2,673 m and Vorderer 2,666 m), near Kühtai in the Sellrain Mountains (Ötztal Alps)
- Praxmarer Grieskogel (2,711 m), near Praxmar in the Sellrain in the Stubai Alps
- Rietzer Grießkogel (2,884 m), above Telfs and Kühtai in the Sellrain Mountains (Ötztal Alps)
- Söldner Grieskogel (2,911 m), on the Geigenkamm ridge of the Ötztal Alps
