= Polling in Tirol =

- Municipality
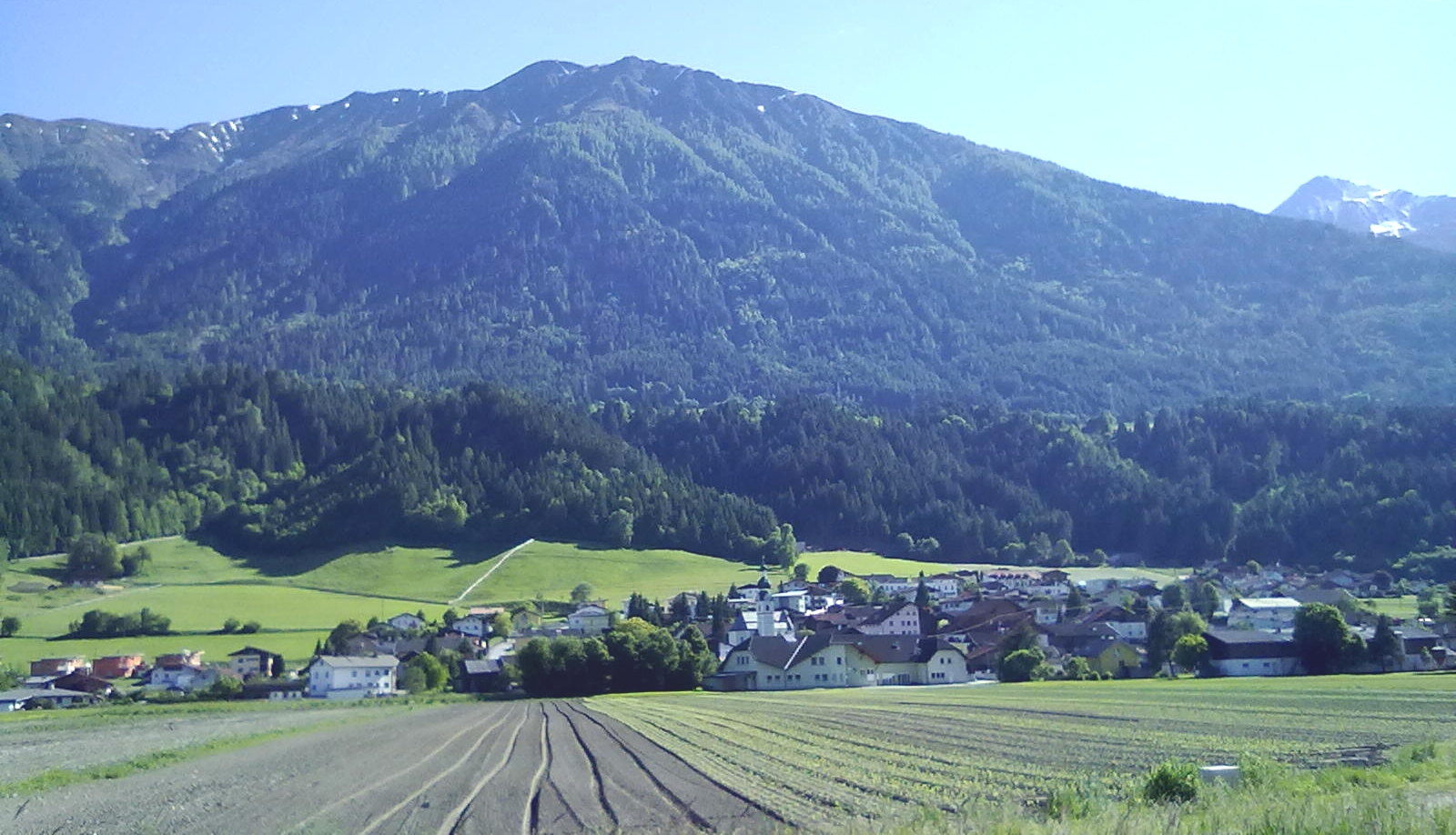
- Polling in Tirol

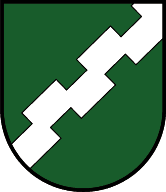
- Coat of arms

- Location within Austria
- Coordinates: 47°16′53″N 11°09′02″E
- Country: Austria
- State: Tyrol
- District: Innsbruck Land

Government
  - Mayor: Gottlieb Jäger

Area
  - Total: 4.97 km^{2} (1.92 sq mi)
- Elevation: 615 m (2,018 ft)

Population (2021)
  - Total: 1,282
  - Density: 258/km^{2} (668/sq mi)
- Time zone: UTC+1 (CET)
  - Summer (DST): UTC+2 (CEST)
- Postal code: 6404
- Area code: 05238
- Vehicle registration: IL
- Website: www.polling.at

Polling in Tirol is a municipality in the district of Innsbruck-Land in the Austrian state of Tyrol located 17 km west of Innsbruck and 7 km before Telfs. The location was mentioned as “Pollinga” in 763 for the first time.

== Population ==
Historical population
Year	Pop.	±%
1869	290	—
1880	266	−8.3%
1890	245	−7.9%
1900	251	+2.4%
1910	270	+7.6%
1923	327	+21.1%
1934	304	−7.0%
1939	288	−5.3%
1951	386	+34.0%
1961	369	−4.4%
1971	426	+15.4%
1981	543	+27.5%
1991	650	+19.7%
2001	780	+20.0%
2011	952	+22.1%
