= Pettnau =

- Municipality
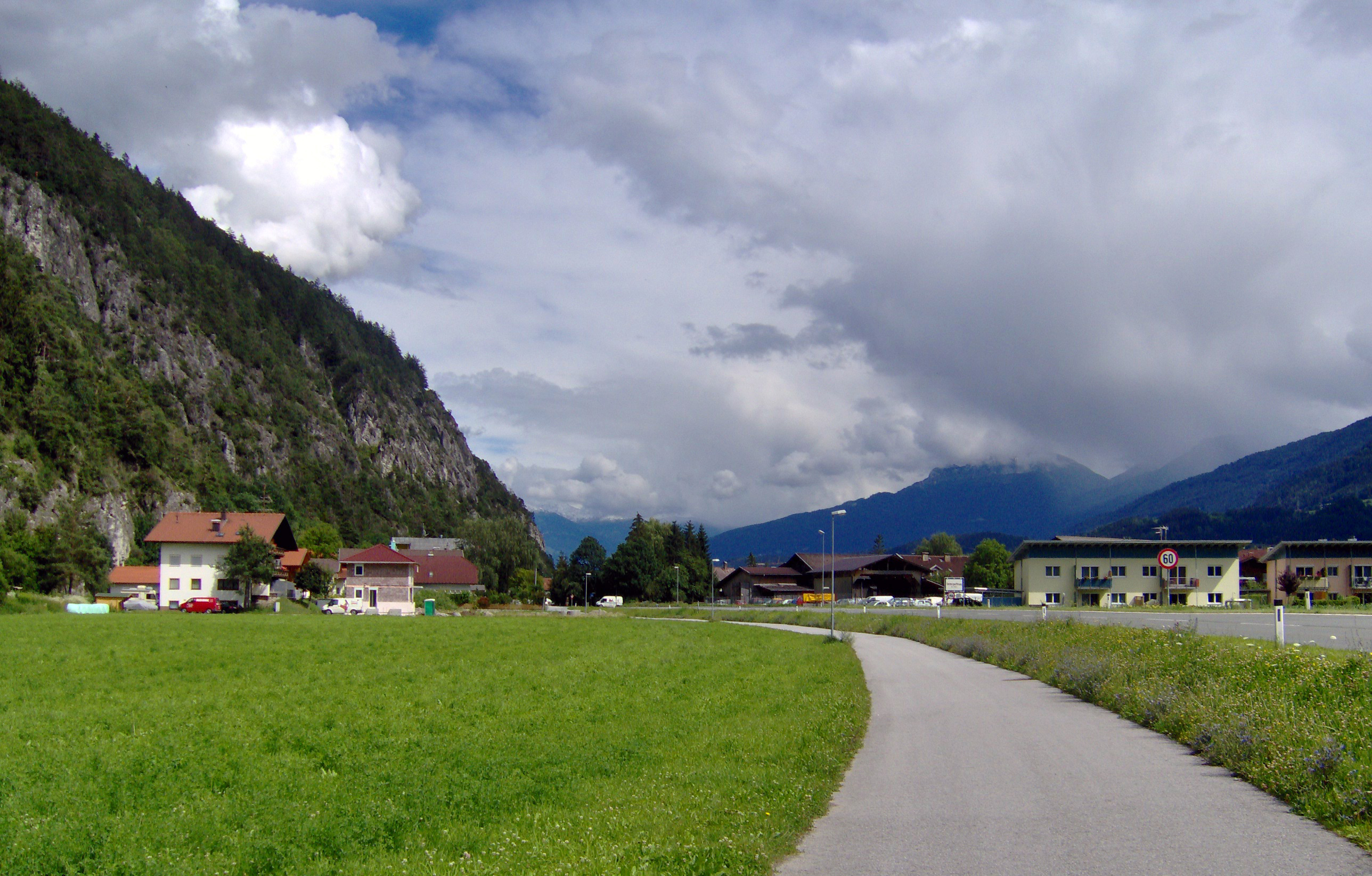

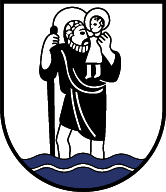
- Coat of arms

- Location within Austria
- Coordinates: 47°17′31″N 11°09′36″E
- Country: Austria
- State: Tyrol
- District: Innsbruck Land

Government
  - Mayor: Martin Schwaninger

Area
  - Total: 10.78 km^{2} (4.16 sq mi)
- Elevation: 628 m (2,060 ft)

Population (2021)
  - Total: 1,064
  - Density: 98.70/km^{2} (255.6/sq mi)
- Time zone: UTC+1 (CET)
  - Summer (DST): UTC+2 (CEST)
- Postal code: 6408
- Area code: 05238
- Vehicle registration: IL
- Website: www.pettnau.at

Pettnau is a municipality in the district of Innsbruck-Land in the Austrian state of Tyrol located 16.7 km west of Innsbruck north of the Inn River between Telfs and Zirl. It has seven parts and was founded around 1291.

== Population ==
Historical population
Year	Pop.	±%
1869	313	—
1880	280	−10.5%
1890	260	−7.1%
1900	261	+0.4%
1910	279	+6.9%
1923	264	−5.4%
1934	347	+31.4%
1939	334	−3.7%
1951	367	+9.9%
1961	386	+5.2%
1971	626	+62.2%
1981	761	+21.6%
1991	808	+6.2%
2001	977	+20.9%
2011	893	−8.6%

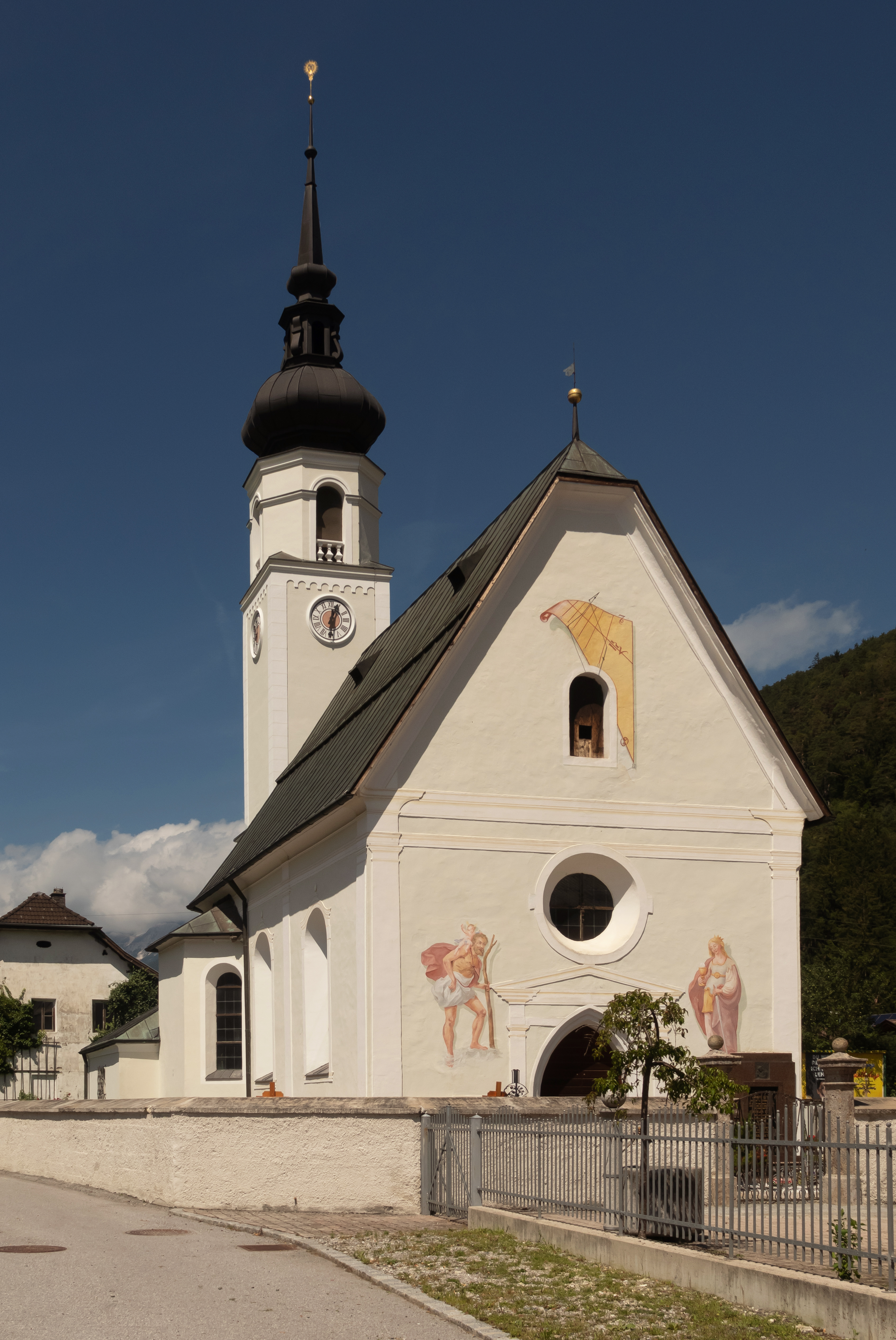
Pettnau, church: katholische Filialkirche Sankt Josef

== Sights ==
Worth seeing in Pettnau are the St. Georgskirche, which has been built in 1090 and the Mellaunerhof, the oldest inn in the Tyrol, as well as the sculpture garden of Bernhard Witsch.
