= Völs, Tyrol =

Völs
- Municipality
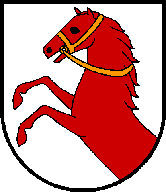
- Coat of arms

- Location within Austria
- Coordinates: 47°15′00″N 11°20′00″E
- Country: Austria
- State: Tyrol
- District: Innsbruck Land
- Established: 1188

Government
  - Mayor: Peter Lobenwein (SPÖ)

Area
  - Total: 5.62 km^{2} (2.17 sq mi)
- Elevation: 574 m (1,883 ft)

Population (2020)
  - Total: 6,938
  - Density: 1,230/km^{2} (3,200/sq mi)
- Time zone: UTC+1 (CET)
  - Summer (DST): UTC+2 (CEST)
- Postal code: 6176
- Area code: 0 512
- Vehicle registration: IL
- Website: www.voels.at

Völs is a market town in the district of Innsbruck-Land in the Austrian state of Tyrol, located at the western border of Innsbruck. It was mentioned for the first time in documents in 1188.

It serves as a shopping center and storage area for the city of Innsbruck.

== Population ==
Historical population
Year	Pop.	±%
1869	449	—
1880	417	−7.1%
1890	406	−2.6%
1900	378	−6.9%
1910	782	+106.9%
1923	728	−6.9%
1934	866	+19.0%
1939	908	+4.8%
1951	1,027	+13.1%
1961	1,827	+77.9%
1971	2,743	+50.1%
1981	5,931	+116.2%
1991	7,079	+19.4%
2001	6,610	−6.6%
2011	6,537	−1.1%
2018	6,738	+3.1%
2021	6,963	+3.3%

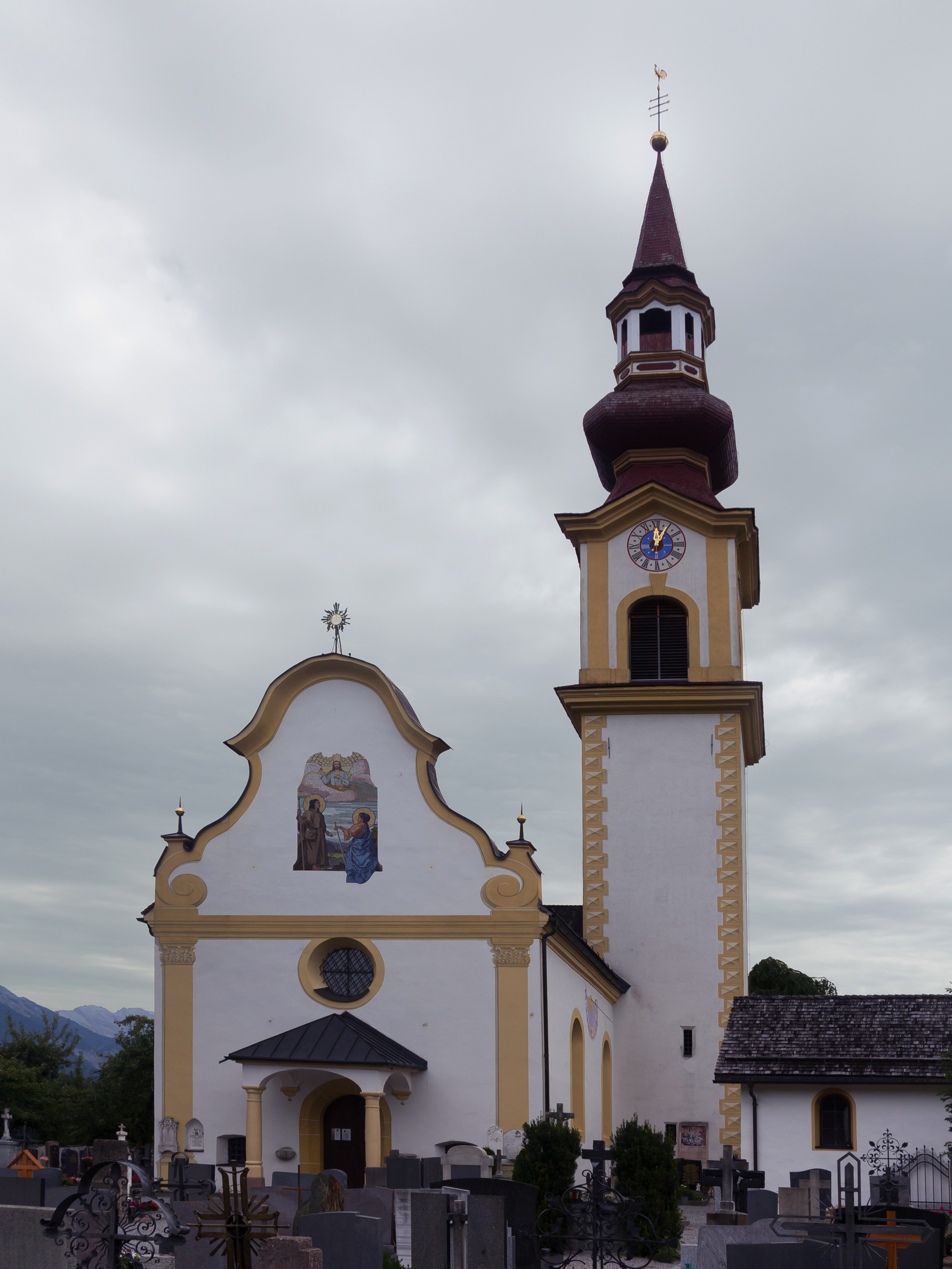
Church (Alte Pfarrkirche heilige Jodok und Lucia) with churchyard and cemetery
