= Ellbögen =

- Municipality
- Coat of arms

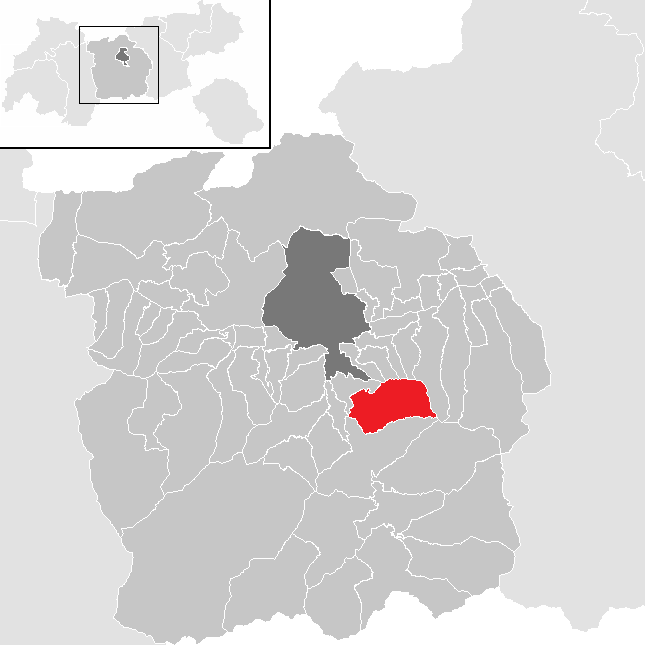
- Location in the district

- Location within Austria
- Coordinates: 47°10′00″N 11°26′00″E
- Country: Austria
- State: Tyrol
- District: Innsbruck Land

Government
  - Mayor: Walter Hofer

Area
  - Total: 34.47 km^{2} (13.31 sq mi)
- Elevation: 1,070 m (3,510 ft)

Population (2018-01-01)
  - Total: 1,109
  - Density: 32.17/km^{2} (83.33/sq mi)
- Time zone: UTC+1 (CET)
  - Summer (DST): UTC+2 (CEST)
- Postal code: 6083
- Area code: 0512
- Vehicle registration: IL
- Website: www.ellboegen.at

Ellbögen is a community in the district of Innsbruck Land and lies 12 km south of Innsbruck. It is a scattered village located on the eastern valley side of the Wipptal.

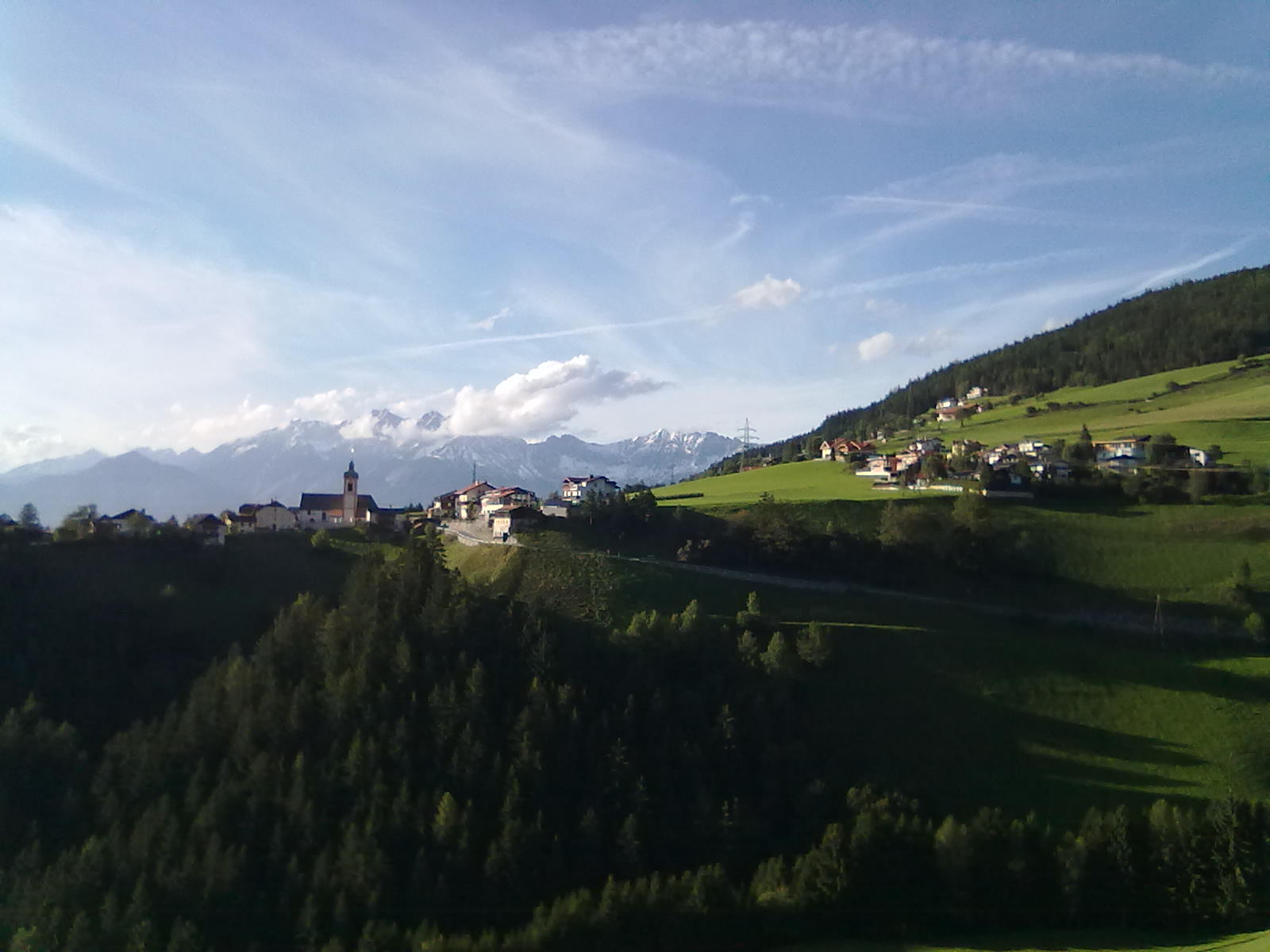
St. Peter
