= Innsbruck-Land District =

Coordinates: 47.2°N 11.4°E

Innsbruck-Land District Bezirk Innsbruck-Land
- District
- Country: Austria
- State: Tyrol
- Number of municipalities: 63
- Administrative seat: Innsbruck

Government
  - District Governor: Kathrin Eberle

Area
  - Total: 1,990.17 km^{2} (768.41 sq mi)

Population (2021)
  - Total: 181,698
  - Density: 91.2977/km^{2} (236.460/sq mi)
- Time zone: UTC+01:00 (CET)
  - Summer (DST): UTC+02:00 (CEST)
- Vehicle registration: IL
- NUTS code: ?

The Bezirk Innsbruck-Land is an administrative district (Bezirk) in Tyrol, Austria. It encloses the Statutarstadt Innsbruck, and borders Bavaria (Germany) in the north, the district Schwaz in the east, South Tyrol in Italy to the south, and the district of Imst in the west.

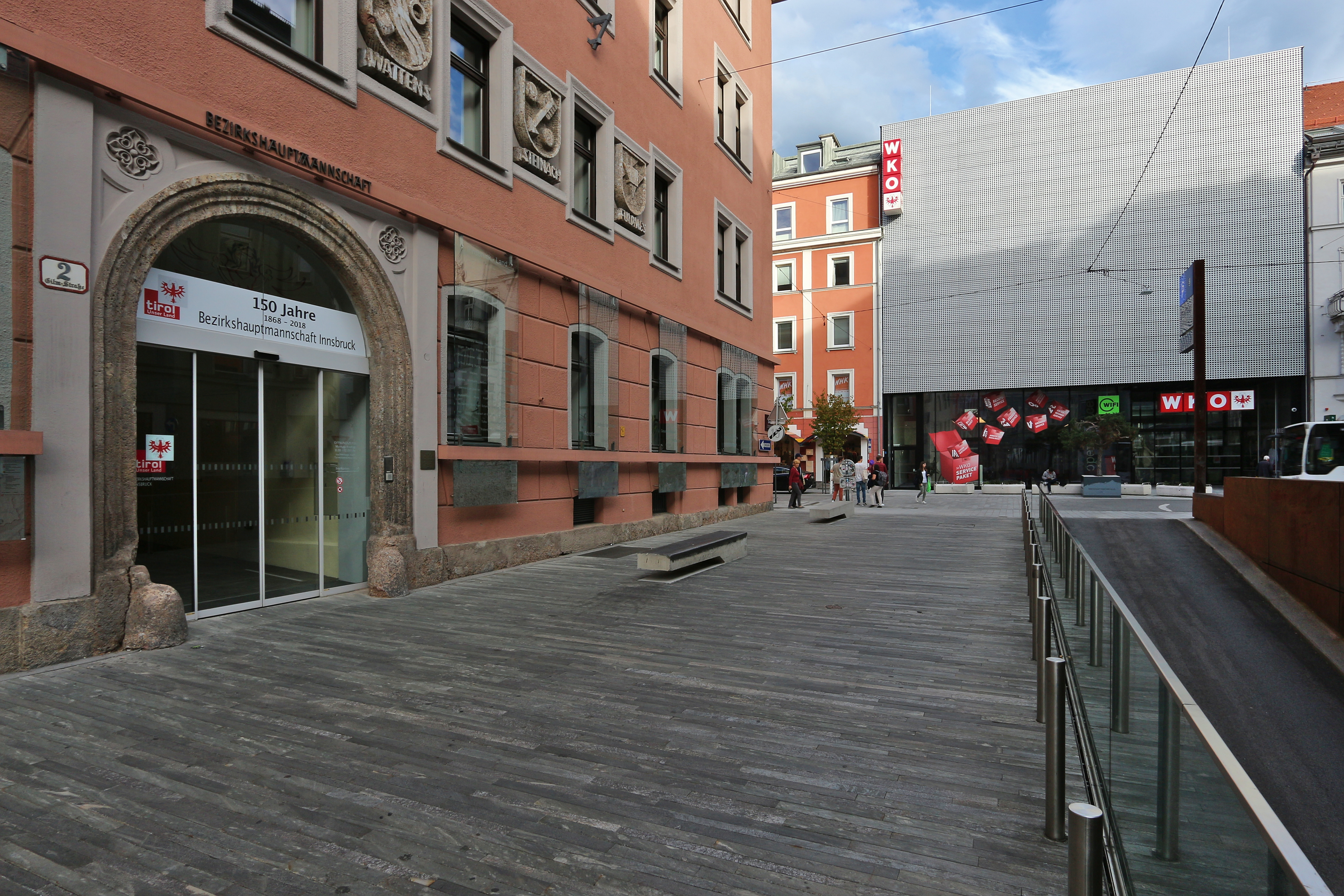
Administrative office in Innsbruck

Area of the district is 1,990.17 km^{2}, with a population of 181,698 (January 1, 2021), and population density of 91 persons per km^{2}. Administrative center of the district is Innsbruck, located outside of the district itself.

== Geography ==
The district comprises a part of the Inn valley, the North Tyrolean parts of the Wipptal valley and its tributary valleys Stubaital, Sellraintal, Gschnitztal, and Wattental, as well as the Seefelder Plateau.

The southern border with the Brennerpass is formed by main line of the Alps. The district is dominated by alpine areas, including the mountain ranges of the Stubai Alps in the southwest, Tux Alps in the southeast, and Wetterstein Mountains and Karwendel in the north.

Historical population
Year	Pop.	±%
1869	43,319	—
1880	43,268	−0.1%
1890	43,625	+0.8%
1900	45,027	+3.2%
1910	52,474	+16.5%
1923	52,981	+1.0%
1934	61,614	+16.3%
1939	64,613	+4.9%
1951	78,131	+20.9%
1961	86,174	+10.3%
1971	107,834	+25.1%
1981	125,299	+16.2%
1991	141,334	+12.8%
2001	154,940	+9.6%
2021	181,698	+17.3%
Source: Statistik Austria

== Administrative divisions ==
The municipalities of the district:

- Absam (6,735)
- Aldrans (2,229)
- Ampass (1,674)
- Axams (5,589)
- Baumkirchen (1,151)
- Birgitz (1,324)
- Ellbögen (1,072)
- Flaurling (1,208)
- Fritzens (2,041)
- Fulpmes (4,202)
- Gnadenwald (729)
- Götzens (3,935)
- Gries am Brenner (1,287)
- Gries im Sellrain (581)
- Grinzens (1,342)
- Gschnitz (427)
- Hall in Tirol (12,895)
- Hatting (1,232)
- Inzing (3,524)
- Kematen in Tirol (2,557)
- Kolsass (1,550)
- Kolsassberg (748)
- Lans (926)
- Leutasch (2,220)
- Matrei am Brenner (3,493)
- Mieders (1,756)
- Mils (4,117)
- Mutters (1,990)
- Natters (1,846)
- Navis (1,951)
- Neustift im Stubaital (4,580)
- Oberhofen im Inntal (1,692)
- Obernberg am Brenner (361)
- Oberperfuss (2,843)
- Patsch (1,011)
- Pettnau (912)
- Pfaffenhofen (1,090)
- Polling in Tirol (965)
- Ranggen (983)
- Reith bei Seefeld (1,231)
- Rinn (1,676)
- Rum (8,876)
- Sankt Sigmund im Sellrain (170)
- Scharnitz (1,328)
- Schmirn (875)
- Schönberg im Stubaital (1,013)
- Seefeld in Tirol (3,241)
- Sellrain (1,348)
- Sistrans (2,115)
- Steinach am Brenner (3,361)
- Telfes im Stubai (1,488)
- Telfs (14,736)
- Thaur (3,791)
- Trins (1,277)
- Tulfes (1,411)
- Unterperfuss (196)
- Vals (563)
- Volders (4,328)
- Völs (6,502)
- Wattenberg (715)
- Wattens (7,689)
- Wildermieming (871)
- Zirl (7,770)
