= Pfaffenhofen, Tyrol =

Pfaffenhofen
- Municipality
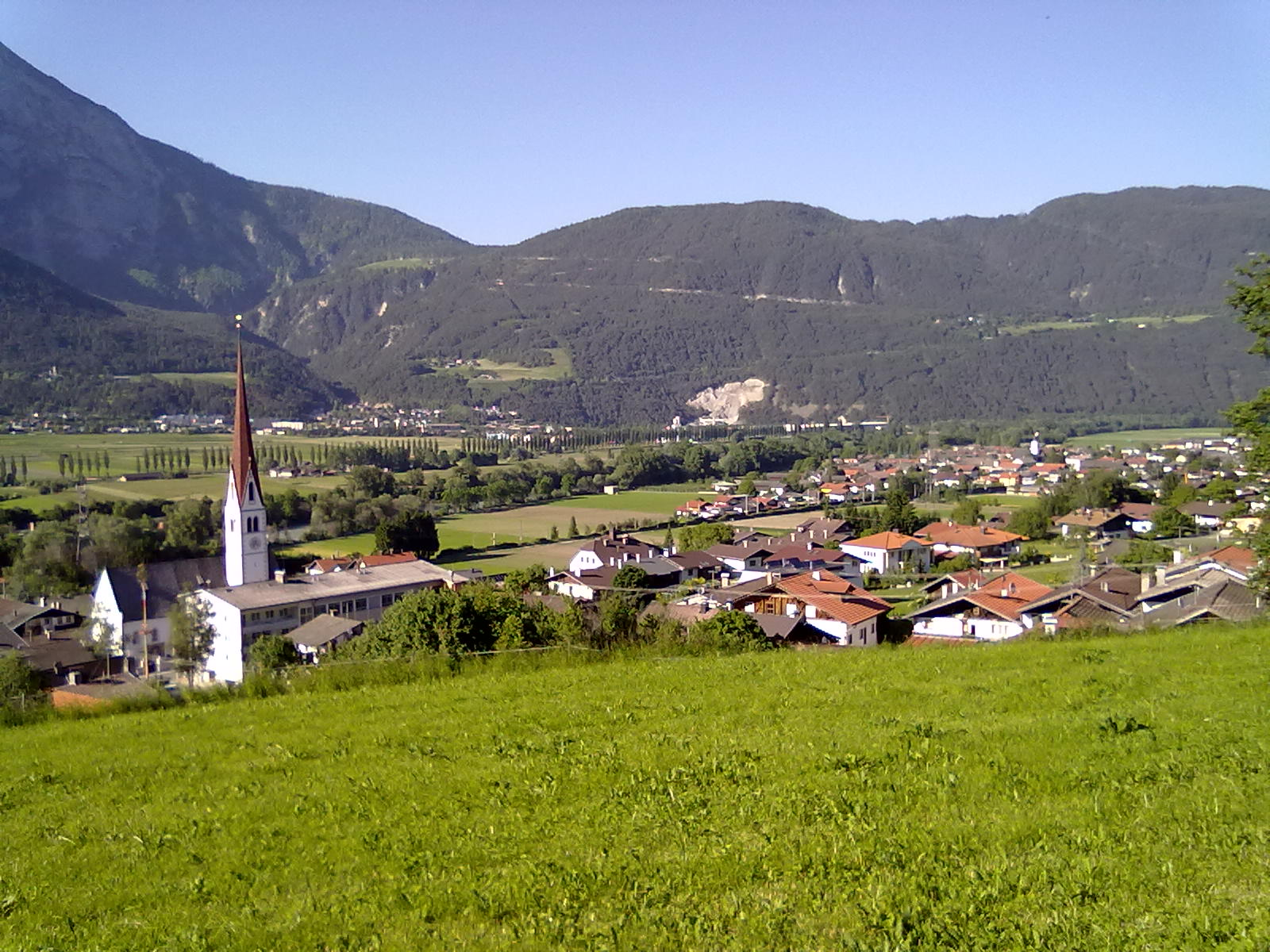

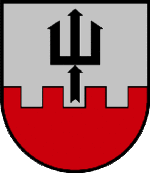
- Coat of arms

- Location within Austria
- Coordinates: 47°17′00″N 11°04′00″E
- Country: Austria
- State: Tyrol
- District: Innsbruck Land

Government
  - Mayor: Andreas Schmid

Area
  - Total: 7 km^{2} (2.7 sq mi)
- Elevation: 642 m (2,106 ft)

Population (2021)
  - Total: 1,185
  - Density: 170/km^{2} (440/sq mi)
- Time zone: UTC+1 (CET)
  - Summer (DST): UTC+2 (CEST)
- Postal code: 6405
- Area code: 05262
- Vehicle registration: IL
- Website: www.pfaffenhofen.tirol.gv.at

Pfaffenhofen (German pronunciation: [pfafn̩ˈhoːfn̩]) is a municipality in the district of Innsbruck-Land in the Austrian state of Tyrol located 22 km west of Innsbruck and 1.7 km south of Telfs. The village was mentioned in documents in 1197 for the first time.

== Population ==
Historical population
Year	Pop.	±%
1869	353	—
1880	398	+12.7%
1890	463	+16.3%
1900	510	+10.2%
1910	541	+6.1%
1923	625	+15.5%
1934	677	+8.3%
1939	686	+1.3%
1951	742	+8.2%
1961	762	+2.7%
1971	885	+16.1%
1981	954	+7.8%
1991	979	+2.6%
2001	1,113	+13.7%
2011	1,062	−4.6%
