= Grinzens =

- Municipality
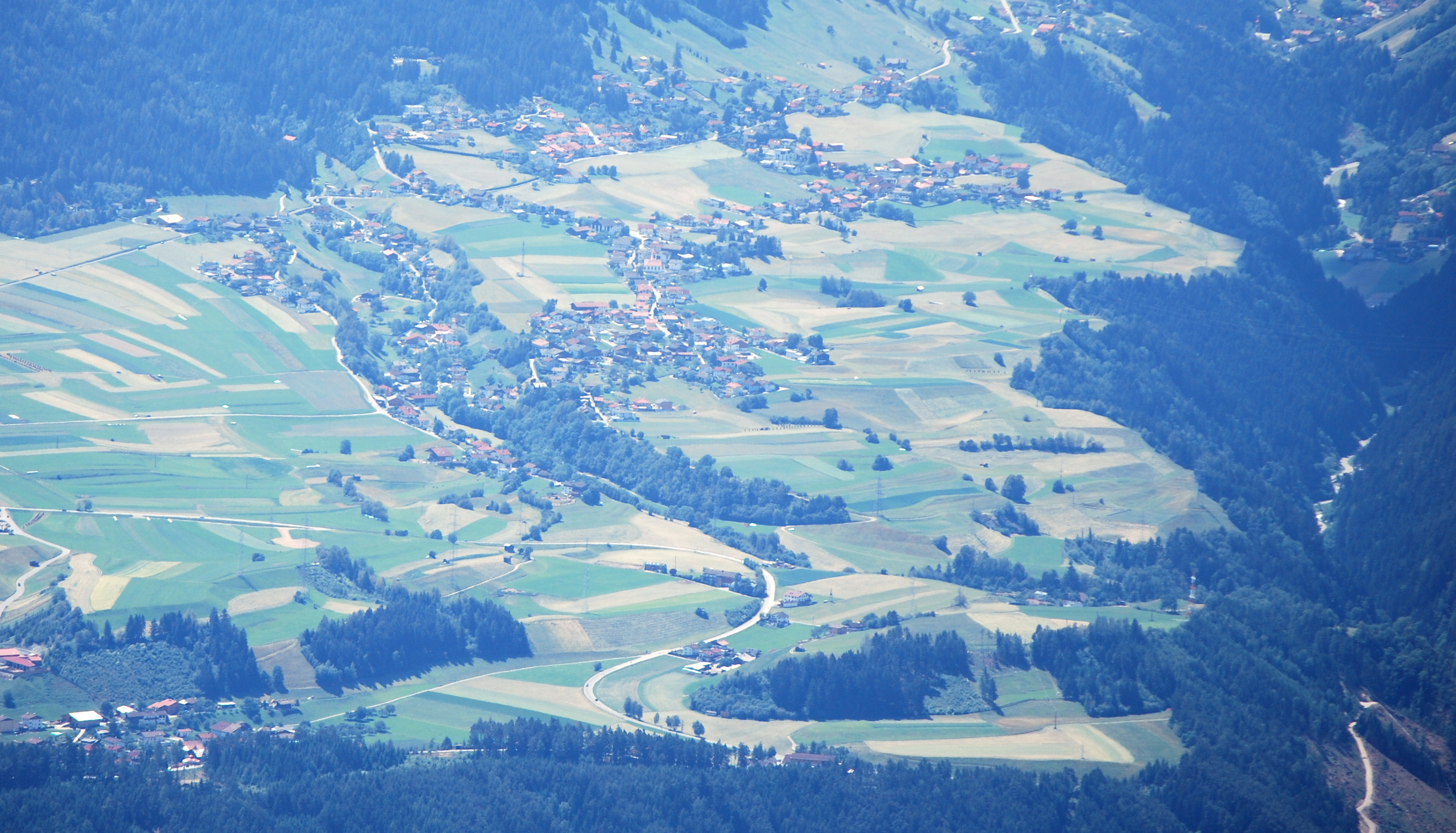

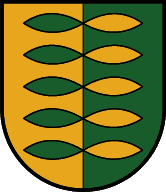
- Coat of arms

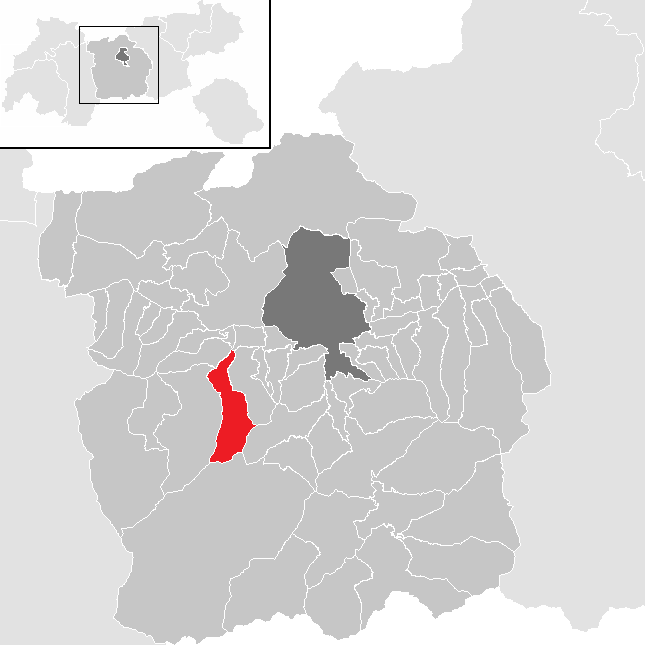
- Location in the district

- Location within Austria
- Coordinates: 47°13′37″N 11°15′02″E
- Country: Austria
- State: Tyrol
- District: Innsbruck Land

Government
  - Mayor: Anton Bucher (ÖVP)

Area
  - Total: 28.71 km^{2} (11.08 sq mi)
- Elevation: 945 m (3,100 ft)

Population (2021)
  - Total: 1,410
  - Density: 49.1/km^{2} (127/sq mi)
- Time zone: UTC+1 (CET)
  - Summer (DST): UTC+2 (CEST)
- Postal code: 6095
- Area code: 05234
- Vehicle registration: IL
- Website: www.grinzens.tirol.gv.at

Grinzens is a municipality in the Austrian state of Tyrol in the district of Innsbruck-Land. As of January 2015, its population is 1414. It lies southwest of the city of Innsbruck at an elevation of 945 m.

== Population ==
Historical population
Year	Pop.	±%
1869	447	—
1880	471	+5.4%
1890	459	−2.5%
1900	479	+4.4%
1910	397	−17.1%
1923	409	+3.0%
1934	472	+15.4%
1939	492	+4.2%
1951	522	+6.1%
1961	629	+20.5%
1971	882	+40.2%
1981	1,095	+24.1%
1991	1,260	+15.1%
2001	1,280	+1.6%
2011	1,307	+2.1%
2015	1,414	+8.2%

== Geography ==
Grinzens is located on a low mountain terrace southwest of Innsbruck, at the entrance to the Sellrain valley. The municipal area is bordered by the Melach and the Sendersbach. The elongated settlement extends mainly along a road that runs from Sellrain (Neder with Gertrein and Brandögg) to the western end of Axams (Moarhof and Bachl) and forks in the village area into the side, parallel to the Neder. Above the Anger one speaks of Obergrinzens, below, at the village church, of Untergrinzens.In addition to these streets, the village is characterized by the municipal building (with elementary school, kindergarten, crèche and pavilion, significantly expanded in 2013), the church and a multi-purpose building in the village center. The entire Senderstal valley, up to the Kalkkögel mountains, also belongs to the municipal area. About one-tenth of the municipality's area is suitable for year-round settlement, resulting in an effective population density of about 490 inhabitants per km^{2} of permanent settlement area.

== History ==
The village was first mentioned in a document in 1288 as Gratzinnes. The name of the village is ancient and its meaning is no longer clear. The original word was probably *Grinza or *Grazinna. In any case it can be placed in the same linguistic stratum as Fritzens, Götzens etc., which go back to the pre-Roman ending -inna. The records around 1400 of the Frauenchiemsee monastery name nine farms in Grinzens. The Sender valley leading south was also permanently settled around this time and still in 1352 - designated as "perch in Senders" - under the jurisdiction of the monastery of Wilten (Innsbruck).[3] In the 16th century these Schwaighöfe became alpine pastures. Until 1811 Grinzens was part of the neighboring municipality of Axams, before the Bavarian occupation elevated Grinzens to a politically independent municipality after the Tyrolean uprisings of 1809. Ecclesiastically, Grinzens only became a parish in its own right in 1956.

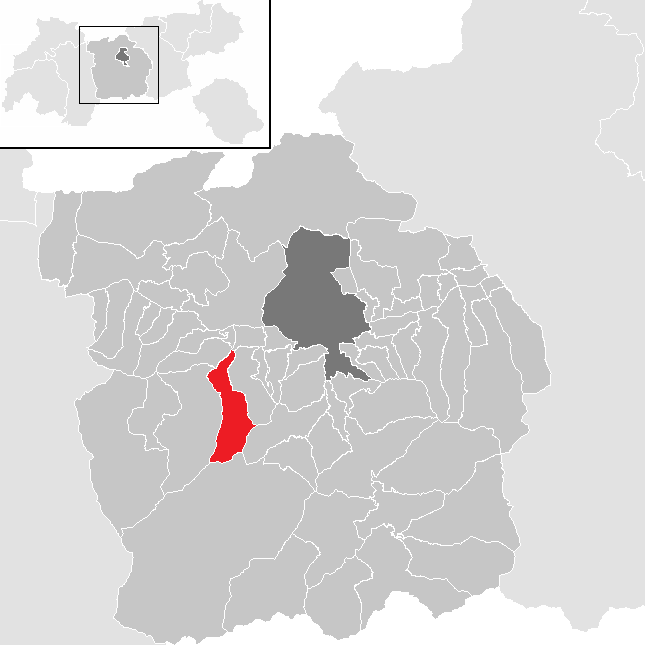
