= Ranggen =

- Municipality
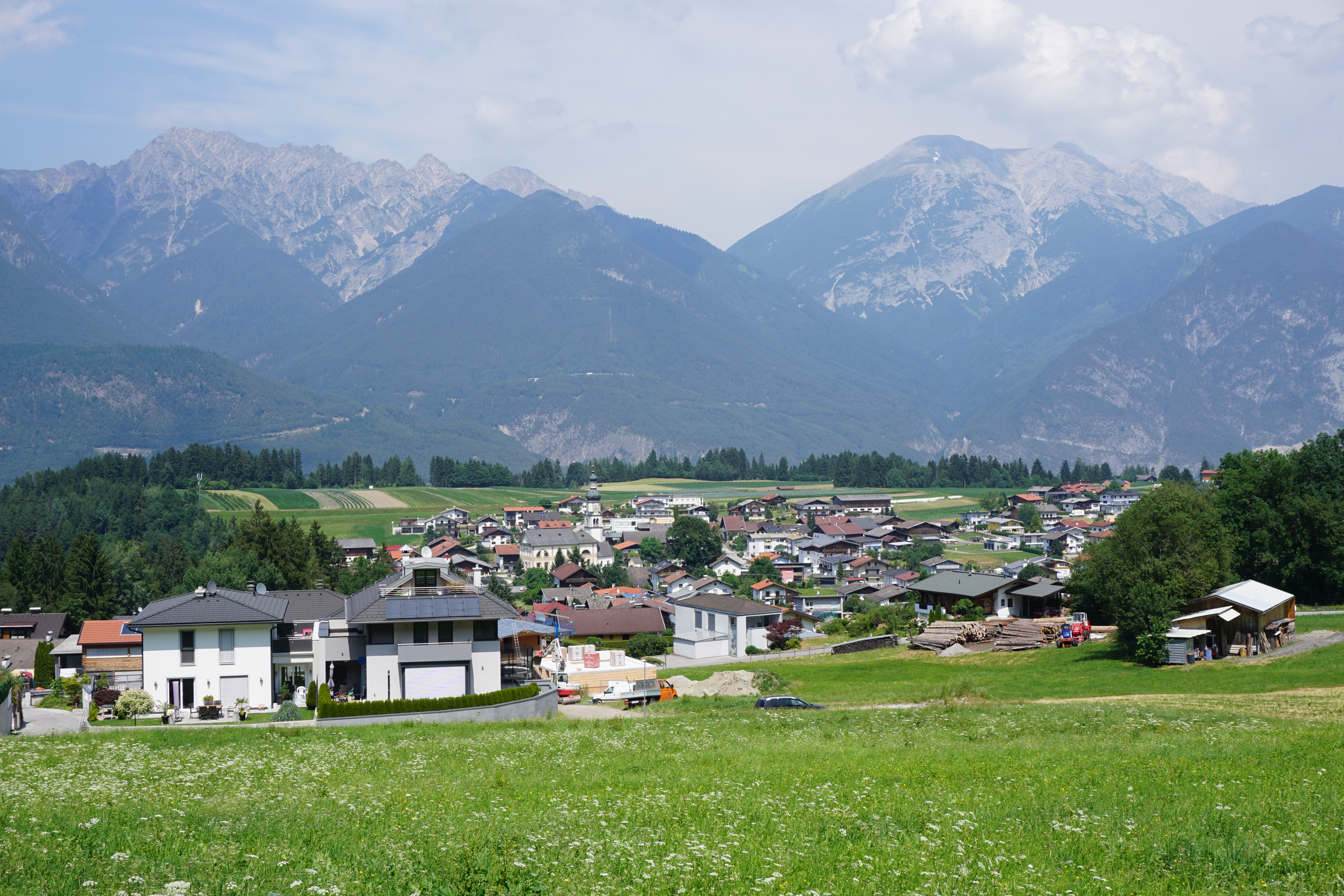
- View of Ranggen

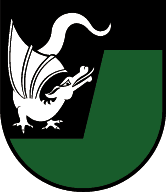
- Coat of arms

- Location within Austria
- Coordinates: 47°15′27″N 11°12′40″E
- Country: Austria
- State: Tyrol
- District: Innsbruck Land

Government
  - Mayor: Manfred Spiegl

Area
  - Total: 6.97 km^{2} (2.69 sq mi)
- Elevation: 826 m (2,710 ft)

Population (2021)
  - Total: 1,090
  - Density: 156/km^{2} (405/sq mi)
- Time zone: UTC+1 (CET)
  - Summer (DST): UTC+2 (CEST)
- Postal code: 6175
- Area code: 05232
- Vehicle registration: IL
- Website: www.ranggen.at

Ranggen is a municipality in the district of Innsbruck-Land in the Austrian state of Tyrol located 12 km west of Innsbruck. The location was mentioned as “Fergen” in 1482 for the first time. Ranggen has 17 parts.

== Population ==
Historical population
Year	Pop.	±%
1869	361	—
1880	347	−3.9%
1890	355	+2.3%
1900	346	−2.5%
1910	344	−0.6%
1923	348	+1.2%
1934	357	+2.6%
1939	342	−4.2%
1951	364	+6.4%
1961	400	+9.9%
1971	479	+19.8%
1981	569	+18.8%
1991	703	+23.6%
2001	839	+19.3%
2011	972	+15.9%
2018	1,072	+10.3%

== Geography ==
Ranggen is situated in a hollow of the Inn valley terrace, west of Innsbruck or in the eastern continuation of the Inzinger mountain. The actual Ranggen village area is divided into an outer, upper and lower village. In addition, there are alley-like condensations and hamlets that characterize the image of the cultural landscape. A special feature of the settlement geography is the Ferklehen manor (located on the valley floor near Unterperfuss), whose name is derived from "Fergen", which originally meant the right to look after the Inn ferry at Zirl. After the construction of the Inn bridge (1482), the Fergen right then referred to bridge maintenance. The Rettenbach flows through Ranggen. The highest mountain is the Rangger Köpfl with 1939 m.

== History ==
In the Middle Ages and early modern times, the Premonstratensian monastery of Wilten (Innsbruck) had significant possessions in Ranggen. It kept its own archive drawer for this under the designation "Lutzlranggen" (from Middle High German lützel, lützelig = small, little), which is linguistically depicted today in the local place of Itzlranggen.
