= Gries im Sellrain =

- Municipality
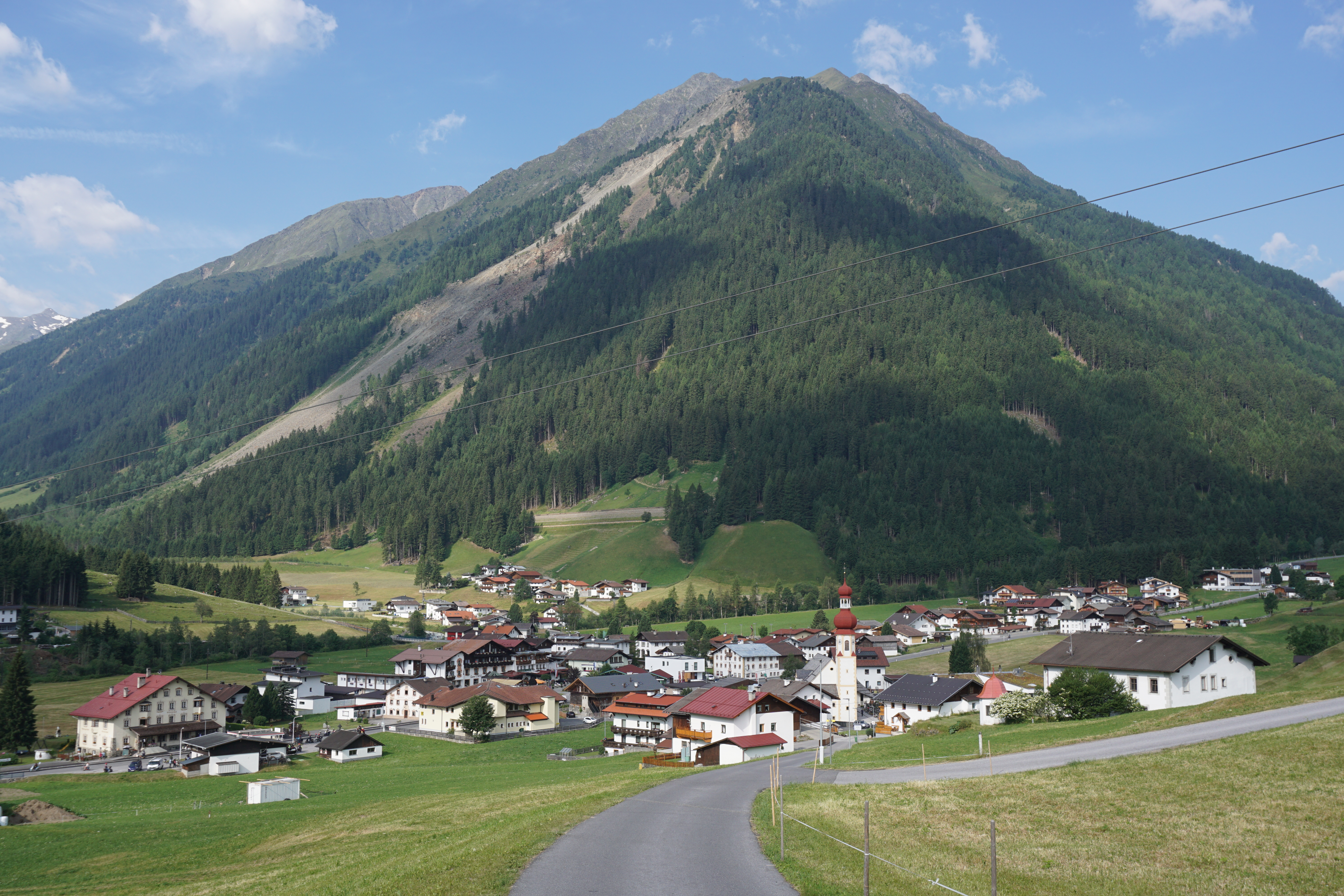

- Coat of arms

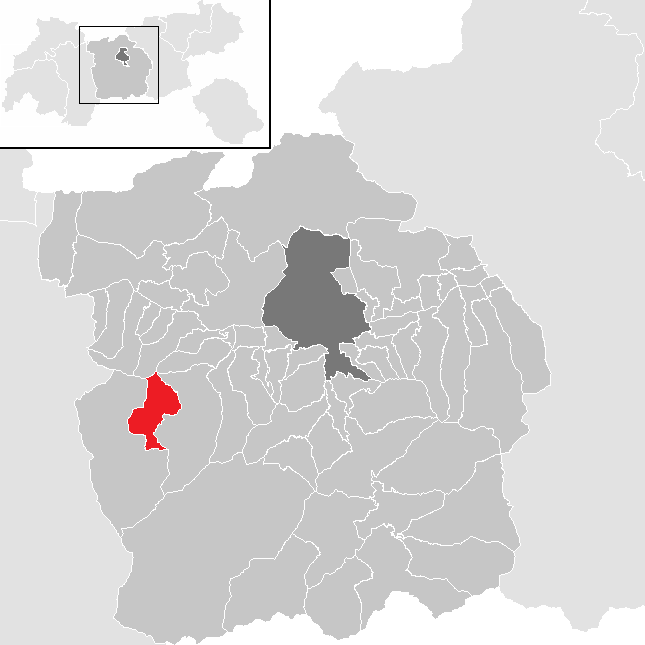
- Location in the district

- Location within Austria
- Coordinates: 47°11′44″N 11°09′23″E
- Country: Austria
- State: Tyrol
- District: Innsbruck Land

Government
  - Mayor: Martin Haselwanter

Area
  - Total: 22.62 km^{2} (8.73 sq mi)
- Elevation: 1,187 m (3,894 ft)

Population (2021)
  - Total: 619
  - Density: 27.4/km^{2} (70.9/sq mi)
- Time zone: UTC+1 (CET)
  - Summer (DST): UTC+2 (CEST)
- Postal code: 6182
- Area code: 05236
- Vehicle registration: IL
- Website: www.gries-im-sellrain.tirol.gv.at

Gries im Sellrain is a municipality in the Sellrain Valley in the western district of Innsbruck-Land. The village lies in the valley, and the Melach River flows through it.

== Population ==
Historical population
| Year | Pop. | ±% |
|---|---|---|
| 1869 | 433 | — |
| 1880 | 372 | −14.1% |
| 1890 | 366 | −1.6% |
| 1900 | 376 | +2.7% |
| 1910 | 368 | −2.1% |
| 1923 | 333 | −9.5% |
| 1934 | 363 | +9.0% |
| 1939 | 324 | −10.7% |
| 1951 | 376 | +16.0% |
| 1961 | 403 | +7.2% |
| 1971 | 468 | +16.1% |
| 1981 | 505 | +7.9% |
| 1991 | 560 | +10.9% |
| 2001 | 570 | +1.8% |
| 2011 | 583 | +2.3% |
| 2015 | 599 | +2.7% |

== Geography ==
Gries is situated in the middle Sellrain valley, a side valley of the Inn valley. From Gries branches off the Lüsens valley, the rear part of which belongs to the municipality of St. Sigmund im Sellrain. In addition, the Zirmbach, which comes from St. Sigmund, flows into the Melach in the village center of Gries.

The municipality also includes numerous hamlets on the slopes (Obermarendebach, ...) and the flood-prone valley floor between Muren (Obergries) and Untermarendebach.

== History ==
The name Gries was first mentioned in 1410 as a field name at the Gries. The name comes from griez - the Middle High German equivalent of Rhaeto-Romanic Gleirsch - and means 'rubble'. This refers to the coarse sand deposited at the confluence of the Melach and Zirmbach rivers. According to a tax description from 1629, Axams consists of three toeholds. The "Hintere Zehent Sellraintal" is also called "auf dem Gries". Ecclesiastically, Gries also belongs to the original parish of Axams. In the years 1733 to 1734 the church of St. Martin was built, but Gries only became an independent parish in 1891. From 1951 to 153 the elementary school was built and in 1979/80 the municipal office. A landslide in 2003 necessitated the construction of a dam to protect the Reichenhöfe settlement.
