= Flaurling =

- Municipality
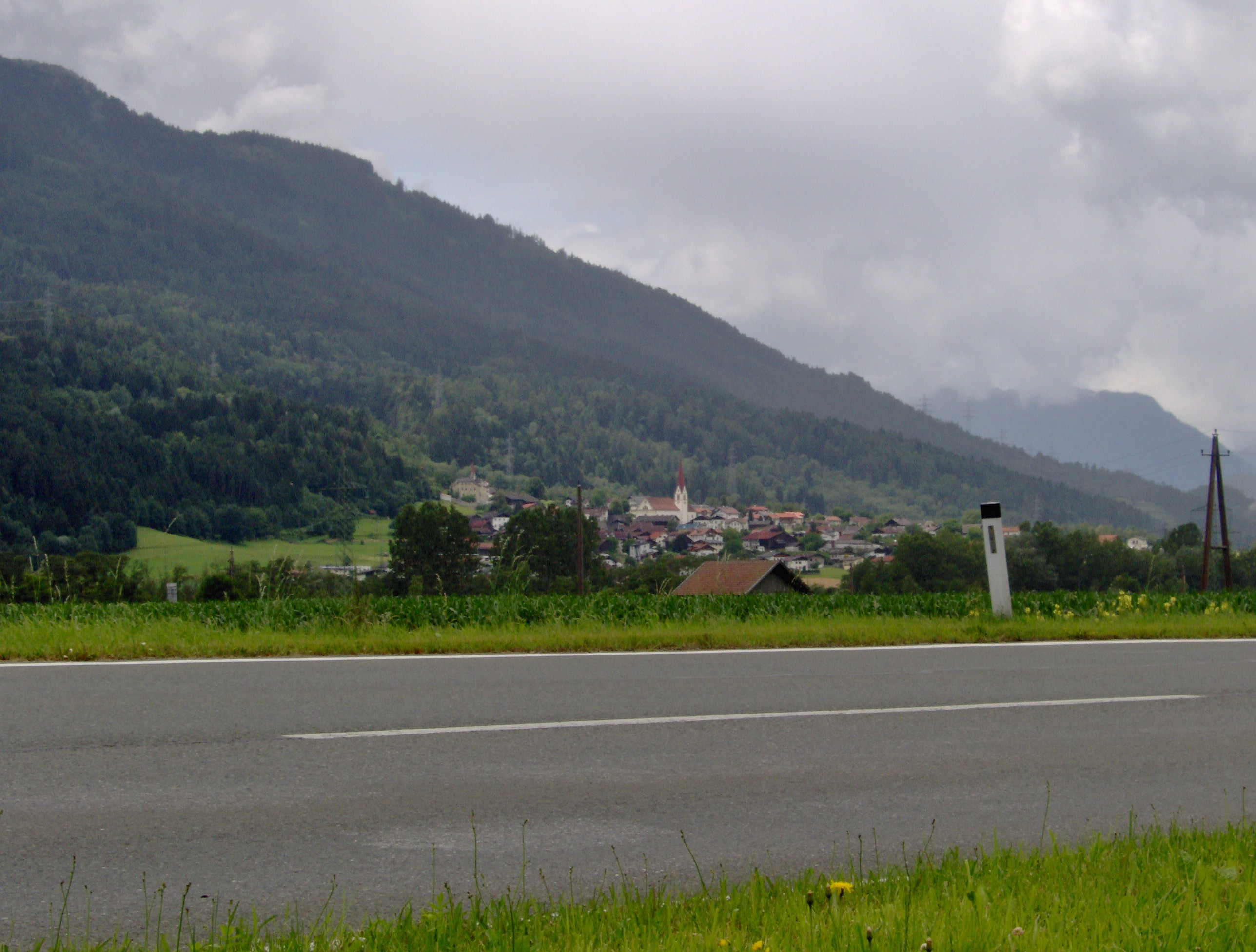

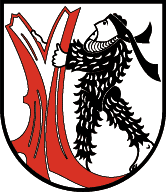
- Coat of arms

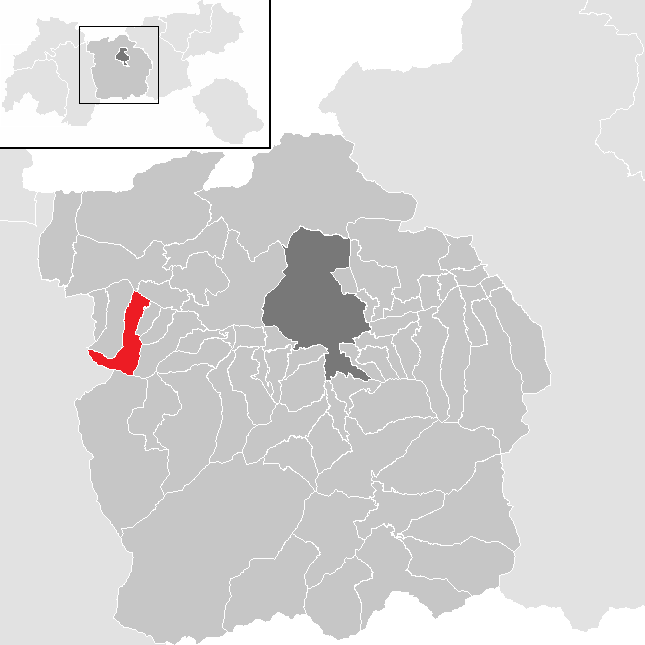
- Location in the district

- Location within Austria
- Coordinates: 47°17′32″N 11°07′23″E
- Country: Austria
- State: Tyrol
- District: Innsbruck Land

Government
  - Mayor: Brigitte Praxmarer (SPÖ)

Area
  - Total: 19.64 km^{2} (7.58 sq mi)
- Elevation: 675 m (2,215 ft)

Population (2021)
  - Total: 1,309
  - Density: 66.65/km^{2} (172.6/sq mi)
- Time zone: UTC+1 (CET)
  - Summer (DST): UTC+2 (CEST)
- Postal code: 6403
- Area code: 05262
- Vehicle registration: IL
- Website: www.flaurling.tirol.gv.at

Flaurling is a municipality in the district Innsbruck country in Tyrol (Austria). It lies in the Inn valley between Innsbruck and Telfs south of the Inn River.

The municipality consists of the areas: Flaurling village, Flaurling station with a commercial district and Flaurlingberg at the western foothills of a low mountain range terrace. It was mentioned documentarily for the first time as "Flurininga" in the year 763.

== Population ==
Historical population
Year	Pop.	±%
1869	556	—
1880	542	−2.5%
1890	517	−4.6%
1900	441	−14.7%
1910	493	+11.8%
1923	531	+7.7%
1934	583	+9.8%
1939	578	−0.9%
1951	701	+21.3%
1961	712	+1.6%
1971	884	+24.2%
1981	908	+2.7%
1991	976	+7.5%
2001	1,106	+13.3%
2011	1,224	+10.7%
2015	1,285	+5.0%

== Twin towns ==
- Andocs, Hungary
