= Hatting, Tyrol =

Hatting
- Municipality
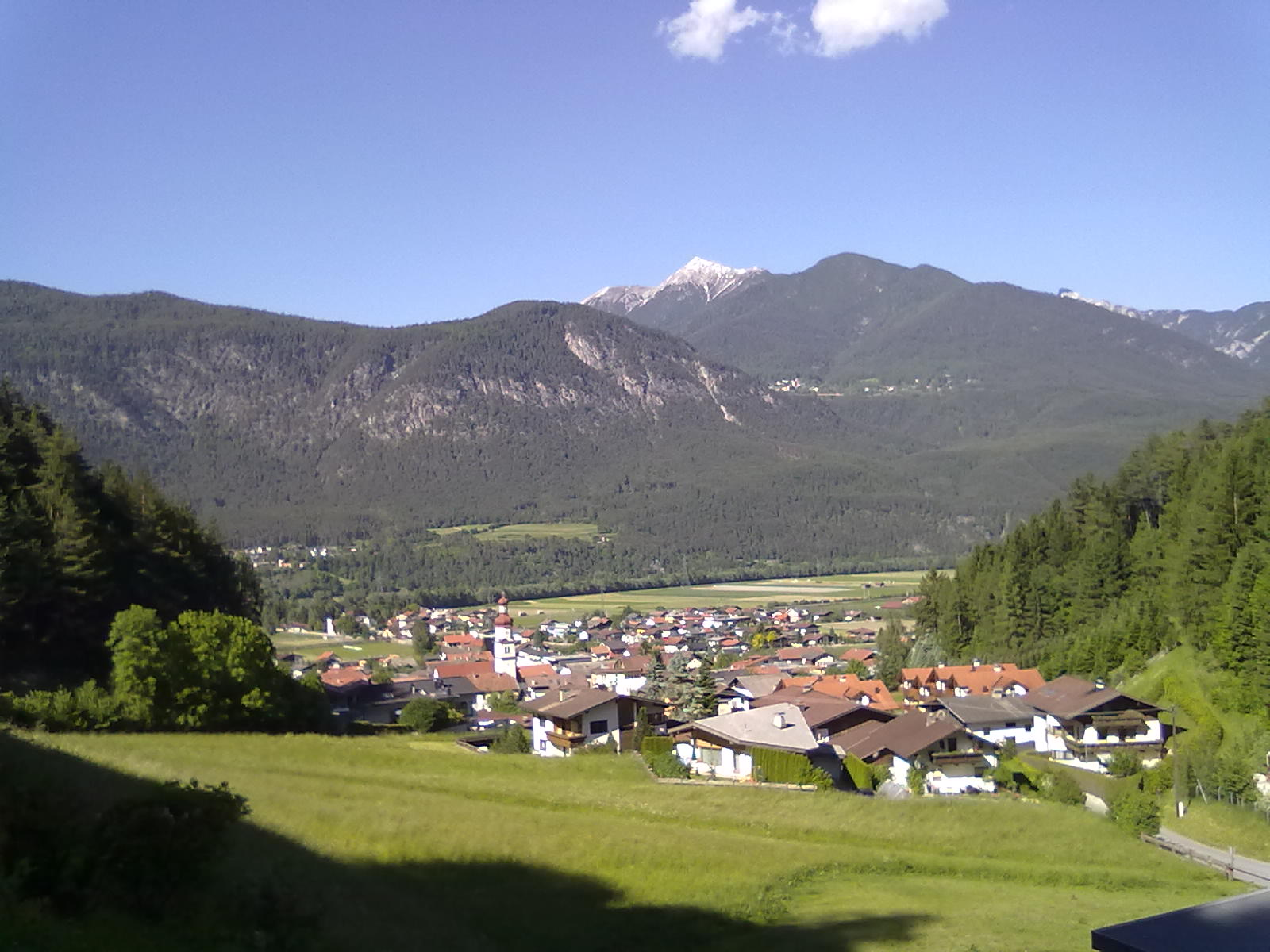
- View of Hatting

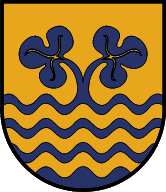
- Coat of arms

- Location within Austria
- Coordinates: 47°16′40″N 11°10′06″E
- Country: Austria
- State: Tyrol
- District: Innsbruck Land

Government
  - Mayor: Friedrich Schöpf (ÖVP)

Area
  - Total: 7.07 km^{2} (2.73 sq mi)
- Elevation: 616 m (2,021 ft)

Population (2021)
  - Total: 1,469
  - Density: 208/km^{2} (538/sq mi)
- Time zone: UTC+1 (CET)
  - Summer (DST): UTC+2 (CEST)
- Postal code: 6402
- Area code: 05238
- Vehicle registration: IL
- Website: www.hatting.at

Hatting is a municipality in the district Innsbruck-Land and is located 18 km west of the city of Innsbruck. The village was mentioned around 11th century for the first time.

== Population ==
Historical population
Year	Pop.	±%
1869	302	—
1880	328	+8.6%
1890	301	−8.2%
1900	286	−5.0%
1910	316	+10.5%
1923	384	+21.5%
1934	470	+22.4%
1939	499	+6.2%
1951	579	+16.0%
1961	565	−2.4%
1971	637	+12.7%
1981	728	+14.3%
1991	809	+11.1%
2001	1,012	+25.1%
2011	1,230	+21.5%
