= Oberperfuss =

- Municipality
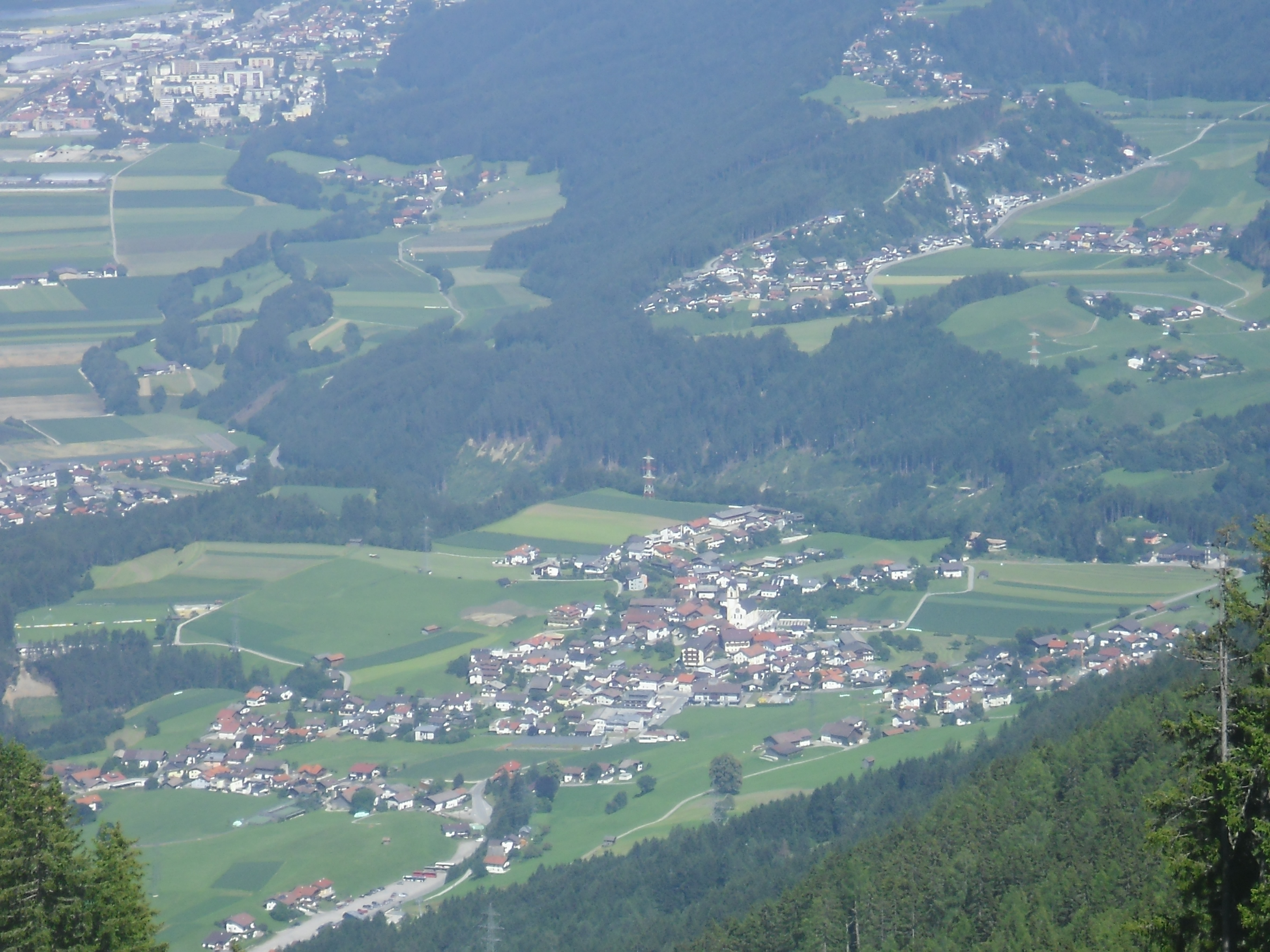
- Oberperfuss

- Coat of arms

- Location within Austria
- Coordinates: 47°15′00″N 11°15′00″E
- Country: Austria
- State: Tyrol
- District: Innsbruck Land

Government
  - Mayor: Johanna Obojes-Rubatscher (Oberperfuss Aktiv)

Area
  - Total: 15.29 km^{2} (5.90 sq mi)
- Elevation: 812 m (2,664 ft)

Population (2021)
  - Total: 3,082
  - Density: 201.6/km^{2} (522.1/sq mi)
- Time zone: UTC+1 (CET)
  - Summer (DST): UTC+2 (CEST)
- Postal code: 6173
- Area code: 05232
- Vehicle registration: IL
- Website: www.gemeinde-oberperfuss.at

Oberperfuss is a municipality in the district of Innsbruck-Land in the Austrian state of Tyrol located about 15 km (9.3 mi) west of Innsbruck at the entrance of the Sellrain Valley. It was mentioned in documents around 1083 for the first time.

== Population ==
Historical population
Year	Pop.	±%
1869	909	—
1880	817	−10.1%
1890	804	−1.6%
1900	815	+1.4%
1910	842	+3.3%
1923	898	+6.7%
1934	999	+11.2%
1939	1,017	+1.8%
1951	1,217	+19.7%
1961	1,307	+7.4%
1971	1,559	+19.3%
1981	1,766	+13.3%
1991	2,187	+23.8%
2001	2,712	+24.0%
2011	2,815	+3.8%

== Geography ==
Oberperfuss is located in the Inn Valley about 15 km west of Innsbruck, on a low mountain terrace opposite Grinzens, at the entrance to the Sellrain Valley.

== History ==
The name Oberperfuss was first mentioned as Oberenperues in a 1083 deed, when Norbert, Bishop of Chur, donated land to the Bavarian Habach convent. According to the Inn valley tax book of 1312, about 300 inhabitants from the farming class lived in Oberperfuss at that time, plus craftsmen and wage laborers. Around the year 1600 there were probably already about 800 inhabitants. According to the last census in 2001, 2712 people lived in the community. The majority of the inhabitants commute, especially to the provincial capital Innsbruck.
