= Kolsass =

- Municipality
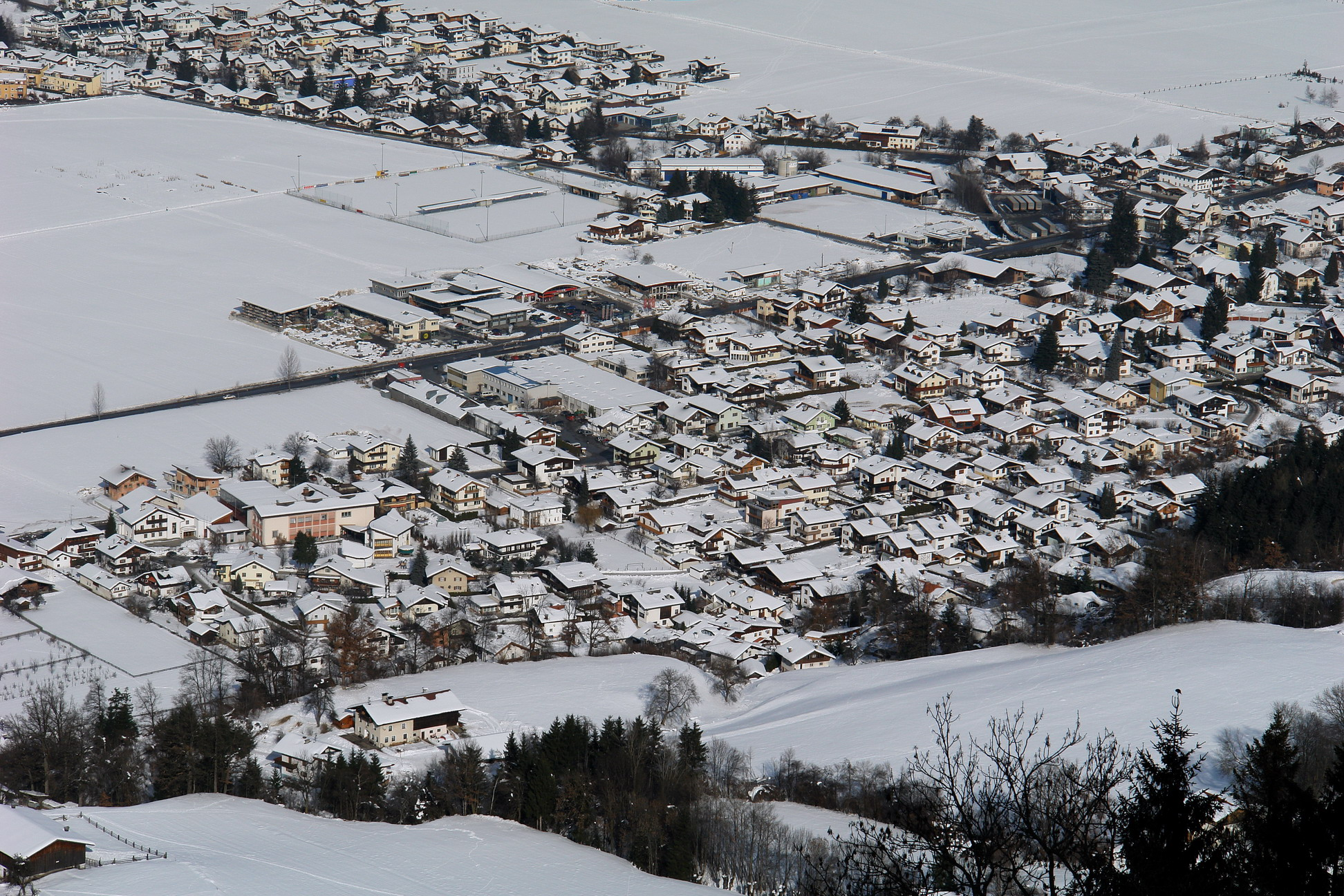

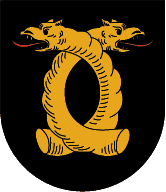
- Coat of arms

- Location within Austria
- Coordinates: 47°18′01″N 11°37′51″E
- Country: Austria
- State: Tyrol
- District: Innsbruck Land

Government
  - Mayor: Hansjörg Gartlacher

Area
  - Total: 3.34 km^{2} (1.29 sq mi)
- Elevation: 553 m (1,814 ft)

Population (2021)
  - Total: 1,667
  - Density: 499/km^{2} (1,290/sq mi)
- Time zone: UTC+1 (CET)
  - Summer (DST): UTC+2 (CEST)
- Postal code: 6114
- Area code: 05224
- Vehicle registration: IL
- Website: www.kolsass.gv.at

Kolsass is a municipality in the district Innsbruck-Land in the Austrian state of Tyrol located about 17 km east of Innsbruck. The location was first mentioned as „Quolesazz or Cholsasz" in 1050.

== Population ==
Historical population
Year	Pop.	±%
1869	320	—
1880	322	+0.6%
1890	357	+10.9%
1900	369	+3.4%
1910	374	+1.4%
1923	417	+11.5%
1934	411	−1.4%
1939	411	+0.0%
1951	481	+17.0%
1961	641	+33.3%
1971	947	+47.7%
1981	1,143	+20.7%
1991	1,214	+6.2%
2001	1,411	+16.2%
2011	1,506	+6.7%

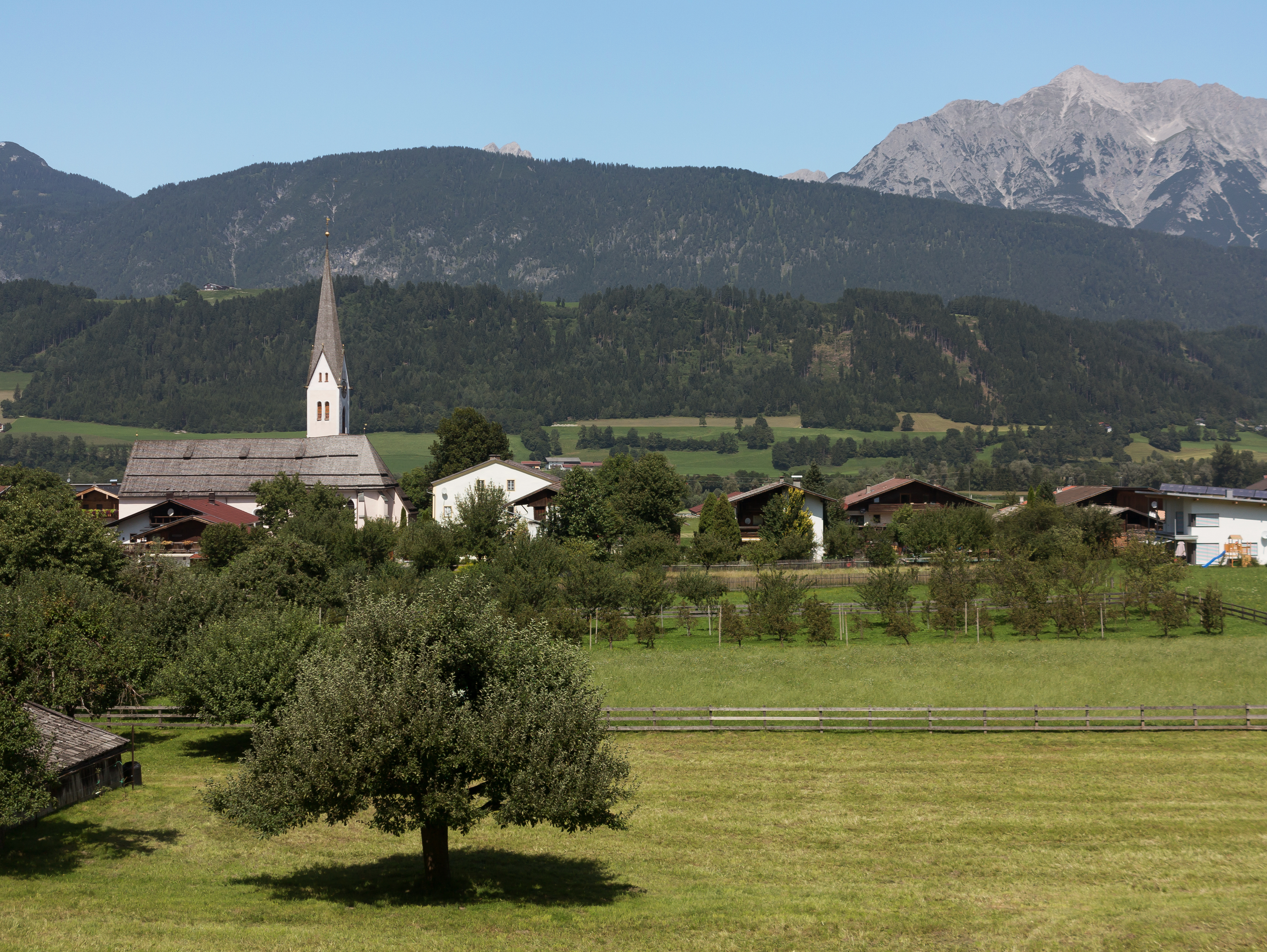
Kolsass, church: die Katholische Pfarrkirche Mariä Heimsuchung
