= Sankt Sigmund im Sellrain =

St. Sigmund im Sellrain
- Municipality
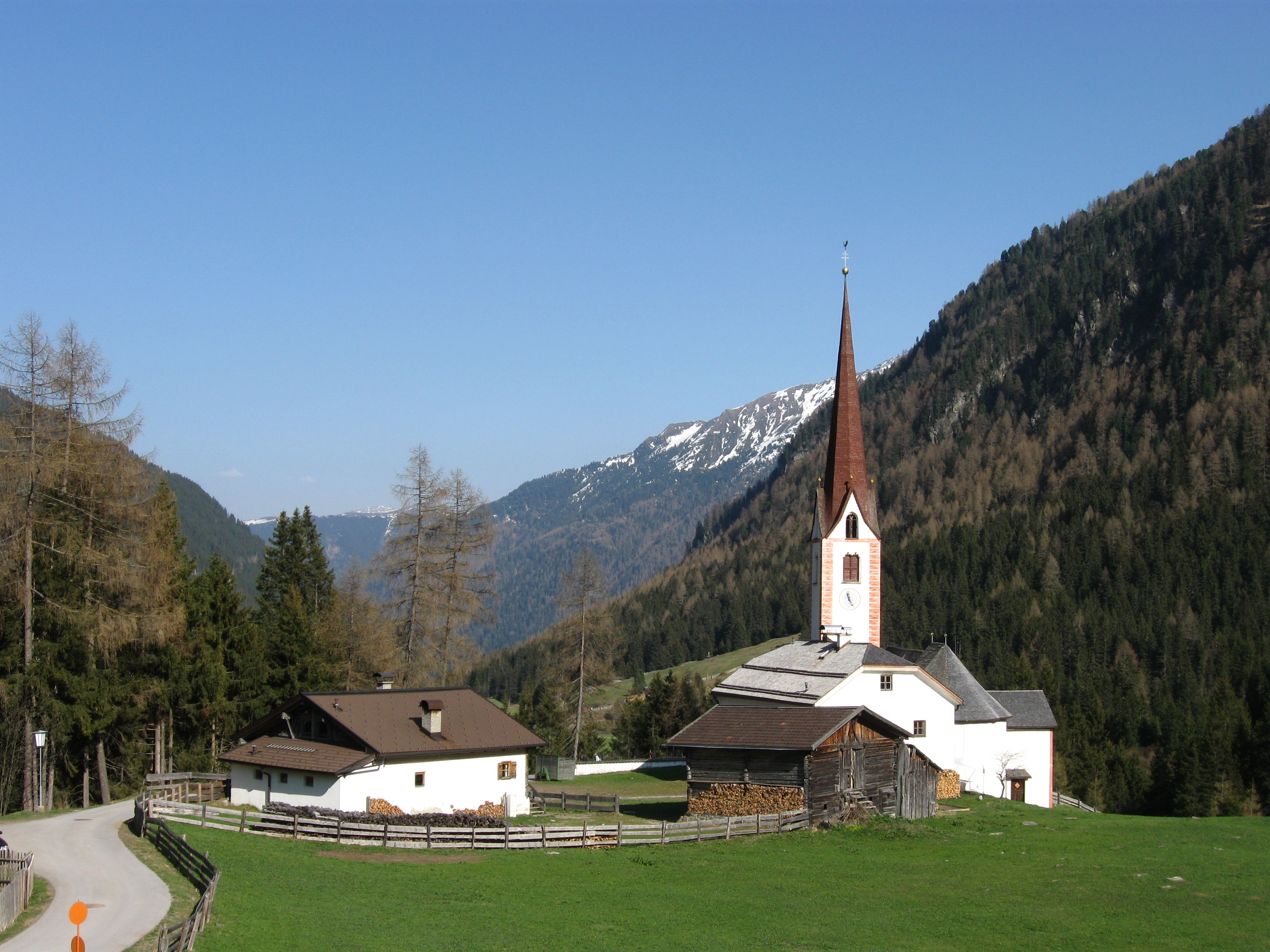
- Sankt Sigmund im Sellrain catholic church

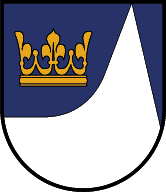
- Coat of arms

- Location within Austria
- Coordinates: 47°12′00″N 11°06′00″E
- Country: Austria
- State: Tyrol
- District: Innsbruck Land

Government
  - Mayor: Anton Schiffmann (ÖVP)

Area
  - Total: 102.3 km^{2} (39.5 sq mi)
- Elevation: 1,513 m (4,964 ft)

Population (2020)
  - Total: 175
  - Density: 1.71/km^{2} (4.43/sq mi)
- Time zone: UTC+1 (CET)
  - Summer (DST): UTC+2 (CEST)
- Postal code: 6182
- Area code: 5236
- Vehicle registration: IL
- Website: www.stsigmund.tirol.gv.at

Sankt Sigmund im Sellrain is a municipality in western Austria, in the district of Innsbruck-Land in the state of Tyrol located 23.3 kilometres (14.5 mi) southeast of Innsbruck, in the deepest part of the Sellrain Valley. It has a large area and the highest elevation. The main source of income is winter tourism.

== Population ==
Historical population
Year	Pop.	±%
1869	163	—
1880	156	−4.3%
1890	161	+3.2%
1900	168	+4.3%
1910	158	−6.0%
1923	148	−6.3%
1934	157	+6.1%
1939	163	+3.8%
1951	145	−11.0%
1961	146	+0.7%
1971	142	−2.7%
1981	162	+14.1%
1991	160	−1.2%
2001	204	+27.5%
2011	173	−15.2%
