= Telfs =

- Municipality
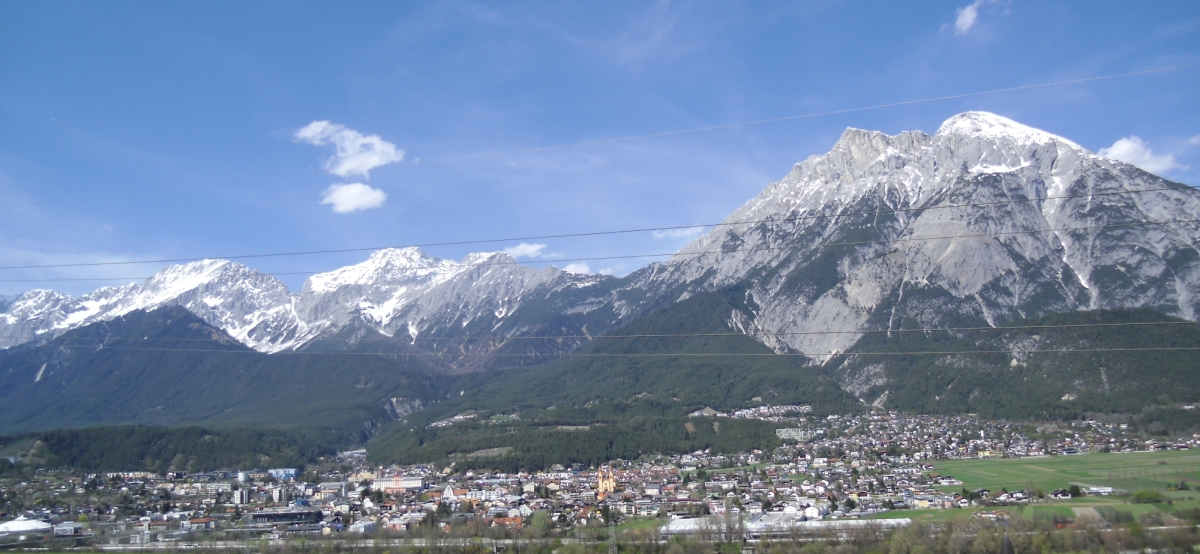
- Telfs seen from the Mieming Range

- Flag Coat of arms

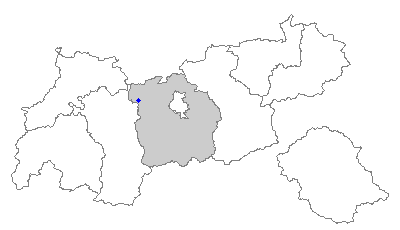
- Location of Telfs in Tyrol

- Location within Austria
- Coordinates: 47°17′00″N 11°04′00″E
- Country: Austria
- State: Tyrol
- District: Innsbruck Land

Government
  - Mayor: Christian Härting (Liste "Wir für Telfs")

Area
  - Total: 45.48 km^{2} (17.56 sq mi)
- Elevation: 634 m (2,080 ft)

Population (2020)
  - Total: 16,046
  - Density: 352.8/km^{2} (913.8/sq mi)
- Time zone: UTC+1 (CET)
  - Summer (DST): UTC+2 (CEST)
- Postal code: 6410, 6412 (Postfiliale Telfs-St. Georgen / nicht adressierbar)
- Area code: 05262
- Vehicle registration: IL
- Website: https://www.telfs.at/

Telfs is a market town in the district of Innsbruck-Land in the Austrian state of Tyrol, 27 kilometres (17 miles) west of Innsbruck. It is the third largest municipality in Tyrol. Telfs received its status in 1908 and maintains its own district court.

== Population ==
Historical population
Year	Pop.	±%
1869	2,197	—
1880	2,261	+2.9%
1890	2,693	+19.1%
1900	2,715	+0.8%
1910	3,151	+16.1%
1923	2,978	−5.5%
1934	3,681	+23.6%
1939	3,849	+4.6%
1951	4,786	+24.3%
1961	5,438	+13.6%
1971	6,589	+21.2%
1981	7,743	+17.5%
1991	10,179	+31.5%
2001	12,833	+26.1%
2011	14,626	+14.0%
2015	15,224	+4.1%

Largest groups of foreign residents
Nationality	Population (2026)
Turkey	1,025
Germany	626
Syria	261
Bosnia and Herzegovina	210
Hungary	167
Afghanistan	131
Italy	114
Serbia	90
Croatia	80
Romania	84
Bulgaria	55
Ukraine	51
Slovakia	39
Poland	29
Russian Federation	28
Slovenia	20
Iraq	20
Kosovo	18
Czech Republic	13
Iran	10
North Macedonia	3

== Gallery ==
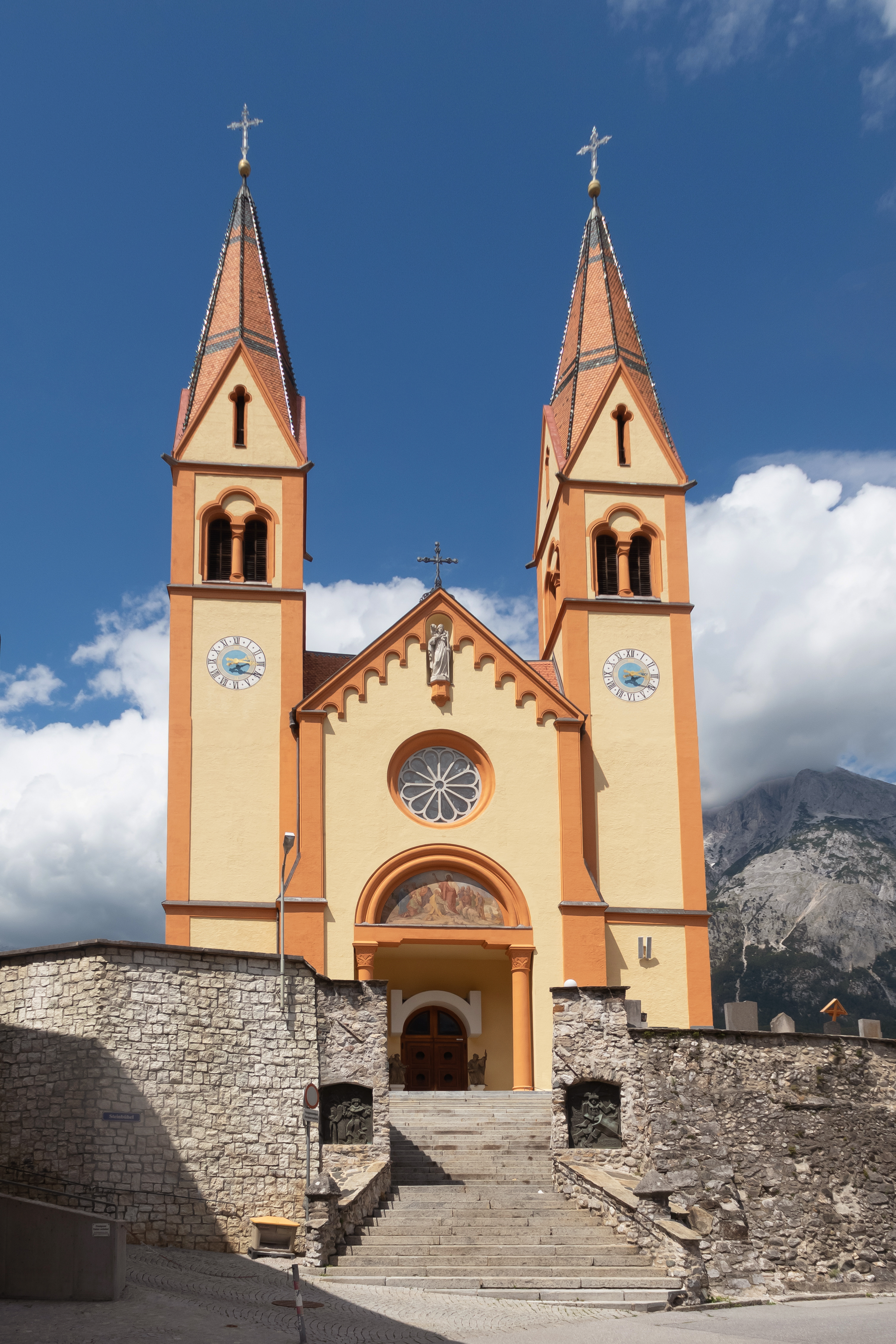
Church in Telfs

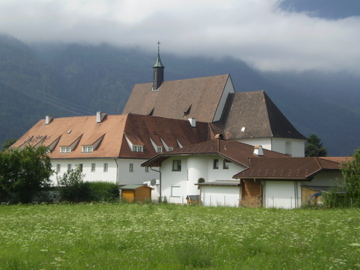
Franciscanian monastery at Telfs.

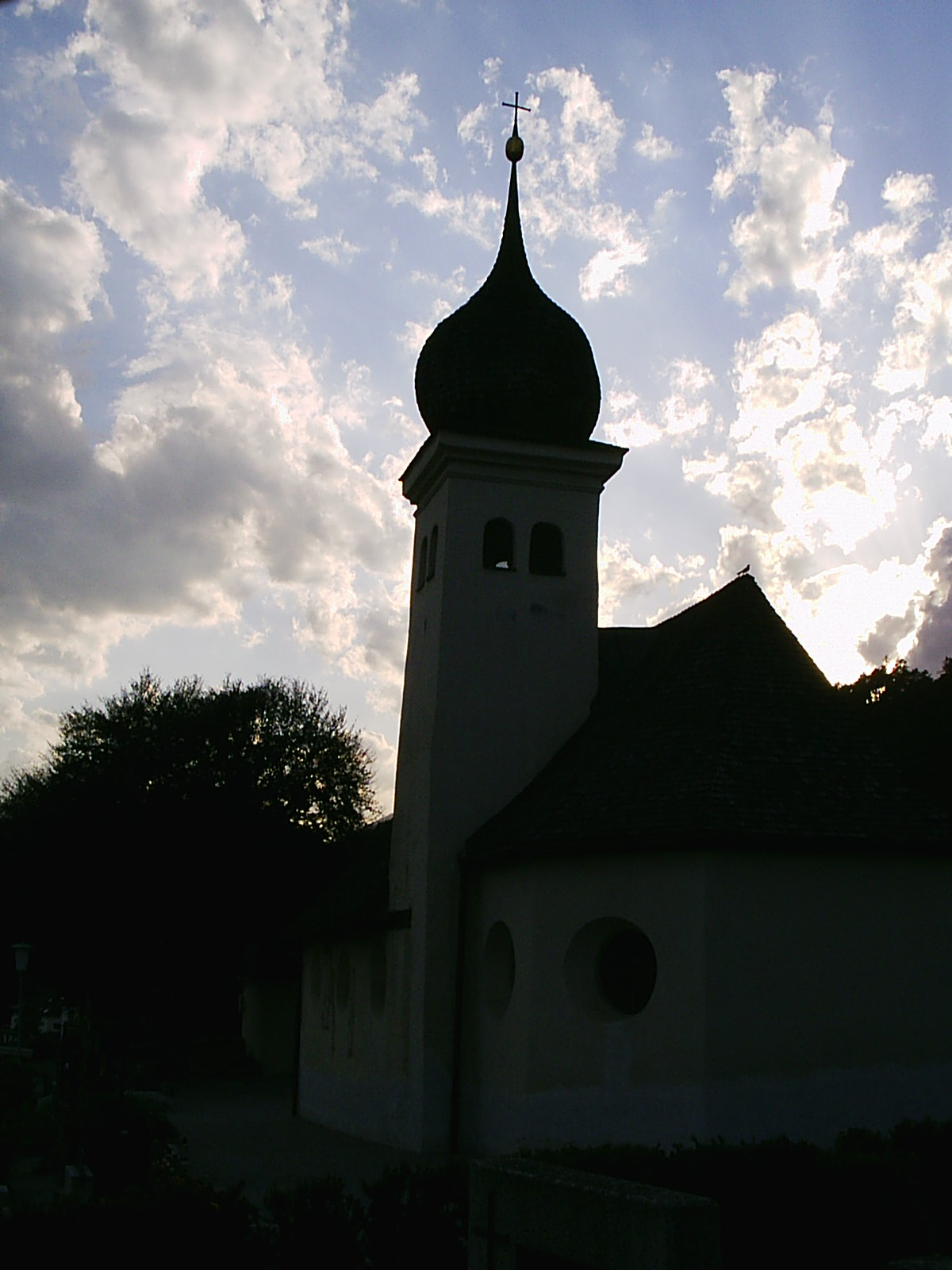
Old Church at Telfs.

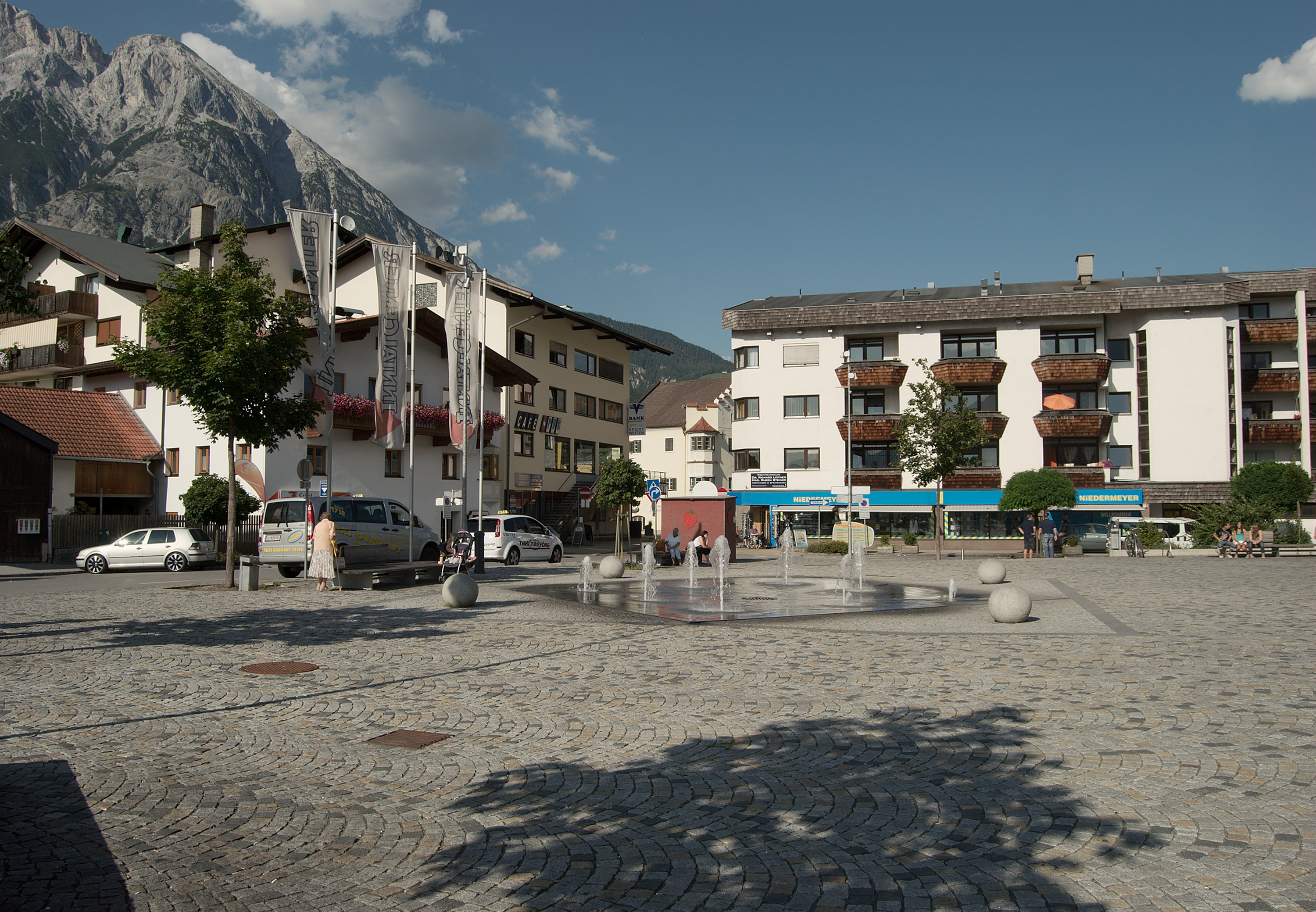
A square in Telfs.

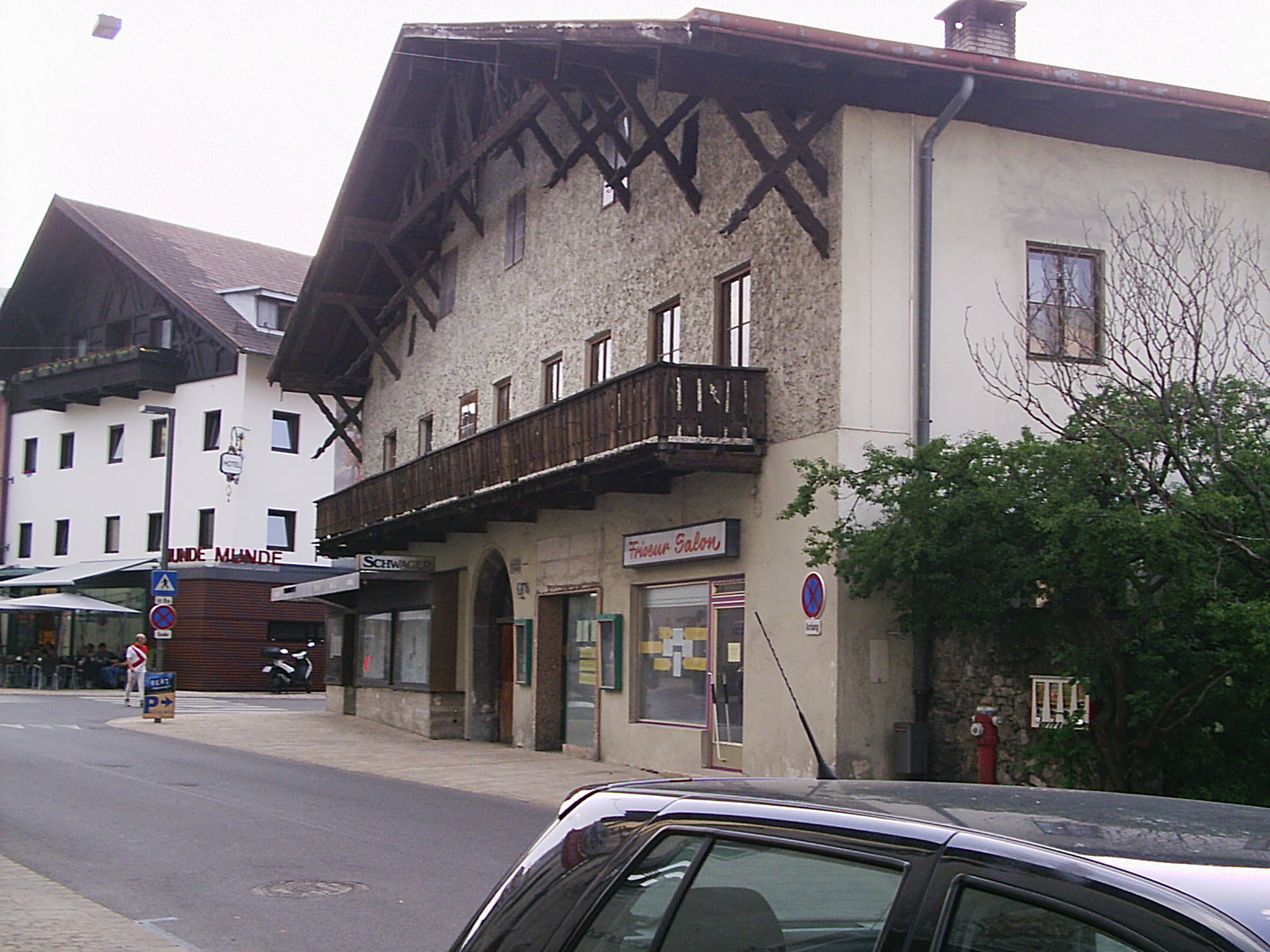
800-year-old house in Telfs.

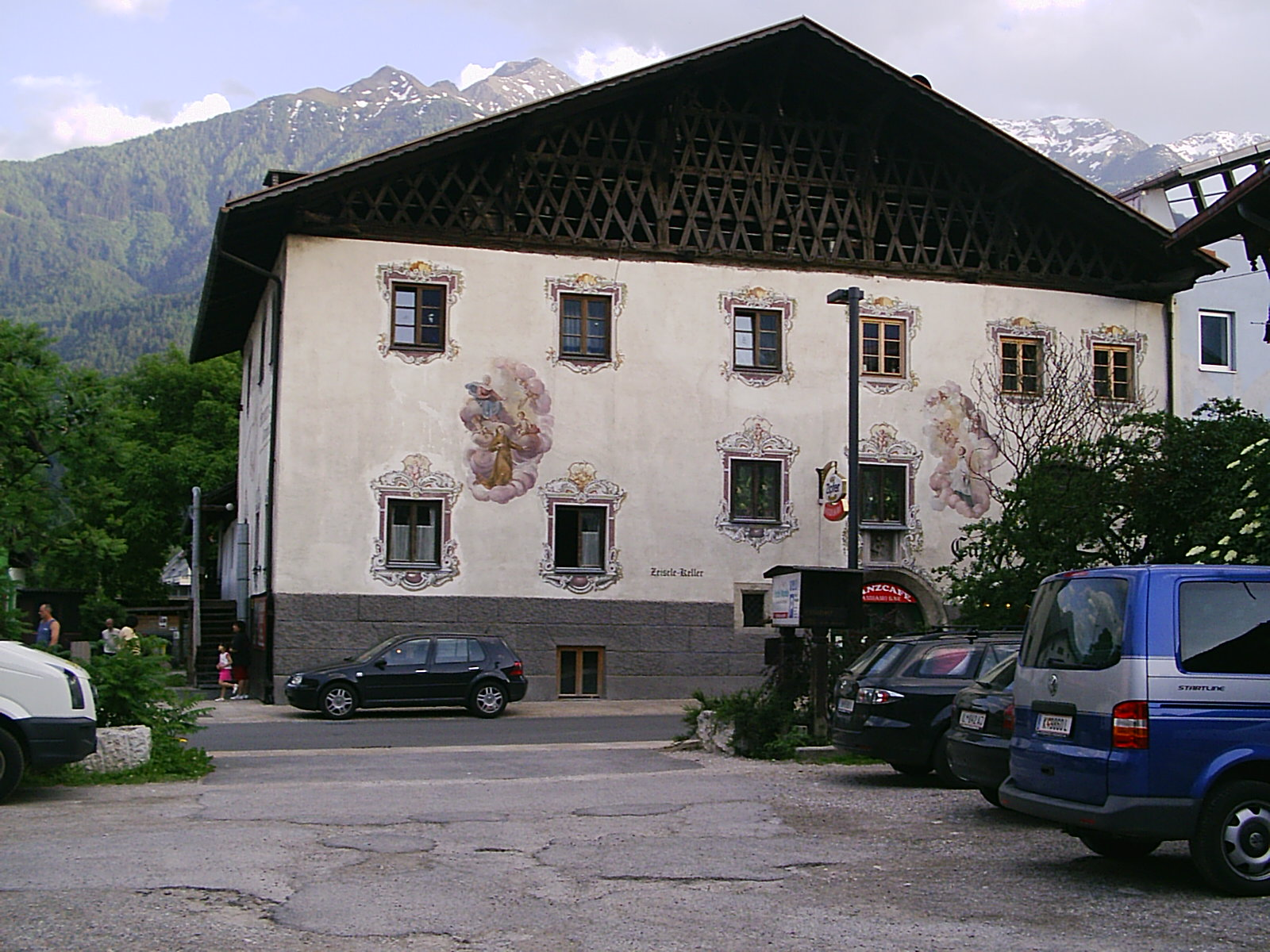
Old House in Telfs.

== See also ==
- 2015 Bilderberg Conference
