= Jörg Streli =

Austrian architect (1940–2019)

- Jorg Streli, c. 2015
- Born: 26 March 1940; Innsbruck, Austria
- Died: 13 February 2019 (aged 78); Innsbruck, Austria
- Education: Technische Hochschule Wien
- Occupations: Architect; Academic teacher
- Organizations: Heinz & Mathoi & Streli; Innsbruck University

Jörg Streli (26 March 1940 – 13 February 2019) was an Austrian architect and academic teacher at the Innsbruck University. With two colleagues, as the firm Heinz & Mathoi & Streli, he built private homes in the alpine landscape of Tyrol, schools, offices and public buildings, among others. He was also president of the architecture section of the Ingenieur- und Architektenkammer für Tirol und Vorarlberg.

== Life and career ==
Streli was born in Innsbruck on 26 March 1940. He studied architecture at the Technische Hochschule Wien from 1958 to 1964. After several years of practice, he became assistant at the Innsbruck University in 1969, a post he held until 1976. He lectured at the university from 1992 to 1997.

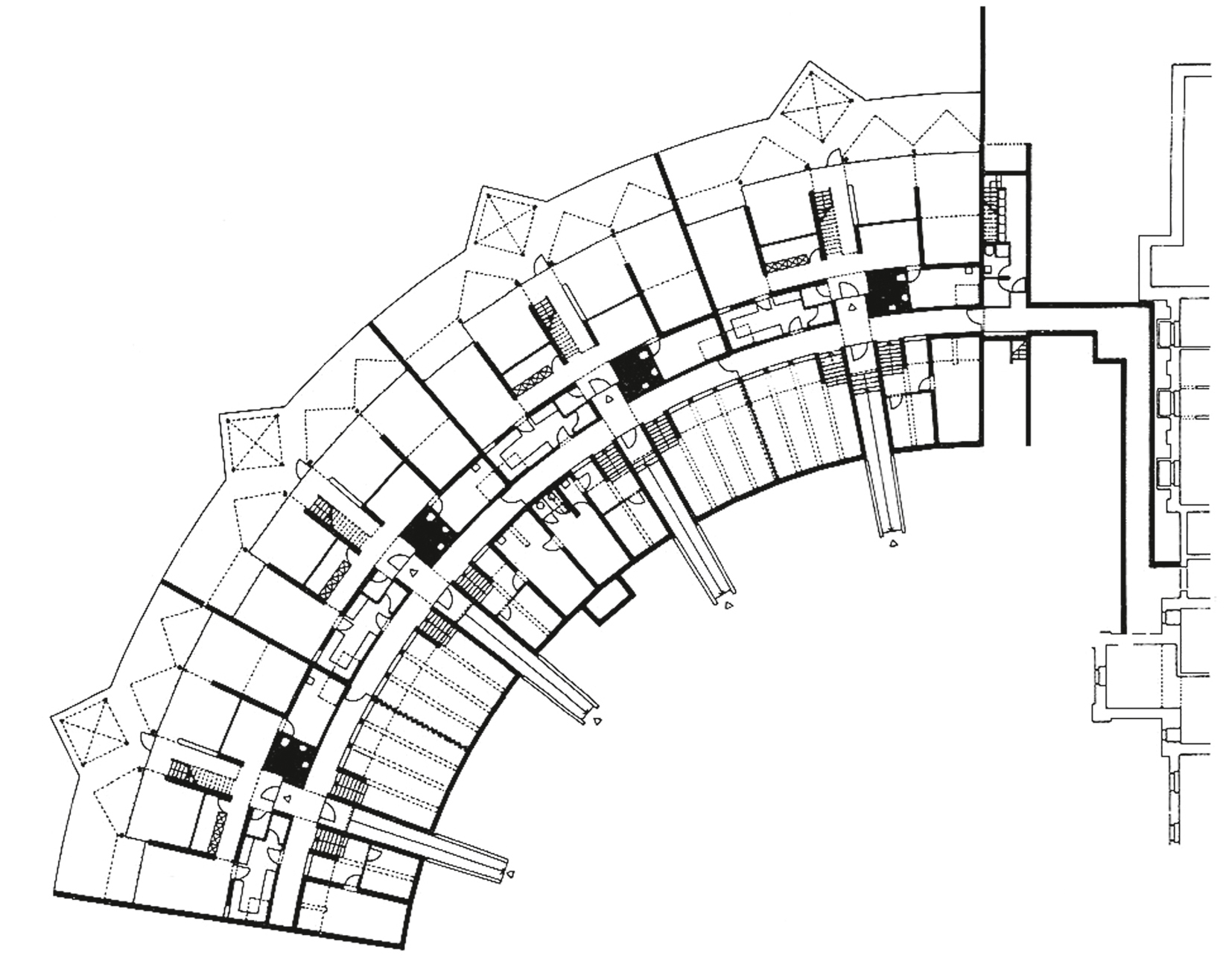
Floor plan for Landesjugendheim in Jagdberg, Schlins

From 1973, Streli collaborated with two colleagues, Karl Heinz and Dieter Mathoi, as the firm Heinz & Mathoi & Streli. While they created many buildings jointly, each architect also pursued his own projects. Together, they built a chapel in 1982, the Sankt-Margarethen-Kapelle in Innerberg, which rises like a tower on a circular floor. They built a home for homeless children as a Gruppenwohnheim (group home) with four separate units, completed in Jagdberg, Vorarlberg, in 1984. Streli focused on one-family homes, with respect for the owners' wishes and the natural surroundings. Inspired by models such as Clemens Holzmeister, Josef Lackner, Lois Welzenbacher, and Frank Lloyd Wright, he found his own style. He departed from his love of nature and of traditional building in rural landscape, with wood as a preferred material, but changed toward urban environments. He renovated the interior of the old parish church in Hötting in 1989, and built a new parish hall there in 1994.

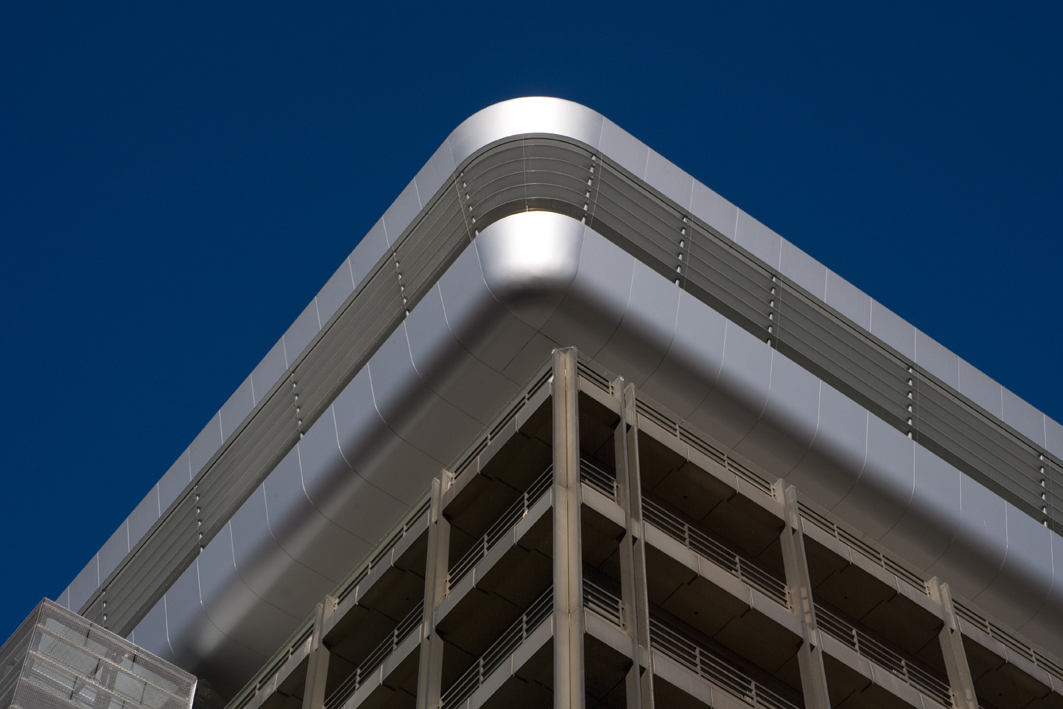
Extension of the University Hospital Innsbruck, completed 2008

The joint extension of the University Hospital in Innsbruck, created by adding a technical and a clinical floor for gynecology and neurology on top, built from 2006 to 2008, was nominated for the award of the Fundació Mies van der Rohe in 2009. In 2008, Springer published a monograph of their works, both group and individual projects, titled Heinz-Mathoi-Streli / Architekten / Bauten und Projekte / Buildings and Projects, with evaluations by Friedrich Achleitner and Otto Kapfinger. The same year, the architects dissolved their firm. In 2015, Streli built a home for drug addicts in Innsbruck, called Mentlvilla, designed in reference to Welzenbacher's Adambräu, which is now the home of the Architecture Centre of Tyrol. The house (Haus für Suchtkranke), run by the Caritas, offers housing and medical treatment. It was nominated for the architecture prize of Tyrol in 2016.

From 1983 to 1994, Streli was also president of the architecture section of the Ingenieur- und Architektenkammer für Tirol und Vorarlberg. He served on an advisory board for the city development of Linz from 1993 to 1995.

Works by Streli were part of the exhibition Autochtone Architektur in Tirol presenting the architecture of Tyrol with respect for the alpine landscape, in Munich in 1994. He served on juries for architectural competitions, such as for a new University Square in Bolzano in 2014.

Jörg Streli died in Innsbruck on 13 February 2019.

== Buildings ==
The joint projects for Heinz & Mathoi & Streli include feasibility studies, city planning, homes for one family and larger units, preschools, schools and buildings for higher education, sports facilities, stores, offices, industrial buildings and traffic buildings. Examples include:

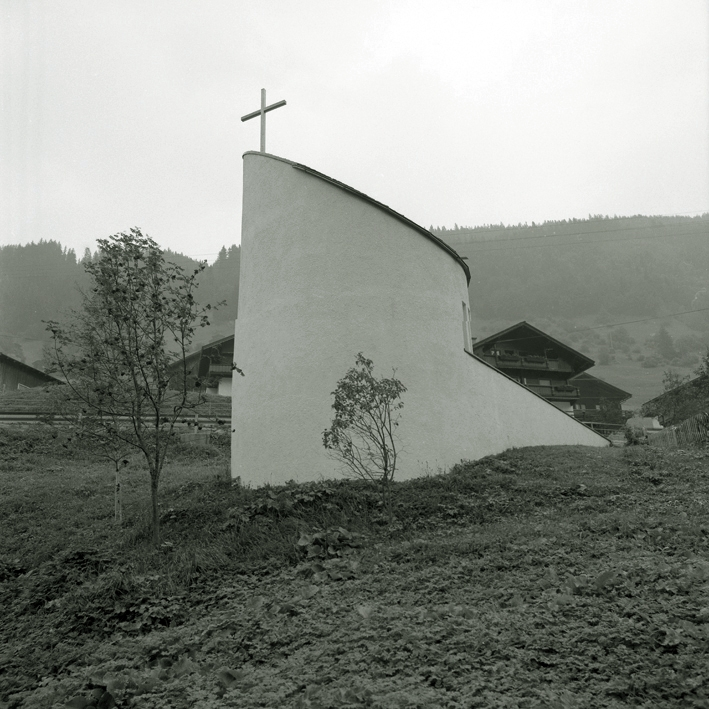
Kapelle Innerberg

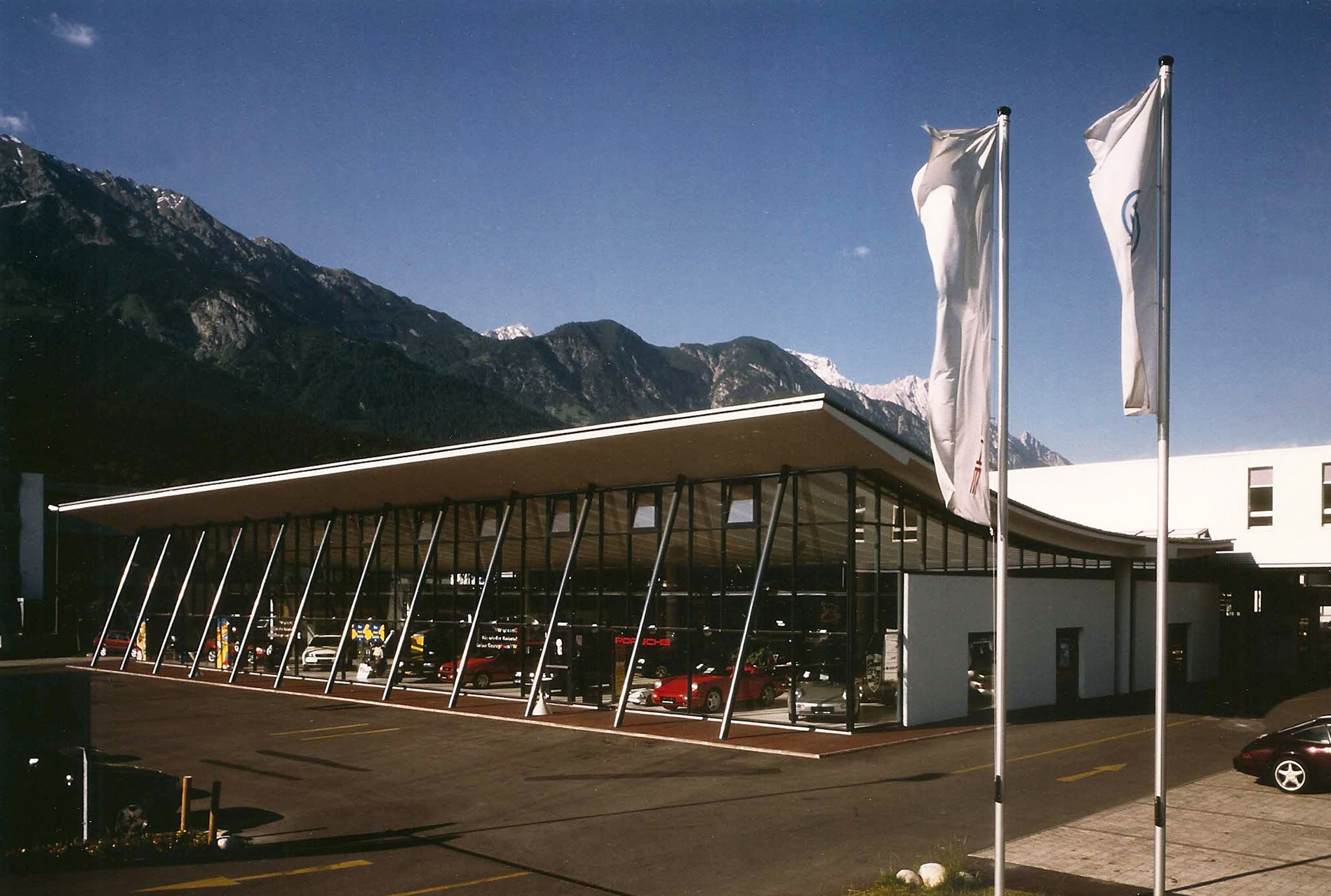
Autohaus Vowa

- 1978: Hauptschule in Fulpmes (school)
- 1978: Fremdenverkehrsfachschule in Zell am Ziller
- 1980: Landesberufsschule Feldkirch in Feldkirch, Vorarlberg
- 1981: Kapelle Innerberg in Finkenberg (chapel)
- 1982: Modegeschäft Einwaller Anna in Innsbruck (fashion store)
- 1983: Doppelhaus Knofler/Mikuz, Innsbruck (private homes)
- 1984: Landesjugendheim Jagdberg in Schlins (group housing, with Norbert Schweitzer)
- 1987: Krankenpflegeschule in Feldkirch, Vorarlberg (school)
- 1987: Seilbahn Brixen im Thale in Brixen
- 1989: Volksschule in Igls
- 1990: Porsche Interauto Verkaufscenter in Innsbruck (car dealer)
- 1993: MPreis Barwies in Mieming (grocery store chain)
- 1993: Bürohaus EBB in Innsbruck (office building)
- 1994: Eisenbahnumfahrung Innsbruck in Mils (traffic)
- 1995: Autohaus Vowa in Innsbruck (car dealer)
- 1996: Mehrzweckgebäude mit Rasthaus at the Europe Bridge (highway restaurant)
- 1996: Wohnanlage und Bürohaus in Innsbruck (housing and office building)
- 1999: Hotelfachschule Villa Blanka in Innsbruck
- 2001: Landesfeuerwehrschule Tirol in Telfs (firemen's school)
- 2004: HTBL und VA Mödling in Mödling
- 2004: Geschäftshaus Einwaller Moden in Innsbruck
- 2005: MPreis Bramberg in Bramberg
- 2008: Aufstockung Frauen- und Kopfklinik in Innsbruck (hospital extension)
