= Dieter Mathoi =

Austrian architect (1943–2012)

- Born: 26 September 1943
- Died: 18 August 2012 (aged 68)
- Education: Academy of Fine Arts, Munich
- Occupation: Architect
- Organization(s): Heinz & Mathoi & Streli

Dieter Mathoi (26 September 1943 – 18 August 2012) was an Austrian architect. With two colleagues, as the firm Heinz & Mathoi & Streli in Innsbruck, he worked for 35 years, building private homes in the alpine landscape of Tyrol, schools, offices and public buildings, among others. He opened his own office in 2008 and was known for prison buildings and for designing the controversial Kaufhaus Tyrol in Innsbruck with David Chipperfield.

== Career ==
Mathoi studied architecture at the Academy of Fine Arts, Munich, from 1963 to 1967. After several years of practice, he became an assistant at the Institut für Hochbau of Innsbruck University in 1972, where he worked until 1976.

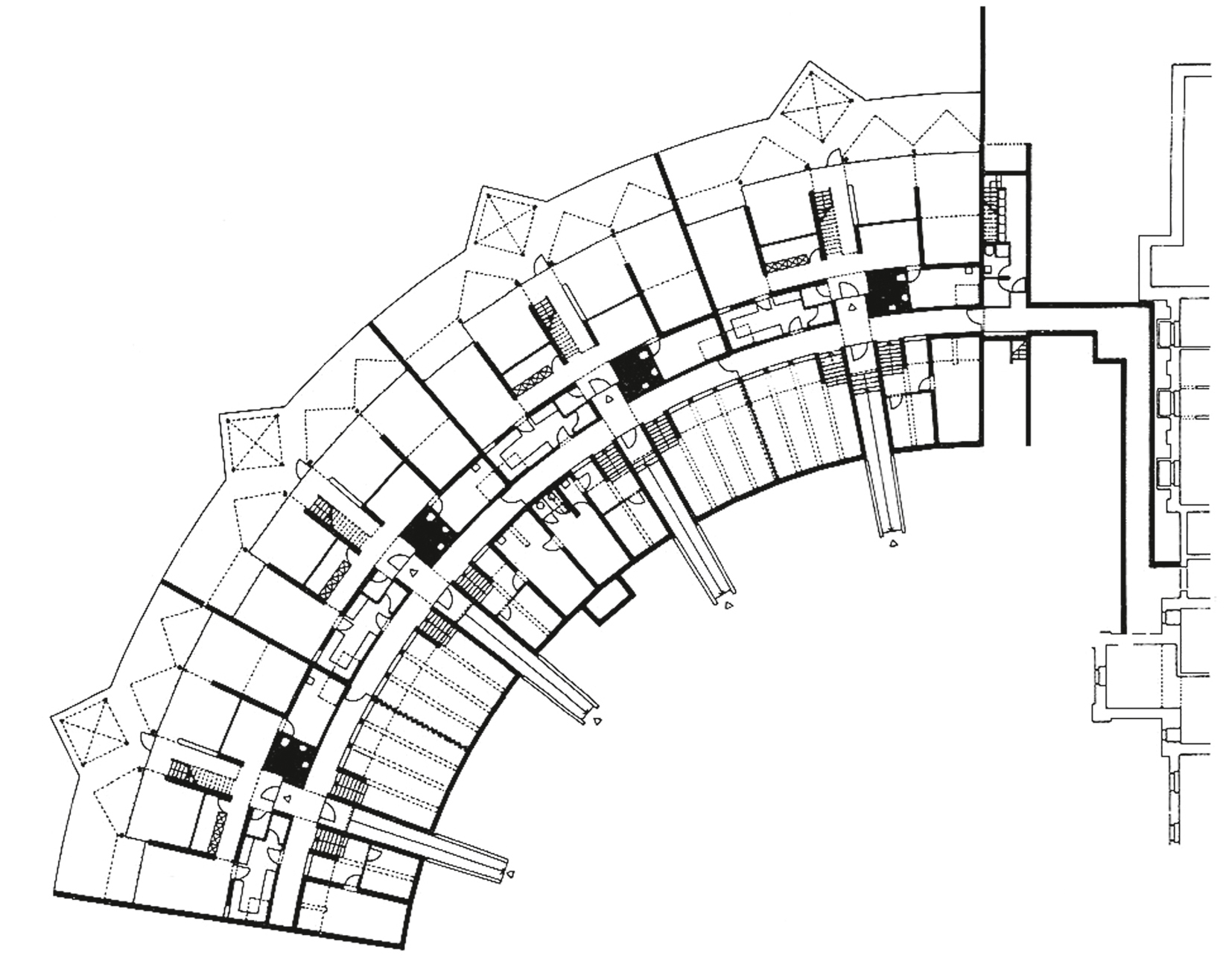
Floor plan of the Landesjugendheim in Jagdberg, Schlins

From 1973, Mathoi collaborated with two colleagues, Karl Heinz and Jörg Streli, as the firm Heinz & Mathoi & Streli. While they created many buildings jointly, each architect also pursued his own projects. Mathoi created family homes, including the house of Günther Mader, MPreis markets and a building for the car dealer Vowa in Innsbruck. Together, they built a chapel in 1982, the Sankt-Margarethen-Kapelle in Innerberg, which rises like a tower on a circular floor. They built a home for homeless children as a Gruppenwohnheim (group home) with four separate units, completed in Jagdberg, Vorarlberg, in 1984.

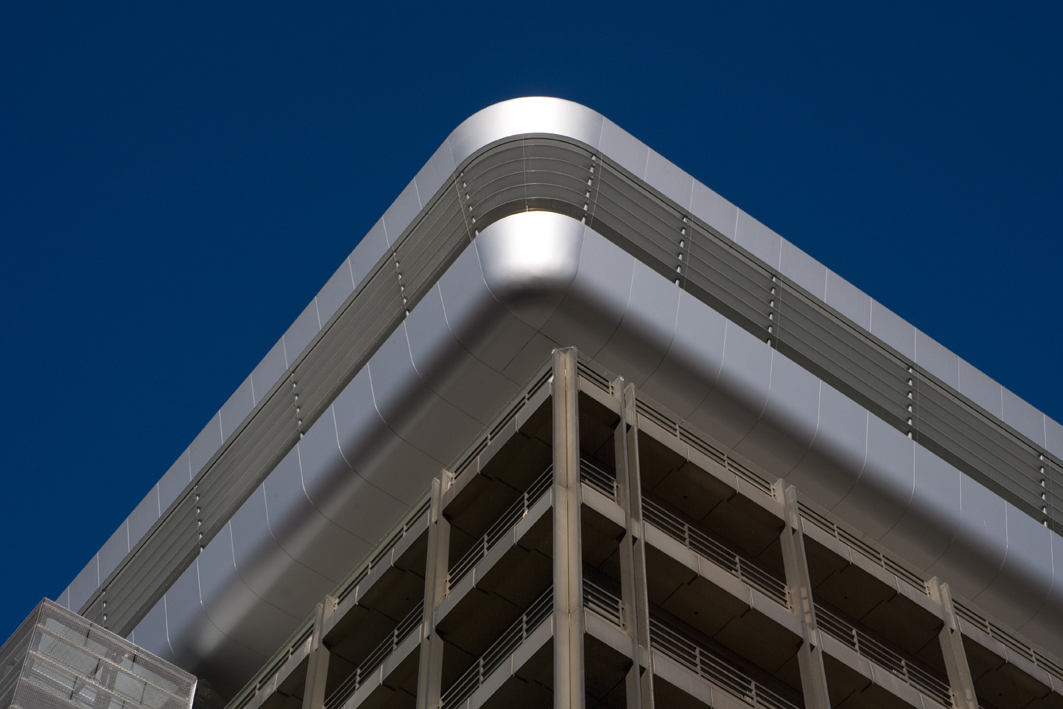
Extension of the University Hospital Innsbruck, completed 2008

The joint extension of the University Hospital in Innsbruck, created by adding a technical and a clinical floor for gynecology and neurology on top, built from 2006 to 2008, was nominated for the award of the Fundació Mies van der Rohe in 2009. In 2008, Springer published a monograph of their works, both group and individual projects, titled Heinz-Mathoi-Streli / Architekten / Bauten und Projekte / Buildings and Projects, with evaluations by Friedrich Achleitner and Otto Kapfinger. The same year, the architects dissolved their firm.

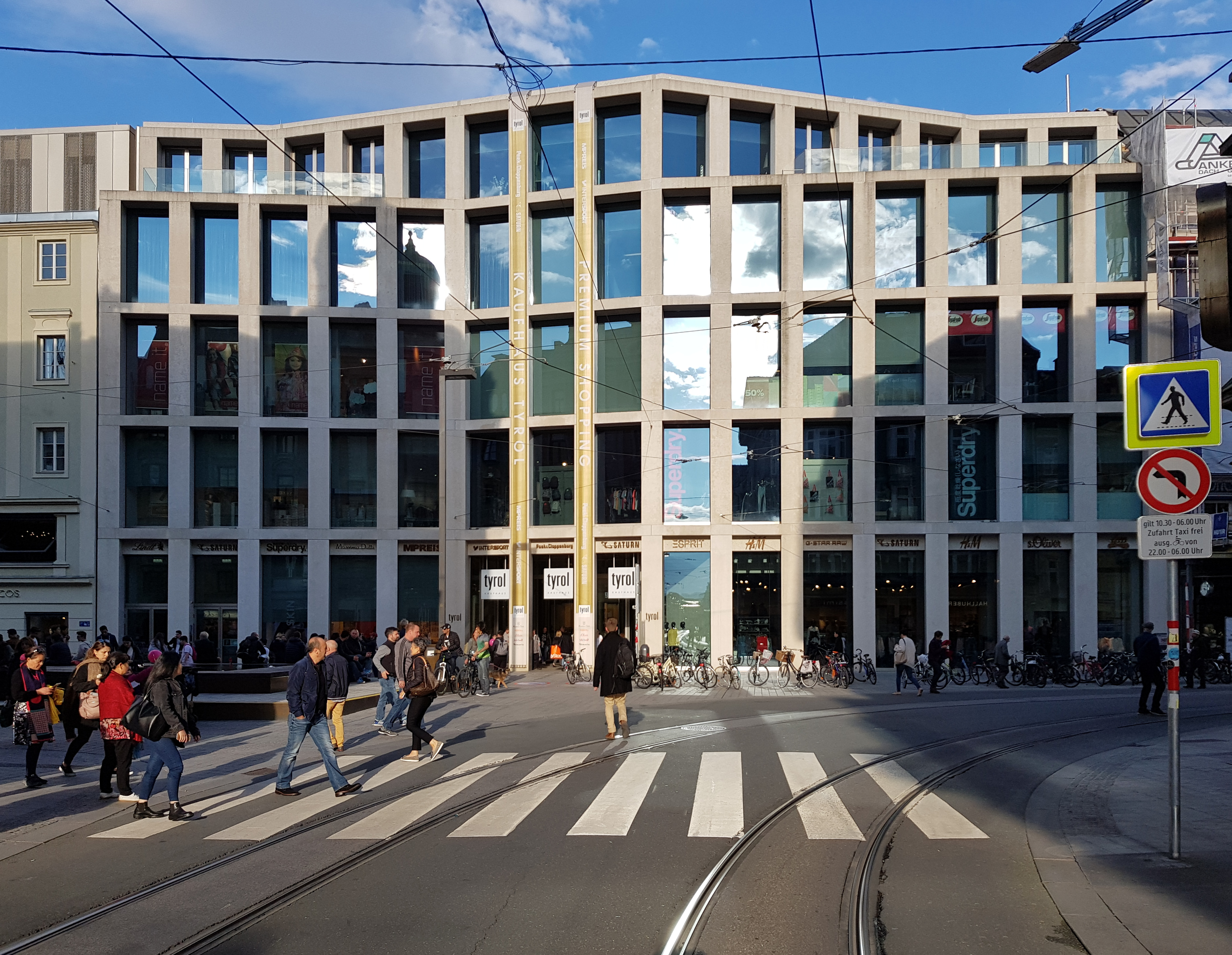
Kaufhaus Tyrol in the centre of Innsbruck

Mathoi opened his own office in 2008. A central project was the Kaufhaus Tyrol department store in the centre of Innsbruck, which Mathoi designed with David Chipperfield. The British star architect had been commissioned by the investor René Benko, after previous plans by Johann Obermoser had been criticised. The design by Chipperfield and Mathoi was initially controversial. The building, opened in 2010, was shortlisted for the prestigious European Union Prize for Contemporary Architecture, the Mies van der Rohe Award, in 2011. It won a RIBA European Award in 2011.

One of Mathoi's special projects were prisons (Justizanstalt in Austria), which he designed to enable humane treatment of the inmates. The Justizzentrum in Korneuburg in Lower Austria, built with the firm DIN A4, was awarded the 2014 Staatspreis Architektur und Nachhaltigkeit, a national prize for architecture and sustainability, as one of five buildings.

Buildings by Mathoi were displayed in the international exhibition Autochtone Architektur in Tirol, including in Munich.

Dieter Mathoi died on 18 August 2012 at age 68.

== Buildings ==
The joint projects for Heinz & Mathoi & Streli included feasibility studies, city planning, homes for single families and larger units, preschools, schools and buildings for higher education, sports facilities, stores, offices, industrial buildings and traffic buildings. Examples include:

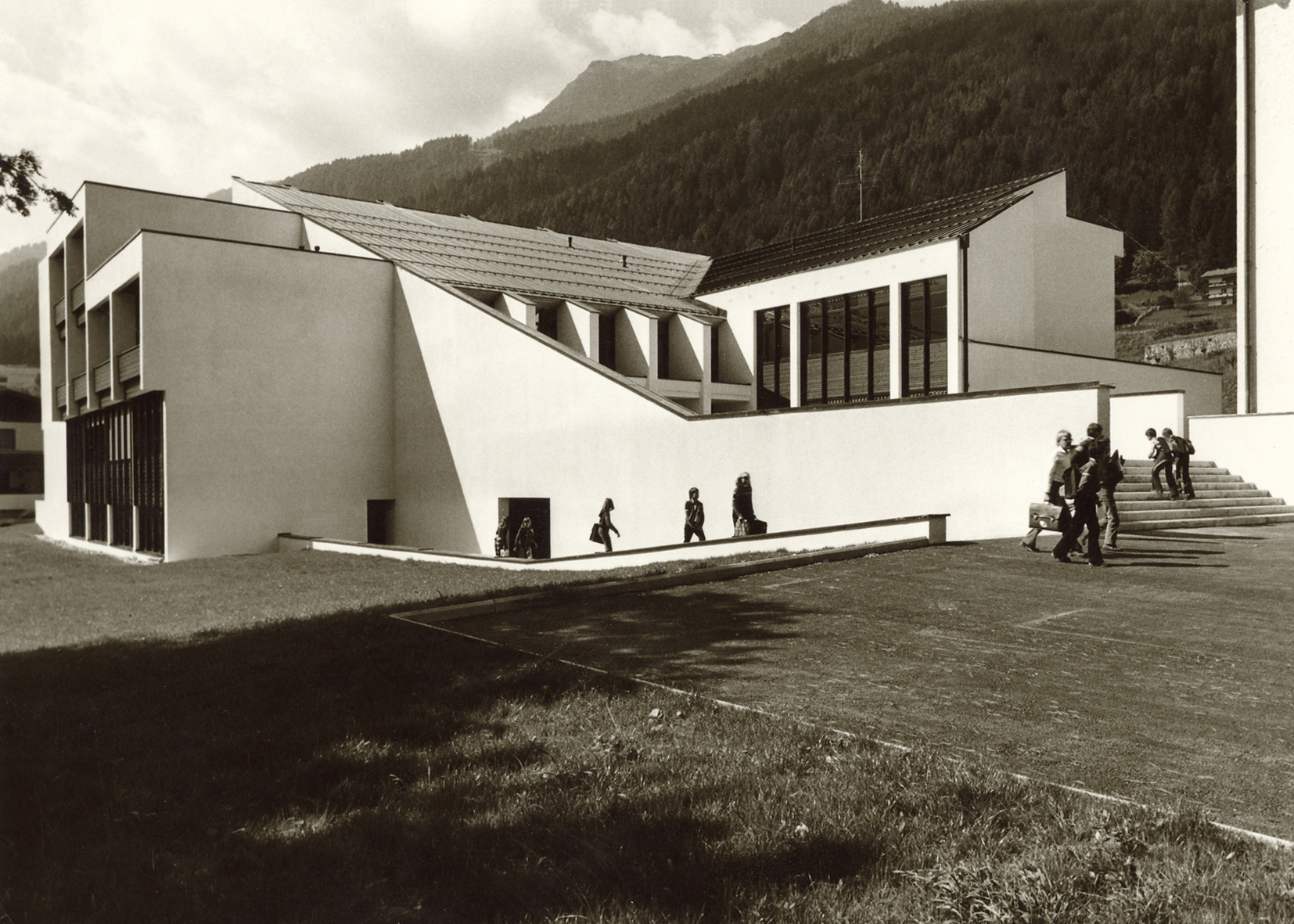
Hauptschule Fulpmes, 1978

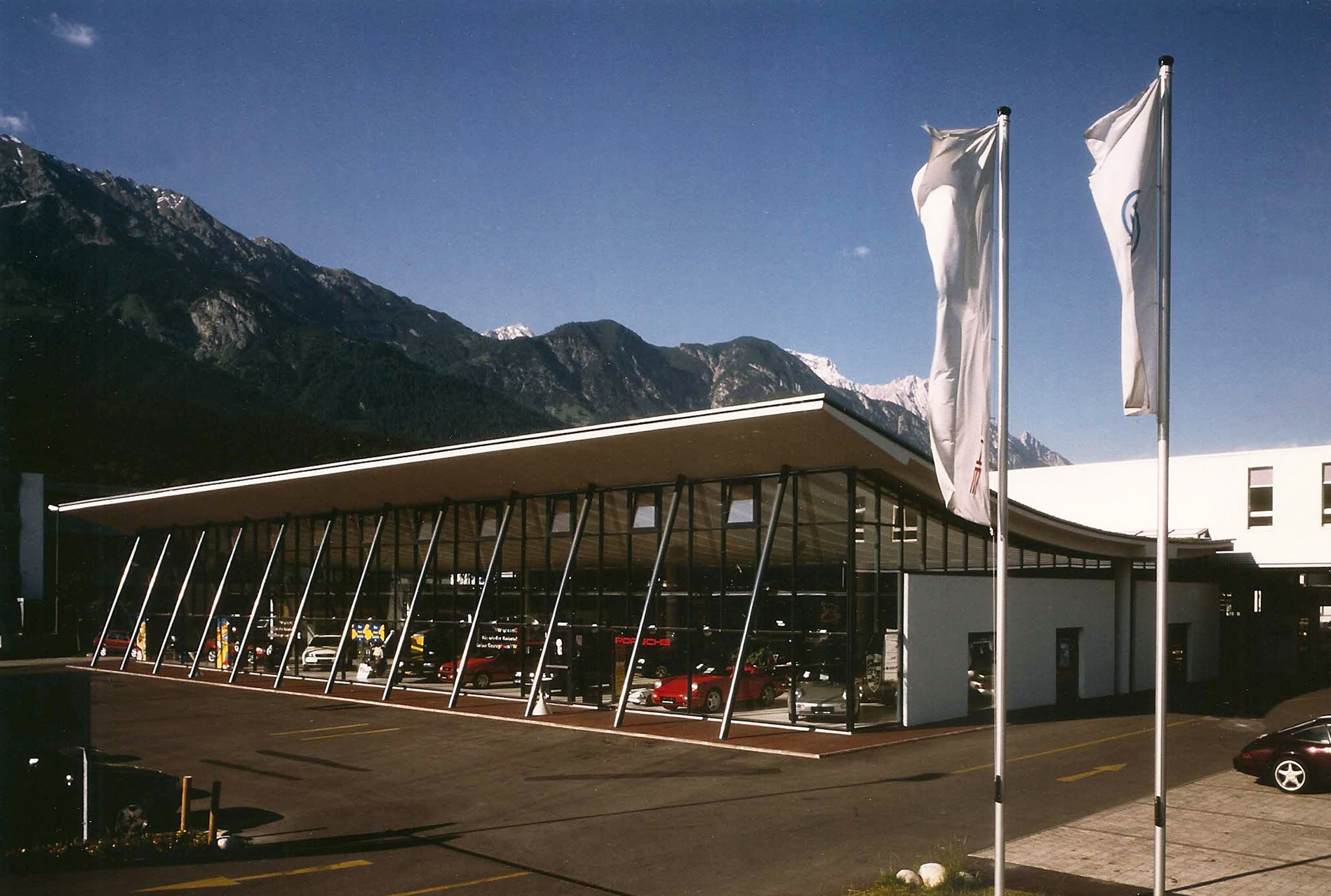
Autohaus Vowa

- 1978: Hauptschule in Fulpmes (school)
- 1978: Fremdenverkehrsfachschule in Zell am Ziller
- 1980: Landesberufsschule Feldkirch in Feldkirch, Vorarlberg
- 1981: Kapelle Innerberg in Finkenberg (chapel)
- 1982: Modegeschäft Einwaller Anna in Innsbruck (fashion store)
- 1983: Doppelhaus Knofler/Mikuz, Innsbruck (private homes)
- 1984: Landesjugendheim Jagdberg in Schlins (group housing, with Norbert Schweitzer)
- 1987: Krankenpflegeschule in Feldkirch, Vorarlberg (school)
- 1987: Seilbahn Brixen im Thale in Brixen
- 1989: Volksschule in Igls
- 1990: Porsche Interauto Verkaufscenter in Innsbruck (car dealer)
- 1993: MPreis Barwies in Mieming (grocery store chain)
- 1993: Bürohaus EBB in Innsbruck (office building)
- 1994: Eisenbahnumfahrung Innsbruck in Mils (traffic)
- 1995: Autohaus Vowa in Innsbruck (car dealer)
- 1996: Mehrzweckgebäude mit Rasthaus at the Europe Bridge (highway restaurant)
- 1996: Wohnanlage und Bürohaus in Innsbruck (housing and office building)
- 1998: Totenkapelle an der Pfarrkirche Herz-Jesu in Stans (chapel)
- 1999: Hotelfachschule Villa Blanka in Innsbruck
- 2001: Landesfeuerwehrschule Tirol in Telfs (firemen's school)
- 2004: HTBL und VA Mödling in Mödling
- 2005: MPreis Bramberg in Bramberg
- 2006: Naturparkhaus Ginzling (parking garage)
- 2008: Aufstockung Frauen- und Kopfklinik in Innsbruck (hospital extension)
