= Karl Heinz =

Austrian architect (born 1938)

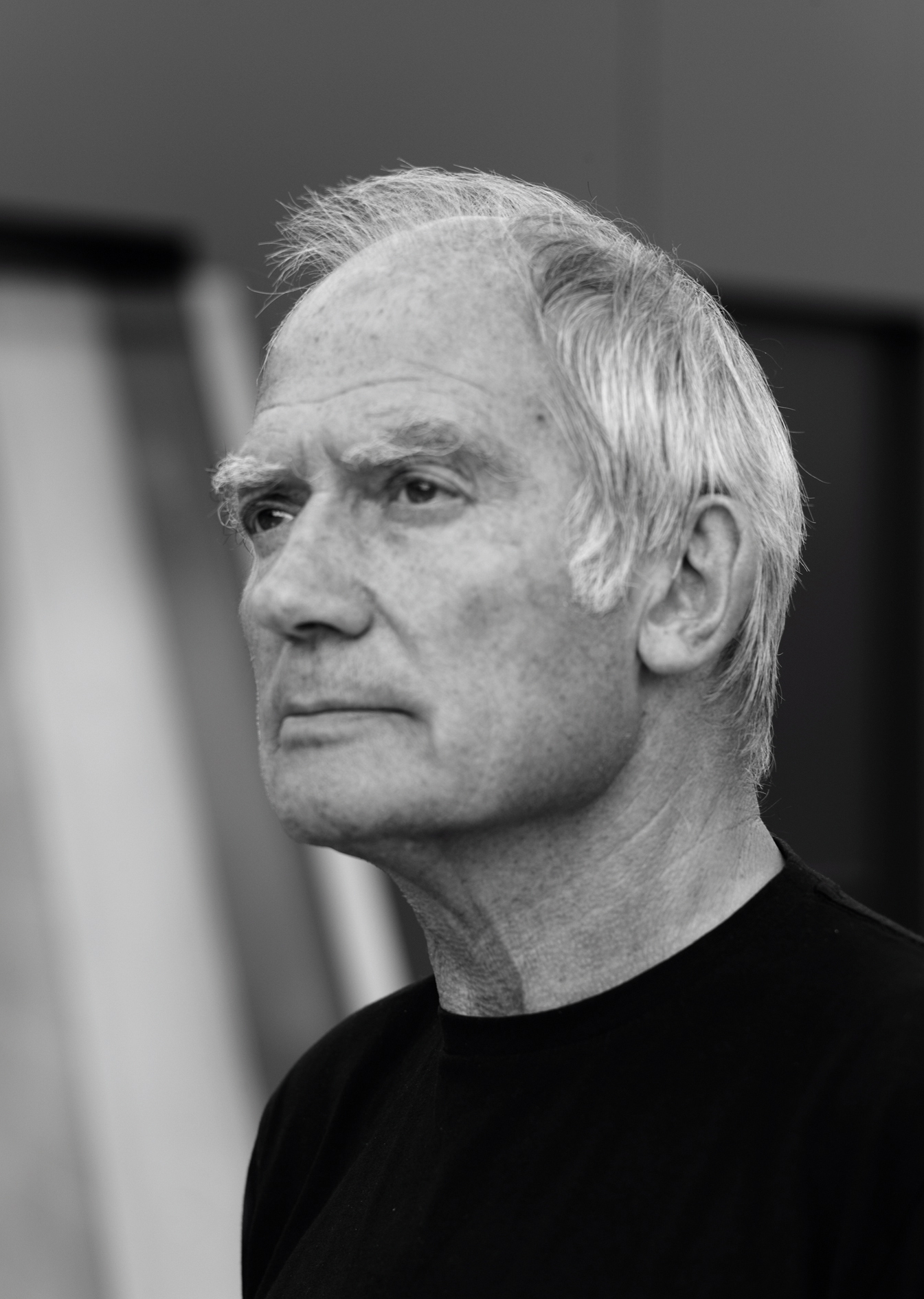
- Karl Heinz in 2013
- Born: 14 November 1938; Vienna, Austria
- Education: Technische Hochschule Wien
- Occupations: Architect; Academic teacher
- Organizations: Heinz & Mathoi & Streli; Innsbruck University

Karl Heinz (born 14 November 1938) is an Austrian architect. With two colleagues, as the firm Heinz & Mathoi & Streli, he built private homes in the alpine landscape of Tyrol, schools, offices and public buildings, among others.

== Life and career ==
Heinz was born in Vienna, the second of five children of a doctor's family. The family moved to Innsbruck in 1947.

In 1965, Heinz graduated in architecture from the Technischen Hochschule in Wien ab. He first worked from 1965 to 1973 in Düsseldorf, including the project Cologne-Bonn Airport.

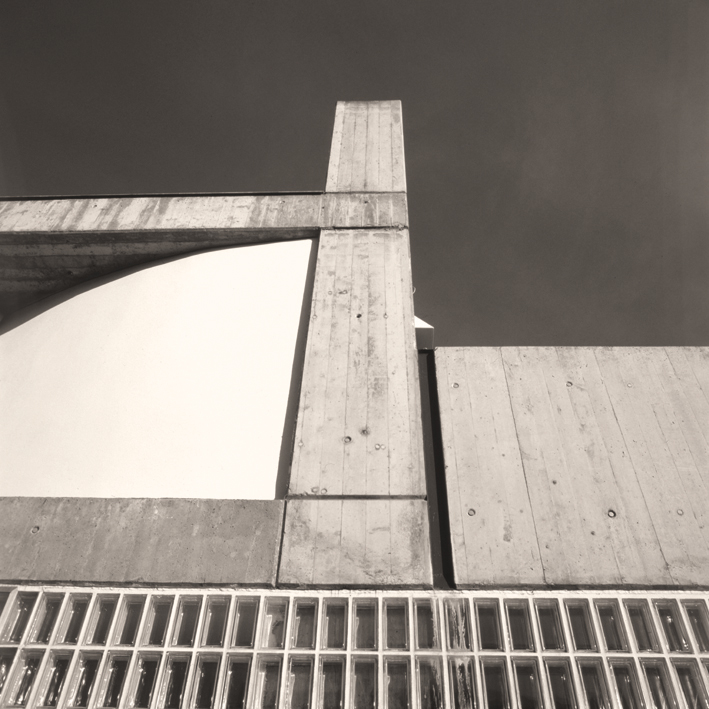
House Hoffmann, Neurum, 1982

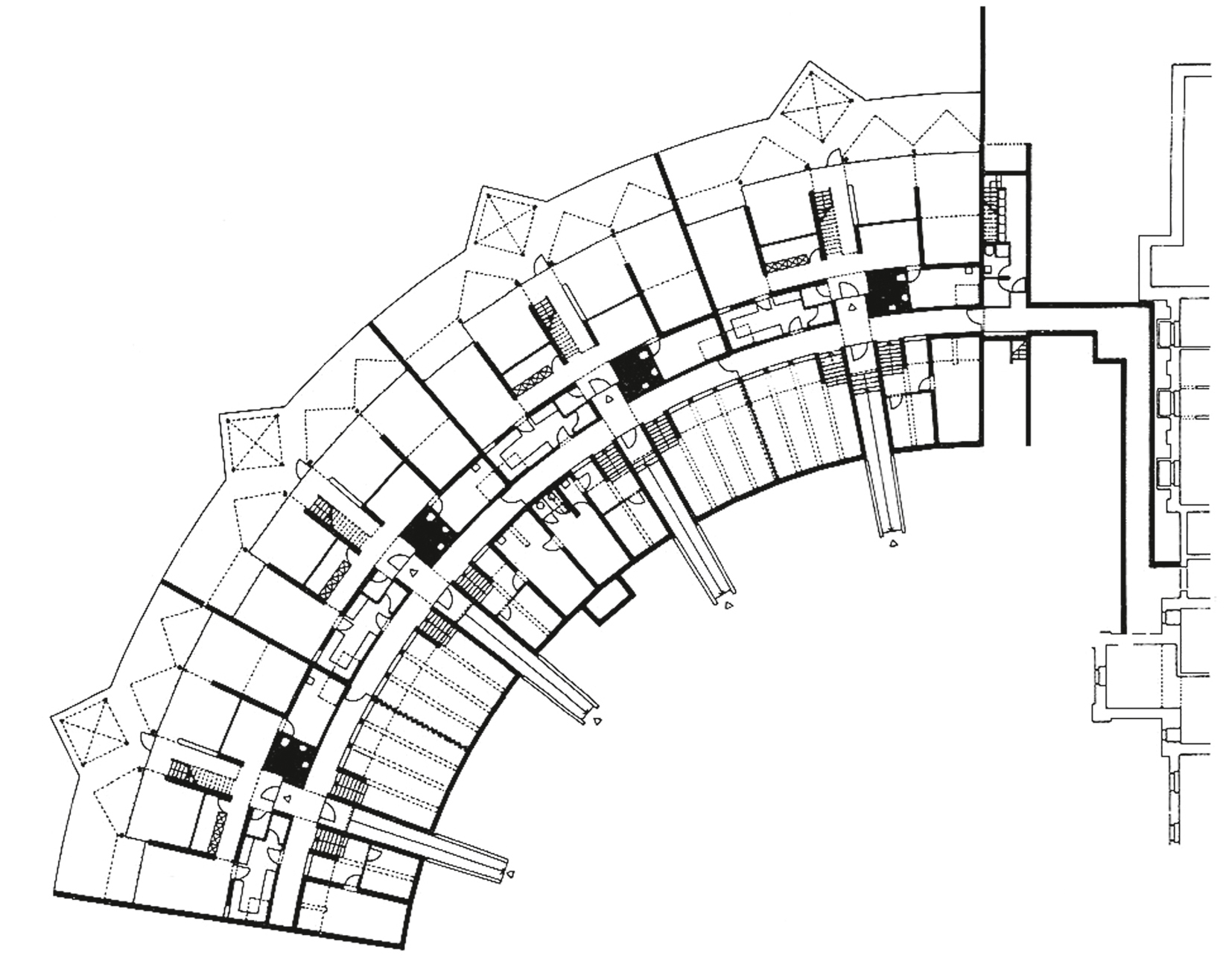
Floor plan for Landesjugendheim in Jagdberg, Schlins

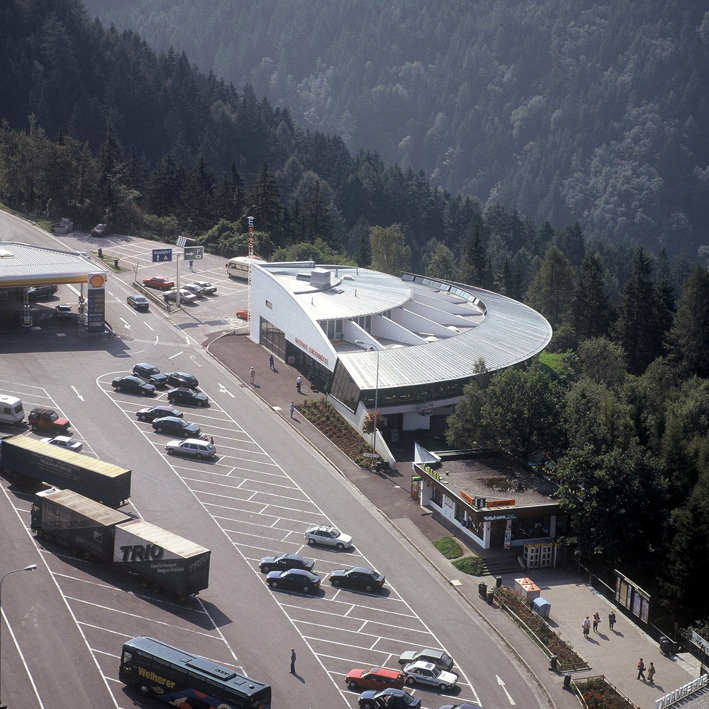
Europabrücke, 1996

From 1973, Heinz collaborated with two colleagues, Dieter Mathoi and Jörg Streli, as the firm Heinz & Mathoi & Streli. Friedrich Achleitner commented about their projects that they influenced the new specific architecture considerably ("... einen großen Einfluss auf die öffentliche Wahrnehmung der neuen Tiroler Architektur genommen"). While they created many buildings jointly, each architect also pursued his own projects. They built a home for homeless children as a Gruppenwohnheim (group home) with four separate units, completed in Jagdberg, Vorarlberg, in 1984.

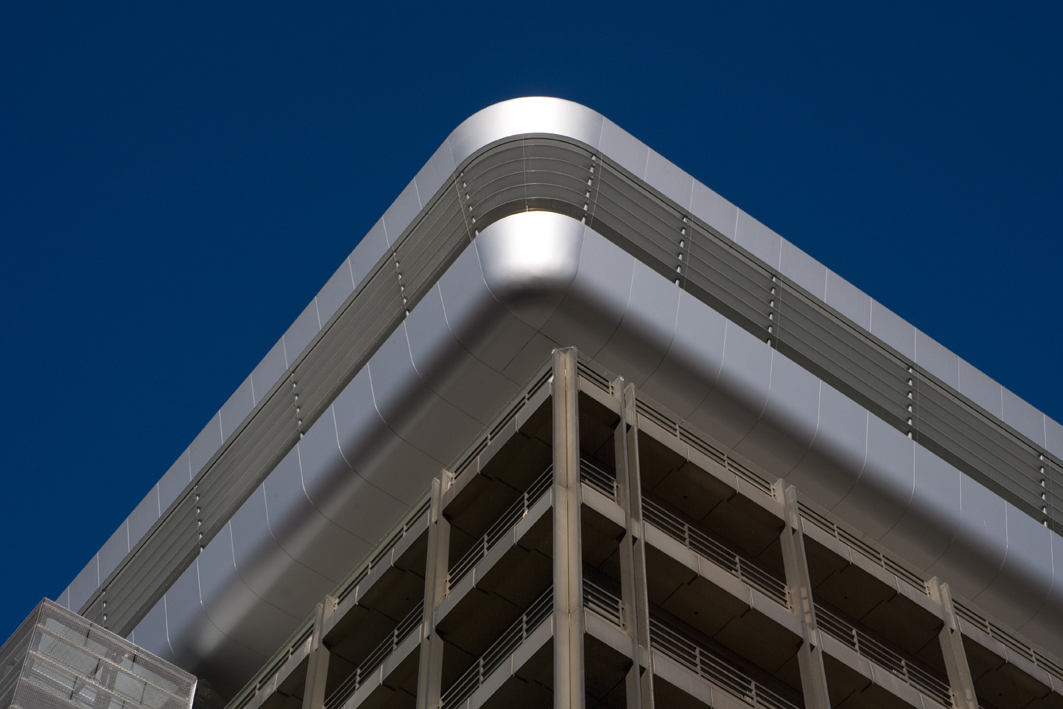
Extension of the University Hospital Innsbruck, completed 2008

The joint extension of the University Hospital in Innsbruck, created by adding a technical and a clinical floor for gynecology and neurology on top, built from 2006 to 2008, was nominated for the award of the Fundació Mies van der Rohe in 2009. In 2008, Springer published a monograph of their works, both group and individual projects, titled Heinz-Mathoi-Streli / Architekten / Bauten und Projekte / Buildings and Projects, with evaluations by Achleitner and Otto Kapfinger. The same year, the architects dissolved their firm.

Works by Heinz were part of the exhibition Autochtone Architektur in Tirol presenting the architecture of Tyrol with respect for the alpine landscape, in Munich in 1994.

Heinz worked as an assistant at the Institut für Hochbau of the Universität Innsbruck. He then taught design at the Institut für Raumgestaltung, building of schools at the Institut für Gebäudelehre, also at the Institut für Hochbau at the university.

== Buildings ==
The joint projects for Heinz & Mathoi & Streli include feasibility studies, city planning, homes for one family and larger units, preschools, schools and buildings for higher education, sports facilities, stores, offices, industrial buildings and traffic buildings. Examples include:

- 1978: Hauptschule in Fulpmes (school)
- 1978: Fremdenverkehrsfachschule in Zell am Ziller
- 1980: Landesberufsschule Feldkirch in Feldkirch, Vorarlberg
- 1981: Kapelle Innerberg in Finkenberg (chapel)
- 1982: Modegeschäft Einwaller Anna in Innsbruck (fashion store)
- 1983: Doppelhaus Knofler/Mikuz, Innsbruck (private homes)
- 1984: Landesjugendheim Jagdberg in Schlins (group housing, with Norbert Schweitzer)
- 1987: Krankenpflegeschule in Feldkirch, Vorarlberg (school)
- 1987: Seilbahn Brixen im Thale in Brixen
- 1989: Volksschule in Igls
- 1990: Porsche Interauto Verkaufscenter in Innsbruck (car dealer)
- 1993: MPreis Barwies in Mieming (grocery store chain)
- 1993: Bürohaus EBB in Innsbruck (office building)
- 1994: Eisenbahnumfahrung Innsbruck in Mils (traffic)
- 1995: Autohaus Vowa in Innsbruck (car dealer)
- 1996: Mehrzweckgebäude mit Rasthaus at the Europe Bridge (highway restaurant)
- 1996: Wohnanlage und Bürohaus in Innsbruck (housing and office building)
- 1999: Hotelfachschule Villa Blanka in Innsbruck
- 2001: Landesfeuerwehrschule Tirol in Telfs (firemen's school)
- 2004: HTBL und VA Mödling in Mödling
- 2004: Geschäftshaus Einwaller Moden in Innsbruck
- 2005: MPreis Bramberg in Bramberg
- 2008: Aufstockung Frauen- und Kopfklinik in Innsbruck (hospital extension)

== Exhibitions ==
- 1982: Architektur in Tirol, Innsbruck
- 1987: Sozialer Wohnbau in Tirol : historischer Überblick und Gegenwart, Innsbruck
- 1992: Autochthonous Architecture in Tyrol, New York, Innsbruck

== Awards ==
- 1982: Bauherrenehrung der Zentralvereinigung der Architekten Österreichs (Berufsschule Feldkirch)
- 1991: Vorarlberger Bauherrenpreis (Wohnanlage Bregenz)
- 1992, 1994: Anerkennungspreise des Landes Tirol für Neues Bauen für Volksschule lgls (1992) und Bürohaus Innsbruck (1994)
- 1996: Staatspreis für Tourismus und Architektur (Mehrzweckgebäude mit Rasthaus Europabrücke)
- 2004: Biennale, Venedig (MPreis Thaur)
- 2007: Holzbaupreis Salzburg (MPreis Bramberg)
- 2008: Nomination for the Mies van der Rohe Award (Aufstockung der Frauen-Kopfklinik Innsbruck)
- 2008: Aluminiumpreis (Aufstockung der Frauen-Kopfklinik Innsbruck)

== Literature ==
- 1000x european architecture, Verlag Braun Publishing, Salenstein 2011.
- 1000x european hotels, Verlag Braun Publishing, Salenstein 2007.
- Otto Kapfinger, Liesbeth Waechter-Böhm von Birkhäuser: Austria West: Tirol Vorarlberg. Neue Architektur, Berlin, 2003.
- Otto Kapfinger: Bauen in Tirol seit 1980. Ein Führer zu 260 sehenswerten Bauten, Anton Pustet Verlag, Salzburg 2002.
- Gegen den Strom. Katalog 9. Internationale Architektur Ausstellung – La Biennale di Venezia 2004, Austria, Venedig 2004.
- Walter Zschokke, Marcus Nitschke: ORTE Architektur in Niederösterreich 1997–2007, Springer Architektur, Wien New York, 2007.
- Liesbeth Waechter-Böhm: Neue Architektur aus Tirol / New Tyrolean Architecture, Springer Wien New York, Edition architektur.aktuell, 1998.
- Friedrich Achleitner: Österreichische Architektur im 20. Jahrhundert, Band I: Oberösterreich, Salzburg, Tirol, Vorarlberg, Residenz Verlag, Salzburg, 1980.
- Friedrich Achleitner: Österreichische Architektur im 20. Jahrhundert, Band III/2: Wien, 13.–18. Bezirk, Residenz Verlag, Salzburg, 1995.
