= 2010 in architecture =

The year 2010 in architecture involved some significant architectural events and new buildings.

== Events ==
- 12 May – Stephen T. Ayers becomes the 11th Architect of the Capitol.
- June – Broadcasting Tower, Leeds, by Feilden Clegg Bradley Studios, is the recipient of the 2010 Best Tall Building in the World award by the Council on Tall Buildings and Urban Habitat.
- November – The third World Architecture Festival is held in Barcelona.

== Buildings and structures ==
=== Buildings ===
Burj Khalifa

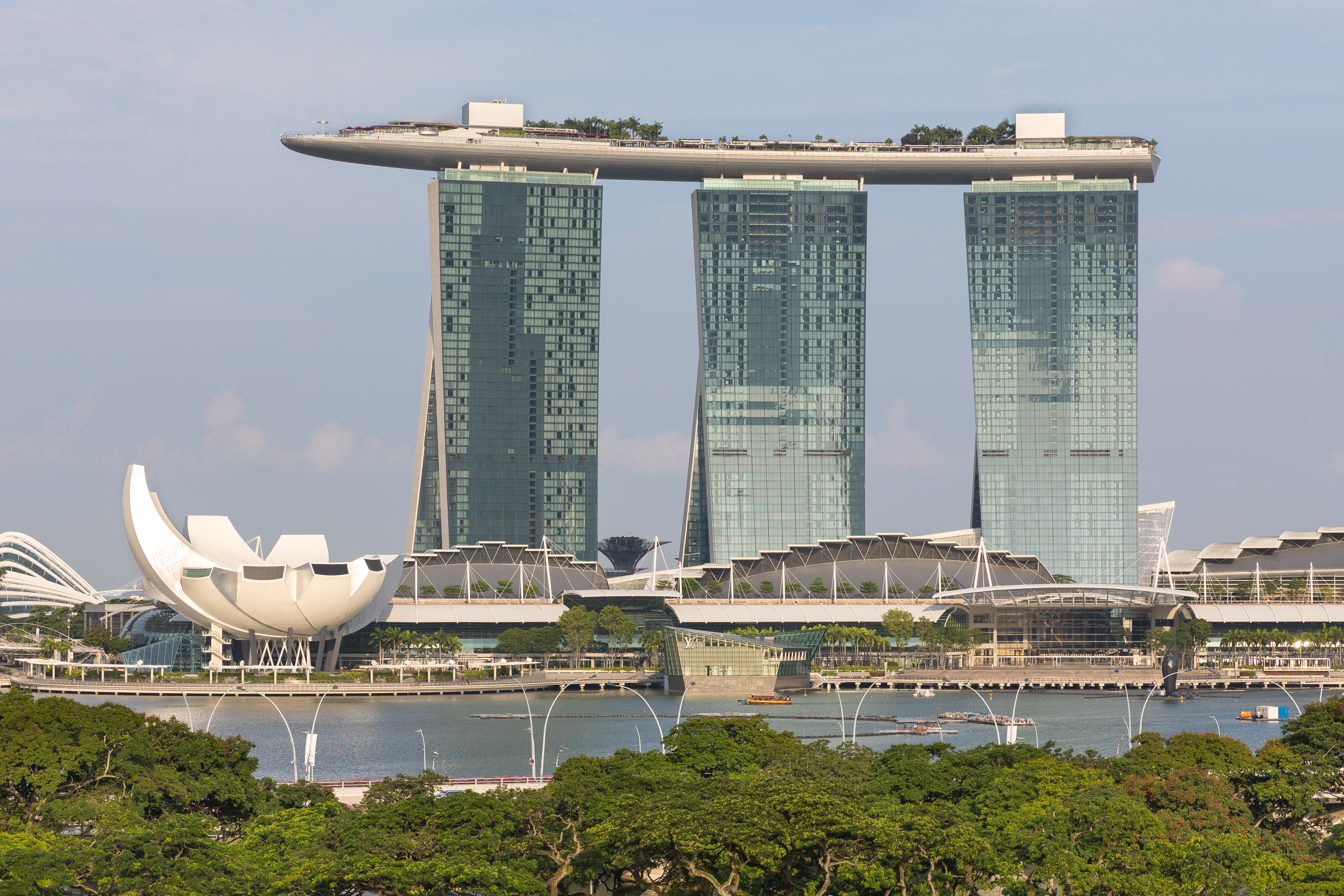
The Marina Bay Sands resort in Singapore

- 4 January – Burj Khalifa (originally known as Burj Dubai) opens in the United Arab Emirates as the tallest man-made structure in the world (2010–present), at 828 m (2,717 ft).
- 6 February – New building of Tampa Museum of Art in Tampa, Florida, designed by Stanley Saitowitz, opens to the public.
- 27 April – Marina Bay Sands resort, Singapore, designed by Moshe Safdie, has a soft opening.
- 12 May – Centre Pompidou-Metz, designed by Shigeru Ban, is inaugurated.
- May – Central Saint Giles designed by Renzo Piano, completed in Central London.
- May – MAXXI – National Museum of the 21st Century Arts in Rome, designed by Zaha Hadid, opens to the public. It wins this year's Stirling Prize.
- June – Strata SE1, residential apartments with integral wind turbines, designed by BFLS, completed in the London Borough of Southwark.
- September – Evelyn Grace Academy, a London school designed by Zaha Hadid, opens. It wins the 2011 Stirling Prize.
- October – Maggie's, a drop-in cancer care centre in Cheltenham, England, designed by Sir Richard MacCormac's MJP Architects, opens.
- 28 October – Brian C. Nevin Welcome Center at Cornell Botanic Gardens in Ithaca, New York, designed by Baird Sampson Neuert of Toronto, dedicated.
- 10 November – Sagrada Família in Barcelona, designed by Antoni Gaudí (d. 1926), is dedicated as a basilica and expiatory church following completion of the vault.
- 12 November – Canton Tower opens for the 2010 Asian Games.
- December – Sainsbury Laboratory Cambridge University, designed by Stanton Williams, completed. It wins the 2012 Stirling Prize.
- Guangzhou International Finance Center in China, by Wilkinson Eyre Architects; it later wins the 2012 Lubetkin Prize.
- International Commerce Centre opens as the tallest building in Hong Kong.
- Centennial Place (Calgary) in Calgary, Alberta.
- Kaufhaus Tyrol department store in Innsbruck, designed by David Chipperfield with Dieter Mathoi, opens.
- Dybkær Church, Silkeborg, Denmark, designed by Regnbuen Arkitekter.
- More than 70 exposition pavilions are completed for the Expo 2010 in Shanghai, China.

== Awards ==
- AIA Gold Medal – Peter Q. Bohlin (United States).
- Architecture Firm Award – Pugh + Scarpa
- Carbuncle Cup – Strata SE1
- Driehaus Architecture Prize for New Classical Architecture – Rafael Manzano Martos
- Grand Prix de l'urbanisme – Laurent Théry
- Lawrence Israel Prize – Lewis.Tsurumaki.Lewis
- LEAF Award, Overall Winner – Boogertman + Partners + Populous
- Praemium Imperiale Architecture Award – Toyo Ito
- Pritzker Architecture Prize – Kazuyo Sejima and Ryue Nishizawa (SANAA)
- RAIA Gold Medal – Kerry Clare and Lindsay Clare
- RIBA Royal Gold Medal – I. M. Pei
- Stirling Prize – Zaha Hadid for MAXXI – National Museum of the 21st Century Arts, Rome, Italy
- Thomas Jefferson Medal in Architecture – Edward O. Wilson
- Vincent Scully Prize – Adele Chatfield-Taylor
- Twenty-five Year Award – The Hajj Terminal at King Abdulaziz International Airport

== Deaths ==
- 25 February – Frank Williams, 73, US skyscraper architect (b. 1936)
- 4 March – Raimund Abraham, 77, Austrian architect (b. 1933)
- 14 March – Der Scutt, 75, American architect (b. 1934)
- 13 September – John Elliott, 73, British architect (b. 1936)

== See also ==
- Timeline of architecture
