= Kaufhaus Tyrol =

Department store in Innsbruck, Austria

Coordinates: 47°15′55″N 11°23′41″E

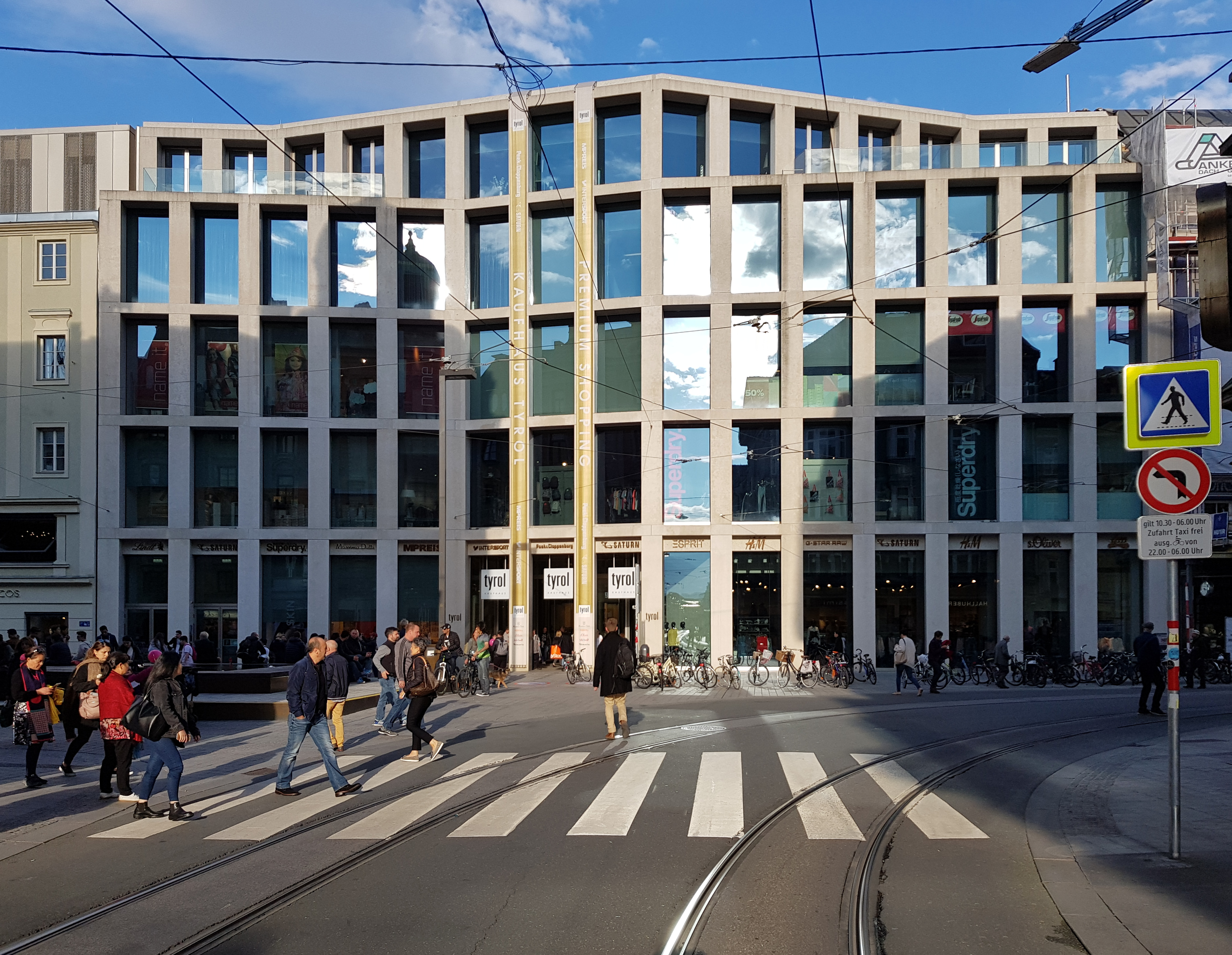
- 2010 building
- Industry: Retail
- Founded: 1908; 118 years ago
- Headquarters: Innsbruck, Tyrol, Austria
- Owner: Signa Holding
- Website: kaufhaus-tyrol.at

Kaufhaus Tyrol (German: [ˈkaʊfhaʊs tiːˈroːl]) is the current name of a department store with a long history in the centre of Innsbruck, the state capital of Tyrol, Austria. It was built in 1908, and a new building was opened in 2010. With 55 shops, it is the largest department store in Innsbruck.

== Location ==
Kaufhaus Tyrol is located in the centre of Innsbruck, now in a pedestrian area of Maria-Theresien-Straße, close to the Rathaus-Galerien and the Landhaus.

== History ==
The department store was opened in 1908 as the first in Tyrol by the Jewish families Bauer and Schwarz. Under the Nazi regime, it was forced to be sold, to the German firm Ferdinand Kraus, which ran it under this name. It was destroyed in World War II and restored after the war during a 10-year period. The name Kaufhaus Tyrol was introduced in 1966.

The store changed owners three more times. In 2004, it was bought by René Benko, who demolished it in 2005 and built a new store which opened in 2010. The new building caused controversy because of its location in the historic centre of Innsbruck.

== Architecture ==
The new building was designed by the English architect David Chipperfield in collaboration with the Innsbruck architect Dieter Mathoi. The facade was planned to not imitate historic buildings but form a bridge between old and new. A system of Thermische Bauteilaktivierung was installed for heating, ventilation, and air conditioning to save energy and minimise costs. The interior of the building is open to daylight through a glass dome.

The building won a RIBA European Award in 2011. It was among the contenders for the prestigious European Union Prize for Contemporary Architecture, the Mies van der Rohe Award, that year.
