= Justizanstalt =

Prison operated by the judicial system in Austria

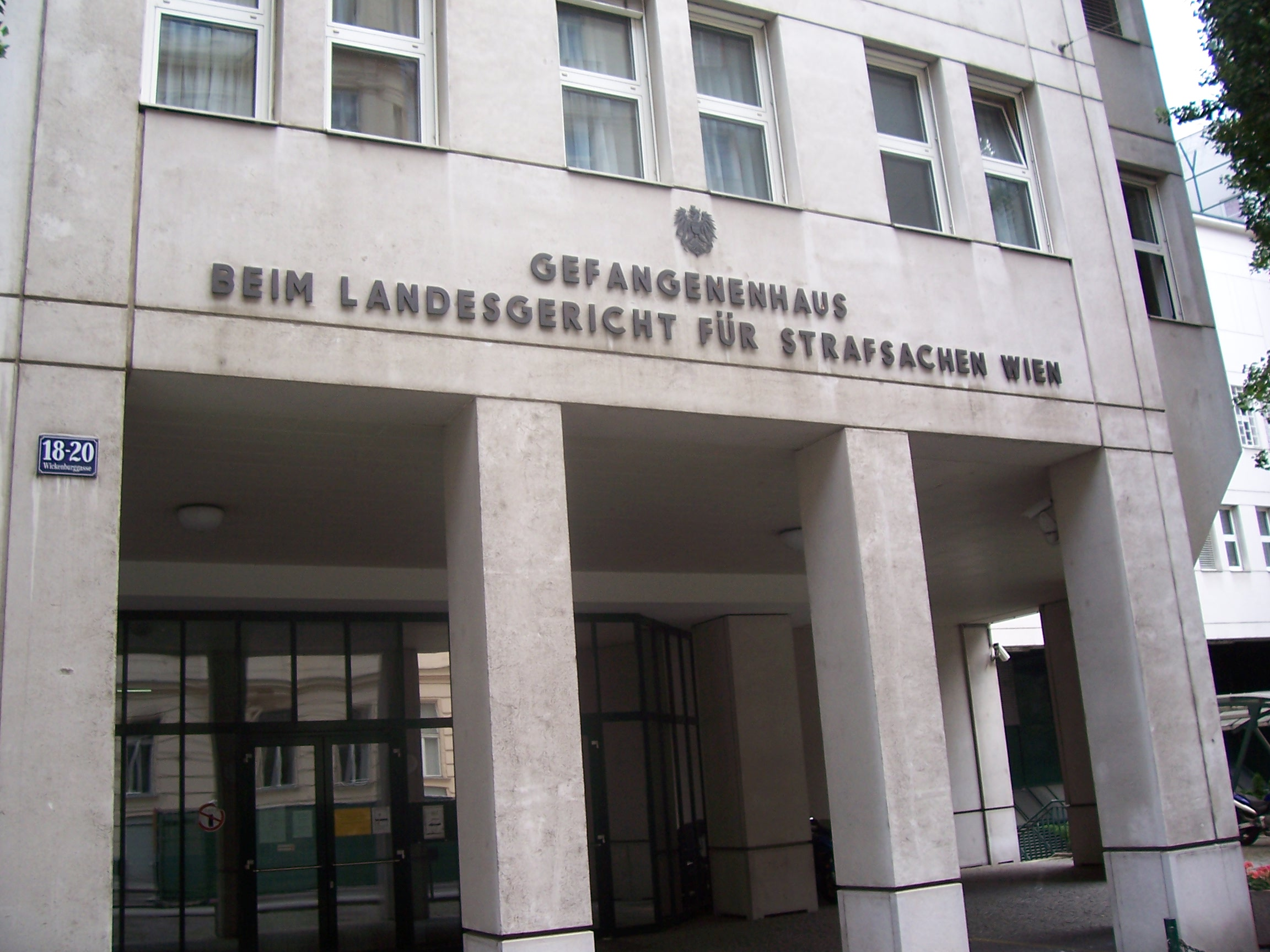
Entrance area of Justizanstalt Wien-Josefstadt

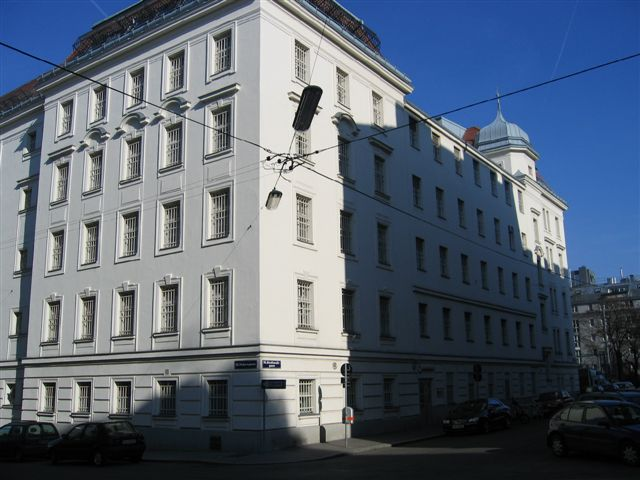
Façade of Justizanstalt Wien-Favoriten

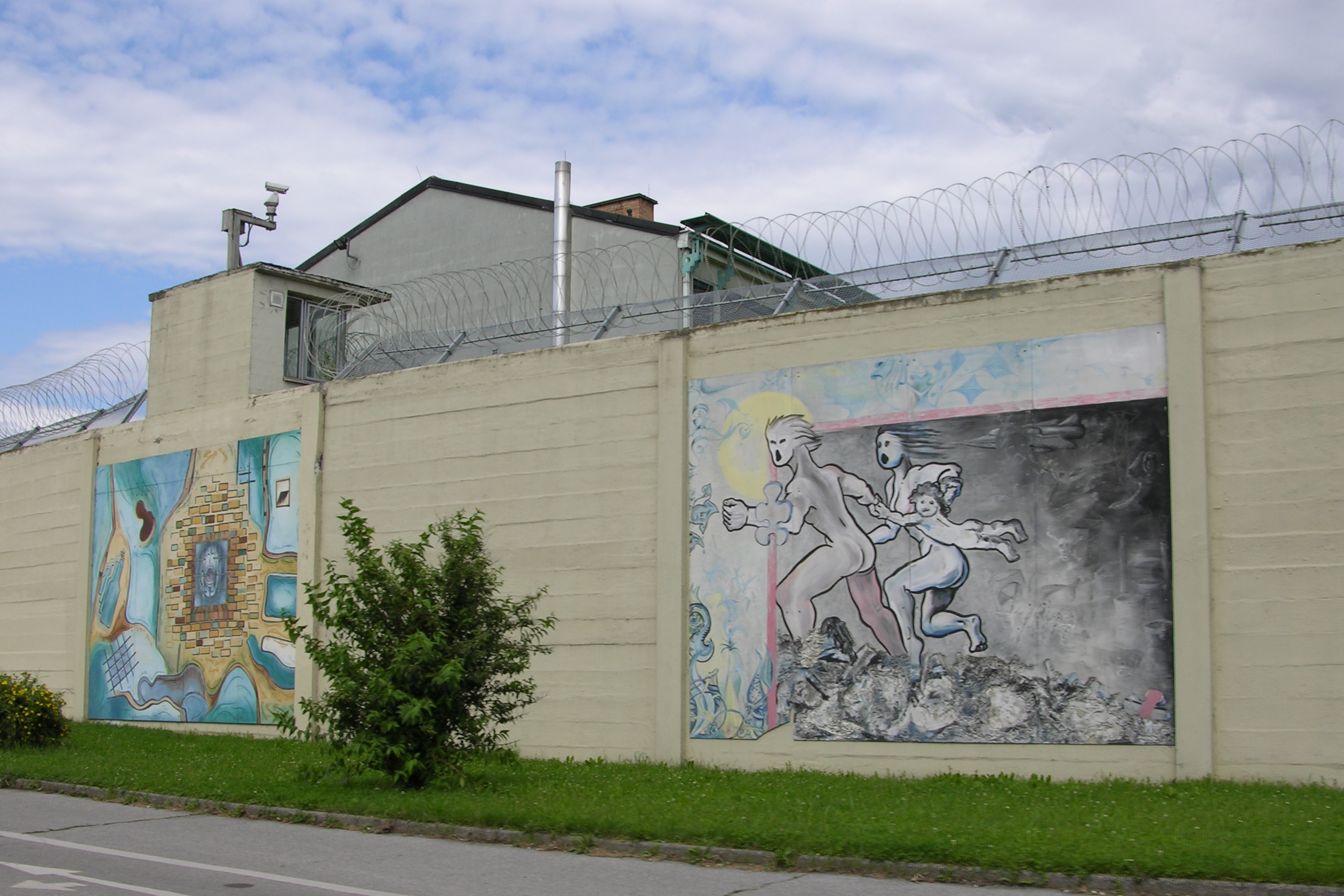
Outer wall of Justizanstalt Graz-Karlau

A Justizanstalt (JA; literally "judicial institution") is the term used in Austria for all prisons that fall under the judicial penal system. These facilities are subordinate to the Federal Ministry of Justice and are designed for the execution of custodial sentences, pre-trial detention, and the enforcement of measures under the Austrian criminal code (Maßnahmenvollzug).

Legally, a distinction is made between court prisons (Gerichtliche Gefangenenhäuser) and penal institutions (Strafvollzugsanstalten). In addition, there are four forensic-therapeutic centres for the enforcement of measures. The primary legislation governing the execution of custodial sentences in Austria is the Strafvollzugsgesetz (StVG; Penal Execution Act) and the Vollzugshandbuch (VZH; Execution Manual) issued by the Ministry. In addition to serving sentences, Austrian Justizanstalten also accommodate pre-trial detainees and persons subject to preventive measures.

Comparable institutions in Germany are called Justizvollzugsanstalten, while in Switzerland prisons under the justice system are known as Strafanstalten.

== Austrian penal system ==
=== Concept and purpose ===
The purpose of the penal system is defined in Art. STVG § 20 Act of (in German) of the Strafvollzugsgesetz (StVG). In Austria, the penal system is not based on retribution but on the principle of resocialisation. Prisoners are to be made aware during their imprisonment that their actions were wrong and reprehensible. In this sense, the fundamental idea of the Austrian penal system is the reintegration of offenders into society.

The execution of custodial sentences shall help the convicted person to adopt an honest attitude to life that is adapted to the requirements of life in the community and shall deter them from pursuing harmful inclinations. The execution shall also demonstrate the wrongfulness of the behaviour underlying the conviction.

The isolation of prisoners is primarily carried out for this purpose and to maintain security and order within the Justizanstalt. This is defined in Art. STVG § 20 Act of (in German) para. 2 StVG. Total isolation without prospect of parole, as sometimes practised in supermax prisons in the United States, contradicts the self-conception of the Austrian penal system.

This concept does not, however, apply to accommodation under the system of preventive measures (Maßnahmenvollzug). Persons detained under preventive measures are also subject to the principle of resocialisation, but the measures are usually directed against the dangerousness of the offender. The purpose of detention under preventive measures is therefore primarily the protection of society from the offender or from their "mental or psychological abnormality" and the attempt to cure it.

The detention in an institution for mentally abnormal offenders shall prevent the detained persons from committing punishable acts under the influence of their mental or psychological abnormality. The detention shall improve the condition of the detained persons to such an extent that the commission of punishable acts is no longer to be expected from them, and shall help the detained persons to adopt an honest attitude to life that is adapted to the requirements of life in the community.

In the case of preventive measures against offenders in need of withdrawal treatment, the purpose of detention is to wean the prisoner from the "abuse of intoxicating substances or addictive drugs". In contrast, dangerous recidivists are detained under preventive measures solely because of their "harmful attitude to life" and are therefore to be kept away from society.

=== Grounds and types of detention ===
In Austria, eight different types of detention are distinguished. Not all of these are served in Justizanstalten (which include penal institutions, court prisons, and special facilities); some are carried out in police station holding cells or in Police Detention Centres (Polizeianhaltezentren).

- Verwahrungshaft is a provisional detention lasting a maximum of 48 hours in a police cell when there is reasonable suspicion of a criminal offence, until transfer to pre-trial detention.
- Untersuchungshaft (pre-trial detention) is a form of detention for persons suspected of a criminal offence; it may last up to two years or until the start of the main criminal trial. It is served in court prisons (gerichtliche Gefangenenhäuser).
- Strafhaft (custodial sentence) arises from a court judgment or as a substitute custodial sentence for uncollectible fines. It is served either in a court prison or in a penal institution.
- Unterbringung in a Forensic-Therapeutic Centre is a preventive measure involving deprivation of liberty, ordered in addition to any custodial sentence and served in the justice system’s forensic-therapeutic centres.
- Administrative punitive detention (Verwaltungsstrafhaft) lasting from 12 hours to 6 weeks may be imposed for administrative offences or for uncollectible administrative fines. It is usually served in Police Detention Centres.
- Police detention (Polizeiliche Haft) is a provisional detention lasting a maximum of 24 hours in a police cell in connection with proceedings for an administrative offence.
- Aliens police detention (Fremdenpolizeiliche Haft) is the immediate placement of persons in police cells pending appearance before the aliens police authority.
- Schubhaft is the detention of persons scheduled for deportation under the Aliens Police Act 2005, for a maximum of 18 months, in a Police Detention Centre.

=== Special features of the penal system ===
==== Judicial assistance for Liechtenstein ====
Under the Treaty between the Republic of Austria and the Principality of Liechtenstein on the Accommodation of Prisoners, sentences imposed by Liechtenstein courts are served in Austrian Justizanstalten. Because the Principality of Liechtenstein previously had no penal institutions of its own, all prisoners from the microstate were transferred to the Austrian justice system for the duration of their sentence and accommodated in Austrian prisons.

Liechtenstein now has its own National Prison (Landesgefängnis) with 20 places, which for a time also accepted prisoners serving sentences of less than two years. However, because the Liechtenstein National Prison no longer met international standards, a 2017 memorandum of understanding between the Liechtenstein and Austrian governments provided that all convicted prisoners and persons subject to preventive measures would again be transferred to the Austrian justice system.

This is possible only if the prisoner was convicted of an act that is also punishable in Austria and the length of the sentence does not exceed the maximum provided for under Austrian law. In addition, the prisoners must not have been convicted of political or tax offences.

The treaty was signed on 4 June 1982 by the then Austrian Minister of Justice, Christian Broda, and the Liechtenstein Head of Government, Hans Brunhart. The instruments of ratification were exchanged on 9 June 1983 between Austrian Federal President Rudolf Kirchschläger (countersigned by Federal Chancellor Fred Sinowatz) and Prince Franz Joseph II of Liechtenstein. The judicial assistance agreement entered into force on 1 September 1983.

In 2012, 15 Liechtenstein prisoners serving a total of 4,338 prison days were accommodated in Austrian penal institutions. This corresponded to just under 25 per cent of the total capacity utilisation of the Liechtenstein National Prison.

==== Prison decongestion programme ====
In the summer of 2007, the then Minister of Justice Maria Berger proposed a prison decongestion programme to relieve overcrowding in Austrian prisons. The programme provided, among other things, that persons sentenced to a substitute custodial sentence for unpaid fines would not have to serve the prison term but could instead perform community service. The motto of the initiative, coined by the Minister, was "Sweat instead of sit" (Schwitzen statt Sitzen).

Further elements of the package included expanding conditional release by abolishing the general-prevention requirement for release after two-thirds of the sentence, increased use of directives and probation assistance, waiving execution of a custodial sentence in exchange for deportation and a re-entry ban, and the introduction of electronic monitoring (ankle monitors) in the Austrian penal system.

Although the ÖVP, the coalition partner of Berger's SPÖ in the Gusenbauer cabinet, initially reacted sceptically, ÖVP politicians ultimately signalled their approval. Only the BZÖ and the FPÖ rejected the programme.

The Minister countered critics by stating that she did not expect many convicted persons to take up the programme; rather, she anticipated an increase in the number of people who would pay their fines after all in order to avoid the "threat" of community work. According to Berger, the measures were intended to free up as many as 10,000 prison places.

On 7 November 2007 the cabinet approved the bill and forwarded it to the National Council, which passed it together with a series of other legislative amendments on 5 December. The new decongestion package entered into force on 1 January 2008.

Due to the severe overcrowding of Austrian prisons, the first conditional releases under the new rules began shortly after the law took effect.

In a July 2008 press release summarising her tenure, Minister Berger described the decongestion programme as a complete success. Average prison occupancy fell from 8,850–9,100 in 2007 to as low as 8,044 in early July 2008. At the same time, the number of conditional releases rose from 923 in the first half of 2007 and 845 in the second half to 1,584 in the first half of 2008. In the same period, 152 non-Austrian prisoners from 30 countries made use of the newly created option of leaving the country in lieu of serving their sentence, combined with a re-entry ban.

==== Justice Support Agency ====
In April 2008 it became known that the Federal Ministry of Justice planned to outsource a narrowly defined part of penal-system tasks to a private company. With the newly created Justizbetreuungsagentur (Justice Support Agency), it was intended to make it easier to employ specialist doctors and psychologists in prisons via the agency. The trigger for this rethink was the sharply rising costs of caring for persons detained under preventive measures for mentally abnormal offenders. Since the Ministry could no longer meet the increased need for specialist staff with its own budgeted positions, doctors and psychologists were to be employed under private-law contracts through the agency in future.

Criticism came primarily from the Austrian Court of Audit (Rechnungshof), the Austrian Ombudsman Board (Volksanwaltschaft), the staff representation of non-uniformed justice employees, and the Green justice spokesperson in the National Council, Albert Steinhauser. In particular, there were fears of a loss of quality in care. According to the Ministry, the criticism was examined and the draft law revised accordingly.

On 14 May the final bill was submitted to the National Council and adopted on 5 June. The Justizbetreuungsagentur-Gesetz thereby entered into force.

==== Electronic monitoring ====
Electronic monitoring, colloquially known as the electronic ankle monitor or "ankle bracelet", is an option for mitigating sentences in the Austrian penal system. It has been legally available since 1 September 2010. This form of detention allows the prisoner to remain at home under house arrest while being monitored by an electronic device. Its primary purpose is to relieve pressure on prisons while preventing complete detachment from the offender’s social and professional environment, which also benefits resocialisation. Persons subject to preventive measures (Maßnahmenvollzug) are generally excluded. For sex offenders, approval is made more difficult or impossible by requiring an expert opinion.

== Types of Justizanstalten ==
The law distinguishes between court prisons (gerichtliche Gefangenenhäuser), penal institutions (Strafvollzugsanstalten), and special institutions (Art. StVG § 8 Act of (in German) StVG). In practice, there are also specialised prisons for juveniles, female offenders, and prisoners with tuberculosis. Some Justizanstalten have attached external branches where relaxed regimes are usually applied.

=== Court prisons ===
There are 15 court prisons in Austria, with one attached to each of the 16 regional courts responsible for criminal matters. For the Steyr Regional Court, this function is performed by a branch of Garsten Prison (Außenstelle Steyr), which was an independent Justizanstalt until 2010. Most court prisons are structurally integrated into or located immediately adjacent to the courthouse building. Exceptions are the prisons in Salzburg and Innsbruck, which are situated some distance from the city centres – in Salzburg’s case in the neighbouring municipality of Puch bei Hallein. Court prisons mainly hold remand prisoners (Untersuchungshäftlinge) and serve custodial sentences of up to 18 months.

=== Penal institutions ===
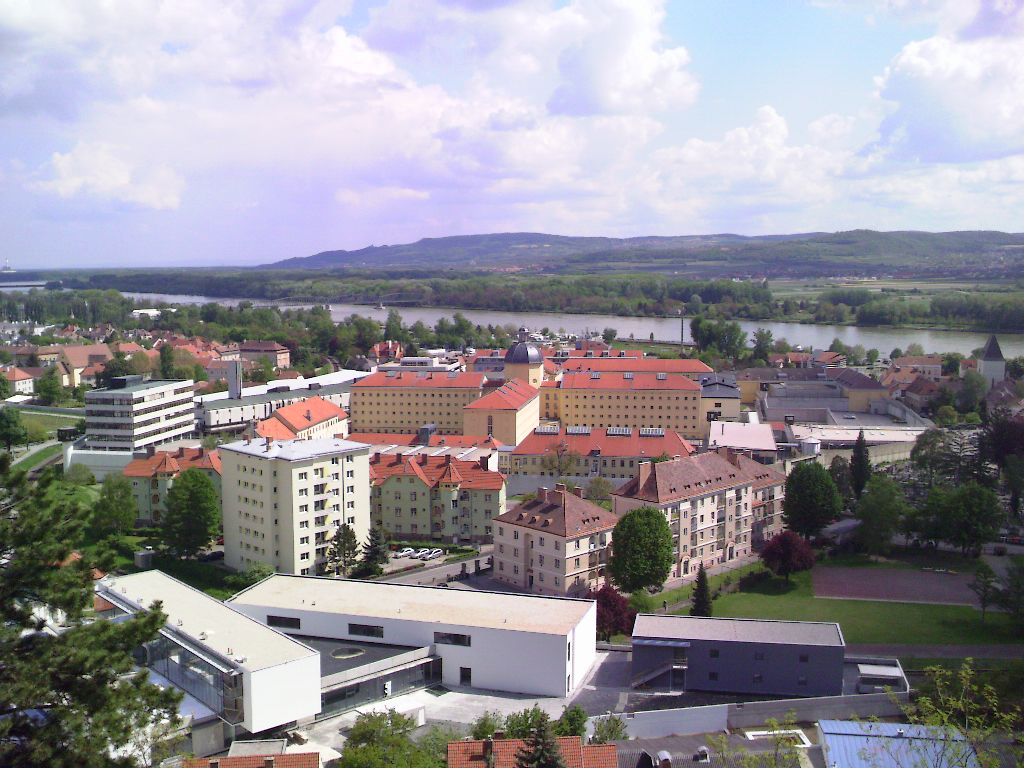
Penal institution Stein in Krems

Penal institutions are not attached to a specific court but usually cover several court districts. They are responsible for executing custodial sentences longer than 18 months, up to life imprisonment. Exceptions are permitted only if the designated penal institution is unsuitable for commencing the sentence; in such cases the sentence may begin in the court prison of the prisoner’s home district, followed by transfer.

Of the eight penal institutions in Austria, seven are for men. There is one women’s penal institution in Schwarzau am Steinfeld, which also accommodates female juveniles and women subject to preventive measures. Only about five per cent of all Austrian prisoners are female.

There are no statutory provisions for accommodating prisoners according to their level of dangerousness, but the Directorate-General for the Execution of Sentences and Measures decides in cases of exceptional danger or particularly long sentences. Such prisoners are usually placed in the Justizanstalten Graz-Karlau, Stein, Garsten, or Suben, which are primarily responsible for sentences exceeding 15 years.

=== Forensic-therapeutic centres ===
In addition to ordinary imprisonment, offenders may be placed in a forensic-therapeutic centre under the preventive-measures regime (Maßnahmenvollzug). Placement depends solely on the offender’s dangerousness, not on the offence or sentence length. An offender may be committed to an institution for dangerous recidivists, for offenders in need of withdrawal treatment, or for mentally abnormal offenders. The first concerns general dangerousness; measures for withdrawal-treatment offenders are equivalent to compulsory drug detoxification; measures for mentally abnormal offenders resemble psychiatric detention.

Measures for withdrawal-treatment offenders can be carried out in almost any Justizanstalt (though Favoriten Prison is specifically designed for this purpose). Dangerous recidivists are placed in Sonnberg Prison in Hollabrunn. Mentally abnormal offenders who lack criminal responsibility are placed in the forensic-therapeutic centres Göllersdorf or Asten; those who are criminally responsible are placed in the Mittersteig Forensic-Therapeutic Centre in Vienna. Asten Prison also functions as a forensic psychiatry facility for less dangerous mentally abnormal offenders.

=== Juvenile prisons ===
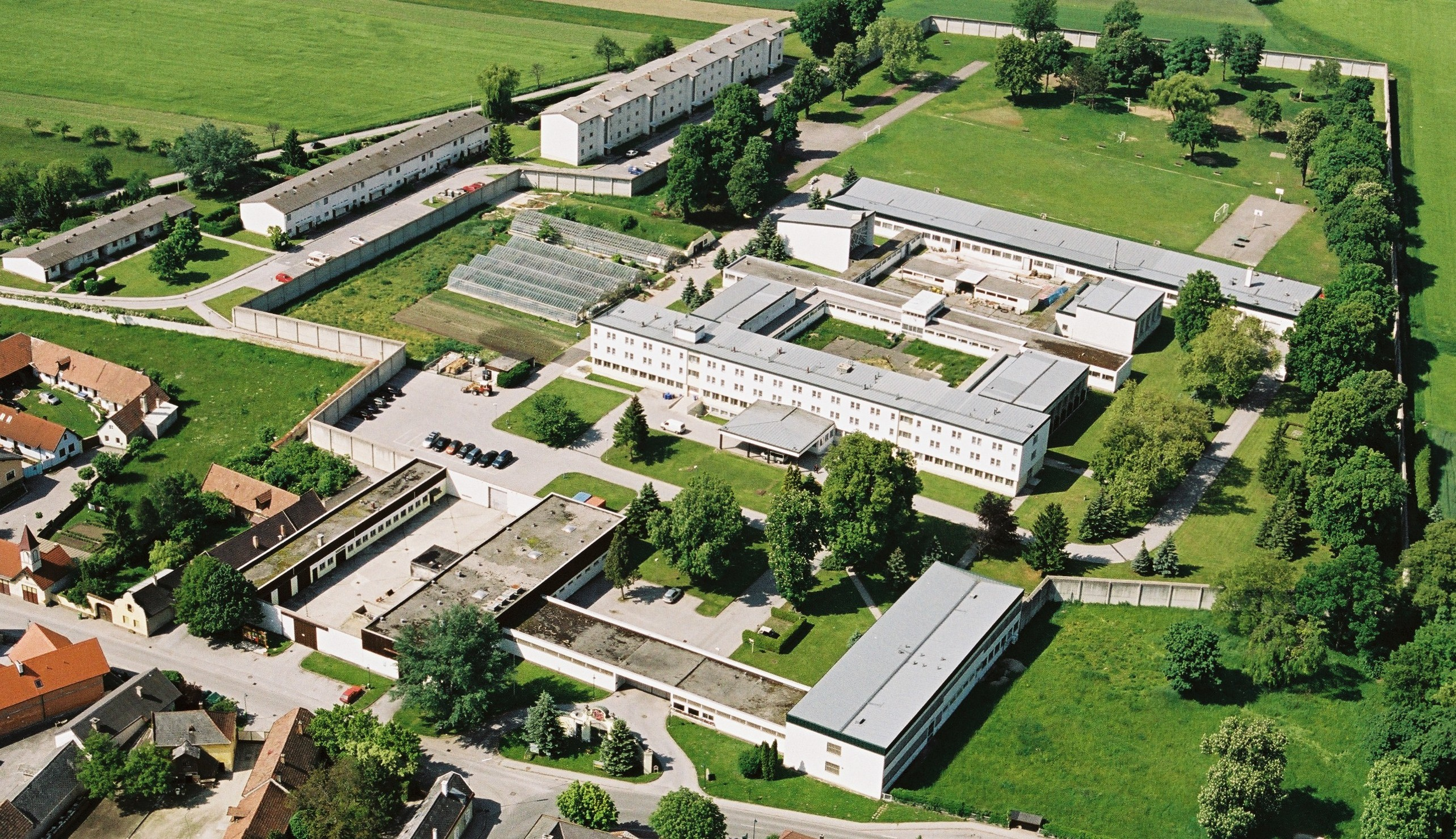
Aerial view of the former Gerasdorf Juvenile Prison

Approximately three per cent of prisoners in Austria are juveniles (aged 14–18), and around eight per cent are classified as "young adults" (18–21). Almost all Justizanstalten have separate juvenile wings for males aged 14 to a maximum of 27. Forensic-therapeutic centres also have sections for juveniles subject to preventive measures. Female juveniles are generally held in Schwarzau women’s prison.

Until 2024 there was a dedicated Gerasdorf Juvenile Prison in Gerasdorf bei Wien. Until 2003 a juvenile prison existed in Vienna’s Erdberg district at the Youth Court. Since the abolition of the Youth Court, juvenile offenders have been accommodated in Wing D of Josefstadt Prison in Vienna. A new central juvenile prison is currently being established next to Simmering Prison at Münnichplatz in the Viennese district of Kaiserebersdorf.

Adults may generally be held in the juvenile system only up to age 24. If less than one year of their sentence remains, they may stay longer, but by age 27 at the latest all prisoners must be transferred to the adult system. All special provisions for juvenile imprisonment are regulated in the seventh section of the Youth Court Act 1988.

== Locations ==
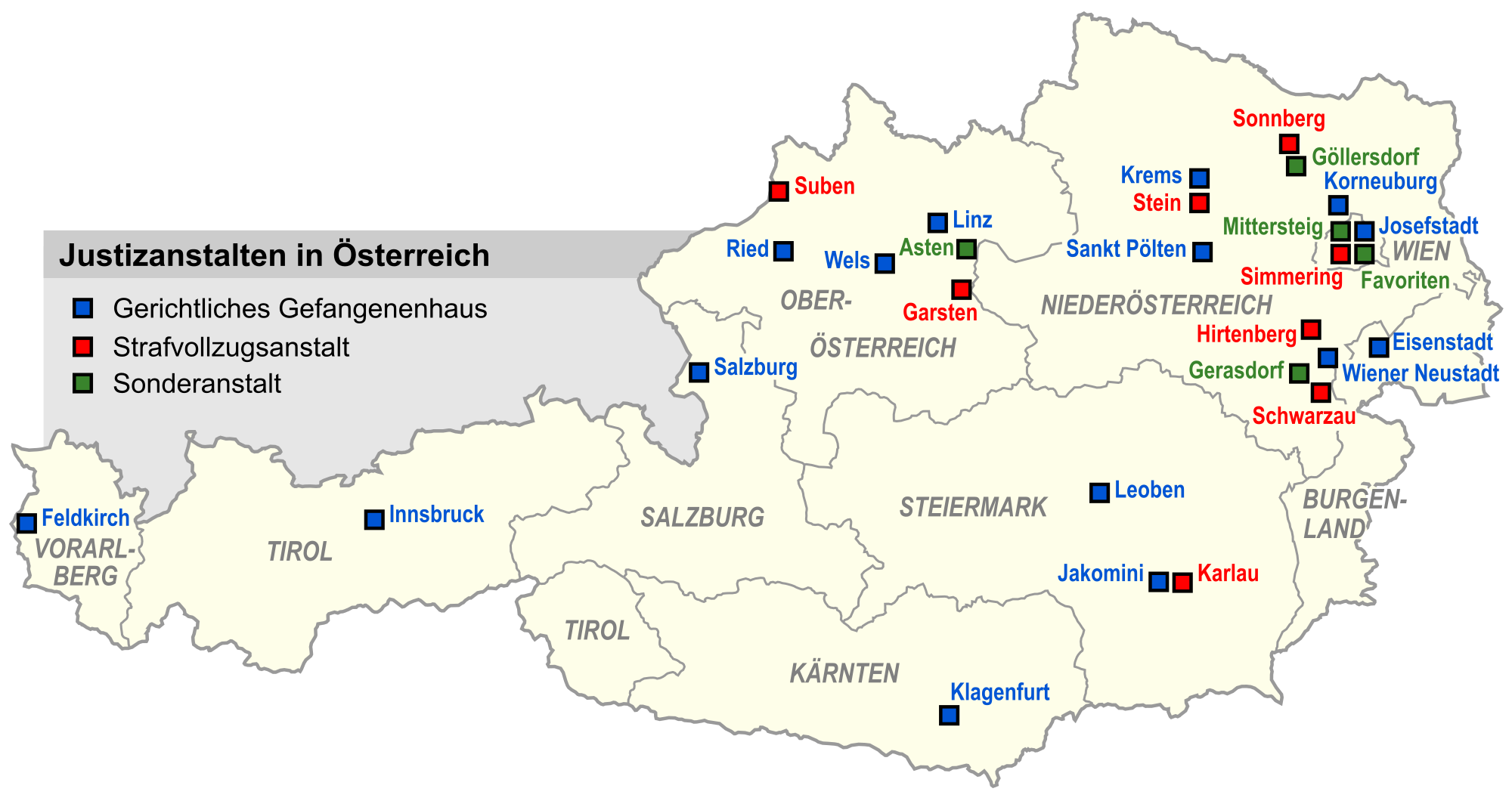
Locations of Austrian Justizanstalten

There are 24 Justizanstalten and four forensic-therapeutic centres throughout Austria, together with 12 attached external branches, some of which are operated as agricultural enterprises. Prisoners may normally be required to work in prison enterprises.

The number of facilities varies by federal state; Lower Austria has the most, with 10 locations. The largest prison in Austria is Josefstadt Prison in Vienna, with a capacity of 1,057, while the smallest is Mittersteig Forensic-Therapeutic Centre with 95 places.

=== Ownership of properties ===
Of the 28 prisons in Austria, 12 are owned directly by the Republic. These include all penal institutions, the special facilities in Gerasdorf, Göllersdorf, and Wien-Mittersteig, and the court prison in Innsbruck. Eight external branches are also federal property. The remaining court prisons and branches are owned by the Bundesimmobiliengesellschaft (BIG), a real-estate company that is itself 100% owned by the Republic of Austria.

=== Planned prisons ===
From 2007 onward the Ministry of Justice planned to spend up to €200 million on renovating and maintaining courts and prisons. This was to include the construction of two new justice centres (combined court and prison complexes). Refurbishments, extensions, and renovations were carried out or planned in Feldkirch, St. Pölten, Krems, Eisenstadt, and Graz.

A new justice centre in Vienna-Baumgasse, originally scheduled for completion in 2010, was to accommodate 230 juvenile prisoners, 90 women, and 100 persons subject to preventive measures, but the project was ultimately abandoned.

The most recently completed new prison is the rebuilt Salzburg Prison in the municipality of Puch bei Hallein, opened in 2015. Plans currently exist to relocate Klagenfurt Prison to a new site outside the city.

== Accommodation regimes ==
Prisoners are normally accommodated in shared cells. Although the Penal Execution Act provides for single-cell accommodation at night, prisoners are usually locked in shared cells overnight for organisational reasons. During the day in normal regime the doors of cells and common areas are generally left unlocked. For special regimes involving prisoners with psychological issues, see the section on forensic-therapeutic centres.

=== Solitary confinement ===
A prisoner may be placed in solitary confinement as a disciplinary measure or at their own request. If the prisoner receives no visits while in solitary confinement, they must be checked at least once a day by a member of the prison guard service. Solitary confinement lasting longer than four weeks requires the approval of the execution court (Vollzugsgericht), which decides on application by the prison governor and also determines the duration. Confinement longer than six weeks requires the prisoner’s explicit request and medical approval.

=== Relaxed Regime ===
With correspondingly good conduct, prisoners in Austria can, within the framework of their custodial sentence, be accommodated in relaxed penal execution. The most common form of such regime relaxation is placement in open prison. In this case, the living areas of the sentenced prisoners are no longer locked, so they can move freely within the prison grounds. Supervision during work can also be limited or waived outside the institution. Another form of regime relaxation can be granted in connection with vocational training outside the Justizanstalt. The prisoner can also be granted two day-releases per month. The decision on relaxed execution always lies with the respective prison governor.

As a special form of regime relaxation, since 2001 certain Justizanstalten have offered the possibility of family contact in specially equipped long-term visiting rooms. In these, sentenced prisoners who would otherwise not be admitted to any regime relaxation can receive their family for an extended period. These detention rooms, referred to as “cuddle cells”, are controversial in public.

=== First-Time Imprisonment ===
If a prisoner is serving a custodial sentence in an Austrian prison for the first time, he must be accommodated separately from the remaining prisoners in first-time execution. Prisoners who have to serve a sentence of more than three years can waive this right. During the day, however, this separation is not provided for; it only affects the cell accommodation of the prisoners. Offenders from whom a harmful influence on fellow prisoners is feared have no right to accommodation in first-time execution.

=== Negligence Offenders Regime ===
Sentenced prisoners who are imprisoned for an offence committed through negligence have a right to separate accommodation. In addition, such prisoners must attend lessons on accident prevention and first-aid courses. This form of accommodation does not apply to prisoners who have already been finally convicted two or more times of an intentionally committed crime.

== House rules ==
Under § 25 StVG every prisoner must receive a copy of the prison’s house rules (also translated into foreign languages) setting out rights and duties. A uniform national version exists, with local variations permitted in an annex.

=== Requests ===
All requests must be submitted in writing using the official form. These are collected on weekdays and then processed. Applications from remand prisoners that concern the outside world must also be approved by the investigating judge, which is why there are two different forms.

Applications are, for example, required for:

* Contact with the Social Service, Psychological Service or chaplain

* Presentation to the doctor

* Visit permission

* Telephone permission

* Permission to visit the library or attend religious services

* Purchase of electrical appliances

* Escort to the deposit office to read telephone numbers from the stored mobile phone

* Transfer to another cell or another detention institution

=== Prison account ===
Trading with staff or other prisoners is prohibited (§ 30 StVG). Prisoners may not possess cash or valuables. All money is managed through a personal prison account with three compartments:

- Own money – cash brought in on admission and external transfers
- House money – wages and rewards
- Reserve – 50 % of wages saved for release

During imprisonment money may be used only for official purchases and telephone costs. Disciplinary fines are deducted from house money. On release the balance is paid out in cash (§ 54 StVG).

=== Work ===
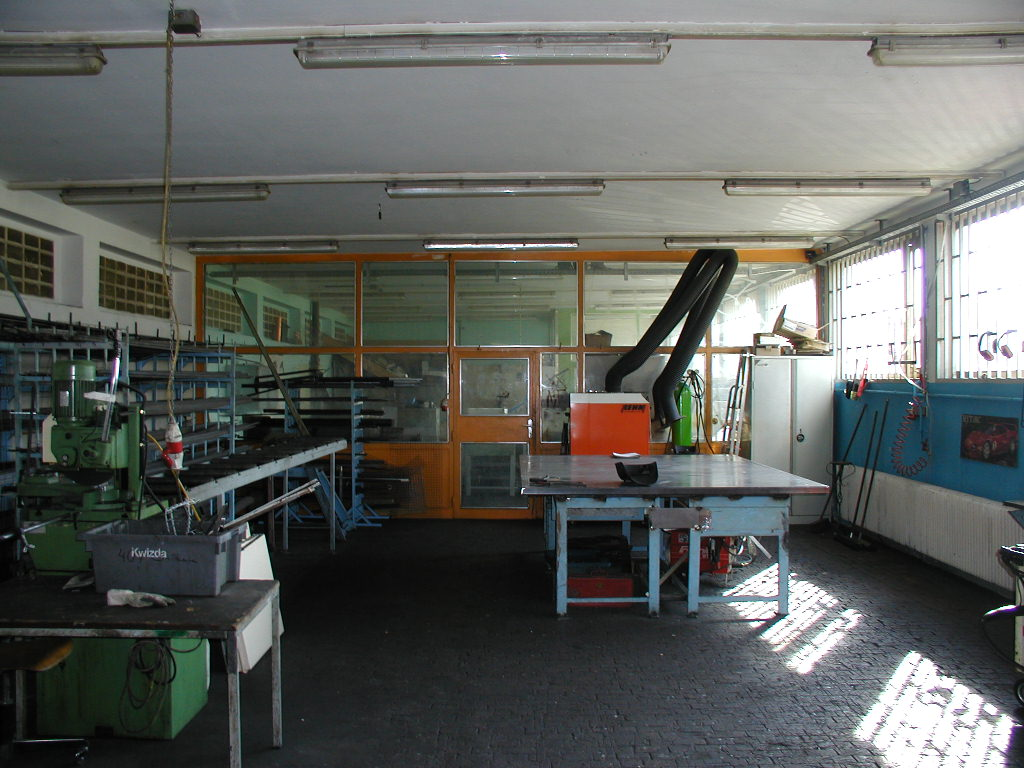
Locksmith workshop at Gerasdorf prison

Sentenced prisoners are, as a rule, obliged to work. This work is remunerated; the hourly rate is between four and six euros (§ 52 StVG). If no workplace can be provided to someone, he receives compensation (unemployment allowance). Pensioners do not have to work. Remand prisoners may work upon application, but receive no compensation if no work is available for them. The work remuneration is credited to the house account as house money and reserve. However, 75% is deducted beforehand from sentenced prisoners as a contribution to the costs of penal execution (§ 32 StVG).

The possible jobs are primarily those that concern the operation of the institution (kitchen, laundry, domestic work, electrician, plumber) and additionally in workshops that are operated depending on the institution (metalworking, motor mechanics, carpentry, car cleaning, contract work). An apprenticeship qualification is often possible there. Institutions and external branches in rural areas also offer agricultural activities.

According to an investigation report by the Court of Audit, the average duration of employment in 2022 was 3.16 hours per working day and prisoner. While the employment rate in rural areas reached up to 94%, it was only 69% in Vienna-Simmering.

=== Canteen ===
Prisoners have, according to § 34 StVG, once a week the possibility of “procuring articles of need”. This purchasing opportunity, also called “Ausspeise”, takes place in a dedicated shop room in the respective institution. Available for purchase are foodstuffs, hygiene articles, stationery and tobacco products. Electrical appliances such as television sets, radios and electric razors may only be acquired after an application to the prison management. Payment is made with the money on the house account, whereby the use of own money, except for the initial purchase, is restricted for sentenced prisoners (§ 91 StVG). After a hostage-taking occurred on 14 November 1996 in the Justizanstalt Graz-Karlau during the Ausspeise, the sales rooms in most Justizanstalten are now secured with bars and waiting areas, and the sale of goods is no longer carried out by external personnel.

=== Clothing ===
On admission prisoners receive prison clothing, bedding and towels. Since 2009 wearing private outer clothing is a general right. A basic private clothing package may be brought in or handed over. Further items require application; court-hearing clothing may be handed in shortly beforehand without application. For certain outdoor work prison clothing (light blue and beige) may be mandated. Private clothing is laundered free of charge weekly.

=== Visits ===
The prisoner must be permitted to receive at least one visit of 30 minutes per week within the visiting hours. In the case of a longer journey by the visitor or longer intervals between visits, the time must be adjusted accordingly. For important personal, economic and legal matters, visits outside visiting hours are also possible.

Depending on the institution, however, at least two visits per week are permitted. Three types are available for this purpose:

* Screen visit: separation by glass pane, conversation via telephone handsets

* Table visit: conversation at a table

* Long-term visit: longer visits in a separate detention room.

Visits by the lawyer are not bound by visiting hours; for this purpose, separate booths are also available in the regional courts. They may not be monitored.

During individual waves of the COVID-19 pandemic, visits were temporarily suspended altogether or only screen visits instead of table visits were permitted. Instead, video conferences via Zoom were offered.

=== Telephone ===
According to § 96a StVG, the inmate must be permitted to make telephone calls for “grounds worthy of consideration”. A general permission for telephone conversations does not comply with the law, but is very often granted as a “privilege”. During the yard walk, the inmate then has the opportunity to make telephone calls. In relaxed regime, this is also possible at other times. Since a conversion in 2015, uniform special telephone sets from the company PKE Electronics AG have been available throughout Austria, which are operated via the private provider Talk2U. Access is gained by entering the inmate number and a PIN. However, only personally approved numbers can be dialled, i.e. up to five telephone numbers are unlocked upon application, lawyer and probation officer are additionally permitted. The credit balance must also be topped up beforehand from the house account. Since the credit is managed directly by the company, it can also be used further if transferred to another institution. Upon release, the payout is made directly by the provider. The call duration is not technically limited. The conversations can be listened to and recorded; an automatic announcement at the beginning of each conversation points this out. The tariffs are approximately twice as high as those otherwise usual. However, this is cheaper than before 2015, when there were three different systems nationwide with value cards or codes that were not interchangeable with each other.

=== Radio and television ===
Prisoners receive headphones for fixed radio stations. In recent years many cells have been equipped with televisions; local, German and some international channels are available via cable with no time limit except night quiet hours.

=== Healthcare ===
Prisoners (including remand prisoners) are not covered by statutory health insurance. Each prison has its own infirmary with doctors and nursing staff, plus contracts with dentists, psychiatrists and psychologists. External hospital, specialist or laboratory treatment is paid by the justice system at private-patient rates. Costs for external psychiatric placements are particularly high. Efforts to insure prisoners have failed. Healthcare costs rose from €74 million in 2014 to €94 million in 2018 after the federal states ceased contributions. Prisoners may consult private doctors at their own expense. Hunger strikes trigger information sessions and daily checks but no force-feeding is permitted.

Prisoners (including remand prisoners) are not covered by health insurance (§ 89 ASVG para. 1–2). The institutions have their own infirmaries with doctors and nursing staff. In addition to general practitioners, there are also contracts with dentists, psychiatrists and psychologists. All other external services at hospitals, specialists and laboratories must be paid for by the justice system, whereby the private-patient tariff applies here. A high amount here is the cost of external accommodation of mentally abnormal offenders. Since no insurance institution is interested in insuring this group of persons, from whom hardly any contributions would be paid, efforts to insure prisoners have failed so far. Even now, the Austrian Health Insurance Fund (Österreichische Gesundheitskasse), which is the most likely candidate, has to insure all groups that cost more than they pay in: the unemployed, asylum seekers, … Before 2013 there was a contribution by the federal states to the costs at public hospitals, which, however, expired in 2014. Since then, costs have risen from 74 million to 94 million in 2018. In addition, there are transport and guarding costs for examinations and treatments at external health service providers. However, the prisoner has the right to consult a private doctor at his own expense (§ 10 AnhO para. 5). If a prisoner goes on hunger strike, information talks and daily examinations are prescribed, but force-feeding is not permitted (§ 10 AnhO para. 4).

== Organisation and oversight ==
All Austrian prisons are subordinate to the Federal Ministry of Justice as the supreme execution authority. Within the Ministry, Section II – Directorate-General for the Execution of Sentences and Measures – is responsible. Additional oversight is exercised by the Austrian Ombudsman Board (Volksanwaltschaft) and various national and international bodies.

=== Directorate-General ===
Until 1 July 2015, the Execution Directorate (officially Directorate for the Execution of Liberty-Depriving Measures) was established as an independent supreme execution authority subordinate to the Federal Ministry of Justice with the power to issue instructions. After a series of incidents in the penal system that cast a negative light on it, Justice Minister Wolfgang Brandstetter finally decided to reintegrate the supreme execution authority into the Ministry of Justice. The newly created Directorate-General for the Execution of Sentences and the Execution of Liberty-Depriving Measures is now a section of the Federal Ministry of Justice and also performs the tasks previously assigned by the Penal Execution Act to the supreme execution authority. It is the highest instance for decisions under execution law and regulates almost all areas of the individual Justizanstalten. It is equally responsible for the construction and maintenance of the prisons as for their proper operation. A large number of decisions fall to it, ranging from sanctions against prisoners to day-release prisoners up to the release of prisoners. For this purpose, the Directorate-General is divided into four departments that are separated from each other according to strategic and operational orientations.

=== Enforcement divisions ===
The regional court (Landesgericht) located at the seat of the higher regional court (Oberlandesgericht) in whose district the sentence is being executed decides by means of an execution senate (Art. StVG § 18 Act of (in German) on complaints of sentenced prisoners (Art. StVG § 16 Act of (in German). The execution senates are composed of two professional judges, one of whom presides, and one prison officer as an expert lay judge. The expert lay judges are appointed by the Federal Minister of Justice on the proposal of the President of the Higher Regional Court for a period of six years.

Against decisions of the Ministry of Justice in matters of penal execution as well as against decisions of the execution senates of the regional courts, an appeal to the Vienna Higher Regional Court is admissible (Art. StVG § 16 Act of (in German), which thereby assumes nationwide jurisdiction. The Vienna Higher Regional Court also decides by means of an execution senate consisting of one professional judge and two prison officers.

Until 31 December 2013, the tasks of the execution senates were performed by independent administrative authorities, the so-called execution chambers (Vollzugskammern), which likewise had a professional judge as chairman. These execution chambers, however, had to be dissolved due to the abolition of the administrative chain of appeal associated with the Administrative Jurisdiction Reform Act 2012.

=== Ombudsman Board and other oversight bodies ===
For the external monitoring of compliance with human rights in the judicial penal system, the Ombudsman Board (Volksanwaltschaft) is responsible; for this purpose it has established a Human Rights Advisory Council and regional commissions attached to it. These commissions can, on behalf of the Ombudsman Board, examine the conditions at any time in all institutions in which persons are detained against their will by state authority. The Ombudsman Board must report annually to Parliament on the results of these examinations.

In addition, there is the European Committee for the Prevention of Torture and Inhuman or Degrading Treatment or Punishment, an international organisation for the prevention of torture. This has visited Austrian detention facilities six times to date, most recently in September 2014. Numerous other non-governmental organisations, such as Amnesty International, also regularly monitor conditions in Austrian prisons.

== Statistics ==
Prisoners per 100,000 inhabitants
Statistics as of March 1, 2008
Development of passenger numbers
From 1997 to 2007

In the whole of Austria, 8,354 persons were in custody in January 2020, which corresponds to approximately 0.1% of the total Austrian population. On the reference date of 1 January 2019, there were 8,354 prisoners (including remand prisoners) for a total of 8,616 prison places. 5,907 inmates were serving custodial sentences (of whom 440 were female and 311 were under electronically monitored house arrest), 1,742 were in pre-trial detention. Previously, in July 2009 there had still been about 8,400 prisoners; in the spring of 2008, by contrast, more than 8,600 persons were detained in Austrian prisons. The main reason for this short-term decline in prisoner numbers was probably the prison decongestion package that entered into force at the beginning of 2008, which made it possible to have around 900 fewer persons in custody compared to the same period of the previous year (8,044 prisoners in July 2008; 8,973 prisoners in July 2007).

In 2019, 4,290 (46%) of the inmates were Austrian nationals, 1,682 (18%) were other EU citizens and 3,357 (36%) were third-country nationals.

The proportion of sentenced prisoners with a prison term of up to one year is 40%, that of one to five years 46%, 15% have to serve custodial sentences lasting more than five years. The highest penalty that an Austrian court can impose on a person is, according to § 18 Criminal Code, life imprisonment. On the reference date of 1 November 2019, 204 persons were serving a life sentence in Austrian prisons. On average, prisoners sentenced to “life” are conditionally released on probation after 21 years. However, there are also offenders who are kept in custody for far longer, as the case of Harald Sassak proves, who served a life sentence from 1974 until shortly before his death in 2013. As a rule, such prisoners with very long custodial sentences are accommodated in the penal institutions Graz-Karlau, Stein or Garsten. Female prisoners with life sentences are generally held in the Justizanstalt Schwarzau.

=== Staff and Budget ===
In total, around 4,000 employees were working in the Austrian Justizanstalten in 2019. 81% of them were Justizwache officers, i.e. they worked as supervisory and care personnel for the prisoners. 671 of them belonged to the Justizwache Einsatzgruppe, a special unit of the Austrian prison guard service.

In 2019, there were also 80 social workers, 57 doctors, 66 psychologists and psychotherapists as well as 14 educators employed in the Austrian penal system. The number of employed doctors increased by about 20% from 1997 to 2007, and the total number of employees by about 25%. At the same time, however, the total number of prisoners also rose continuously. At the beginning of the 1990s, around 6,800 persons were still imprisoned in Austria; in the following years the prisoner numbers rose rapidly until finally in 2019 more than 8,350 persons were accommodated in the Justizanstalten.

The expenditure for the penal system amounted to around 518 million euros in 2019 (of which 228 million personnel costs, 250 million material costs and 40 million for probation assistance). Through the work service in the Justizanstalten, additional revenue of 62 million euros could be generated (execution cost contributions, income from the sale of products and services, contributions from the federal states). The average costs for one day of imprisonment therefore amount to approx. 130 euros, whereby the preventive measures regime (Maßnahmenvollzug) is considerably more expensive, especially if placement in psychiatric hospitals takes place.

Since prisoners are not covered by health insurance, the treatment costs also have to be paid from the justice budget. In 2018 these amounted to around 95 million euros.

=== Escapes and escape attempts ===
In recent years, the number of escapes and escape attempts in Austria has fallen sharply. In the case of flights from the Justizanstalten, a distinction is made between breakouts (from the closed area), abscondings (from the non-closed area, from open regime or from an escorted outing) and non-returns from a regime relaxation. Whereas in the mid-1990s up to 50 breakouts per year were still recorded, today there are hardly any successful escape attempts. An exception to this declining statistic is the year 2005, in which 17 persons managed to escape from an Austrian prison. The reason for the decrease is the increasing modernisation of security technology in the Justizanstalten.

In contrast to some other countries, the escape of a prisoner from penal custody is not a criminal offence in Austria. A prison escape can therefore only result in an internal disciplinary penalty for the prisoner. However, anyone who frees or attempts to free a prisoner commits the offence of releasing prisoners under Art. STGB § 300 Act of (in German), unless they themselves are a prisoner.

=== Suicides and suicide attempts ===
On average, up to 15 prisoners take their own lives in Austrian Justizanstalten every year. Suicide is an issue among prisoners serving multi-year sentences, but also among remand prisoners and (not counted here) persons in detention pending deportation. From 1947 to 1999 there were 410 documented suicides in the Austrian penal system. Experts suspect that the main cause of most suicides is the high level of stress, especially among new arrivals. In half of all completed suicides, a previous attempt had been made; in 37 percent of cases, an explicit announcement had preceded the suicide.

Between 2018 and 2022, however, the number of suicides declined. There were still twelve in 2018, nine in 2019, eight in 2020 and only six in 2022. Only the pandemic year 2021, with its contact restrictions, was an outlier with 15 cases. Afterwards, the figures deteriorated rapidly: there were 60 cases in 2024 and already 40 by September 2025.

For prevention, the VISCI (Viennese Instrument for Suicidality in Correctional Institutions) is used. This has a traffic-light system for the current risk level. If a prisoner expresses suicidal thoughts, he receives the status VISCI red (high danger, no solitary confinement or video surveillance, presentation to the psychiatrist) or VISCI yellow (danger, no solitary confinement or prolonged time alone). The imposition of measures and the downgrading of the traffic-light colour are the responsibility of the psychiatrist. The VISCI status is also displayed on the cell door. The measures range from placement in a special detention room (padded cell), video surveillance in dedicated cells (no cables, no cutlery, no crockery, etc.) to a prohibition on being alone in the cell for extended periods.

“Self-injury” is expressly prohibited under § 27 StVG.
