= Schlins =

- Municipality
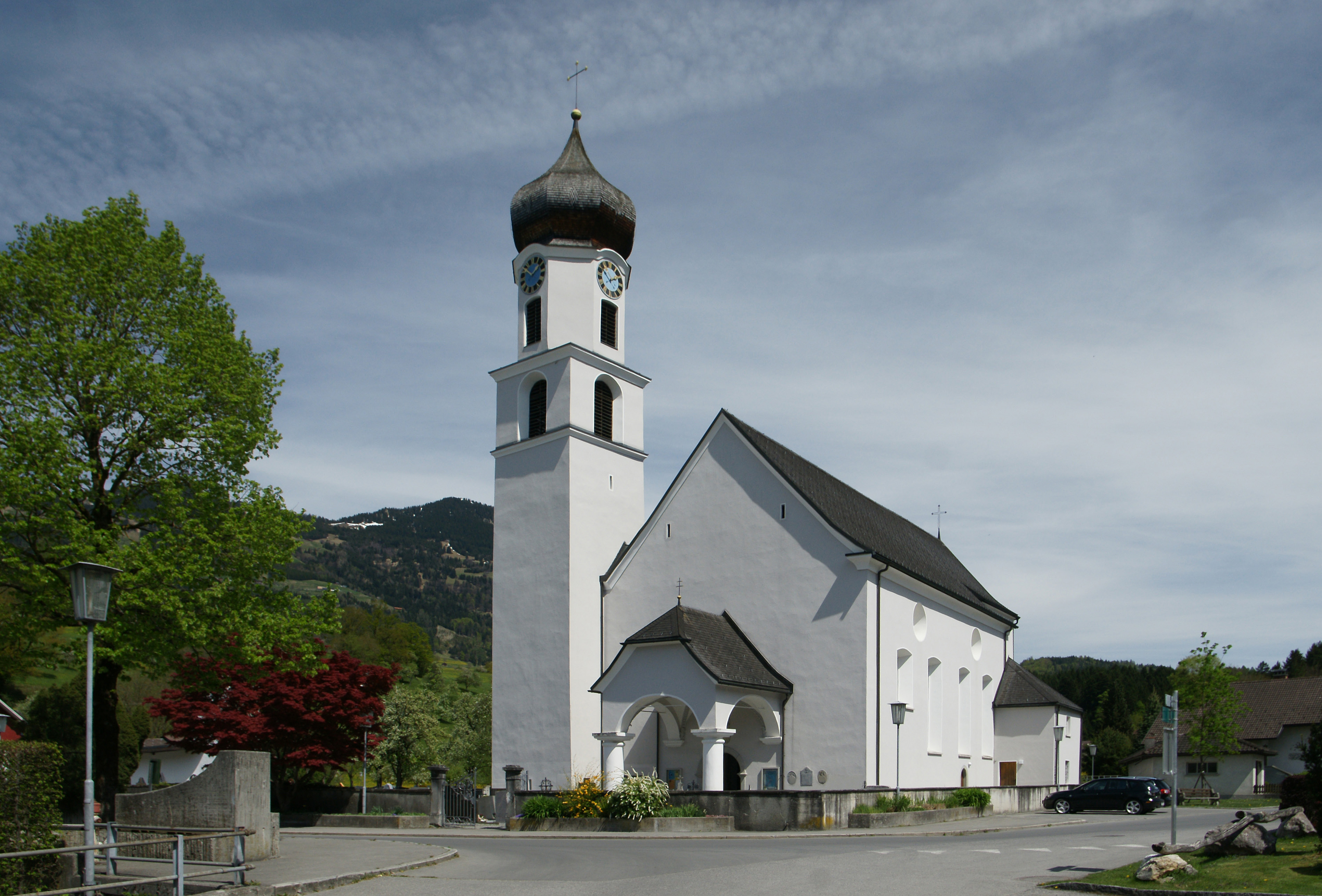

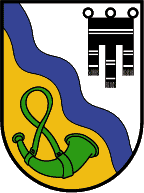
- Coat of arms

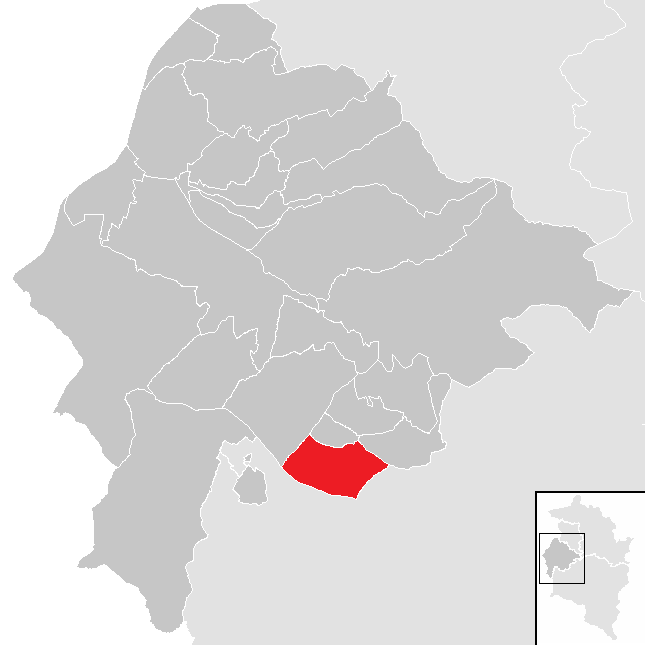
- Location in the district

- Location within Austria
- Coordinates: 47°12′00″N 09°41′00″E
- Country: Austria
- State: Vorarlberg
- District: Feldkirch

Government
  - Mayor: Gabriele Mähr (ÖVP)

Area
  - Total: 6.06 km^{2} (2.34 sq mi)
- Elevation: 502 m (1,647 ft)

Population (2018-01-01)
  - Total: 2,404
  - Density: 397/km^{2} (1,030/sq mi)
- Time zone: UTC+1 (CET)
  - Summer (DST): UTC+2 (CEST)
- Postal code: 6824
- Area code: 05524
- Vehicle registration: FK
- Website: www.schlins.at

Schlins is a municipality in the district of Feldkirch in the Austrian state of Vorarlberg.

== Population ==
Historical population
Year	Pop.	±%
1869	523	—
1880	547	+4.6%
1890	512	−6.4%
1900	663	+29.5%
1910	695	+4.8%
1923	681	−2.0%
1934	821	+20.6%
1939	794	−3.3%
1951	1,044	+31.5%
1961	1,285	+23.1%
1971	1,554	+20.9%
1981	1,723	+10.9%
1991	1,777	+3.1%
2001	2,043	+15.0%
2011	2,289	+12.0%

== Transport ==
Schlins-Beschling railway station is an intermediate station on the Vorarlberg railway line (Vorarlbergbahn) traversing Vorarlberg in a north-south direction. The railway station is called at by the S1 regional train service of Vorarlberg S-Bahn, operated by Austrian Federal Railways (ÖBB).
