= Europe bridge =

Europe bridge is the name of several bridges in Europe :

- In Austria as Europabrücke
  - Europabrücke, a bridge over the Wipp valley (1963), highest bridge in Europe until 2004 and Millau Viaduct achievement
- In Belgium as Pont de l'Europe
  - Pont de l'Europe in Huy, over the Meuse (1980) see;
- In Bulgaria and Romania
  - New Europe Bridge, over the Danube between Vidin in Bulgaria and Calafat in Romania (2013)
- In France as Pont de l'Europe
  - Pont de l'Europe in Orléans, over the Loire (built in 2000);
  - Pont de l'Europe in Vichy, a dam-bridge over the Allier (1963) see;
  - Pont de l'Europe in Avignon over the Rhône (1975) see;
  - Pont de l'Europe between Strasbourg (France) and Kehl (Germany) over the Rhine (1953)
- In Germany as Europabrücke
  - Europabrücke in Koblenz over the Moselle (1974);
  - Europabrücke in Frankfurt am Main carrying Bundesautobahn 5 over the Main (1978);
  - Europabrücke in Hamburg over the Süderelbe (1983);
  - Europabrücke in Kehl and Strasbourg (France); see France
  - Europabrücke in Kelheim over the Danube;
- In Romania, the New Europe Bridge connecting to Bulgaria
- In Switzerland as Europabrücke
  - Europabrücke in Zürich
  - Europabrücke in Randa, Switzerland, replaced in 2017 by Charles Kuonen Bridge
