= Mils, Tyrol =

Mils
- Municipality
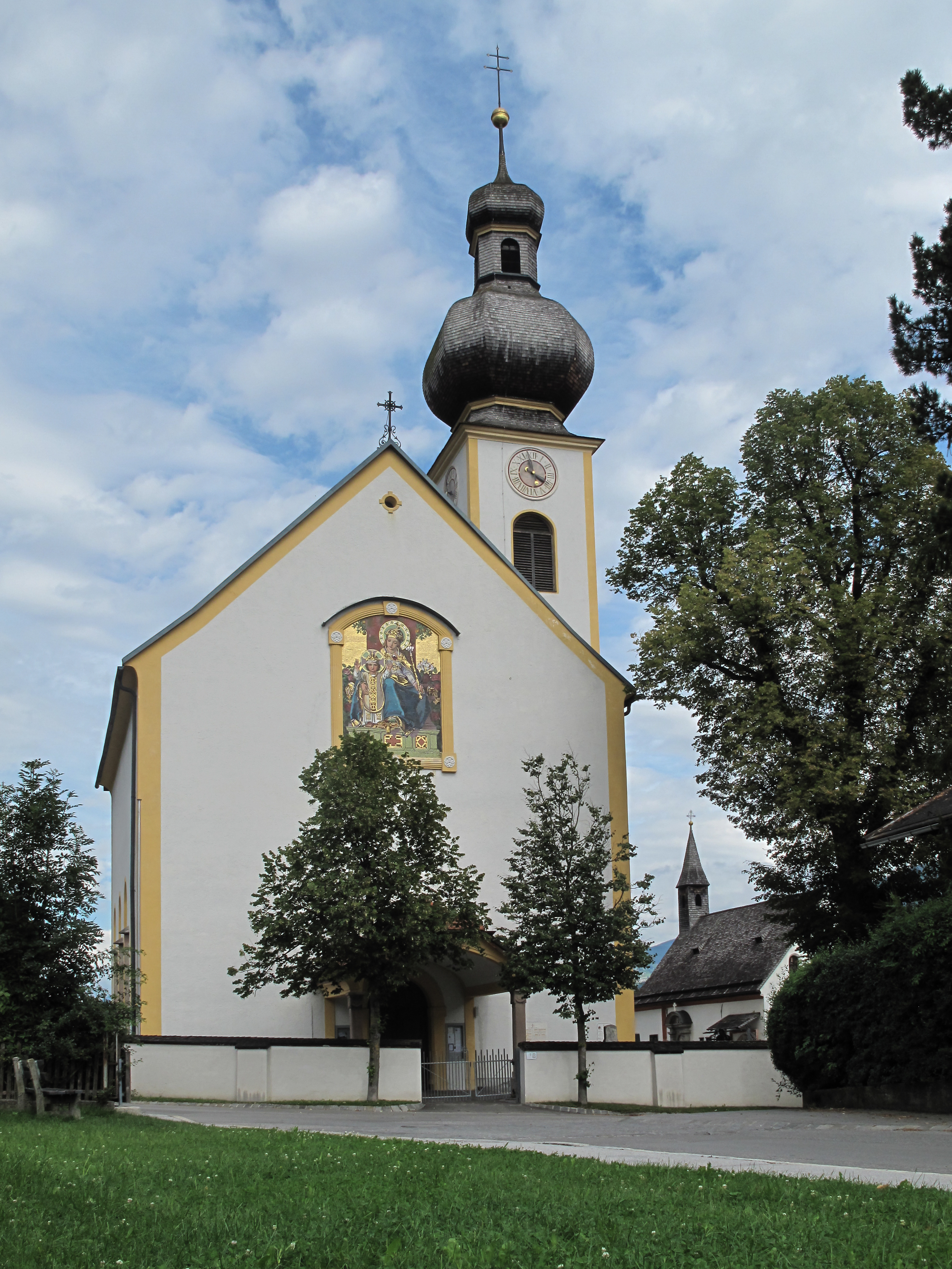

- Coat of arms

- Location within Austria
- Coordinates: 47°17′11″N 11°31′36″E
- Country: Austria
- State: Tyrol
- District: Innsbruck Land

Government
  - Mayor: Daniela Kampfl (KAMPFL)

Area
  - Total: 6.92 km^{2} (2.67 sq mi)
- Elevation: 605 m (1,985 ft)

Population (2021)
  - Total: 4,549
  - Density: 657/km^{2} (1,700/sq mi)
- Time zone: UTC+1 (CET)
  - Summer (DST): UTC+2 (CEST)
- Postal code: 6068
- Area code: 05223
- Vehicle registration: IL
- Website: www.mils-tirol.at

Mils is a municipality in the district Innsbruck-Land of Tyrol, Austria. It is located 12 km east of Innsbruck. The area is restricted by the Weißenbach in the west and the Inn in the south. The location was mentioned in documents in 930 for the first time. In the last 40 years Mils grew enormously thanks to its sunny location.

== Population ==
Historical population
Year	Pop.	±%
1869	470	—
1880	551	+17.2%
1890	576	+4.5%
1900	565	−1.9%
1910	777	+37.5%
1923	803	+3.3%
1934	866	+7.8%
1939	895	+3.3%
1951	965	+7.8%
1961	1,101	+14.1%
1971	2,012	+82.7%
1981	3,053	+51.7%
1991	3,670	+20.2%
2001	3,798	+3.5%
2011	4,151	+9.3%
