= Mieming =

- Municipality
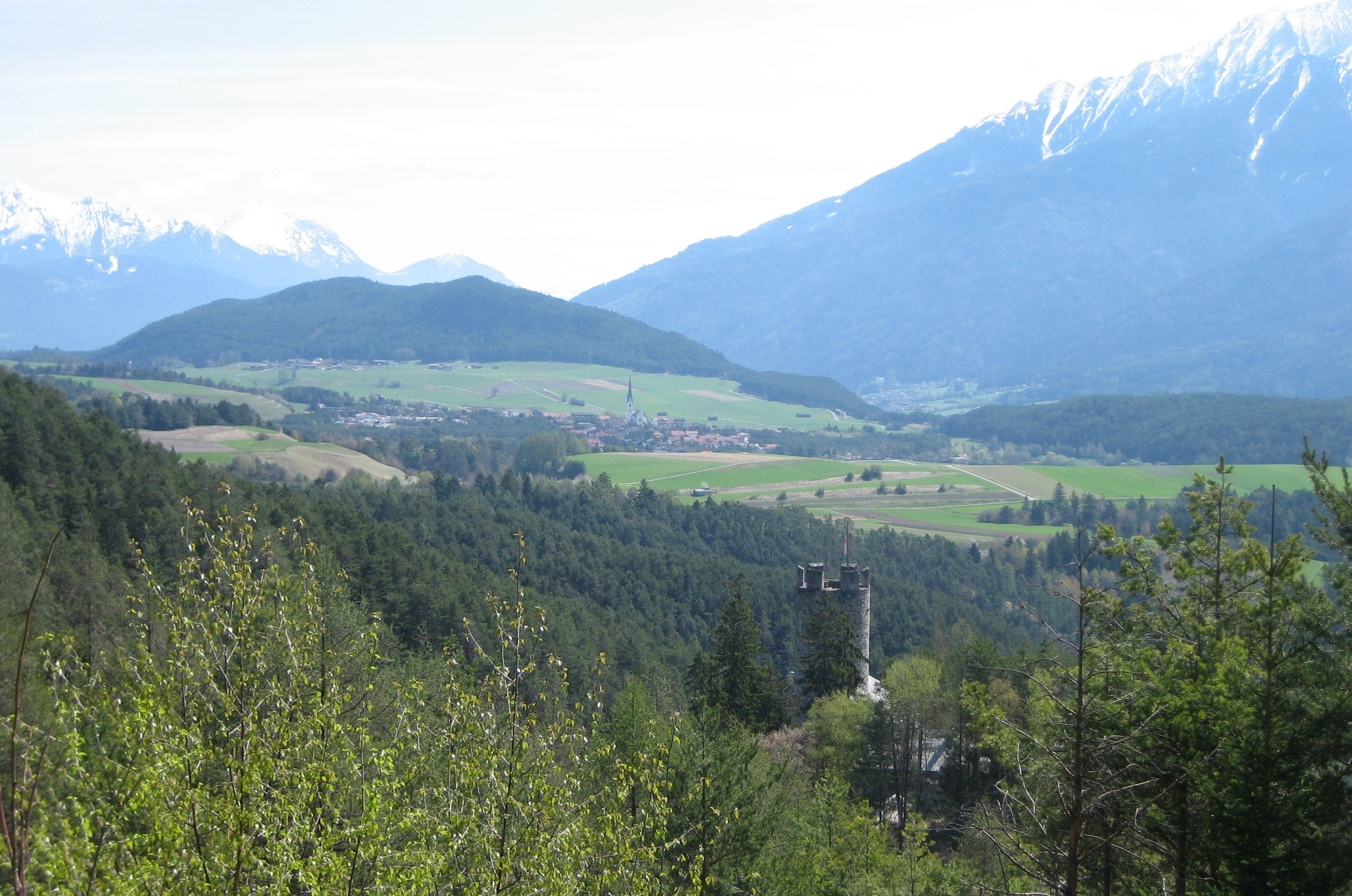

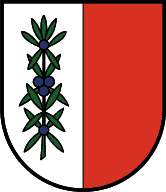
- Coat of arms

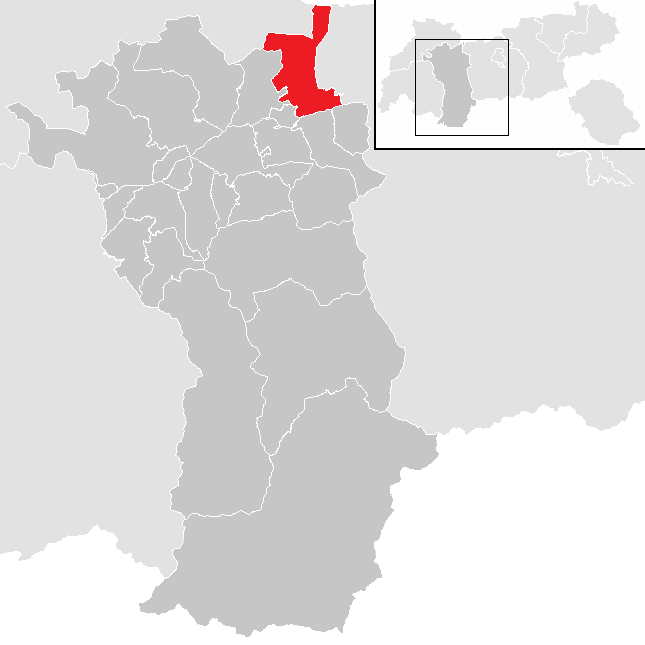
- Location in the district

- Location within Austria
- Coordinates: 47°18′00″N 10°59′00″E
- Country: Austria
- State: Tyrol
- District: Imst

Government
  - Mayor: Martin Kapeller

Area
  - Total: 50.4 km^{2} (19.5 sq mi)
- Elevation: 864 m (2,835 ft)

Population (2021)
  - Total: 3,828
  - Density: 76.0/km^{2} (197/sq mi)
- Time zone: UTC+1 (CET)
  - Summer (DST): UTC+2 (CEST)
- Postal code: 6414
- Area code: 0 52 64
- Vehicle registration: IM
- Website: www.mieming.tirol.gv.at

Mieming (German pronunciation: [ˈmiə̯mɪŋ]) is a municipality in the Imst district and is located 19 km east of Imst and 6 km west of Telfs. Main sources of income are agriculture and Summer tourism.

== Population ==
Historical population
Year	Pop.	±%
1869	1,078	—
1880	1,026	−4.8%
1890	913	−11.0%
1900	899	−1.5%
1910	888	−1.2%
1923	963	+8.4%
1934	1,090	+13.2%
1939	1,105	+1.4%
1951	1,219	+10.3%
1961	1,274	+4.5%
1971	1,450	+13.8%
1981	1,771	+22.1%
1991	2,202	+24.3%
2001	2,881	+30.8%
2011	3,445	+19.6%
