= The Last Valley =

The Last Valley may refer to:

- The Last Valley (novel), an historical novel about the Thirty Years' War
  - The Last Valley (film), a 1971 film adaptation of the novel directed by James Clavell
