= Gschnitzbach =

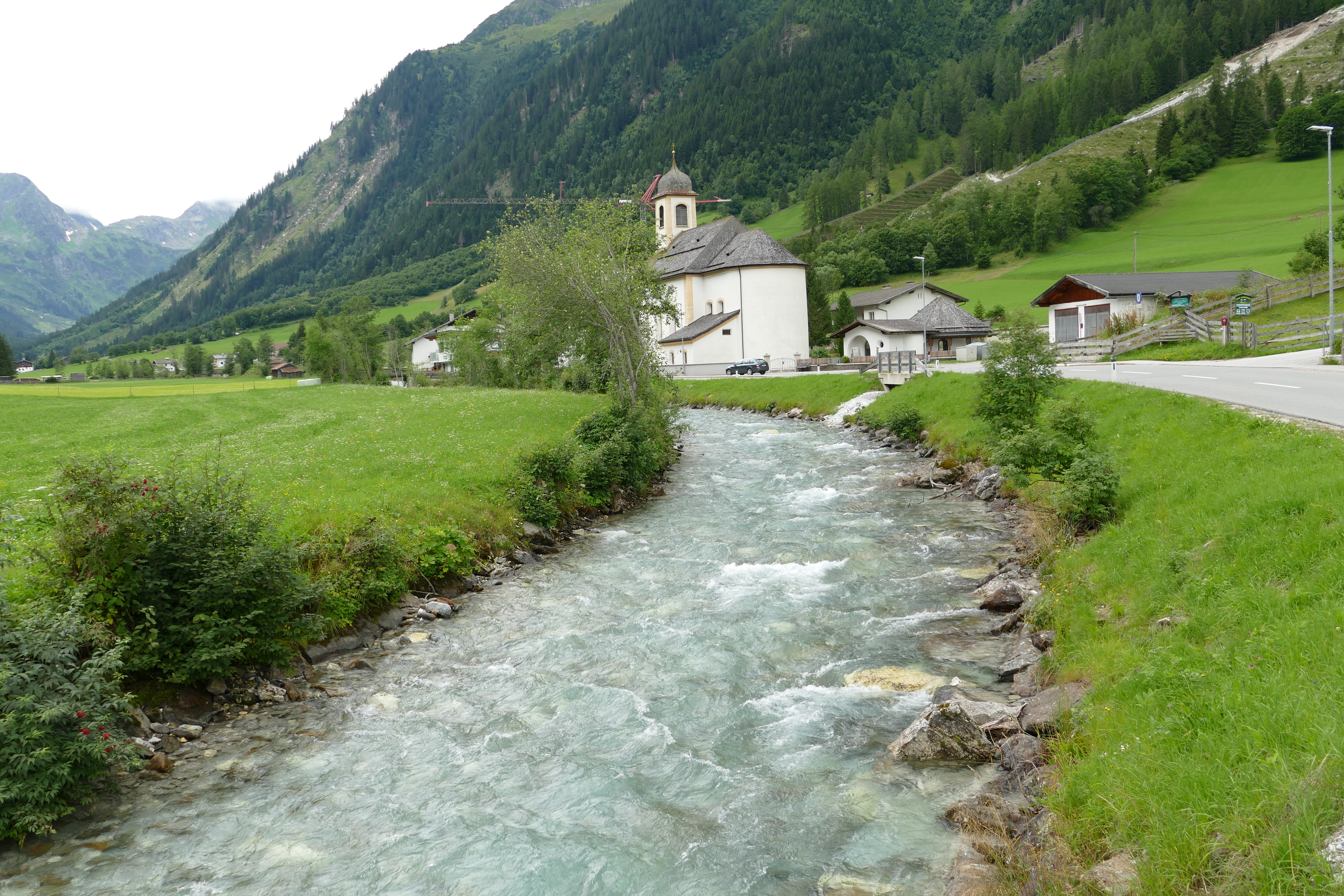
- The Geschnitzbach in Gschnitz

Location
- Country: Austria
- State: Tyrol

Physical characteristics
- Source
  - location: out of the lake Lauterersee
- Mouth
  - location: into the Sill at Steinach am Brenner
  - coordinates: 47.0940°N 11.4672°E
- Length: ~ 20 km (12 mi)

Basin features
- Progression: Sill→ Inn→ Danube→ Black Sea

The Gschnitzbach is a river of Tyrol, Austria.

The Gschnitzbach springs from the lake Lauterersee in the Stubai Alps. It flows from South to North and merges with the Sill at Steinach am Brenner. It has a length of about 20 kilometres (12 mi) and passes through the villages of Trins and Gschnitz.

The water quality of the Gschnitzbach is A grade and remains very clear until the mouth. It provides a good living space for fishes. The water is also used for drinking water supply for the villages nearby.

The river may look like a silent water upstream, but quickly turns into a rapid-river spiked with several dangerous chutes in its lower course.
