= Lichtsee =

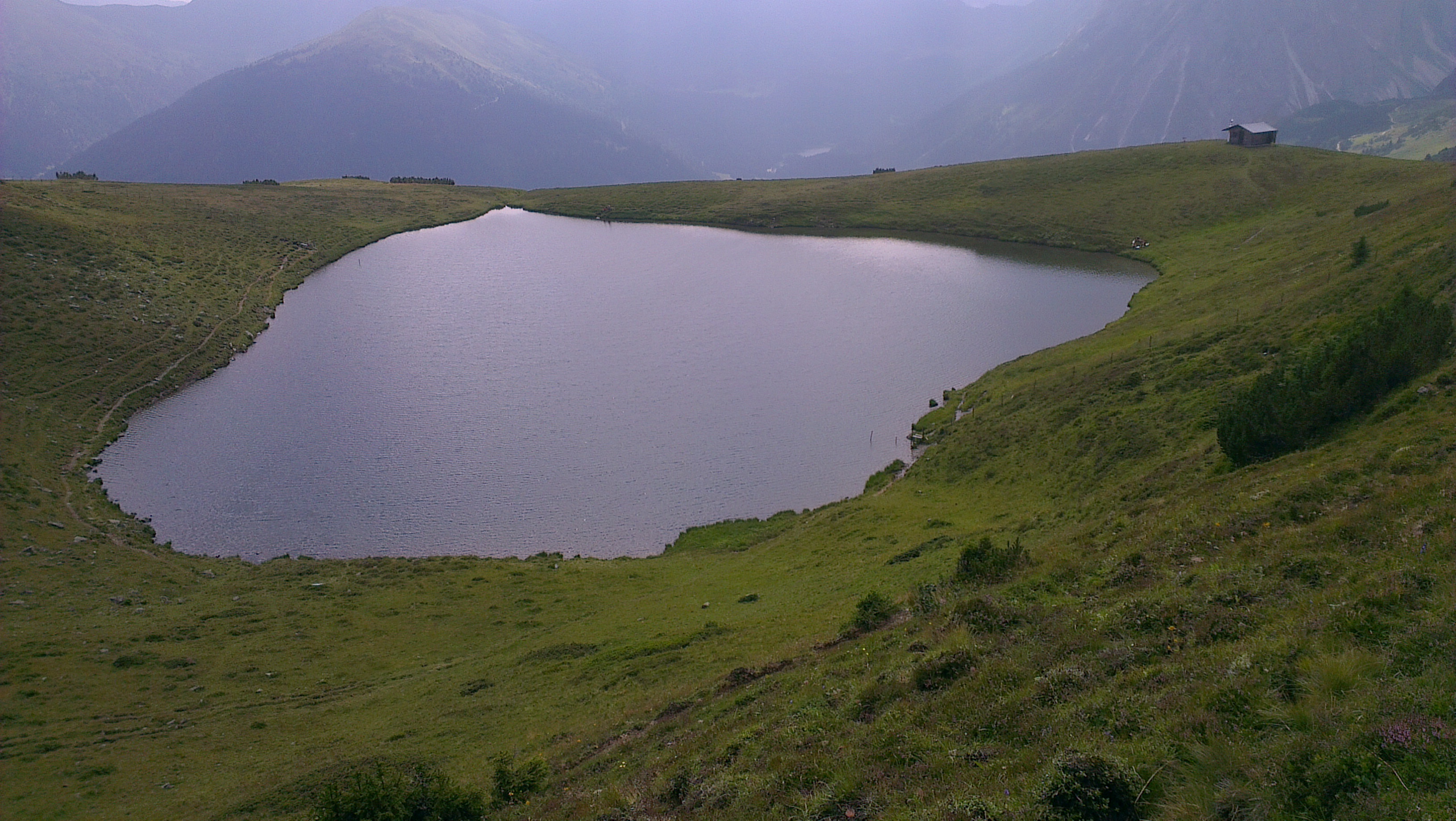
- The lake of light in Obernberg

- Location within Tyrol, Austria
- Location: Stubaier Alps, Tyrol
- Coordinates: 47°1′53″N 11°24′20″E
- Lake type: Mountain lake
- Basin countries: Austria
- Surface area: 3.93 ha (9.7 acres)
- Surface elevation: 2,100 m (6,900 ft)
- Settlements: Obernberg am Brenner

Lichtsee is a lake in Tyrol, Austria. It lies northern above the village Obernberg am Brenner on 2.100 metres above sea level. It can only be reached on foot from the village. With an area size of 3.93 ha it is one of the bigger lakes at such a high altitude.

Due to its protected location, the Lake possesses excellent water quality (A Grade). In hot summers the lake is appealing because it hardly warms up to more than 14 °C. On the southern shore, blueberries and cranberries grow. Several types of trout live in the water. Rain and melting of snow are the lake's only sources of water.

== See also ==
- Rohrsee
