= Brennero =

Brennero may refer to:

- Brenner, South Tyrol, a municipality in Italy
- Brenner Pass
