= The Last Valley (film) =

1971 film directed by James Clavell

- US film poster
- Directed by: James Clavell
- Written by: James Clavell
- Based on: The Last Valley by J.B. Pick
- Produced by: James Clavell
- Starring: Michael Caine; Omar Sharif; Florinda Bolkan; Nigel Davenport; Per Oscarsson
- Cinematography: John Wilcox
- Edited by: John Bloom
- Music by: John Barry
- Production companies: Season Productions; ABC Pictures Corporation
- Distributed by: Cinerama Releasing Corporation
- Release dates: 28 January 1971 (USA); 8 April 1971 (London)
- Running time: 128 minutes
- Countries: United Kingdom; United States
- Language: English
- Budget: $6,250,000
- Box office: $1,280,000

The Last Valley is a 1971 film written and directed by James Clavell, an historical drama set during the Thirty Years' War (1618–1648). While war ravages in the southern principalities of the Holy Roman Empire, a mercenary leader (Michael Caine) and a teacher (Omar Sharif) stumble upon a valley untouched by the war. Based upon the novel The Last Valley (1959), by J.B. Pick, the cinematic version of The Last Valley was the final feature film photographed with the Todd-AO 70 mm widescreen process, until it was revived to make the film Baraka in 1991.

== Plot ==
It's the year 1643 AD. A German mercenary and leader, named "The Captain", leads his company who fight for whoever will pay them, regardless of religion. His soldiers pillage the countryside, raping and looting when not fighting. During their campaigns, they encounter Vogel, a former teacher trying to survive the fighting and resulting chaos in south-central Germany. Vogel runs from the Captain's force, and eventually stumbles upon an idyllic mountain valley, untouched by war. Vogel convinces the Captain to preserve the village so it can shelter the band through the coming winter, as the outside world faces famine, plague and the devastation of war. The Captain agrees, but kills Korski, one of his own men, without warning when the latter objects to the idea of desertion. The local headman, Gruber, submits, after obtaining the best terms he can.

The local Catholic priest is livid that the mercenaries include a number of Protestants (and nihilistic atheists for that matter), but there is nothing he can do to sway the Captain. The Captain kills several dissenting members of his band, to uphold their pledge to set aside religious divisions. Elsewhere, the locals accept their fate. The Captain and Gruber agree to appoint Vogel as judge, to settle disputes between villagers and soldiers. As long as food, shelter and a small number of women are provided, the mercenaries leave the locals alone.

The Captain takes Gruber's wife, Erica, for himself. Hansen (one of the soldiers) attempts to rape a girl. When Vogel stops him, he and two others try, but fail to kill the Captain. They flee, but return with a larger mercenary band, before the winter closes the valley to outsiders. However, the Captain has anticipated this, and Hansen and his band are destroyed. From the first peddler to enter the valley in the spring, the Captain learns of a major military campaign in the Upper Rhineland and decides to seek employment with Bernard of Saxe-Weimar. Vogel wants to accompany him, fearing Gruber will have him killed once the Captain leaves. However, the Captain orders Vogel to stay as the condition of not sacking the village, leaving Geddes and Pirelli behind as guards.

After the Captain departs, the priest catches Erica praying to Satan to keep the Captain safe. The priest has her tortured and condemned to be burned at the stake. Vogel demands of the priest why, when she had confessed, and the priest replies that it was to drive the Devil out of her: "She's truly saved". To spare her further suffering, Vogel volunteers to tie her up, so he can secretly knife her just before her body is consigned to the flames. Enraged, Geddes pushes the priest into the fire and holds him there, killing them both. Meanwhile, the Captain and his men fight in a night assault on a fortified city. He returns to the valley with the only other survivor of his band. Vogel tries to warn him, but the Captain rides into an ambush set by Gruber. The Captain, however, is dying of his wounds, so there is no fighting. He tells Vogel: "You were right. I was wrong". Inge, a young woman who has fallen in love with Vogel, wants to leave with him, but he tells her to stay and walks off alone.

== Cast ==
- Michael Caine as The Captain
- Omar Sharif as Vogel
- Florinda Bolkan as Erica
- Nigel Davenport as Gruber
- Per Oscarsson as Father Sebastian
- Arthur O'Connell as Hoffman
- Madeleine Hinde as Inge
- Yorgo Voyagis as Pirelli
- Vladek Sheybal as Matthias
- Miguel Alejandro as Julio
- Christian Roberts as Andreas
- Brian Blessed as Korski
- Ian Hogg as Graf
- Michael Gothard as Hansen
- George Innes as Vornez
- John Hallam as Geddes
- Leon Lissek as Czeraki
- Frazer Hines as Corg

== Production ==
=== Development ===
The novel was published in 1960. The New York Times called it "oddly compelling". The Chicago Tribune called it "a strange and memorable book."

In July 1967 it was announced that James Clavell, then enjoying success with the release of the film To Sir With Love and the book Tai-Pan, would adapt the book into a screenplay and direct a film adaptation for the Mirisch Corporation.

In November 1968 it was announced Clavell would make the film for ABC Pictures. The head of ABC was Martin Baum who was Clavell's agent and who had helped put together To Sir, with Love.

Clavell was going to make the film after The Great Siege, a story of the Siege of Malta, which he was going to do after Where's Jack? (1967). He ended up not making Great Siege. Before making The Last Valley, he said he would write another book afterwards, "to see if I've still got it". (This would become Shogun.)

Omar Sharif was the first star to sign. By June 1969, Michael Caine had also signed on. At one stage, the film was going to be called Somewhere in the Mountains, There is a Last Valley. It had the biggest budget of any picture, made to that point, by ABC Pictures. Caine was paid $750,000, Sharif $600,000.

Clavell cast much of the supporting cast from British rep companies.

=== Shooting ===
Filming started 25 August 1969 in Austria.

The film was mostly shot in Tyrol, Austria (Trins and Gschnitz and the Gschnitztal Valley). Actor Martin Miller collapsed and died on the set before shooting of the first scene commenced.

Caine played a German. He later said, "I thought that the obvious trap was to play a German like a man trying to do a German accent; so I decided to play my character like a German trying to speak perfect English. I hired dialect records and listened to them non-stop for a few days. Then I put it out of my mind and tried to speak good English but with a German’s basic speech pattern."

It was the first film for Brian Blessed who recalled it "was a happy experience for everyone involved. The director and his management were inordinately kind to us, doing everything in their power to make us comfortable."

In October 1970 Clavell said he had been working on the film for three years. "I imagine that if I'd come along with the project six months later, it wouldn't have been made at all. By then the financial rot had set in." (A proposed film of his novel Tai Pan had been cancelled due to its cost.)

== Reception ==
=== Box office ===
Caine later said: "I knew pretty well as soon as we finished filming that it wasn't going to work at the box office." The film was one of the most popular movies at the British box office in 1971. However, it was an expensive failure overall. It earned rentals of $380,000 in North America and $900,000 in other countries; after deducting distribution costs it recorded an overall loss of $7,185,000.

Caine later wrote in his memoirs: "I liked this film very much, but it was not a success, due mainly I think to problems of timing. We were in the midst of the Vietnam War, and here was a story about the Hundred Year War in Germany, set in the Middle Ages."

=== Critical ===
The Monthly Film Bulletin called it "unexpectedly terse, elegant and intelligent."

Art Murphy of Variety said it was "disappointing" and faced "an uphill fight for domestic general audience attention". The Evening Standard called it "an excellent advertisement for the Tyrolean Tourist Board."

With its setting in the Thirty Years' War, it dealt with a historical period seldom depicted on film. In this light, George MacDonald Fraser wrote in 1988: "The plot left me bewildered – in fact, the whole bloody business is probably an excellent microcosm of the Thirty Years' War, with no clear picture of what is happening and half the cast ending up dead to no purpose. To that extent, it must be rated a successful film. ... As a drama, The Last Valley is not remarkable; as a reminder of what happened in Central Europe, 1618-48, and shaped the future of Germany, it reads an interesting lesson." Fraser says of the stars: "Michael Caine ... gives one of his best performances as the hard-bitten mercenary captain, nicely complemented by Omar Sharif as the personification of reason."

Caine called it "the most disappointing picture I ever made. Disappointing not from the finished picture, but the reaction to it. It is a performance of which I’m particularly proud, one of the best performances I ever gave, as a matter of fact. For a start, it was anti-religious war at the time of Northern Ireland. I did the film to show what I felt about all the religions. But, it meant absolutely nothing to the public, the critics were extremely unkind, and it was a terrible thing for me because everybody was sure it would be a big hit — and so was I."

== Home media ==
The Last Valley was released on VHS by Magnetic Video Corporation in 1981, and on CED by CBS/Fox Video in 1983. Since then, it has been released on DVD through four different labels: by Anchor Bay Entertainment on November 16, 1999, by Pearson International Television Ltd in 2001, by MGM Home Entertainment on May 25, 2004, and by Kino Lorber Studio Classics (on both DVD and Blu-ray) on June 23, 2020. The Pearson DVD was presented in a 4x3 format, cut down from the original widescreen version.

== Sources ==
- Clavell, James (Director) (January 28, 1971). The Last Valley (Motion picture). ABC.
