= Neustift im Stubaital =

- Municipality
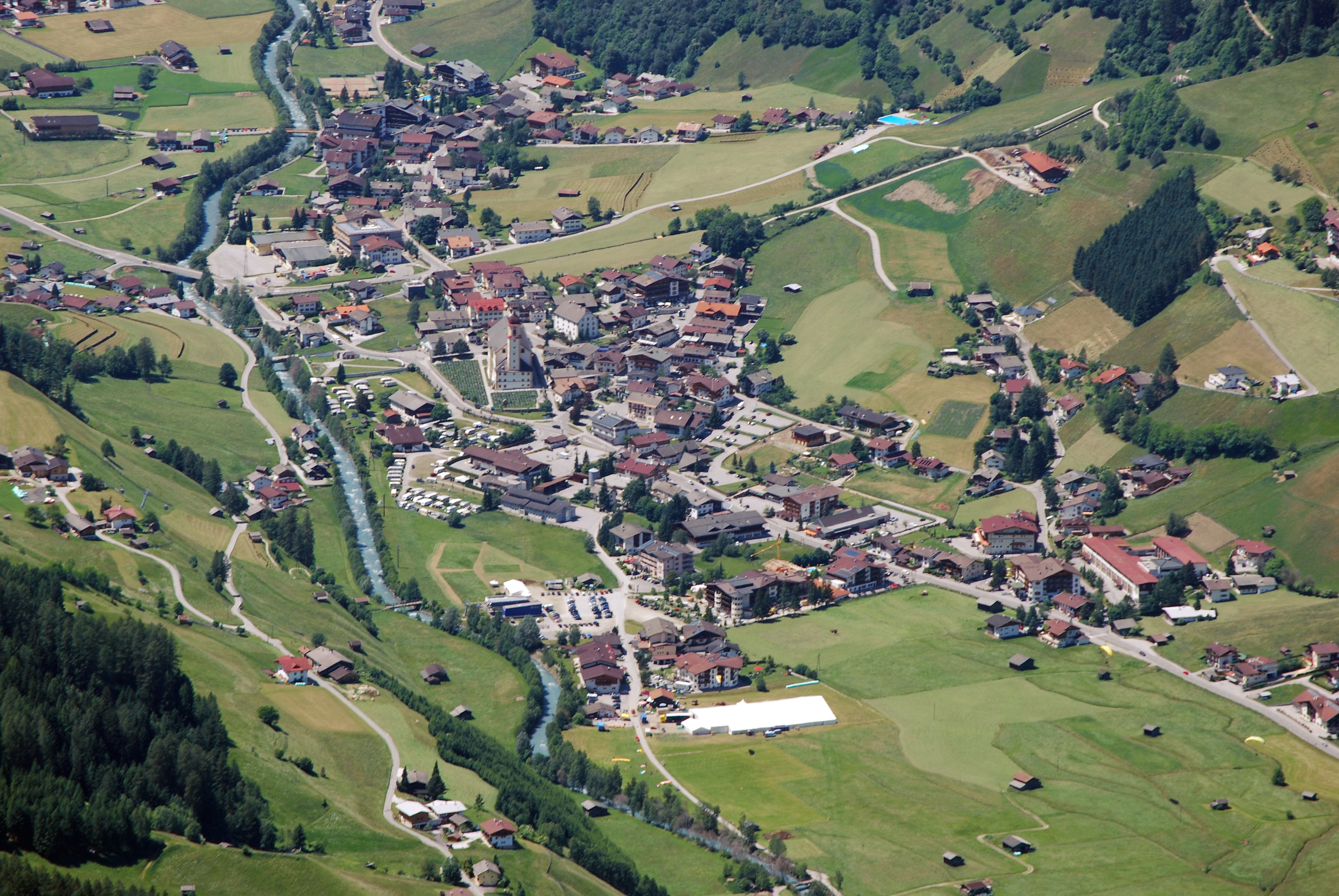

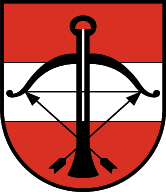
- Coat of arms

- Location within Austria
- Coordinates: 47°06′37″N 11°18′21″E
- Country: Austria
- State: Tyrol
- District: Innsbruck Land

Government
  - Mayor: Peter Schönherr

Area
  - Total: 249 km^{2} (96 sq mi)
- Elevation: 994 m (3,261 ft)

Population (2021)
  - Total: 4,817
  - Density: 19.3/km^{2} (50.1/sq mi)
- Time zone: UTC+1 (CET)
  - Summer (DST): UTC+2 (CEST)
- Postal code: 6167
- Area code: 05226
- Vehicle registration: IL
- Website: www.neustift.tirol.gv.at

Neustift im Stubaital is a municipality in the district Innsbruck-Land in the Austrian state of Tyrol. It is the third largest municipality of Tyrol in area. It is a major tourist centre, with more than 1 million overnight stays per year.

== Geography ==
Neustift is located 25 kilometres (15 miles) south of Innsbruck in the Stubaital or Stubai Valley. This broad valley is one of the most scenic in Tyrol. At the entrance to the valley stand massive limestone formations. Around the upper valley, peaks of gneiss and granite rise above 3,000 metres (about 10,000 feet) to areas of permanent ice. Five glaciers covering 15 square kilometres (5.8 sq mi) form a large glacier ski area, the Stubai Glacier. Including the facilities here and in three other ski areas, the valley has 42 cable cars and ski lifts.

Neustift is connected to Innsbruck by a bus line operated by Innsbrucker Verkehrsbetriebe.

Neustift im Stubaital consists of the following sections and villages: Kampl, Neder, Dorf, Scheibe, Milders, Oberberg, Stackler, Lehner, Schaller, Krössbach, Neugasteig, Gasteig, Volderau, Ranalt, and Mutterberg.

The municipalities bordering on Neustift are Brenner, Fulpmes, Grinzens, Gschnitz, Längenfeld, Mühlbachl, Ratschings, Sankt Sigmund im Sellrain, Sellrain, Sölden, Telfes im Stubai, and Trins.

== History ==
=== Origin ===
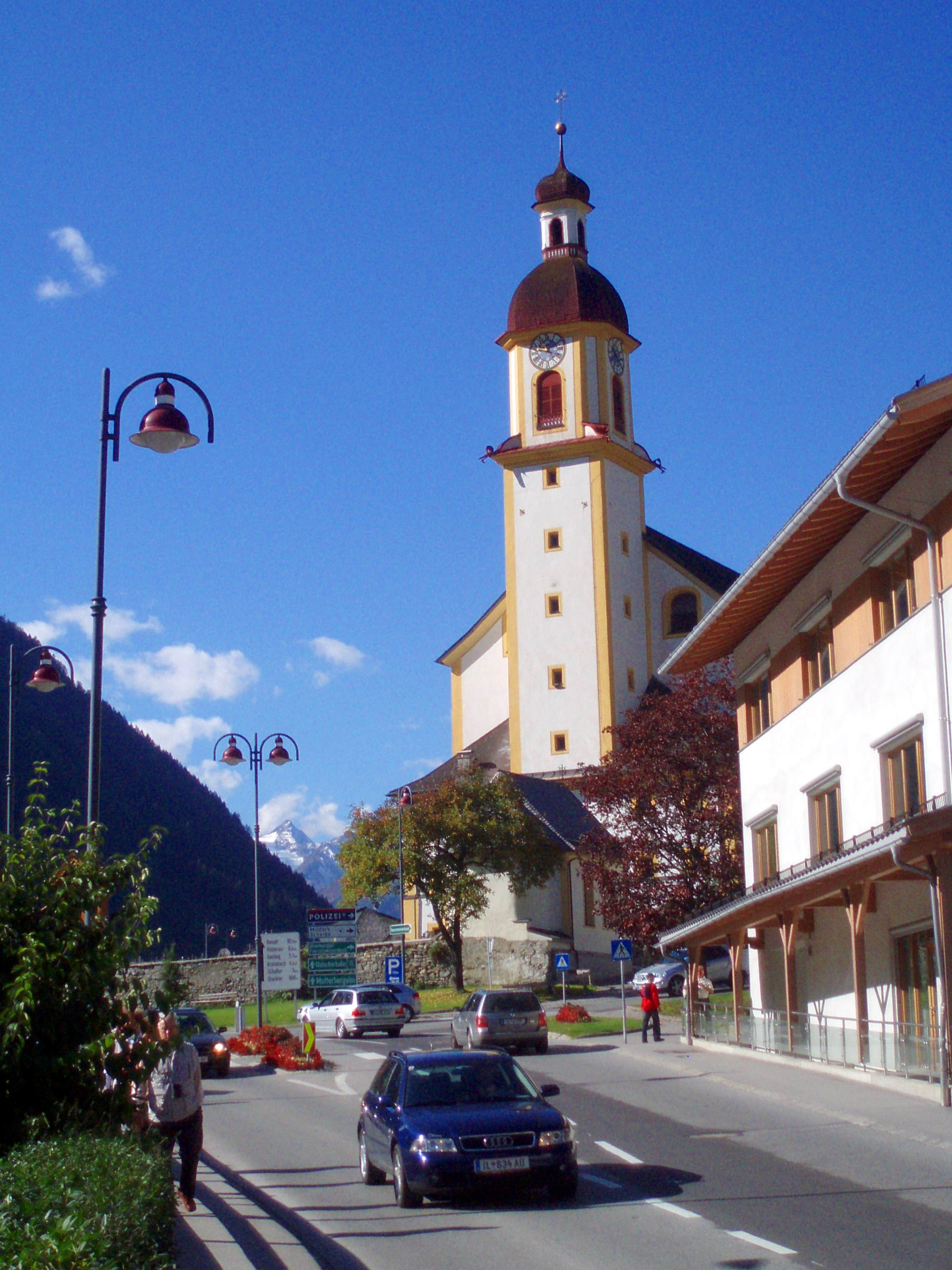
View of the parish church

Around 1000, the Stubaital was first mentioned in writing as Stupeia. By 1400, the district of Stubai was composed of five small communities: Telfes, Schönberg, Mieders, Fulpmes, and "im Tal" ("in the valley").

Although the name Neustift appears in records from the 14th century as "Niwenstift im tal ze Stubai", centuries passed before the modern name Neustift prevailed over im Tal as the name of the community. The inhabitants of Neustift are still known today as Tholer ("valley dwellers").

Place names in the region point to pre-Roman settlement. When Caesar Augustus and his legions pushed north in 15 BCE, the mountain people living here and their region were subjugated as the Roman province of Raetia. Subsequently, the Romans made an impact on the region through their administration and later through Christianization. Prehistoric finds from the early Bronze Age (c. 1800–1000 BCE) show that the valley was settled in ancient times. The many Rhaeto-Romance place names suggest that the German language did not prevail in the region until some time during the Middle Ages. These place names include the following:

- Falbeson: val busana: pocket valley
- Ranalt: rovina alta: high landslide
- Pfurtschell: furcella: notch or gap
- Tschangelair: cingularia: enclosure
- Kartnall: curtinale: small courtyard
- Kampl: campus: field

During World War II, the Schutzstaffel (SS) had a mountaineering training centre in Neustift, where prisoners from the Dachau concentration camp were put to work.

=== Coat-of-arms ===
The emblem of the town consists of a red shield, with a central horizontal white band like the Austrian flag, and a crossbow with two central black arrows crossing each other. The crossbow is a reminiscent of the hunting trips of Emperor Maximilian to Oberbergtal.

== Population ==
Historical population
Year	Pop.	±%
1869	1,241	—
1880	1,265	+1.9%
1890	1,217	−3.8%
1900	1,344	+10.4%
1910	1,372	+2.1%
1923	1,372	+0.0%
1934	1,646	+20.0%
1939	1,805	+9.7%
1951	2,018	+11.8%
1961	2,195	+8.8%
1971	2,794	+27.3%
1981	3,307	+18.4%
1991	3,791	+14.6%
2001	4,328	+14.2%
2011	4,510	+4.2%

== Sights ==
=== St. George Church ===
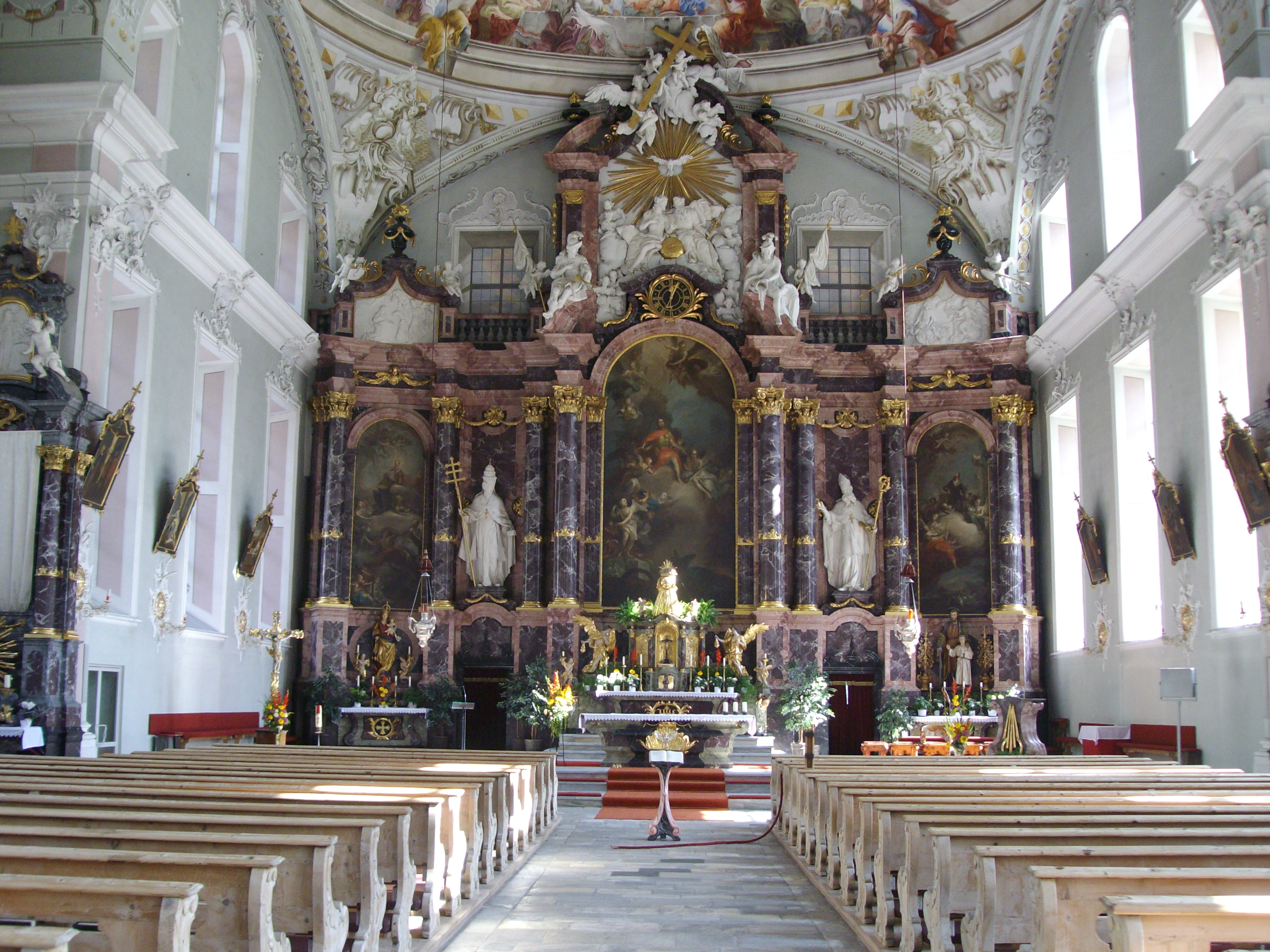
Interior of the parish church

Emperor Maximilian I hunted deer, chamois, and boar in the upper Stubaital. In 1505 he founded a chapel in Neustift, though the village did not receive its own priest until 1868. In 1516 the first church in Neustift was dedicated to Saint George by the bishop of Brixen. In 1772 this church fell victim to a fire. In 1768 construction of a new church had already begun, since the original church was already too small. Pastor Franz de Paula Penz was the builder of the impressive Neustift parish church. He was one of the most celebrated architects of the late baroque in Tyrol. In 1812 Neustift became an independent parish. Externally, St. George's Church, in the village centre, seems very plain. However, the interior is quite rich, decorated with frescos by well-known masters. The parish church is Tyrol's second-largest village church. The "glacier pastor" and co-founder of the Alpine Club, Franz Senn, is buried in the attractive church cemetery.
