= Rohrsee =

- Location within Tyrol, Austria
- Location: Stubaier Alps, Tyrol
- Coordinates: 47°1′57″N 11°24′46″E
- Type: Mountain lake
- Basin countries: Austria
- Surface area: 1.57 ha (3.9 acres)
- Surface elevation: 2,070 m (6,790 ft)
- Settlements: Obernberg am Brenner

The lake Rohrsee lies, as the Lichtsee, north of the village Obernberg am Brenner at 2,070 m (6,790 ft) above sea level. On foot, the lake can be reached by walking 500 m further east of Lichtsee. With an area of 1.57 hectares (3.9 acres), it is about half as big.

Rohrsee shines with A grade water quality. Its environmental conditions, fauna and flora are almost identical with those of the Lichtsee. The Rohrsee is about two to five metres deeper.
