= Gschnitz =

- Municipality
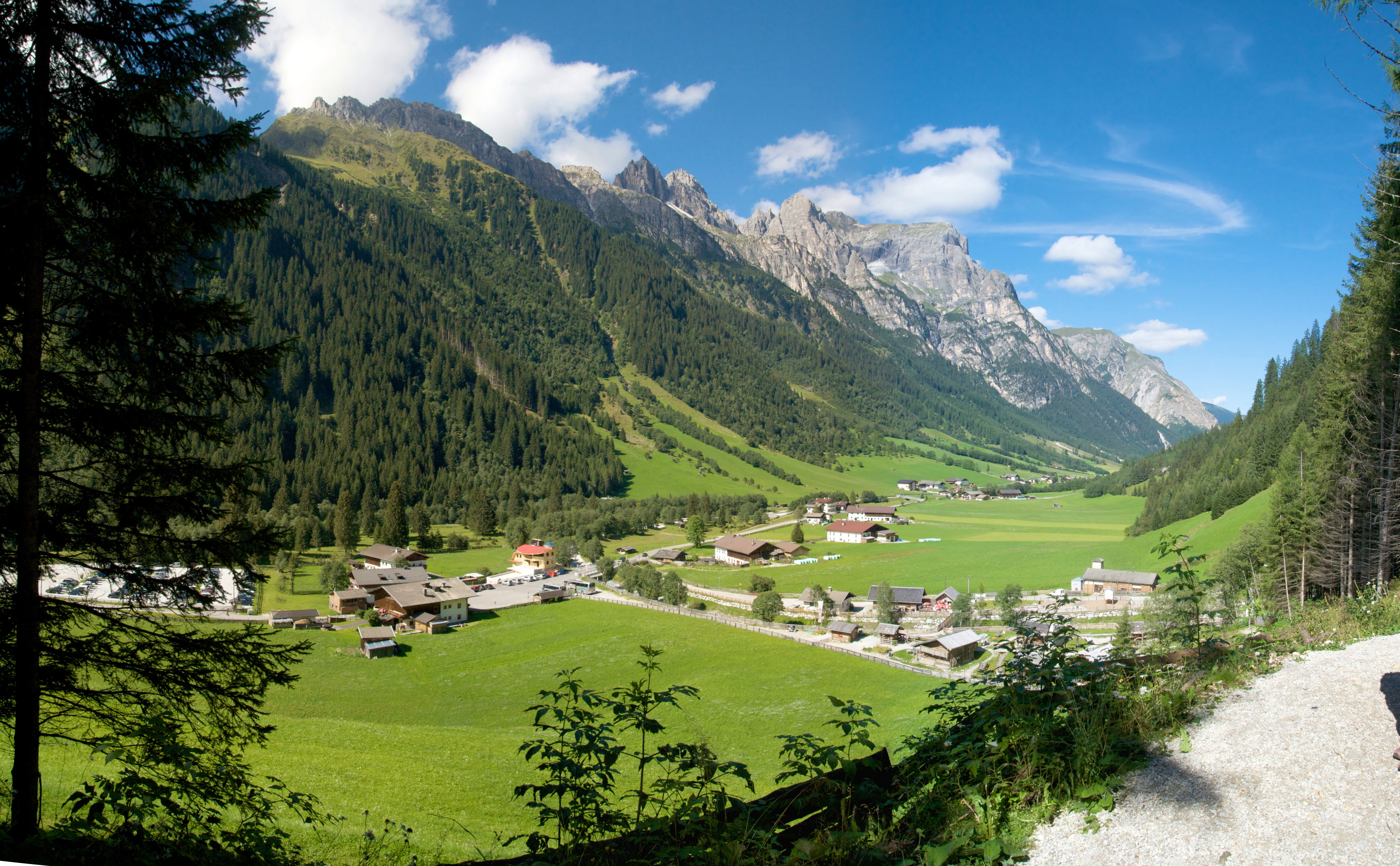

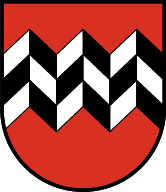
- Coat of arms

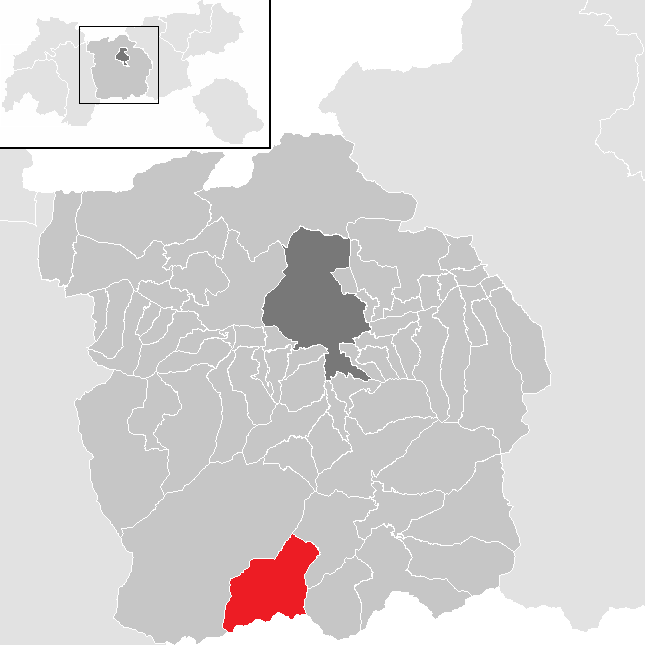
- Location in the district

- Location within Austria
- Coordinates: 47°02′39″N 11°20′58″E
- Country: Austria
- State: Tyrol
- District: Innsbruck Land

Government
  - Mayor: Christian Felder

Area
  - Total: 59.12 km^{2} (22.83 sq mi)
- Elevation: 1,242 m (4,075 ft)

Population (2021)
  - Total: 436
  - Density: 7.37/km^{2} (19.1/sq mi)
- Time zone: UTC+1 (CET)
  - Summer (DST): UTC+2 (CEST)
- Postal code: 6150
- Area code: 05276
- Vehicle registration: IL
- Website: gschnitz.tirol.gv.at

Gschnitz (German pronunciation: [kʃnɪts]) is a municipality with 415 inhabitants (1 January 2011) in the south of North Tyrol.

== Setting ==
Gschnitz is at the end of the valley of the same name that branches off from the Wipptal at Steinach am Brenner. The municipality borders are from the Talschluss (3,277 m, 10,751 ft) to the South Tyrol. The Gschnitz Brook provides the village with drinking water.

Nearby municipalities are Brenner, Neustift im Stubaital, Obernberg am Brenner and Trins.

== History ==
=== Origin ===
The village is mentioned for the first time in 1284 as "Gasnitz". In 1288 the valley had nine Schwaighöfe (alpine farms) seven of them in Gschnitz, which formed the centre of the village, and two at Laponesalm. The right of succession in Tirol originated from these nine Schwaighöfe and was adopted in all the other valleys in the region. In 1471 the rivalry between Gschnitz and Trins arose and reached a point that the inhabitants of the two villages blocked the entrance to the valley; the Steinach am Brenner Court had to intervene to resolve the dispute. Gschnitz was awarded the status of a municipality in 1811. Major development occurred from the 18th century onwards.

=== Coats-of-arms ===
Gschnitz's coat of arms consists of a red background, crossed by three horizontal stripes, one of each, consisting of six lozenges, alternating white and black. This visualization looks like the roof of the nine mountain farms. The coat of arms was made official January 10, 1984.

== Population ==
Historical population
| Year | Pop. | ±% |
|---|---|---|
| 1869 | 210 | — |
| 1880 | 222 | +5.7% |
| 1890 | 221 | −0.5% |
| 1900 | 194 | −12.2% |
| 1910 | 217 | +11.9% |
| 1923 | 207 | −4.6% |
| 1934 | 230 | +11.1% |
| 1939 | 246 | +7.0% |
| 1951 | 278 | +13.0% |
| 1961 | 291 | +4.7% |
| 1971 | 371 | +27.5% |
| 1981 | 436 | +17.5% |
| 1991 | 443 | +1.6% |
| 2001 | 455 | +2.7% |
| 2011 | 415 | −8.8% |

== Sights ==
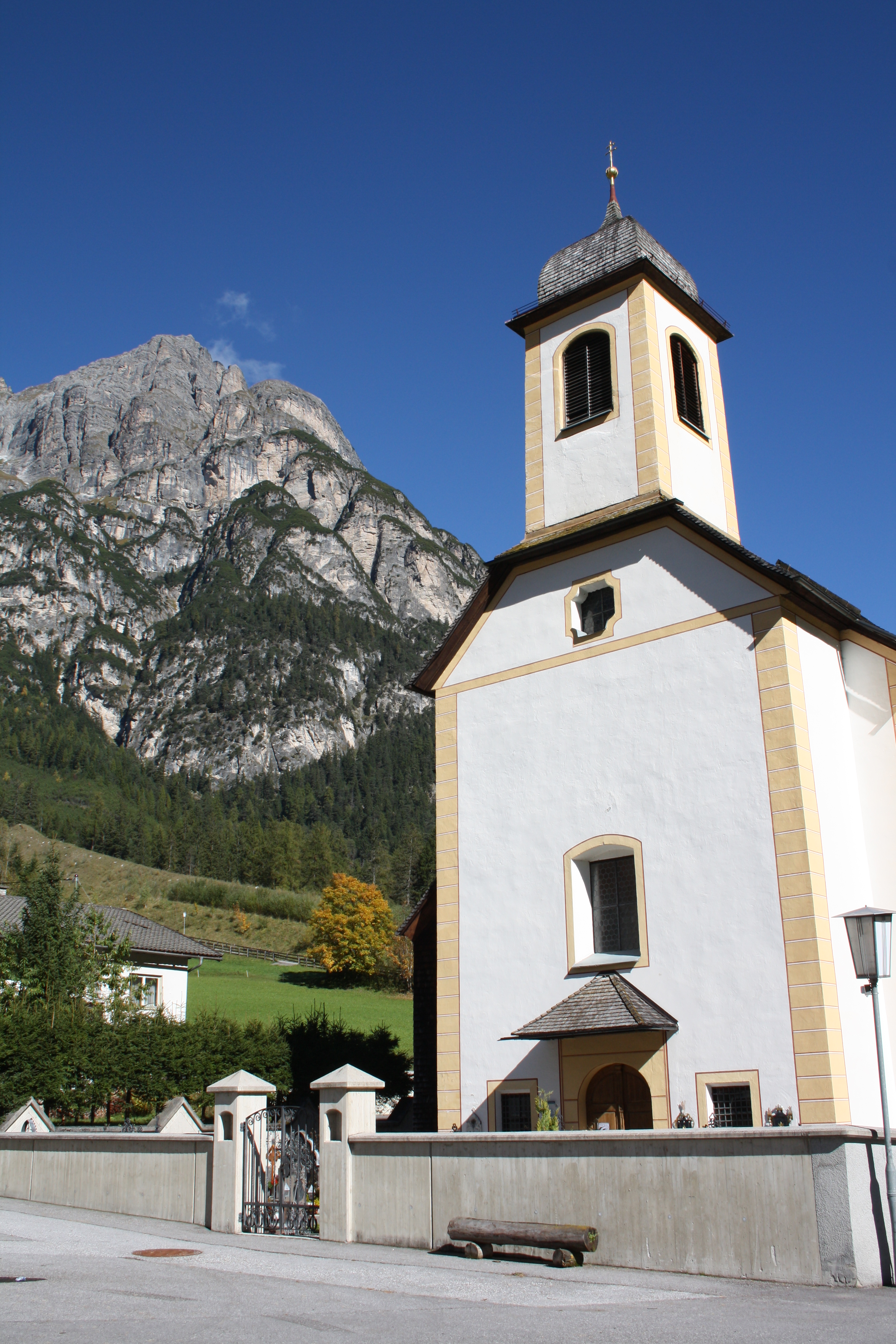
Parish church dedicated to "Our Lady of the Snow"

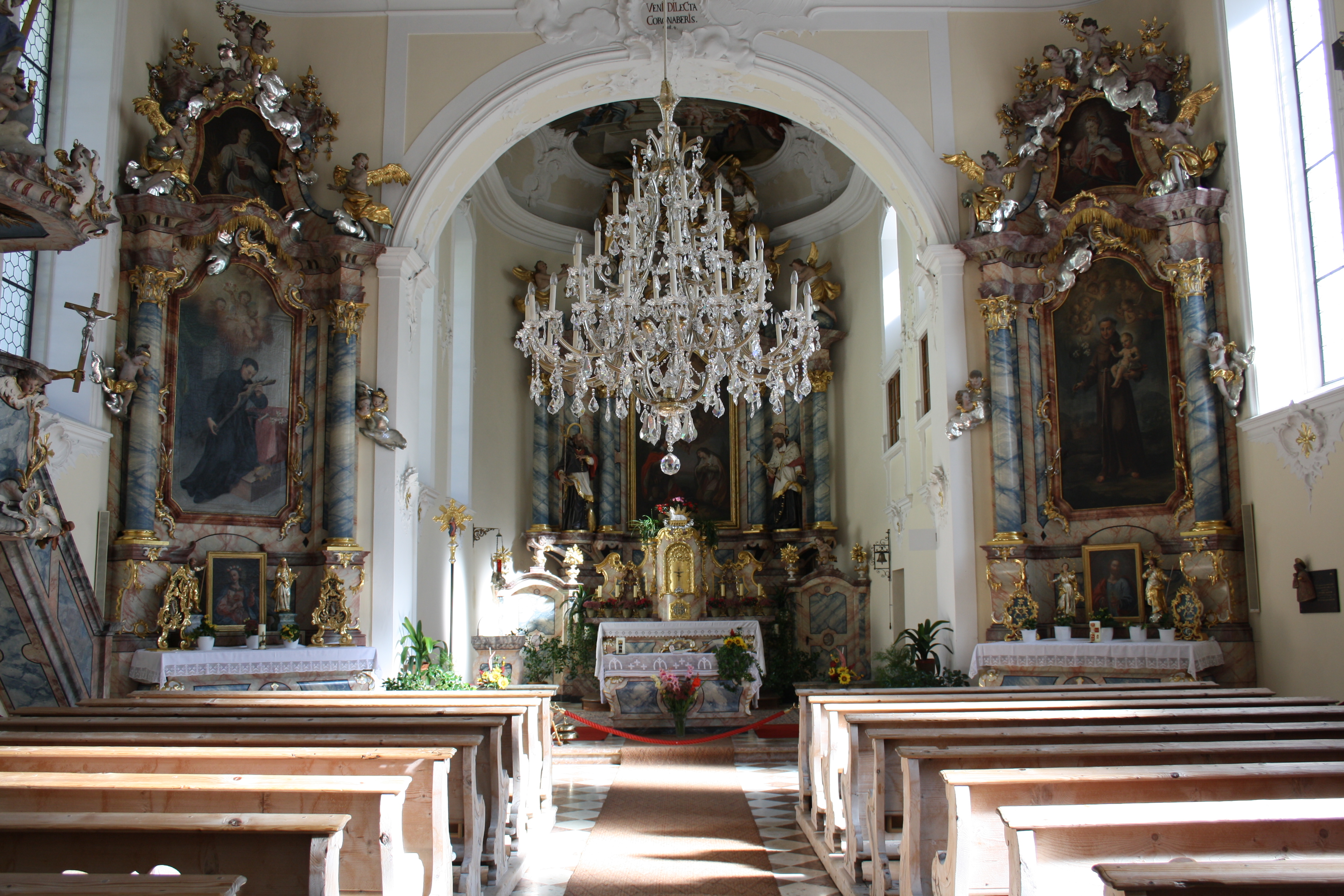
Baroque interior by Franz de Paula Penz

=== Parish Our Lady of Snow ===
Gschnitz originally belonged, like most of the villages of Wipptal, to the parish of Matrei am Brenner. The church “Our Lady of the Snow" was built in 1730 and later, in 1755, restored in Baroque style with plans by Franz de Paula Penz. In 1775 Gschnitz was established as Vicariate and in 1891 as Parish.

=== Sanctuary of St. Magdalena ===
The Sanctuary of St. Magdalena is located near the border, between Gschnitz and Trins, at an altitude of 1,661 m (5,449 ft) accessible only on foot, under the Schönberg. The church is the oldest in the valley as confirmed by the Romanesque frescoes dating back around 1200 and discovered in 1959.
