= Brixen Cathedral =

Cathedral in Brixen, South Tyrol, Italy

Coordinates: 46°42′57″N 11°39′28″E

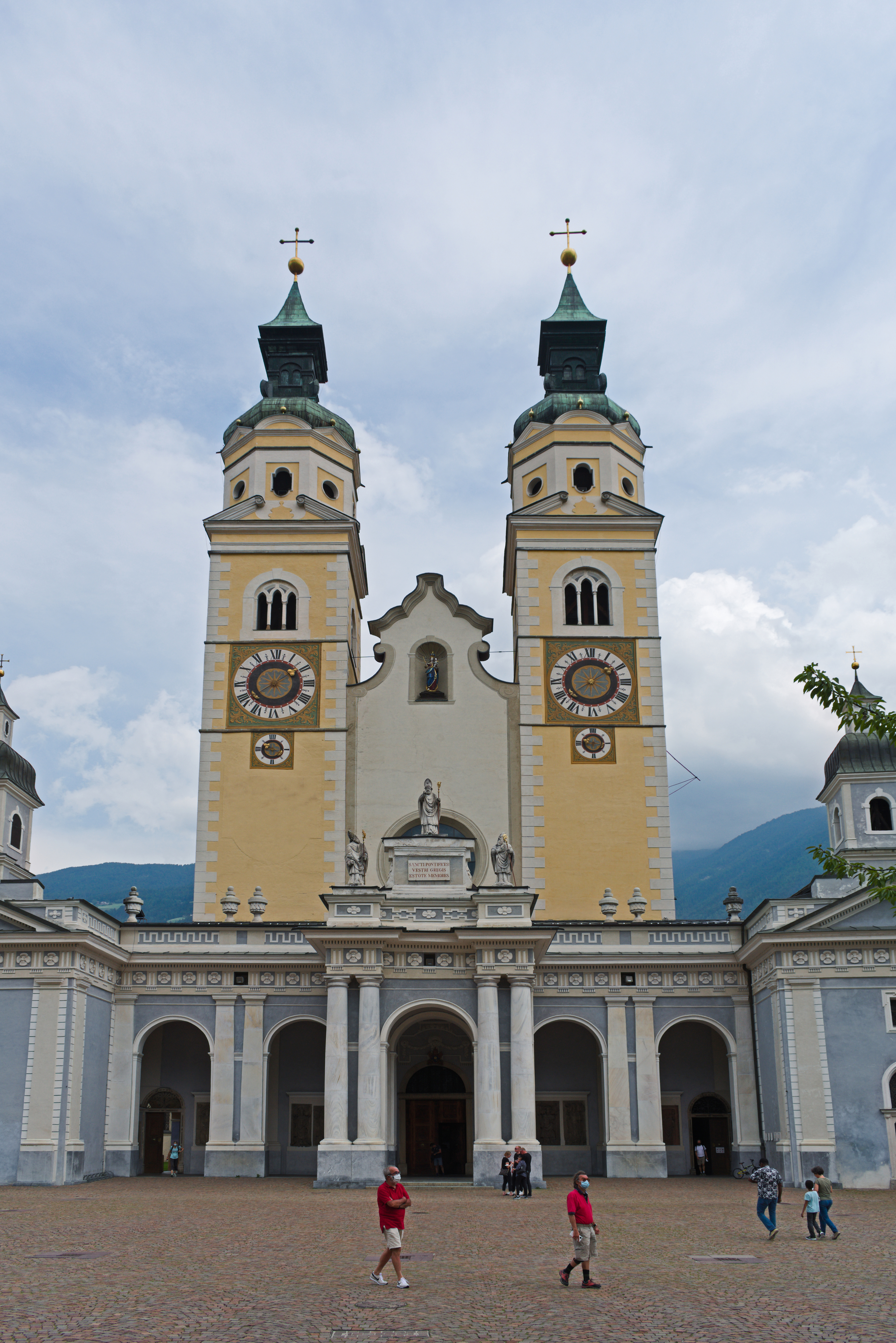
The main facade from Domplatz

The Cathedral of Brixen (German: Brixner Dom, Italian: Duomo di Bressanone) is a cathedral in the city of Brixen, South Tyrol, Italy. It is dedicated to the Assumption of the Blessed Virgin Mary and to Cassian of Imola. Since the foundation it has been the episcopal see of the Diocese of Brixen. In 1964, the Roman Catholic Diocese of Bolzano-Brixen was created, and the see was moved to Bolzano. The cathedral currently has the status of minor basilica.

The cathedral is known since the 980s. The original building was Ottonian. By 1174, it was rebuilt in the Romanesque style, as the three-nave basilica as well as the two towers were completed. In 1745–54 it was further rebuilt in the Baroque style. The frescoes depicting the Adoration of the Lamb (1748–50) are by Paul Troger, and the main altar is by Theodor Benedetti. There is also a Gothic statue of the Virgin by Hans Leinberger. The pipe organ was made in 1980 by Orgelbau Pirchner.

A cloister next to the cathedral is covered with Romanesque and Gothic frescoes.
