= Lake Obernberg =

Lake in the Stubai Alps, Tyrol, Austria

- Obernberger See (German)
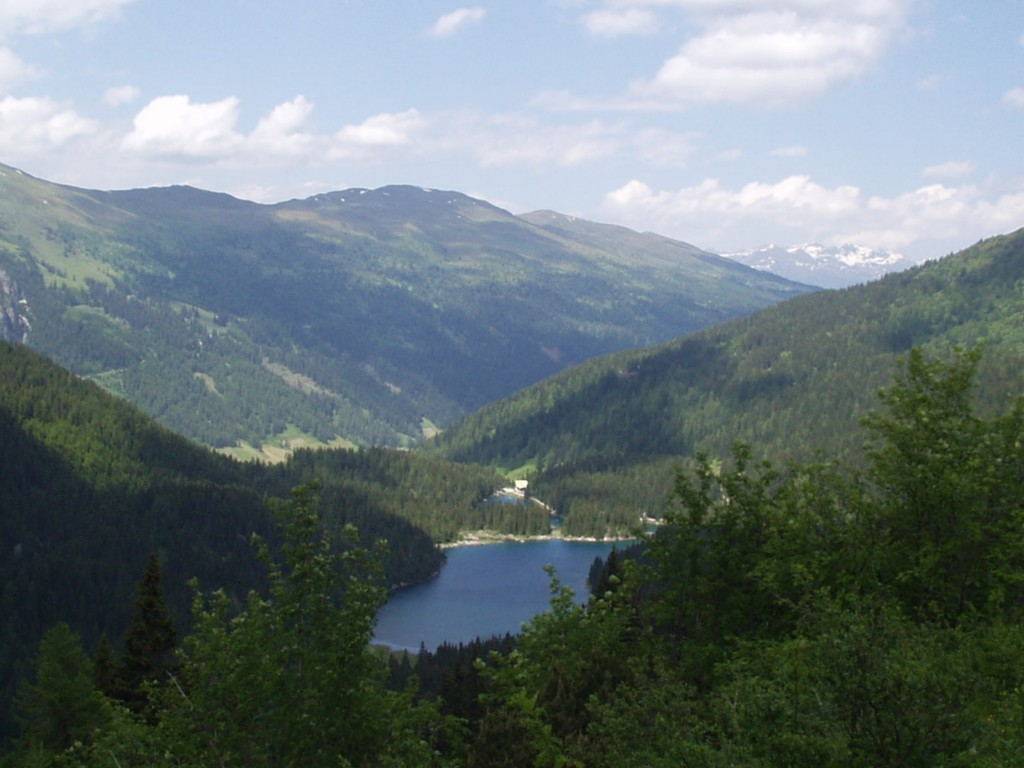

- Location within Austria
- Location: Tyrol
- Coordinates: 46°59′N 11°24′E
- Basin countries: Austria
- Max. length: 740 m (2,430 ft)
- Max. width: 70.97 m (232.8 ft)
- Surface area: 16.5 ha (41 acres)
- Average depth: 13 m (43 ft)
- Max. depth: 15 m (49 ft)
- Surface elevation: 1,590 m (5,220 ft)

Lake Obernberg (German: Obernberger See) is a lake of Tyrol, Austria.

Lake Obernberg lies at an elevation of 1,590 metres in the municipality Obernberg am Brenner near the Brenner. It is the biggest lake on the southern side of Tyrol. The fresh water is provided by the Obernberger Seebach subterranean springs. Around the lake are travel paths.

There was a prehistoric rock fall from the Obernberger Tribulaun (a peak on the north side of the lake). The lake is now separated into two parts, however in late spring and early summer the water level rise and the parts can get connected. On the rocks a chapel (Maria am See) was built in 1935.

The lake has a high quality on the surface and is one of the most beautiful mountain lakes of Tyrol. On the bottom of the lake is a curtain of algae making the water muddy at 13 metres. Bathing is prohibited, so that the fish population and the quality of the water remains untouched. Trout and other fish live in the lake.

== Details ==
- Water temperature: 11 - 14 °C
- Water level fluctuation: 7m
