= Brenner, South Tyrol =

Brenner
- Comune
- Gemeinde Brenner; Comune di Brennero
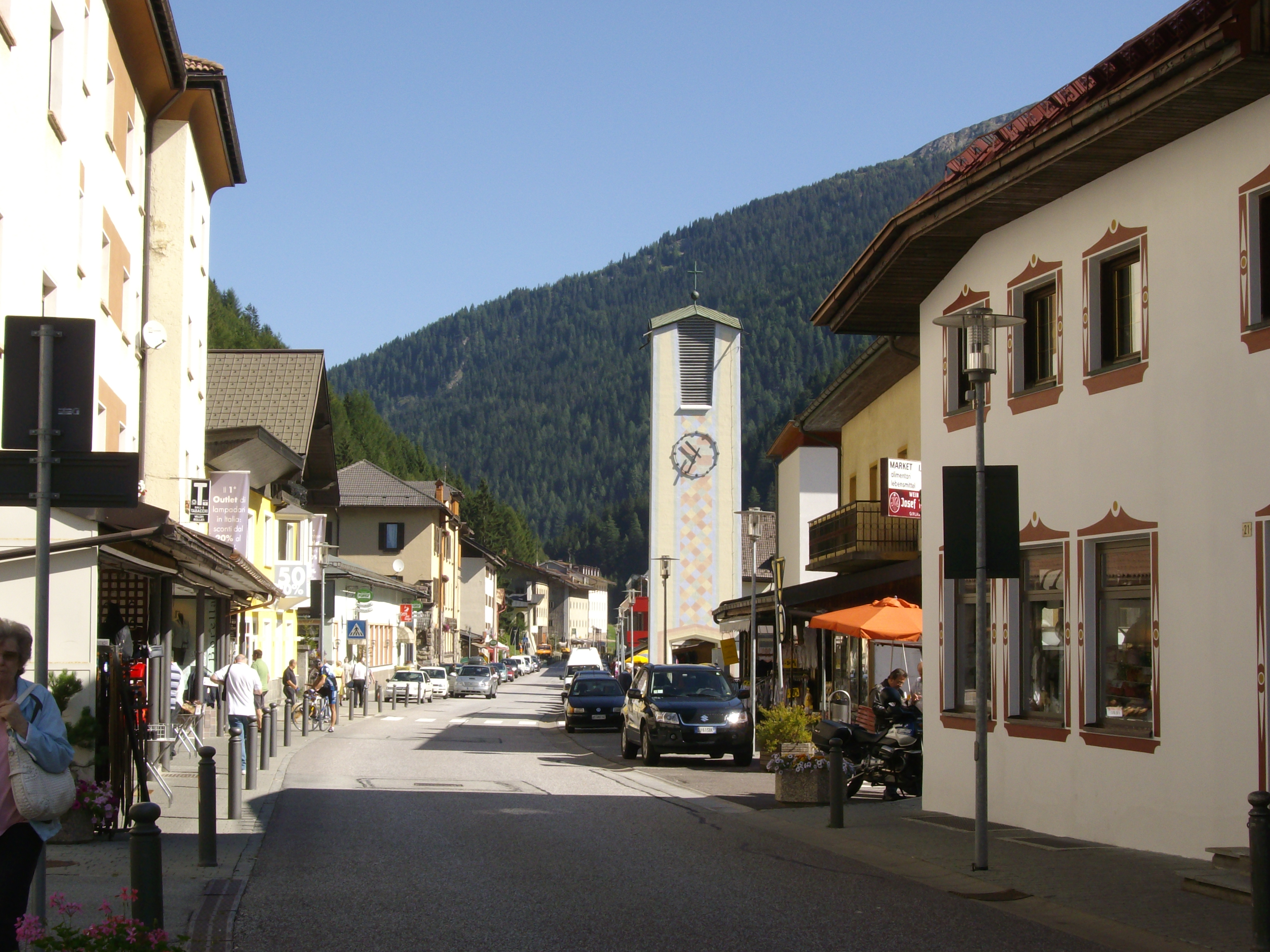
- The main street in Brenner

- Coat of arms

- Location within Italy Location within Trentino-Alto Adige/Südtirol
- Coordinates: 47°0′N 11°30′E
- Country: Italy
- Region: Trentino-Alto Adige/Südtirol
- Province: South Tyrol (BZ)
- Frazioni: Brennerbad (Terme di Brennero), Gossensaß (Colle Isarco), Pflersch (Fleres) and Pontigl (Ponticolo)

Government
  - Mayor: Martin Alber

Area
  - Total: 114.1 km^{2} (44.1 sq mi)
- Elevation: 1,372 m (4,501 ft)

Population (Nov. 2010)
  - Total: 2,085
  - Density: 18.27/km^{2} (47.33/sq mi)
- Time zone: UTC+1 (CET)
  - Summer (DST): UTC+2 (CEST)
- Postal code: 39041
- Dialing code: 0472
- Patron saint: Saint Valentine
- Saint day: February 27
- Website: Official website

Brenner (German pronunciation: [ˈbrɛnɐ]; Italian: Brennero [ˈbrɛnnero]; Ladin: Prëner) is a comune in South Tyrol in northern Italy, located about 60 km (37 mi) north of Bolzano on the border with Tyrol, Austria.

== Geography ==
=== Territory ===
Brenner lies about 60 km (37 mi) north of the city of Bolzano. The municipality is named after the Brenner Pass, whose summit marks the border between Italy and Austria.

Brenner borders the following municipalities: Pfitsch (Italy), Ratschings (Italy), Sterzing (Italy), Gries am Brenner (Austria), Gschnitz (Austria), Neustift im Stubaital (Austria) and Obernberg am Brenner (Austria).

=== Frazioni ===
The municipality of Brenner contains the frazioni (parishes) of Brennerbad (Terme di Brennero), Gossensaß (Italian: Colle Isarco), Pflersch (Fleres) and Pontigl (Ponticolo).

Gossensaß is the main village and administrative centre. It dates back 4000 years, reflecting its position as a place to prepare for the Brenner Pass. In the 15th and 16th century, Gossensaß prospered due to silver mining. Today, Gossensaß benefits from tourism, especially during the winter when the ski resort in Ladurns is open.

== History ==
=== Origin ===
The Breuni were a people who lived in the Eisacktal and in the Brenner region on both sides of the pass until the 9th century. The place, after the Roman Conquest in 15 BC, was called "Vibidena", and the only road was a track. The Romans built a military road in the 2nd century, milestone of Marcus Aurelius, Septimius Severus and Caracalla period were found in the region and in the 3rd century the Romans completed the Retica road. In 565 Venantius Fortunatus mentioned in his writings the "Saint Valentine" temple that later became a church; in the Middle Ages it was restored in Romanesque style, in 1500 in Gothic, then in Baroque. In the period of the barbaric migrations, approximately in 590 the region was invaded by Baiuvarii, the place declined, however 66 German Sovereigns of the Holy Roman Empire, from 960 to 1530 and among them, in 1154, Frederick I, also known as Barbarossa (meaning Red Beard), passed through Brenner as he headed towards the Pope in Rome.

In about 1000 A.D., a permanent village was settled with the name of "Oberes Mittewald" while "Prenner" is mentioned in 1288. During the 14th and 15th centuries the village was busy with the traffic and the trade connected with the pass and a new carriage was built in 1314 while in 1414 the Count of Tyrol established a Customs in order to check the goods in transit. The two historic inhabited places of the village were the "Saint Valentine" church, the "Post Hotel" and few other houses on the south side, the "Kerschbaumer Hotel", "Griesberg" and "Venn" on the north, nowadays in Austria. The old carriage was enlarged and the tracing modified in 1740 in order to have a comfortable road; Goethe, on 8 September 1786, on his journey to Italy stopped in Brenner at "Post Hotel".

The construction of the Brenner railway, between Innsbruck and Bolzano through the Brenner Pass, began on 23 February 1864 at Bergisel (Innsbruck) and the building involved the village with hundreds of workers who lived there for three years. The railway transformed the planimetry of the village; some houses were destroyed to make room for a new area, 600 meters long, regarding the station and the other infrastructures connected with the railway itself. On 25 July 1867 at 8.05 the first train departed from Brenner station directed to Bozen though the official opening would be August 24; the railway opened a new era for the village with the arrival of travellers and tourism. At Brenner Bad (Thermal baths), few miles south of the village, a "Grand Hotel", with a train stop, was built and attracted a new class of tourists until the beginning of the first World War.

On 26 April 1915 the Treaty of London assigned to Italy the South Tyrol, from Trent to Brenner, and on 10 November 1918, at the end of the war, Italian troops arrived at Brenner. The Treaty of Saint-Germain-en-Laye was signed on 10 September 1919 and just at Brenner the new boundary line was traced.

== Coat-of-arms ==
The shield is party per pale: the first is a miner holding a hammer in his right hand and a lamp in his left, on a vert hill with a gules background; the second part is tierced per fess in argent, azure and or. The emblem was adopted in 1906.

== Climate ==
Climate data for Brenner, South Tyrol (1971–2000)
Month	Jan	Feb	Mar	Apr	May	Jun	Jul	Aug	Sep	Oct	Nov	Dec	Year
Record high °C (°F)	9.2 (48.6)	12.4 (54.3)	16.5 (61.7)	19.5 (67.1)	24.8 (76.6)	26.8 (80.2)	29.4 (84.9)	30.3 (86.5)	25.9 (78.6)	21.9 (71.4)	15.9 (60.6)	10.8 (51.4)	30.3 (86.5)
Mean daily maximum °C (°F)	−0.3 (31.5)	1.1 (34.0)	4.4 (39.9)	7.4 (45.3)	13.1 (55.6)	16.3 (61.3)	19.1 (66.4)	18.9 (66.0)	15.2 (59.4)	10.1 (50.2)	3.1 (37.6)	0.2 (32.4)	9.1 (48.4)
Daily mean °C (°F)	−3.9 (25.0)	−3.3 (26.1)	−0.4 (31.3)	2.5 (36.5)	7.7 (45.9)	10.7 (51.3)	13.1 (55.6)	12.8 (55.0)	9.4 (48.9)	5.1 (41.2)	−0.5 (31.1)	−3.1 (26.4)	4.2 (39.6)
Mean daily minimum °C (°F)	−6.5 (20.3)	−6.4 (20.5)	−3.6 (25.5)	−0.9 (30.4)	3.7 (38.7)	6.4 (43.5)	8.6 (47.5)	8.7 (47.7)	5.8 (42.4)	2.1 (35.8)	−3.0 (26.6)	−5.6 (21.9)	0.8 (33.4)
Record low °C (°F)	−24.1 (−11.4)	−19.0 (−2.2)	−20.0 (−4.0)	−12.5 (9.5)	−8.0 (17.6)	−1.1 (30.0)	0.0 (32.0)	0.3 (32.5)	−5.3 (22.5)	−10.5 (13.1)	−16.8 (1.8)	−21.2 (−6.2)	−24.1 (−11.4)
Average precipitation mm (inches)	36.6 (1.44)	30.6 (1.20)	47.2 (1.86)	68.8 (2.71)	97.6 (3.84)	137.6 (5.42)	137.2 (5.40)	124.1 (4.89)	102.3 (4.03)	81.1 (3.19)	66.8 (2.63)	46.8 (1.84)	976.7 (38.45)
Average snowfall cm (inches)	27.5 (10.8)	33.4 (13.1)	37.2 (14.6)	33.5 (13.2)	6.0 (2.4)	0.5 (0.2)	0.0 (0.0)	0.0 (0.0)	0.5 (0.2)	6.7 (2.6)	36.8 (14.5)	29.1 (11.5)	211.2 (83.1)
Average precipitation days (≥ 1.0 mm)	7.7	7.0	9.0	11.0	12.8	14.4	13.7	12.9	10.2	8.9	9.0	8.9	125.5
Average relative humidity (%) (at 14:00)	64.7	60.0	55.4	56.3	54.0	55.3	51.3	52.5	54.7	60.9	67.4	68.3	58.4
Mean monthly sunshine hours	2.1	51.8	129.4	125.8	158.6	152.4	180.9	166.4	139.3	71.6	4.6	0.0	1,182.9
Source: Central Institute for Meteorology and Geodynamics

== Main sights ==
=== Religious architecture ===
==== Brenner Parish church "Hl. Valentin und Maria am Wege" ====
The new modern church was built between 1958 and 1962 on project of Luis Plattner. The altar piece is a creation by Max Spielmann and represent "Saint Mary of the road" to whom the church is dedicated. The font and the way of the Cross are by Maria Delago while the stained glass windows were created by Hans Prünster.

==== Gossensaß Parish church "Maria Unbefleckte Empfängnis" ====
The church is dedicated to the Immaculate Conception and was built in 1750 on the same place of the old gothic church erected in 1471 and dedicated to Saint George of which remains the bell tower. The church was built on design of de:Franz de Paula Penz in baroque, it is possible a former project by Johann G. D. Grasmair. The church was consecrated on July 4 and 5, 1754 by bishop Leopold von Spaur. The front shows the portal of the old church and the three niches in which are placed the statues of the Immaculate Conception, Joachim and Saint Anne. The nave has a cross shape with two arms forming four lateral chapels. The high altar is rich in golden shades and at the centre of the throne is placed the statue of the Immaculate with the child was installed on April 23, 1752 by Josepf Stapf. The four statues are: St. George, St. Stephen, St. Lawrence and St. Florien. To the left side, between the two lateral chapels, is the baroque pulpit of 1777 positioned in a central site. To the right side between the two lateral chapels is a Crucifix by Bartlmä Kleinhans. The first right lateral altar is dedicated to Our Lady of Sorrows encircled by the statues of Mary Magdalene, Saint Elisabeth and Saint James works of 1750. The second right lateral altar is dedicated to Francis Xavier and two Bishops: Saint Ingenuinus and Saint Albuin coming from the old Saint George church. The first left lateral altar is the Flagellation of Christ at the column and the Saints Peter and John on each side. To the second left lateral altar is Saint Leonard, by side are the statues of Saint Sylvester, Saint Gregory and Saint Barbara coming from the old church. The eastern dome fresco is works by Matthäus Günther and represents the Christ crowning Mary and Saint George throwing the pierced dragon downwards.

==== Pflersch Parish church "Hl. Antonius Abt" ====
The first church was mentioned for the first time in 1418 and was dedicated to St. Anthony Abbot. The church was enlarged in 1482, restored in 1740 and underwent major changes in 1810 when it was removed the Gothic style. The church was re-built once again between 1880 and 1888 in Romanesque style. The church has a single nave and two lateral altars beside the high altar. The first priest was assigned in 1737, a curate in 1755 and became an autonomous parish in 1891.

== Society ==
=== Linguistic distribution ===
According to the 2024 census, 77.77% of the population speak German, 22.07% Italian and 0.16% Ladin as first language.

Language	1991	2001	2011	2024
German	70.49%	79.39%	80.86%	77.77%
Italian	29.23%	20.29%	18.64%	22.07%
Ladin	0.28%	0.31%	0.50%	0.16%

=== Demographic evolution ===
Population over time :

Historical population

Year	Pop.	±%
1861	?	—
1871	?	—
1881	?	—
1901	?	—
1911	?	—

Year	Pop.	±%
1921	1,955	—
1931	2,246	+14.9%
1936	2,276	+1.3%
1951	2,414	+6.1%
1961	2,645	+9.6%

Year	Pop.	±%
1971	2,600	−1.7%
1981	2,443	−6.0%
1991	2,242	−8.2%
2001	2,066	−7.9%

Source: Data from ISTAT
