= Orgelbau Pirchner =

- Type: GmbH & Co. KG
- Industry: Organ building
- Founded: 1817
- Headquarters: Steinach am Brenner, Tirol, Austria
- Products: Pipe organs
- Website: www.orgelbau-pirchner.com

Orgelbau Pirchner is an Austrian manufacturer of pipe organs, located in Steinach am Brenner, Tirol.

== History ==
The company was founded in 1817 by Franz Reinisch in Gries am Brenner, but moved to Steinach as early as 1825. In 1935 Johann Pirchner Sr. took over the company, but had to stop production during World War II. Between 1945 and 1973, the workshop built over 120 pipe organs. In 1973 his son, Johann Pirchner Jr., continued the Pirchner tradition, focusing on the construction of pipe organs with slider chests and tracker action. After building a new workshop in 1997, Johann Pirchner Jr. handed the company to his son Martin Pirchner, who took the Meisterprüfung in organ building in 1996.

== Today ==
Orgelbau Pirchner builds instruments for churches, concert halls, universities and schools. The company's primary focus is on designing and building slider chest organs with tracker-action. The scales of the pipes and their voicing are a modern interpretation of the principles of Andreas and Gottfried Silbermann.

== Works (selection) ==
P = Pedal keyboard

Year	City	Church	Picture	Manuals	Stops
1978	Kaltern	Parish church	Kaltern Orgelempore	III/P	31
1980	Brixen	Brixen Cathedral	Brixen Dom innen 04	III/P	47
1985	Perchtoldsdorf	St. Augustin		III/P	40
1989	Seitenstetten	Seitenstetten Abbey	Stift Seitenstetten 20110731-7	II/P	29
1991	Salzburg	Salzburg Cathedral		II/P II/P	14 14
1995	Bolzano	Franciscan Monastery Bolzano		III/P	44
1999	Hall in Tirol	St. Nikolaus		III/P	50
2000	Innsbruck	Innsbruck Cathedral	070406-10 Dom Innsbruck 3	III/P.	57
2002	Böheimkirchen	Parish church		III/P	31
2002	Wien	Universität für Musik und darstellende Kunst	Seilerstätte AO106 Pirchner-Orgel 03	II/P	15
2004	Polling, Weilheim-Schongau	Polling Abbey		III/P	42
2008	Reichenthal	Parish church		II/P	25
2009	Lienz	Franciscan Monastery Lienz		III/P	38
2010	St. Ulrich in Gröden	Parish church	Orgun nuef Urtijei	II/P	31
2011	Traunstein	St. Oswald		I/P	9
2013	Vorau	Vorau Monastery		II/P	34

== Links ==
- Website Orgelbau Pirchner
- (in German) Documentary about Orgelbau Pirchner
