= Obernberger Seebach =

Obernberger Seebach Obernberger Ache
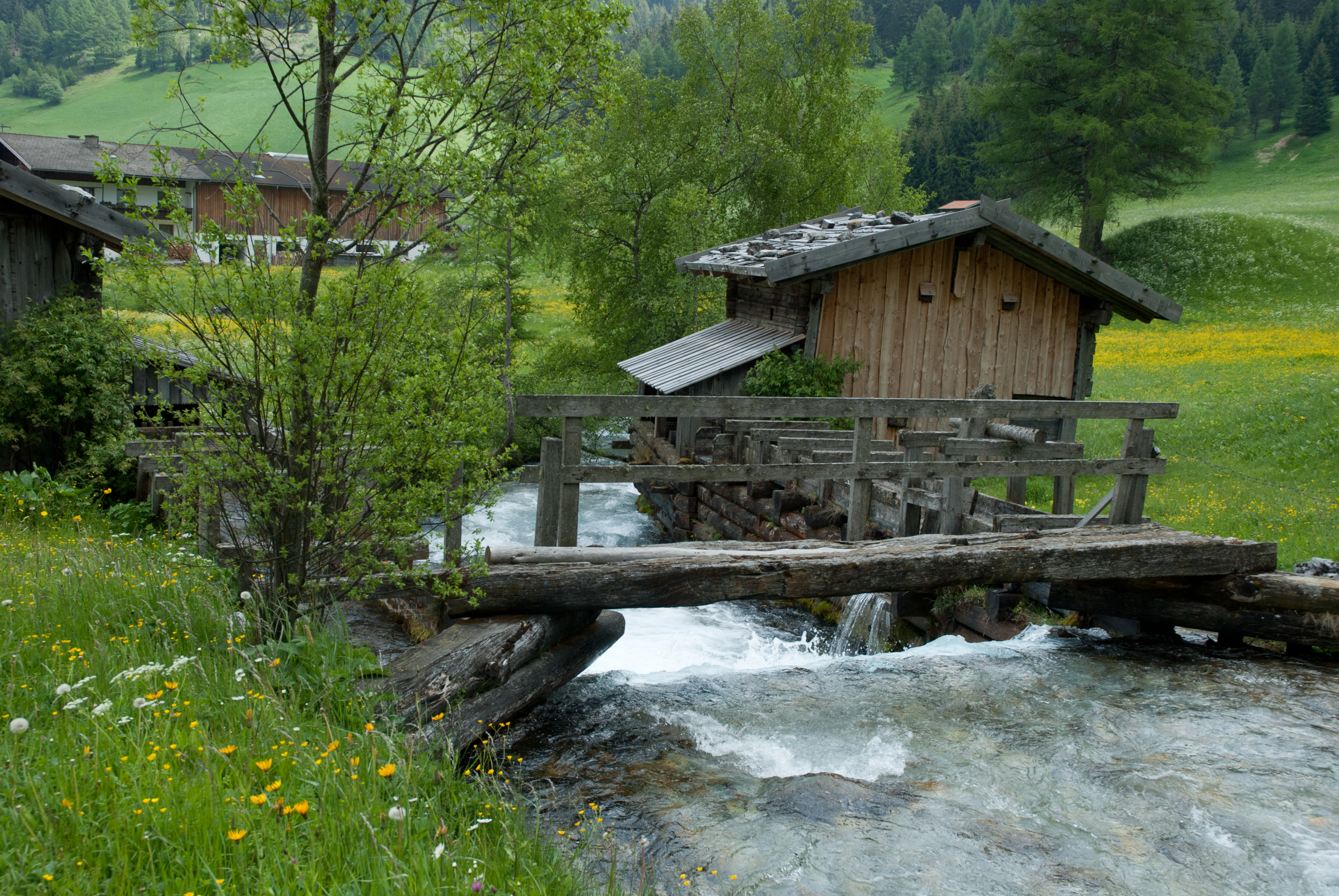
- The Oberberger Seebach at the Frader-Mühle (mill)

Location
- Country: Austria
- State: Tyrol

Physical characteristics
- Source
  - location: near Brenner in the Stubai Alps
  - coordinates: 46.9733°N 11.3965°E
  - elevation: 1,906 m (6,253 ft)
- Mouth
  - location: Sill
  - coordinates: 47.0371°N 11.4791°E
- Length: 11.8 km (7.3 mi)

Basin features
- Progression: Sill→ Inn→ Danube→ Black Sea

The Obernberger Seebach, formerly called Obernberger Ache, is a river in Tyrol, Austria, a tributary of the Sill.

The Obernberger Seebach originates south-west of the Brenner in the Stubai Alps and takes a north-east route to its mouth. On its course, it flows through Lake Obernberg. In the middle of the valley the river passes through the village of Obernberg am Brenner. It discharges into the Sill at Gries am Brenner.

From the spring to the junction with the Sill it falls more than 200 metres (660 ft) in a V-shaped valley. It provides the village with drinking water thanks to its Grade A quality. In the lower course live fishes such as rainbow trout and common minnow.

Even though the river is tiny, it has a high flow volume (approximately 10–15 m^{3}/s (350–530 cu ft/s)). It was quite feared in the past because of its high water. It was mitigated at dangerous points, nevertheless its natural environment is fairly unchanged.
