= The Last Valley (novel) =

1959 novel by John Barclay Pick

- Cover of first American edition (hardcover)
- Author: John Barclay Pick
- Cover artist: Edith Allard
- Language: English
- Genre: Historical fiction
- Publisher: Little, Brown and Company
- Publication date: 1959
- Publication place: United States
- Media type: Print (hardback and paperback)
- Pages: 176

The Last Valley (1959), by J. B. Pick, is a historical novel about the Thirty Years' War (1618–1648). The story occurs from September 1637 to March 1638, and centres on two men – a mercenary soldier and an intellectual – who are fleeing the destruction and starvation wrought by religious war. In southern Germany, each man stumbles upon a fertile valley untouched by the war. Soldier and intellectual, man of arms and man of mind, must collaborate to preserve the peace and plenty of the last valley from the stress and strain of the religious bigotry that caused thirty years of war in Europe.

In Britain, the novel originally was published as The Fat Valley. James Clavell adapted and directed the novel as The Last Valley (1970), with Michael Caine and Omar Sharif, respectively the mercenary captain and the philosopher.

== Plot summary ==
The story opens with a man named Vogel, starving and exhausted, running from a burnt-out, plague-ridden village. After several days, he stumbles into the Valley. At its centre, Vogel discovers a well-maintained, obviously inhabited village but with no people or domesticated animals. He falls asleep in an abandoned home but is awakened by the sound of horses and instinctively flies out of the home, only to be quickly tackled by two soldiers. The two prove to be of a company of mercenaries that arrived in The Valley while Vogel slept. Vogel is dragged to the leader of the group, a man identified as the Captain.

It is the Captain's intention to pillage the Valley, burn the village to the ground, and return the plunder to the Protestant army of Prince Bernard of Saxe-Weimar for whom they are fighting. Vogel intuitively senses that the Captain is battle fatigued and hastily hatches a plan to save the Valley. Accompanied by a soldier named Korski, his main rival within the group, the Captain draws Vogel aside from the other mercenaries who have begun to break into the buildings. Vogel convinces the Captain to spare the Valley and guard its existence from other soldiers to survive the coming winter. "Live well," he tells him, "while other villages are trampled flat." The Captain quickly surmises the rationality of Vogel's suggestion and, with equal quickness, kills the unsuspecting Korski. He then proceeds to inform the company of the change in plans and arranges the elimination of several other troopers who might object (allies of Korski and those with women back at the army's encampment). Vogel insures his own survival in this arrangement by offering to be a type of buffer between the peasants and the soldiers as he is a member of neither group.

Believing the mercenaries have departed, the villagers eventually return from their hiding place only to be surprised when the soldiers spring from their own places of concealment. Vogel discovers that the leader of the village is a man named Gruber who has yet to arrive. The Captain orders another peasant leader to take Vogel to Gruber to negotiate. Vogel accomplishes his mission: Gruber agrees—over the objection of the village priest, Fr. Wendt— that the soldiers are to be fed and quartered in return for their protecting the Valley. Sick and still suffering from his years of wandering the devastated countryside, Vogel promptly collapses.

While recovering, Vogel and the Captain discuss the situation in the Valley—the internal rivalry between Gruber and Fr. Wendt, the status of the peasantry—and the outside world in general. Through a series of intellectual conversations and arguments the two slowly begin to form a bond of mutual respect and, by the end of the story, friendship. Vogel is quartered on Martin Hoffman, another leading peasant in the village whose young, strong-willed daughter, Inge, develops an attraction for him that he finds painful to resist.

An immediate point of contention erupts when both Gruber and the Captain agree that the village's beloved shrine should be moved to prevent other roving patrols from finding the Valley. Fr. Wendt is diametrically opposed to this as a direct threat to the authority of the church. The peasantry are hostile to the idea believing that the shrine has protected the Valley exactly where it is. Even some of the Catholics among the mercenaries express misgivings—in particular, Pirelli, one of the Captain's chief lieutenants, who tells Gruber at one point: "Other villages have mountains. Mountains didn't save them. You have the shrine, and this village has been spared." To which Gruber retorts: "Other villages have shrines."

The following day the shrine is moved. Vogel and Graf, the Captain's right-hand man, intercept Fr. Wendt who is on his way to see what has happened with the shrine, accompanied by a few peasants including a young hothead, Andreas Hoffmeyr. The confrontation turns physical as Andreas unsuccessfully attacks Graf. Vogel prevents Graf from killing the youngster who flees along with the others. During this fight, the raging Wendt is revealed as a former Calvinist minister. Vogel then must act quickly to prevent a massacre between a large group of peasants en route to the shrine and the soldiers who have arrived to block their path. By relating a dream that he claimed he had but in actuality made-up on the spot, Vogel convinces them that the move had divine sanction. A disheartened and disillusioned Fr. Wendt storms off.

With the peasantry mollified, the Captain, Vogel, and Graf go after Wendt but at that moment an attempted assassination of the Captain takes place by Svensen, a partisan of Korski. Svensen's shot goes awry and the priest is killed. As the Captain and Graf set off in pursuit, Vogel drags Wendt's body into a nearby barn. He is there confronted by a gleeful Gruber who believes Vogel has killed him—an action Gruber had himself earlier urged upon Vogel ostensibly to help maintain peace with the soldiers but in actuality to eliminate his own main rival in the Valley (Vogel, as an outsider, was the only person capable of committing the deed without arousing a general uprising against the soldiers or Gruber). Gruber tells Vogel that he must now flee to escape the wrath of the peasants, a suggestion that the Captain later regretfully backs although he knows the truth of the situation.

During his flight from the Valley, Vogel comes across a wandering priest whose own village had been destroyed and immediately comes up with a new plan. He intends to take this priest back to the Valley to atone, in the eyes of the peasants, for the death of Fr. Wendt. "I owe the valley a priest for a priest," he reflects. However, back en route to the Valley, the pair encounter a patrol of Croats, the irregular cavalry of the Imperialist forces.

Realizing that the Croats would destroy the village despite being Catholic, Vogel instructs the priest to take his own horse, ride to the Imperialists, and lure them away to a nearby abandoned village while he goes back to warn the Captain. He is then to slip away and rejoin Vogel in the Valley. The priest hesitantly agrees. In the meantime, Vogel comes across Andreas, still in exile after his confrontation with Graf, and likewise urges him to act on behalf of the Valley, spy out the Croats, and report back. Vogel is then picked up by one of the Captain's roving patrols and brought back to the Valley where he learns that the truth about Fr. Wendt's death is known to the peasants and that he is not a wanted man after all. He warns the Captain about the Imperialist patrol.

The Croats still arrive at the Valley, but its inhabitants are waiting. Acting as the bait, Vogel lures the Imperialists into an ambush where they are entirely destroyed. Andreas, having been captured, bound, and tortured by the Croats, is recovered and forgiven his earlier transgression. Peace returns to the Valley and an admiring Captain makes Vogel a judge of all incidents between soldier and peasant—a position unwanted by Vogel. His first case, however, concerns the wandering priest who turns up in the Valley after the battle with the Croats. Vogel accepts the priest's story that he attempted to do as Vogel had suggested and had not betrayed the Valley. He becomes the new priest for the villagers after agreeing to remain apolitical. The Captain also agrees to Vogel's suggestion of training some of the villagers as a type of militia to assist with protecting the Valley after the defection of Hansen, another of Korski's partisans, along with two other mercenaries.

Tension begins rising again in the Valley and Vogel narrowly prevents the rape of Inge. Andreas tells Vogel that some of the militiamen are conspiring with Hansen and leads him to a place where they transact business. Instead, Andreas attempts to kill Vogel, jealous of Inge's infatuation with him and the general situation of the mercenaries presence in the Valley. At the last minute, however, he changes his mind, realizing the futility of his action, and saves Vogel. Vogel proceeds to inform the Captain of the plot, only to discover that it is already known to him and that Graf has been feeding disinformation to the traitors. Based on what they perceive to be Hansen's plan, the Captain and Graf plan accordingly, assigning three mercenaries to Vogel to protect the villagers in a hidden hedge while the rest set an ambush. Hansen's attack is thwarted but several mercenaries are killed and many are wounded.

Peace returns again to the Valley. The soldiers become more peasant-like, the peasants grow to accept the soldiers, and one mercenary marries a local girl. The reverie is interrupted by a travelling merchant who warns that the warring parties, Prince Bernard and Imperialist general Johann von Werth, are drawing closer to their location. Finally, a local man informs a patrol that the armies have arrived at the Rhine, two days away. Faced with impending doom, the Captain and Gruber agree that the company will leave the Valley and rejoin the Protestant army in order lure away other patrols and keep the Valley safe. Taking with him the remains of his original force as well as the bulk of the peasant militia, the Captain and company head off to the army encampment at Rheinfelden. He leaves behind Vogel and two wounded mercenaries to maintain order.

Gruber immediately plots against the Captain's plans. He arranges the death of the two remaining soldiers, has Vogel confined, and, expecting the Captain's imminent return after the Protestant victory at Rheinfelden, sets up an ambush for him. Warned by Andreas via the new priest, Vogel escapes in the night in an attempt to warn the Captain but is shot and mortally wounded. As he lay dying, the Captain approaches alone, likewise mortally wounded, slips from his horse, and lies next to Vogel. The Captain reveals that in the confusion of the battle, his company had joined the wrong side in the conflict and had been wiped out, leaving him as the sole survivor. The two contemplate the final irony of the war in which Catholics and Protestants fought on both sides of the war, changing sides frequently, and the overall futility of warfare: "You might put it that in the confusion we joined the wrong army", the Captain says. "You might put it that one always does join the wrong army", Vogel replies.

In the morning, the ambush party finds the two dead.

== Character sketches ==
=== The mercenaries ===
The exact number of mercenary soldiers who arrive with the Captain is never specifically stated. However, a careful reading of the text reveals that their numbers most likely lie between 25 and 30. Based on the Captain's dispositions before the battle with the Croats (combined with those known already to have died), the company numbered 18 men by that time and had entered the Valley with no less than 22. Many, if not all, had fought at various times on both sides of the conflict by the time of the story. The following are those who are actually named as well as what is known of their individual histories:

- The Captain- the leader of the group; of aristocratic origins, speaks excellent German and highly educated; trained as a swordsman and was a "younger son;" has been a soldier for fifteen years and fought at the battles of Breitenfield and Nördlingen
- Korski- a Slav with great influence in the company as the main rival of the Captain; was one of the two troopers who first discovered Vogel and the first man eliminated by the Captain with the change in plans.
- Graf- a German, the Captain's main ally, and chief lieutenant; a disillusioned Catholic who fought under the generals Mansfeld and Pappenheim prior to joining the Captain; was present at the siege of Magdeburg.
- Pirelli- an Italian and one of the Captain's three section leaders; a devoted Catholic, he is opposed to the moving of the Valley's shrine but is shamed by the Captain on his hypocrisy with regards to his attitude toward the Catholic peasants.
- Geddes- a Scotsman and strict Calvinist; although secretly married, he remained loyal to the Captain; bonds with Inge Hoffman; killed defending the hedge during Hansen's attack.
- Tub- a Netherlander and Protestant; sponsored by Vogel, he enthusiastically embraces the idea of training young villagers to form a militia; wounded in the battle against Hansen and left behind with Vogel when the Captain leaves for Rheinfelden; killed on patrol presumably by his own militia under orders from Gruber.
- Hansen- possibly a Swede; an ally of Korski who remained loyal to the Captain initially; lost an arm at Nordlingen; became disgruntled with the Captain's policies in the Valley and mutinies in a failed attempt to take over and is killed.
- Stoffel- the company's bugler; bonds with the peasants and marries one of the Valley's girls; wounded during Hansen's attack and left behind with Vogel when the Captain leaves for Rheinfelden; disappears and presumably killed by Gruber's men.
- Svensen- a Swede; distinguished himself at Breitenfield; an ally of Korski who initially remained loyal to the Captain; attempts to assassinate him after the shrine incident but kills Fr. Wendt instead; killed by the Captain.
- Carus- one of the Captain's three section leaders; assigned to protect the hedge during Hansen's attack.
- Keller- one of the Captain's three section leaders.
- Schutz- a German and an ally of Korski who speaks out against the Captain's new plan; killed by Graf, Geddes, and Tub.
- Schenk- a Hessian and ally of Korski who speaks out against the Captain's new plan; killed by Graf, Geddes, and Tub.
- Altringer- a Bavarian who attempts to rape Inge but is stopped by Vogel; killed during Hansen's attack.
- Leyden- one of Hansen's lieutenants in the mutiny; leads the attack on the hedge but is killed by Carus.
- Francois- a Frenchman; assigned to protect the hedge during Hansen's attack.
- The Polack- presumably a Pole; mutinies with Hansen; killed during his attack on the Valley.
- Heinrich- one of Graf's men.

Except where noted, all perished in the Battle of Rheinfelden.

=== The peasants ===
The Valley and its village are technically loyal to the Catholic cause in the war and located two days ride from Rheinfelden.

- Gruber- headman of the village; richest and most powerful man in the Valley before the arrival of the Captain.
- Fr. Wendt- a former Calvinist minister and strict village priest; rival of Gruber; killed accidentally by Svensen.
- Zollner- well-off and influential peasant farmer; the peasant leader who leads Vogel to Gruber.
- Martin Hoffman- well-off and influential peasant farmer upon whom Vogel is quartered.
- Andreas Hoffmeyr- brooding youth who hates Gruber and the soldiers alike; initially hates Vogel as a facilitator of the soldiers and love interest of Inge.
- Inge Hoffman- Martin Hoffman's sixteen-year-old, independent-minded daughter; betrothed to Andreas but attracted to Vogel.
- Albrecht Arnold- an older peasant who reluctantly goes to work for the Captain after being mistreated by his sons.
- Clara Arnold- Arnold's wife who likewise works for the Captain, cooking and cleaning.
- Matthias Arnold- the Arnold's eldest son; becomes one of Tub's peasant soldiers; betrays the Valley with Hansen and is killed during his attack.
- Hans Arnold- the Arnold's second son; becomes one of Tub's peasant soldiers and stays loyal; leaves with the Captain for Rheinfelden.
- Ritter- an older peasant who was previously a soldier under the generals Tilly, Arnim, and Wallenstein; returned to the Valley after the Battle of Wolgast; with Tub, trains the village militia.
- Grandmother Hoffman- Martin Hoffman's mother (Inge's grandmother); a devout Catholic and perceptive woman who looks out for Vogel.
- Hoffmeyr's mother- a woman knowledgeable of herbs who helps the new priest care for the wounded after Hansen's attack.
- Big, slouched-shouldered peasant- one of Gruber's henchman who tries to kill Vogel in conjunction with Andreas.

=== The outsiders ===
- Vogel- a highly educated man; it is never established with absolute certainty what his profession was- the dense Korski believed him to be a preacher while the very perceptive Captain suspected him to be a lawyer; he himself seems to imply that he was some type of a scholar: "I've wandered a long way since scholars began to starve for a living."
- The traveller- a travelling merchant who updates the Valley residents of the status of the war.
- The wandering priest- a wandering priest discovered by Vogel during his brief exile; from a destroyed village; becomes the new priest of the Valley.
- Heinrich Bachmann- a man from a neighbouring valley who warns Stoffel of the arrival of the warring armies.

== Writing style ==
The author uses a number of writing devices to heighten the tension of the story as well as enrich its historical backdrop. Throughout the novel, characters at all socioeconomic levels can be found discussing greater events in Germany as they understand them as well as relating their own experiences. Additionally, Pick has a penchant for withholding names for a considerable space or even indefinitely, adding to the dynamism of the writing.

The name of the Captain, for example, is never revealed, his rank used instead like a name and as a constant reminder of his relevance in the story as well as the Valley- an outsider, but still the main power. The Hoffman grandmother, on the other hand, is equally important to the story as a stabilising force for Vogel's constantly swinging mood, yet her name is never revealed nor a title beyond the lower case "grandmother" ever assigned.

Others have their names revealed long after they have become a participant in the story. Inge is introduced on page 20 as a force to be reckoned with, but her name is not learned by the reader until page 30. Fr. Wendt is introduced on page 26, another considerable presence, yet his name does not appear for another twelve pages. The brooding youth Andreas Hofmeyr, one of the most important characters, has a whopping 33 page interlude between the introduction of his character and that of his name (pages 21 and 54, respectively).

All of this can be contrasted to that of the central character, Vogel, whose name and appearance begin on page one.

== About the author ==
John Barclay Pick (1921–2015) was a writer and journalist born in Leicester. According to the jacket biography, J.B. Pick lived, at the time of publication, in Leicestershire, England. He was married to Gene Pick with two children, both sons (Peter Pick and David Pick). Pick received his education at Sidcot School, a Quaker institution in Somerset. He attended Cambridge University for a year but left at the outbreak of Second World War to join the Friends' Ambulance Unit. In the 1980s, he moved to live in Galloway.

Pick was the author of the novels, Out of the Pit, The Lonely Aren't Alone, Under the Crust, and A Land Fit for Eros, the last co-authored with John Atkins. He has also written a number of short stories, articles, poetry, and nonfiction works. The Last Valley is his first book published in the United States.
