= Trins =

- Municipality
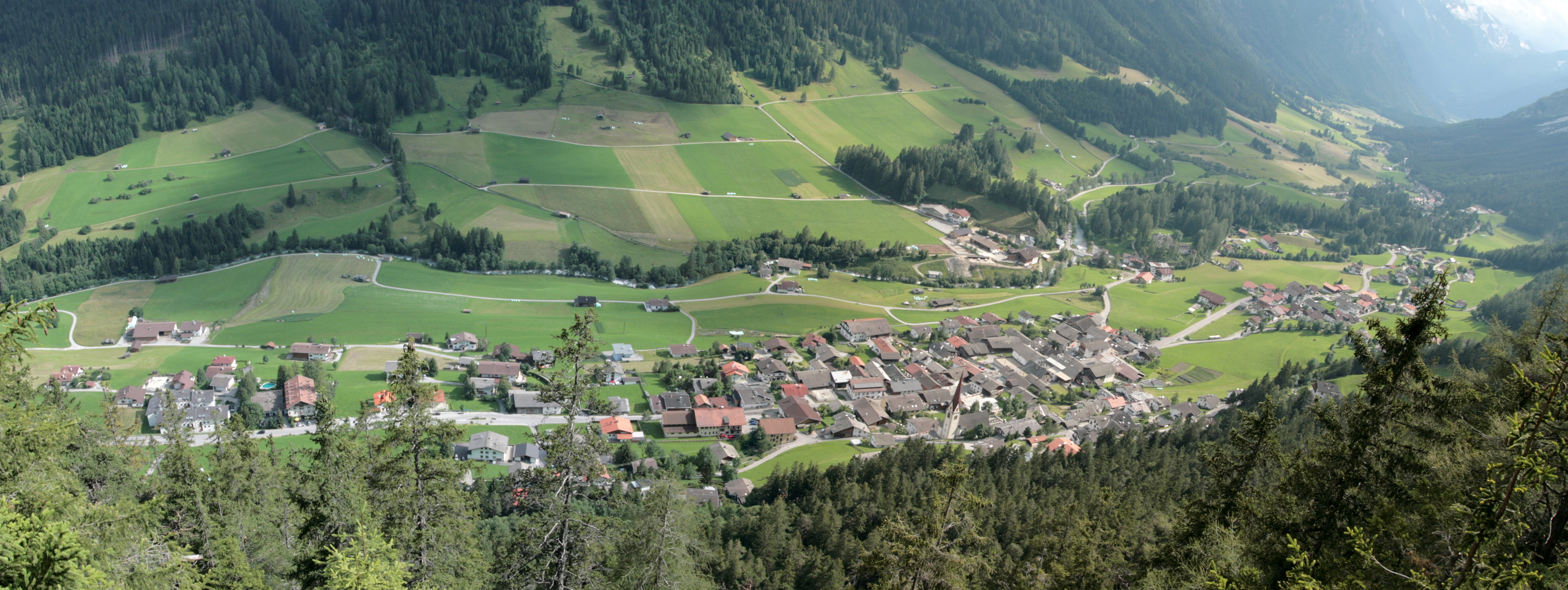
- View of Trins

- Coat of arms

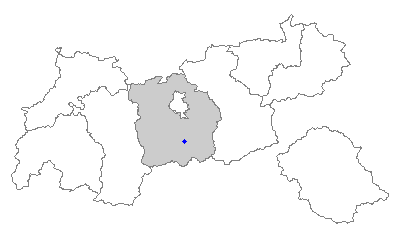
- Location of Trins within Tyrol

- Location within Austria
- Coordinates: 47°04′00″N 11°25′00″E
- Country: Austria
- State: Tyrol
- District: Innsbruck Land

Government
  - Mayor: Alois Mair

Area
  - Total: 48.82 km^{2} (18.85 sq mi)
- Elevation: 1,270 m (4,170 ft)

Population (2020)
  - Total: 1,323
  - Density: 27.10/km^{2} (70.19/sq mi)
- Time zone: UTC+1 (CET)
  - Summer (DST): UTC+2 (CEST)
- Postal code: 6152
- Area code: 05275
- Vehicle registration: IL
- Website: www.trins.tirol.gv.at

Trins is a municipality in the district of Innsbruck-Land in the Austrian state of Tyrol located 20.3 km south of Innsbruck on the Gschnitzbach. The village was mentioned for the first time in 1030, as “Trunnes”. Formerly a part of the village Gschnitz, Trins became a separate municipality in 1811.

== Population ==
Historical population
| Year | Pop. | ±% |
|---|---|---|
| 1869 | 501 | — |
| 1880 | 460 | −8.2% |
| 1890 | 450 | −2.2% |
| 1900 | 446 | −0.9% |
| 1910 | 475 | +6.5% |
| 1923 | 512 | +7.8% |
| 1934 | 542 | +5.9% |
| 1939 | 512 | −5.5% |
| 1951 | 633 | +23.6% |
| 1961 | 672 | +6.2% |
| 1971 | 827 | +23.1% |
| 1981 | 935 | +13.1% |
| 1991 | 1,021 | +9.2% |
| 2001 | 1,191 | +16.7% |
| 2011 | 1,273 | +6.9% |

== Media ==
Location shooting for the film The Last Valley occurred in Trins.
