= John Pick =

John Barclay Pick (26 December 1921 – 25 January 2015), often credited as J.B. Pick, was an English poet, novelist, and biographer. He was a Quaker and a conscientious objector during the Second World War, serving in the Friends' Ambulance Unit and then as a coalminer.

Pick was born in Leicester. He was married to Gene Pick (died 2019) with two children, both sons (Peter Pick and David Pick). Pick received his education at Sidcot School, a Quaker institution in Somerset. He attended Cambridge University for a year but left at the outbreak of Second World War to join the Friends' Ambulance Unit. He moved to Wester Ross in Scotland in 1946, where he took up writing full time. In 1958, he returned to Leicester and worked in industry for some years. In the 1980s he moved to live in Balmaclellan in Galloway.

Pick was the author of the novels Out of the Pit, The Lonely Aren't Alone, Under the Crust and A Land Fit for Eros, the last co-authored with John Atkins. He also wrote a number of short stories, articles, poetry, and nonfiction works. The Last Valley (originally published in the UK in 1959 as The Fat Valley) was his first book to be published in the United States. It was later made into a film starring Omar Sharif and Michael Caine. In 1976, he edited the manuscript text of David Lindsay's novel The Witch for publication.

== Works ==
- The Last Valley Little, Brown & Co, 1959
- The Strange Genius of David Lindsay: An Appreciation (1970) with E. H. Visiak and Colin Wilson
- David Lindsay and the Sublime, in Cencrastus No. 2, Spring 1980, pp. 15 – 17
- Neil M. Gunn: selected letters (editor), Edinburgh, Polygon, 1987
- The Great Shadow House: Essays on the Metaphysical Tradition in Scottish Fiction, Edinburgh, Polygon, 1993
