= Steinach am Brenner =

- Municipality
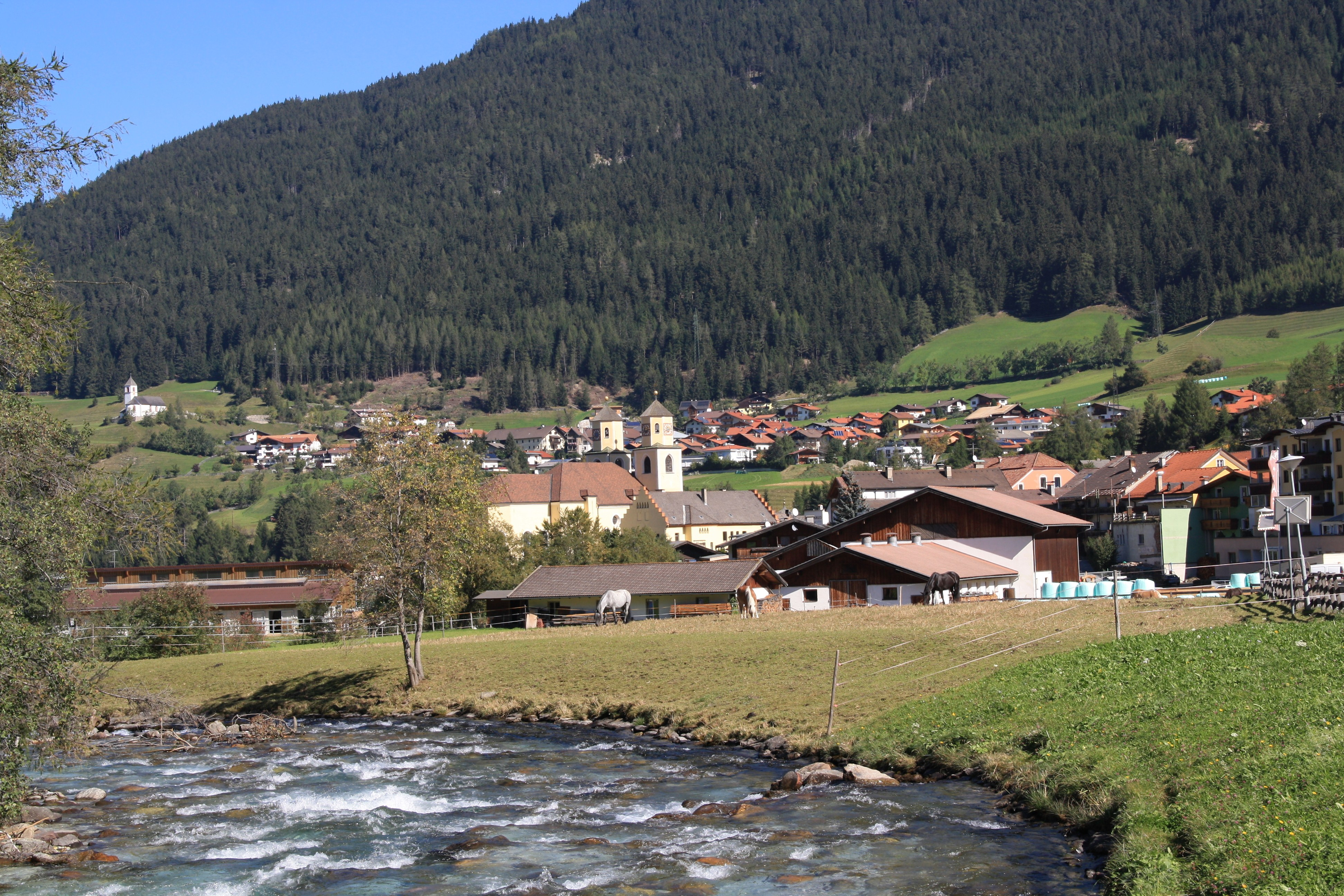

- Coat of arms

- Location within Austria
- Coordinates: 47°05′00″N 11°28′00″E
- Country: Austria
- State: Tyrol
- District: Innsbruck Land

Government
  - Mayor: Florian Riedl (ÖVP)

Area
  - Total: 28.05 km^{2} (10.83 sq mi)
- Elevation: 1,048 m (3,438 ft)

Population (2018-01-01)
  - Total: 3,622
  - Density: 129.1/km^{2} (334.4/sq mi)
- Time zone: UTC+1 (CET)
  - Summer (DST): UTC+2 (CEST)
- Postal code: 6150
- Area code: 05272
- Vehicle registration: IL
- Website: www.steinach.tirol.gv.at

Steinach am Brenner is a market town in the district of Innsbruck-Land in the Austrian state of Tyrol located south of Innsbruck in the Wipptal at the Sill River.

== Geography ==
Steinach am Brenner is located in Wipptal, along the Sill River Valley at the junction of Gschnitz (Gschnitztal). It is run by B182 road and is 31 km south of Innsbruck and 12 km from the border with Italy. There is the railway station Steinach in Tirol of the Brenner Railway. The A13 motorway, which runs the Wipptal on the western side, is on an elevated position above the village.

== History ==
=== Origin ===
The first documented settlement of Steinach am Brenner dates back to 985, when the village was situated on a hill, near the Church of St. Ursula, as "Muron." The present name is mentioned for the first time in 1220, apparently derived from "Steina", referring to the many large rocks at the place. In 1349, the Court was moved permanently to Steinach from Aufenstein, placed at the entrance to the Valley of Navis, while the church depended on the Parish of Matrei am Brenner. In 1407 it was designated as a market town, than in 1574 and subsequently confirmed in 1639. Given its transit position, Steinach was a place of rest for many personalities over the years, such as Charles V, Ferdinand I (1530) and Pope Pius VI (1782). Andreas Hofer, during the Tyrolean rebellion, sometimes made his headquarters here and, on 3 November 1809, took the decision to surrender. In 1936 Steinach received its official status as market town. During the Second World War Steinach was bombed several times because of the railway line.

=== Coat of arms ===
The arms of Steinach consists of a shield with a blue background, crossed by a yellow diagonal arrow pointing down to the left and two yellow circles, arranged in opposite to each other. The significance of the emblem is not known if the two circles represent the stones from which the name of the village. The emblem was issued on 21 July 1936.

== Population ==
Historical population
Year	Pop.	±%
1869	1,223	—
1880	1,294	+5.8%
1890	1,319	+1.9%
1900	1,360	+3.1%
1910	1,421	+4.5%
1923	1,533	+7.9%
1934	1,617	+5.5%
1939	1,697	+4.9%
1951	2,015	+18.7%
1961	2,155	+6.9%
1971	2,729	+26.6%
1981	2,976	+9.1%
1991	3,104	+4.3%
2001	3,287	+5.9%
2011	3,359	+2.2%

== Sights ==
=== “St. Erasmus” Parish church ===
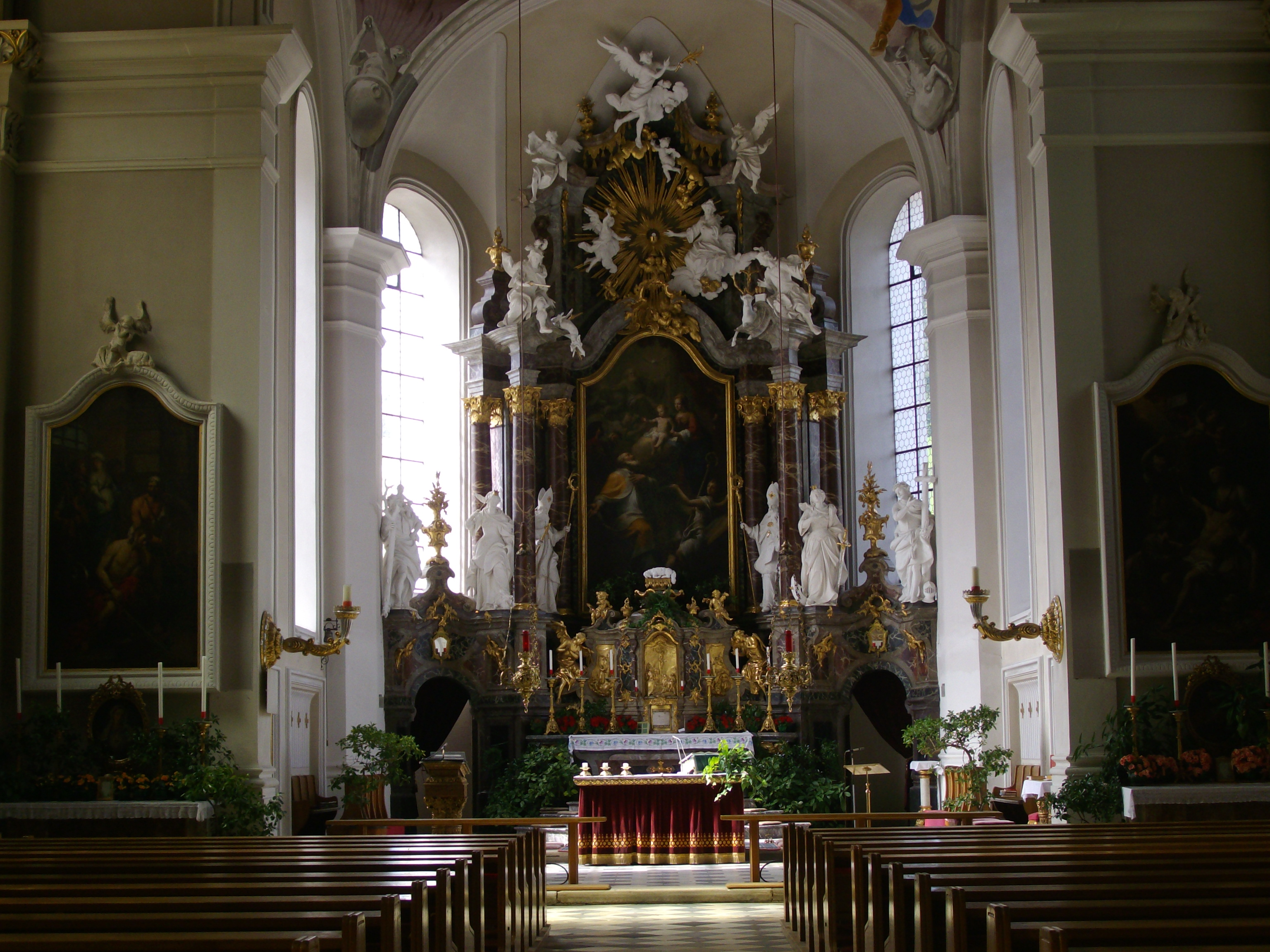
Interior of the parish church of St. Erasmus

The church, built between 1337 and 1353, was originally a chapel dedicated to St. Erasmus, Quirino and Christopher. At the beginning of the sixteenth century under the Emperor Maximilian, was built a new church dedicated to St. Erasmus, in Baroque style designed and conducted by Franz de Paula Penz. In 1853 the Great Fire of Steinach destroyed the church too and two years later was rebuilt under the direction of Joseph von Stadl. It is characterized by an imposing facade with two towers and a Romanesque portico. The church, a parish in 1891, has a bright apse with large windows, a redundant altar and frescoed ceilings. The pipe organ was built by Orgelbau Pirchner.

=== ”St. Ursula” Church ===
The church of St. Ursula, situated at Mauern, is mentioned in 985 as the oldest of the place and still preserves the ancient Roman structure. The interior underwent a renovation in 1678 transforming the altar in late Gothic style. Near the church was the original cemetery then transferred to Steinach in 1483.

=== ”St. Ulrich” Church ===
The church of St. Ulrich, situated in the village of Tienzens, once under the diocese of Augsburg, was built in 1306 and renovated in 1732 in baroque style.

=== Gallery ===
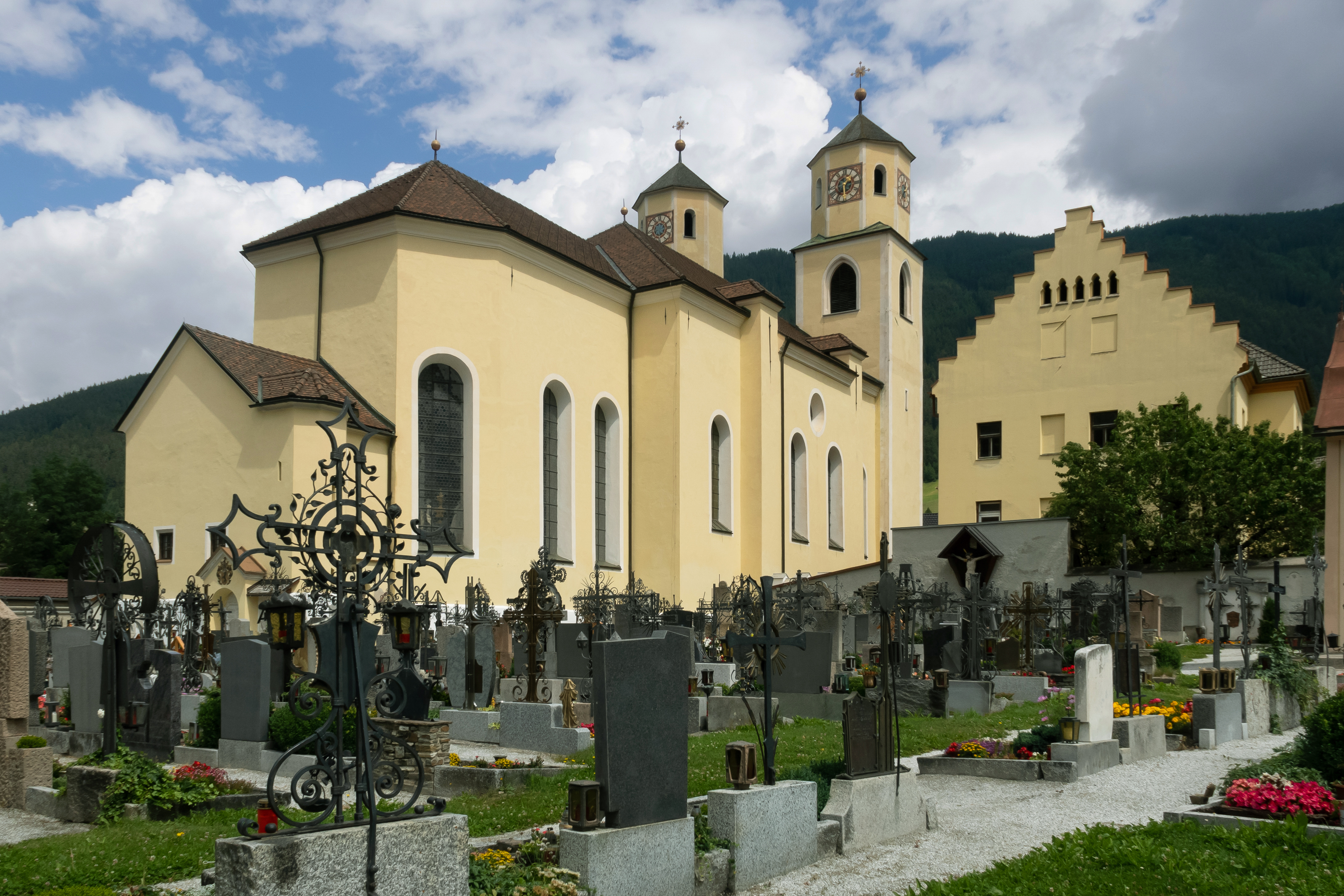
Steinach am Brenner, church: katholische Pfarrkirche Sankt Erasmus

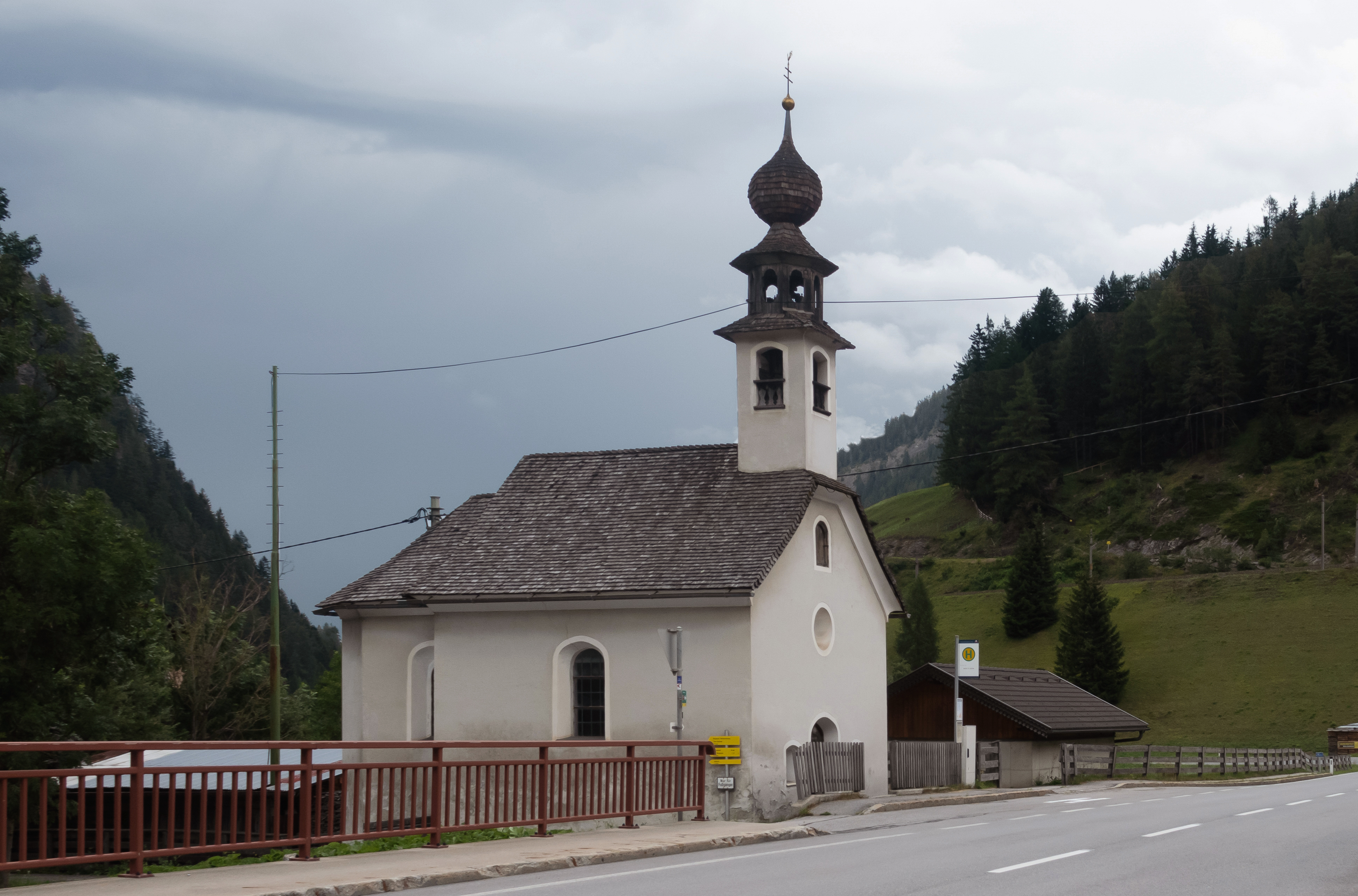
Stafflach, chapel: Kapelle Maria vom Guten Rat

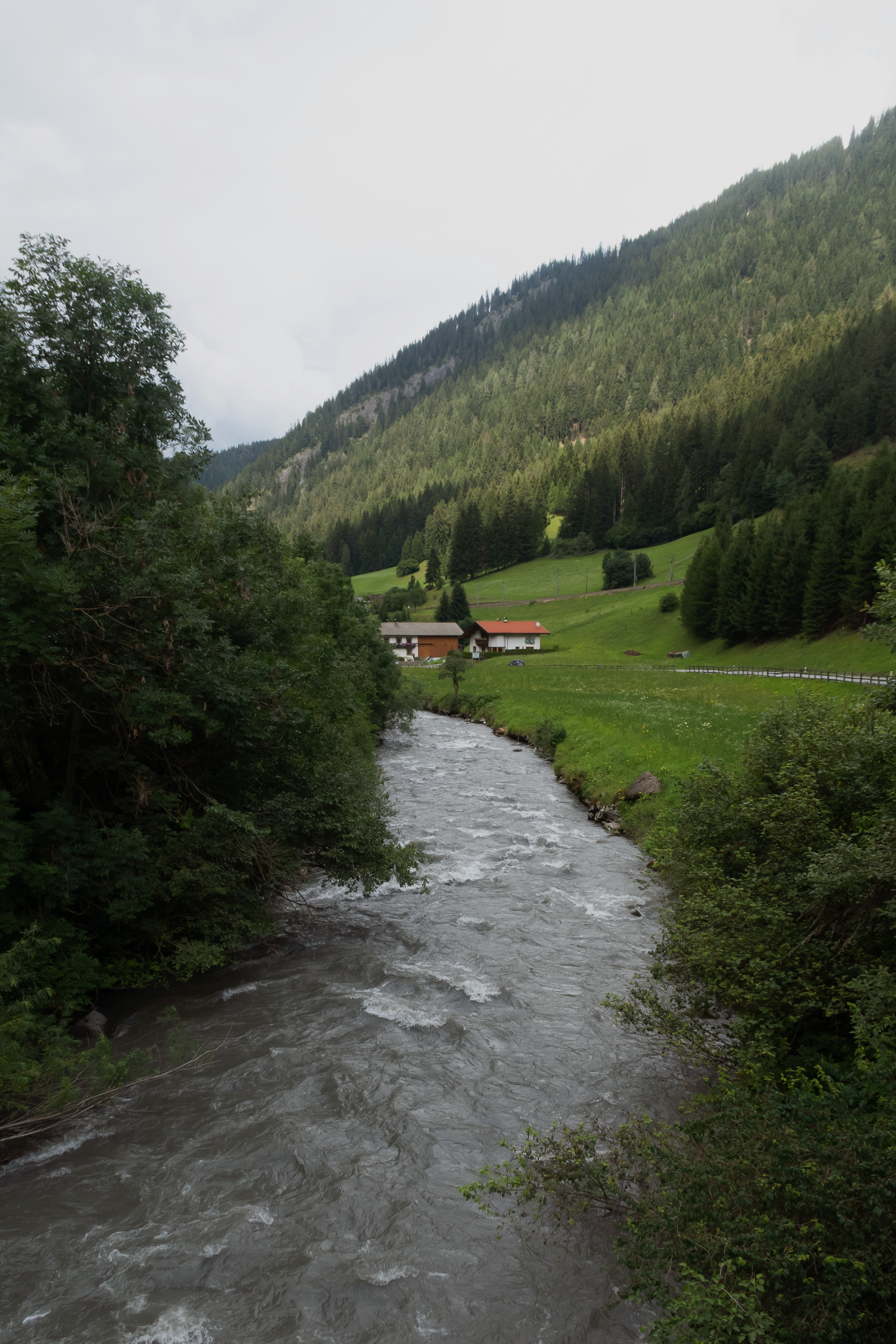
Wolf, river: the Sill

== Climate ==
Climate data for Steinach am Brenner (1971–2000)
Month	Jan	Feb	Mar	Apr	May	Jun	Jul	Aug	Sep	Oct	Nov	Dec	Year
Record high °C (°F)	11.6 (52.9)	14.0 (57.2)	18.2 (64.8)	20.2 (68.4)	28.5 (83.3)	29.0 (84.2)	33.0 (91.4)	30.5 (86.9)	26.7 (80.1)	22.2 (72.0)	16.9 (62.4)	12.8 (55.0)	33.0 (91.4)
Mean daily maximum °C (°F)	1.0 (33.8)	2.2 (36.0)	5.8 (42.4)	9.2 (48.6)	14.8 (58.6)	18.0 (64.4)	20.5 (68.9)	19.9 (67.8)	16.0 (60.8)	11.3 (52.3)	4.5 (40.1)	1.6 (34.9)	10.4 (50.7)
Daily mean °C (°F)	−2.8 (27.0)	−2.1 (28.2)	1.1 (34.0)	4.1 (39.4)	9.4 (48.9)	12.4 (54.3)	14.6 (58.3)	14.1 (57.4)	10.6 (51.1)	6.7 (44.1)	0.9 (33.6)	−1.6 (29.1)	5.6 (42.1)
Mean daily minimum °C (°F)	−5.5 (22.1)	−5.2 (22.6)	−2.1 (28.2)	0.5 (32.9)	5.1 (41.2)	7.8 (46.0)	9.9 (49.8)	9.8 (49.6)	7.0 (44.6)	3.7 (38.7)	−1.6 (29.1)	−4.1 (24.6)	2.1 (35.8)
Record low °C (°F)	−24.2 (−11.6)	−19.1 (−2.4)	−17.0 (1.4)	−11.3 (11.7)	−7.5 (18.5)	−1.0 (30.2)	0.0 (32.0)	0.5 (32.9)	−3.0 (26.6)	−10.0 (14.0)	−16.5 (2.3)	−20.0 (−4.0)	−24.2 (−11.6)
Average precipitation mm (inches)	39.8 (1.57)	33.0 (1.30)	53.0 (2.09)	60.7 (2.39)	83.6 (3.29)	126.9 (5.00)	136.2 (5.36)	124.6 (4.91)	84.8 (3.34)	68.9 (2.71)	67.7 (2.67)	46.1 (1.81)	925.3 (36.43)
Average snowfall cm (inches)	31.3 (12.3)	32.5 (12.8)	41.1 (16.2)	24.5 (9.6)	6.4 (2.5)	0.4 (0.2)	0.0 (0.0)	0.2 (0.1)	0.5 (0.2)	6.8 (2.7)	29.9 (11.8)	33.5 (13.2)	207.1 (81.5)
Average precipitation days (≥ 1.0 mm)	7.5	6.5	8.9	9.6	11.3	14.1	13.7	12.3	9.2	8.0	8.8	8.5	118.4
Average relative humidity (%) (at 14:00)	61.4	56.5	51.3	48.8	47.3	48.7	47.1	49.6	53.9	59.4	65.8	67.0	54.7
Source: Central Institute for Meteorology and Geodynamics

== Notable people associated with Steinach am Brenner ==
- Martin Knoller (born 18 November 1725, Steinach am Brenner; died 24 July 1804, Milan), a fresco painter in South Germany and Austria.
- Georg Luger (born 1849, Steinach am Brenner; died 1923, Berlin), an inventor and arms technician.
- Alfons Graber (born 1901, Steinach am Brenner, died 1990, Steinach am Brenner), a painter.
- Heinrich Messner (born 1 September 1939, Steinach am Brenner), Alpine skier.
- Franz Oppurg (1948–1981), Alpine mountain climber
