= Obernberg am Brenner =

- Municipality
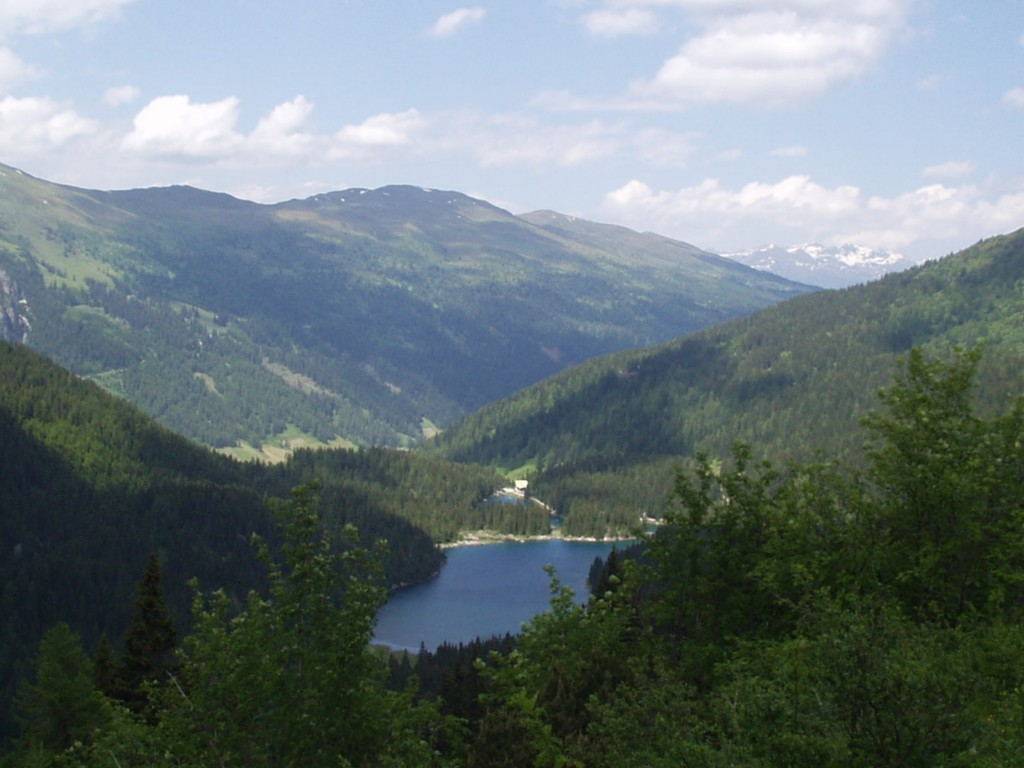

- Coat of arms

- Location within Austria
- Coordinates: 47°00′59″N 11°25′10″E
- Country: Austria
- State: Tyrol
- District: Innsbruck Land

Government
  - Mayor: Josef Saxer (GEFO)

Area
  - Total: 38.66 km^{2} (14.93 sq mi)
- Elevation: 1,380 m (4,530 ft)

Population (2021)
  - Total: 378
  - Density: 9.78/km^{2} (25.3/sq mi)
- Time zone: UTC+1 (CET)
  - Summer (DST): UTC+2 (CEST)
- Postal code: 6156
- Area code: 05274
- Vehicle registration: IL
- Website: www.obernberg.tirol.gv.at

Obernberg am Brenner is a municipality in the southern district of Innsbruck-Land in the Austrian state of Tirol.

== Geography ==
Obernberg am Brenner is located nearly 30 km south from Innsbruck in a valley with the same name, which departs from the west side of Wipptal at Gries am Brenner. The valley ends with the massif of Schwarze Wand and the group of the Tribolaum. The popular Lake Obernberg is visited by tourists; the Obernberger Seebach flows through the village and provides Obernberg with drinking water.

=== Hamlets ===
Außerthal, Eben, Frade, Gereit, Leite, Innerthal.

== History ==
=== Coat-of-arms ===
Obernberg's coat-of-arms is a red shield with three golden skittles. According to a legend the miners, at that time, were so rich to play with true golden skittles.

=== Origin ===
The valley was already inhabited since the Bronze Age and was used as pasture; the Romans occupied the place in 15 BC. Later were opened mining to extract gold, silver, copper and lead which remained active until the sixteenth century, and these were owned by the Bishops of Brixen until 1490 when they passed to the Principality of Tirol. In a 1238 document appeared the name “Padreins” while “Obernberg” is mentioned for the first time approximately in 1300, until then it was called “Vinaders”. The nearby villages of the Wippatal, as St. Leonhard, St. Jodok and Gries am Brenner, drew development from the mining activities as on their territories were foundries and warehouses. Around in 1560, with the advent of the imports of precious metals from the new world, the mines and the stock yards closed. A Chapel in Romanesque style, built by miners, dedicated to St. Nikolaus is mentioned in a document dated to 1339. In the fifteenth century, because of the growing population, the chapel was extended and the choir was built in Giothic style. Until 1758 the chapel depended on Matrei am Brenner, than had its own Curate and on the same site, under the direction of Franz de Paula Penz, a new baroque church was built; in 1891 it was elevated to Parish.

== Population ==
Historical population
| Year | Pop. | ±% |
|---|---|---|
| 1869 | 380 | — |
| 1880 | 347 | −8.7% |
| 1890 | 326 | −6.1% |
| 1900 | 334 | +2.5% |
| 1910 | 313 | −6.3% |
| 1923 | 364 | +16.3% |
| 1934 | 368 | +1.1% |
| 1939 | 347 | −5.7% |
| 1951 | 355 | +2.3% |
| 1961 | 326 | −8.2% |
| 1971 | 327 | +0.3% |
| 1981 | 352 | +7.6% |
| 1991 | 362 | +2.8% |
| 2001 | 364 | +0.6% |
| 2011 | 364 | +0.0% |
